= Ernie's Walk =

Trail along the Los Angeles River

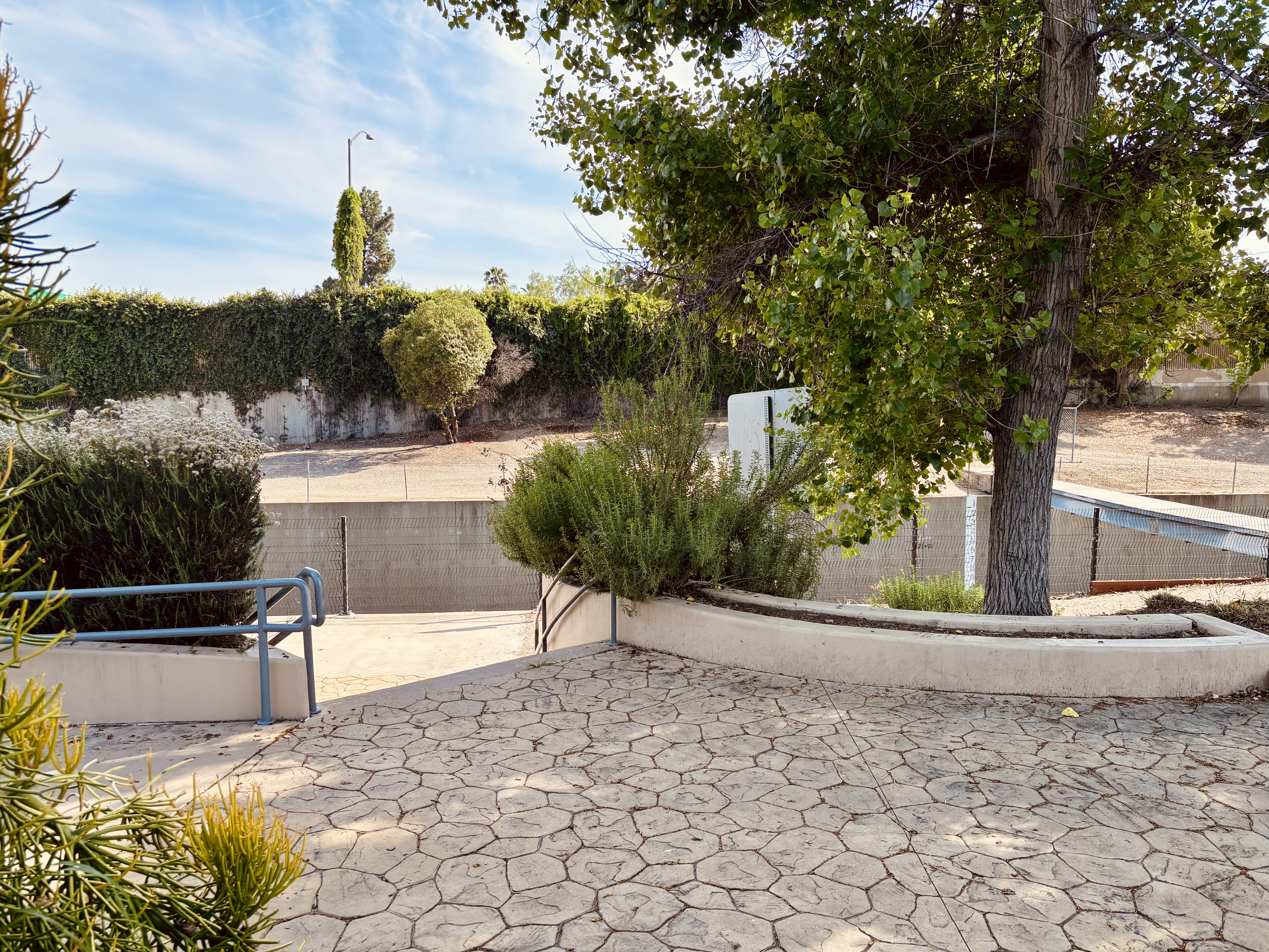
- Interactive map of Ernie's Walk
- Type: Trail
- Location: Valleyheart Drive between Kester Avenue and Cedros Avenue, Sherman Oaks, Los Angeles, California, U.S.
- Coordinates: 34.158441°N 118.455199°W
- Area: 0.3 mi (0.48 km) (linear)
- Elevation: 663 ft (202 m)
- Opened: 1987 (community garden); 2004 (county park)
- Founder: Ernie La Mere (d. 1995)
- Operator: Los Angeles County Department of Public Works
- Hiking trails: 0.6 mi (0.97 km) round trip
- Parking: Street parking

Ernie's Walk is a 0.3-mile (0.48 km) linear trail along the north bank of the Los Angeles River in Sherman Oaks, Los Angeles, California. The trail runs along Valleyheart Drive between Kester Avenue and Cedros Avenue. The trail is named for Ernie La Mere, a retired Sherman Oaks resident who began planting along a degraded stretch of riverbank in 1987. Los Angeles County renovated the site in 2003, and it reopened as a county park in 2004.

== History ==
=== Origins ===
In the late 1980s, the stretch of the Los Angeles River passing through Sherman Oaks near the junction of the Ventura and San Diego freeways had become infiltrated with weeds. It was also used as an illegal dumping ground. Ernie La Mere, a retired local resident, contacted governmental agencies to have the area cleaned up. He began planting extra flowers in the newly cleared riverbank. Some neighbors joined him; the group planted trees and shrubs along the channel. La Mere added some benches and established a section called "Boot Hill," a mock graveyard with humorous epitaphs that eventually came to include pet memorials. A neighbor put up a sign naming the path Ernie's Walk.

La Mere died in 1995. His grandson and some neighbors continued tending the site afterward, though less consistently.

=== County renovation ===
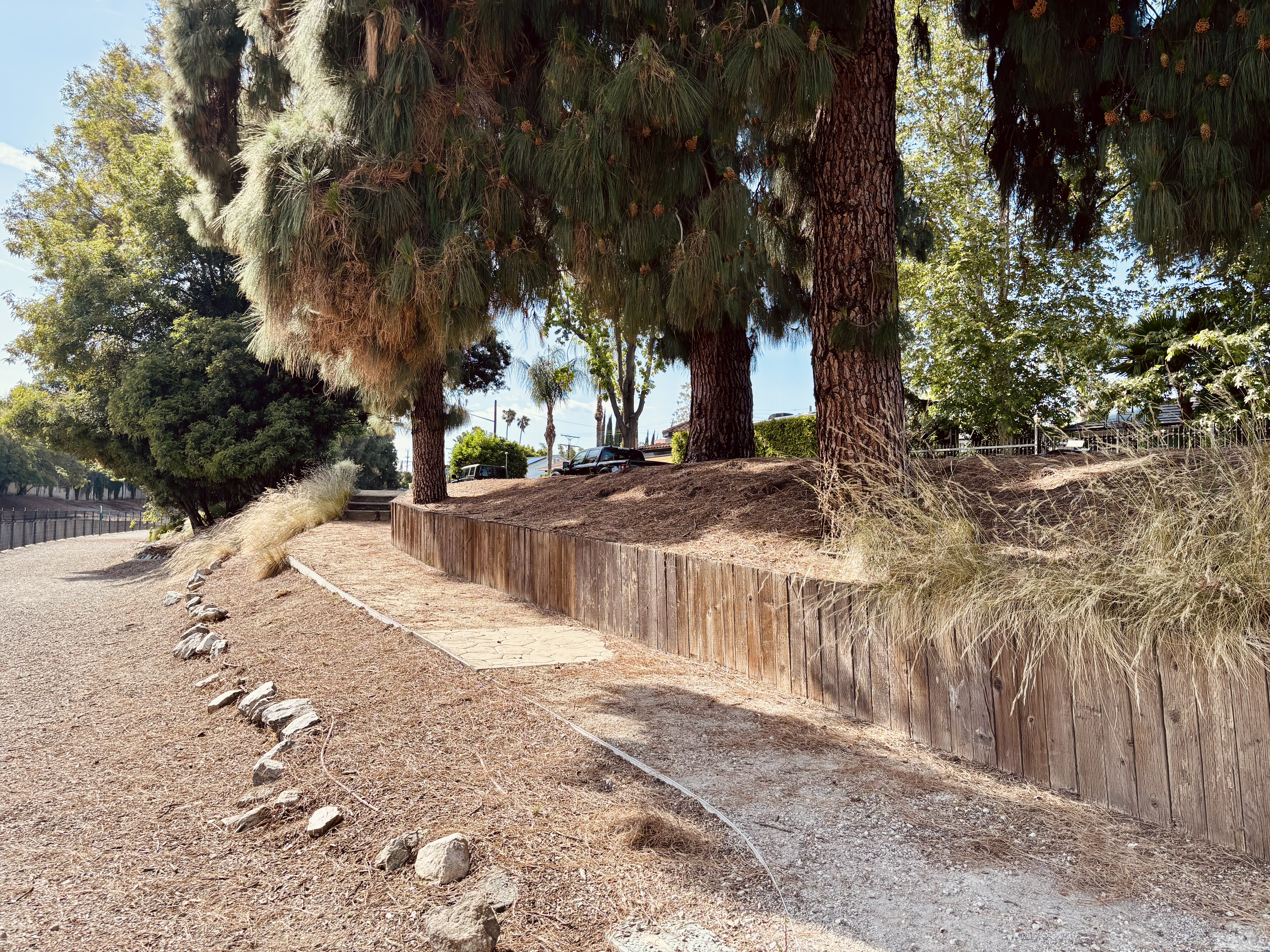
Ernie's Walk Ramp Entrance

In 2003, the Los Angeles County Department of Public Works renovated the site. Native plants including cottonwood trees were added, and many of La Mere's surviving plants were moved from the water's edge to allow maintenance access. River rock retaining walls, stairs, a ramp, and new fencing were installed. The original wooden "Boot Hill" markers were removed and replaced with a concrete marker inscribed Ernie's Walk Pet Commemorative.

== Legacy ==
Ernie's Walk is noted in accounts of the Los Angeles River revitalization movement as an early example of community initiated greening along the concrete channel. The movement grew through the late 1980s and 1990s, including through the work of Friends of the Los Angeles River, founded by poet and activist Lewis MacAdams in 1986. The Los Angeles City Council adopted the Los Angeles River Revitalization Master Plan in 2007.

The site was featured in an episode of the PBS television program Visiting... with Huell Howser. The Los Angeles County Department of Public Works lists it as a stop on its Los Angeles River Watershed Tour.

== See also ==
- Los Angeles River
- Friends of the Los Angeles River
- North Valleyheart Riverwalk
- Sherman Oaks, Los Angeles
- Visiting... with Huell Howser
