= Aliso Creek (Los Angeles County) =

Aliso Canyon Wash Aliso Creek
- Location of the mouth in California

Location
- Country: United States
- State: California
- Region: Los Angeles County
- Cities: Granada Hills, Northridge, Winnetka, Reseda

Physical characteristics
- Source: Aliso Canyon Park
  - location: Near Mission Point, Santa Susana Mountains
  - coordinates: 34°19′23″N 118°32′45″W
  - elevation: 2,600 ft (790 m)
- Mouth: Los Angeles River
  - location: Reseda
  - coordinates: 34°11′24″N 118°32′30″W
  - elevation: 725 ft (221 m)
- Length: 8.5 mi (13.7 km), North-south
- Basin size: 21 sq mi (54 km^{2})
- Discharge
  - average: 3 cu ft/s (0.085 m^{3}/s)

Basin features
- River system: Los Angeles River
- Tributaries
  - right: Wilbur Canyon Wash, Limekiln Wash

Aliso Creek (also Aliso Canyon Wash or Aliso Wash) is a major tributary of the Upper Los Angeles River in the Santa Susana Mountains in Los Angeles County and western San Fernando Valley in the City of Los Angeles, California.

It has a watershed of 21 square miles (54 km^{2}). It is the second major tributary, after Browns Canyon Wash−Creek, to enter the Los Angeles River downstream of its headwaters at the confluence of Bell Creek and Arroyo Calabasas in Canoga Park.

It was formerly the boundary for the City of Los Angeles.

== Course ==
The stream runs about 10 miles (16 km) from Aliso Canyon below Oat Mountain in the Santa Susana Mountains to its confluence with the Los Angeles River.

During its first 1 mile (1.6 km), it is a free-flowing stream mostly contained within Aliso Canyon Park and Eddlestone Park on the border of Granada Hills and Porter Ranch. After it passes under State Route 118 (Simi Valley Freeway) and enters Northridge, it empties into a retention basin and from there on is encased in a concrete flood control channel flowing southward across the San Fernando Valley. Upstream of Plummer Street Wilbur Canyon Wash enters it, and shortly after that downstream Limekiln Wash enters it, both on the east bank.

In Reseda the Aliso Creek channel makes a 90-degree bend to the east, south of Vanowen Avenue and west of West Valley Park, flowing a short distance to its confluence with the Los Angeles River, north of Victory Boulevard between Wilbur Avenue and Reseda Boulevard.

=== Crossings and tributaries ===
From the northern Santa Susana Mountains source to the southern mouth (year built in parentheses):

- Rinaldi Street
- California State Route 118 - Ronald Reagan Freeway (1980)
- Concrete flood channel opening
- San Fernando Mission Road
- Tribune Street
- Chatsworth Street
- San Jose Street [Pedestrian Bridge] (1967)
- Service bridges
- Devonshire Street
- Lemarsh Street
- Reseda Boulevard (1950)
- Lassen Street (1966)
- Yolanda Avenue (1963)
- Limekiln Canyon Wash enters
- Wilbur Avenue (1969)
- Plummer Street (1967)
- Nordhoff Street (1969)
- Wilbur Canyon Wash enters
- Railroad: Union Pacific Railroad Coast Line, Metrolink Ventura County Line
- Parthenia Street (1955)
- Chase Street [Pedestrian Bridge] (1958)
- Roscoe Boulevard (1955)
- Wilbur Avenue (1955)
- Strathern Street (1952)
- Arminta Street [Pedestrian Bridge] (1960)
- Saticoy Street (1954)
- Valerio Street [Pedestrian Bridge] (1976)
- Sherman Way (1954)
- Hart Street [Pedestrian Bridge] (1954)
- Vanowen Street (1954)
- Confluence with the Los Angeles River channel

== See also ==
- Aliso Canyon gas leak
- Aliso Canyon Oil Field
- Rivers of Los Angeles County, California
- Geography of the San Fernando Valley
