= Valleyheart =

Valleyheart may refer to:

- Valleyheart (She Wants Revenge album), 2011
- Valleyheart (Justin Rutledge album), 2013
- North Valleyheart Riverwalk, a linear park in California
