= Burbank Western Channel =

Tributary of the Los Angeles river in Los Angeles, California

Coordinates: 34°10′58″N 118°19′08″W

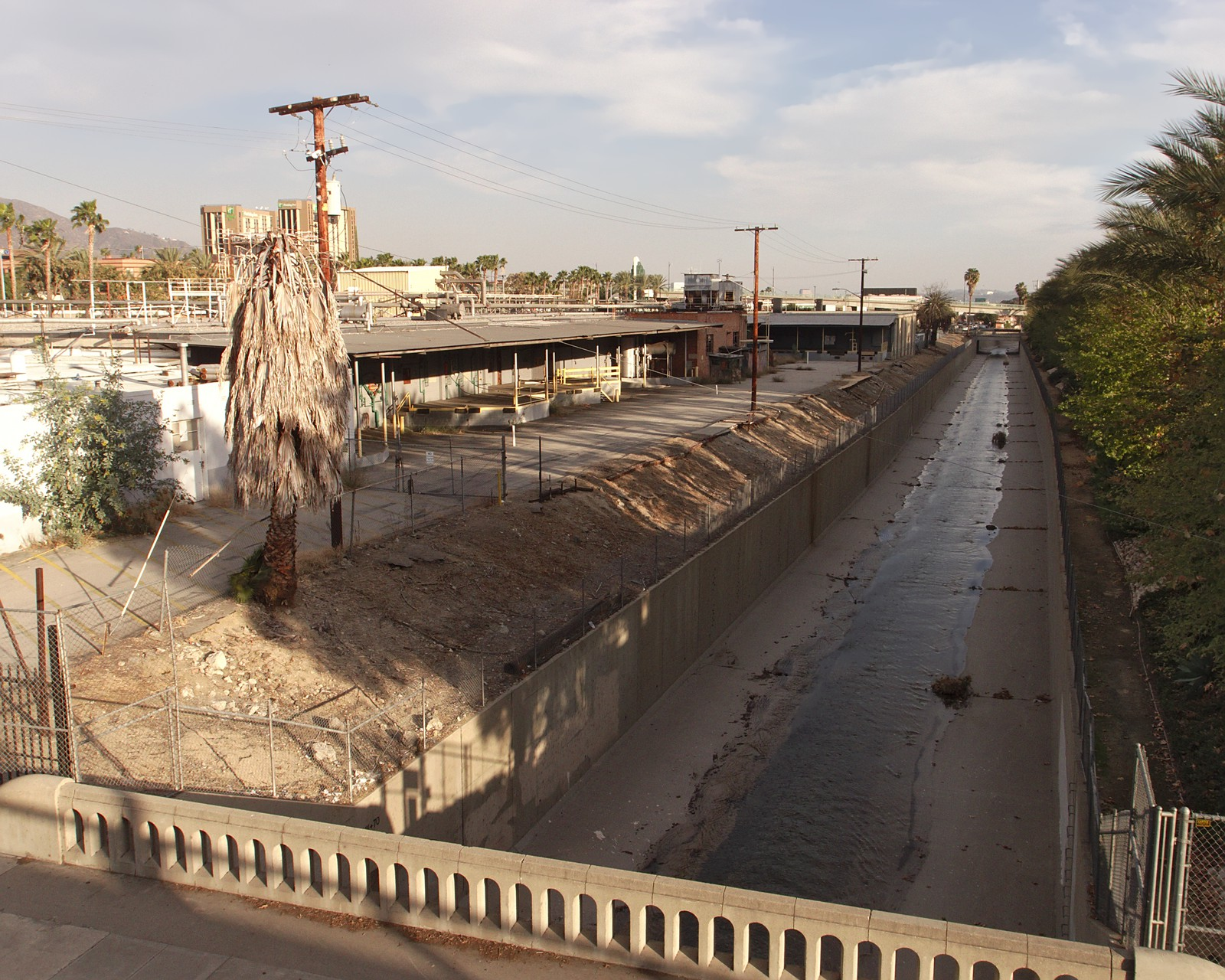
- The Burbank Western Channel at Magnolia Blvd.

Location
- Country: United States

Physical characteristics
- Source
  - location: Sun Valley, California
- Mouth
  - location: Los Angeles River, California
- Length: 6.3 mi (10.1 km)

Burbank Western Channel (also known as Burbank Western Wash) is a 6.3-mile-long (10.1 km) tributary of the Los Angeles River in the eastern San Fernando Valley of Los Angeles County, California.

The stream begins at the confluence of Hansen Heights Channel and La Tuna Canyon Lateral in Sun Valley. It runs adjacent to Interstate 5 for most of its length and is entirely encased in a concrete flood control channel. The stream travels southeast through downtown Burbank, the Riverside Rancho area of Glendale, ultimately joining the Los Angeles River by the edge of the Los Angeles Equestrian Center.

In 1991, the city of Burbank was sued by the EPA for allowing companies to exceed discharge limits into the channel. Leading pollutants in the stream include algae, ammonia, cadmium, odors, unnatural scum/foam, and trash.

Under the American Recovery and Reinvestment Act of 2009, the U.S. Army Corps of Engineers has planned to allocate $700,000 to repair the channel wall which is "currently in danger of failing."

In October 2009, Burbank reached an agreement with the state on the 12 mile San Fernando Bikeway, a new bicycle path along San Fernando Boulevard from Sylmar to Burbank. This would include a portion next to the channel that connects to the Downtown Burbank Metrolink Station.

== Crossings and tributaries ==
From mouth to source (year built in parentheses):

- Los Angeles Equestrian Center [Pedestrian/Equestrian Bridge]
- Riverside Drive (1940)
- Victory Boulevard (1940)
- West Alameda Avenue (1949)
- West Elmwood Avenue [Pedestrian Bridge]
- South Lake Street/West Providencia Avenue (1949)
- West Verdugo Avenue (1949)
- Abandoned Railroad
- West Olive Avenue (1949)
- East Magnolia Boulevard (1949)
- Abandoned Railroad
- Abandoned Railroad
- Submerged from South Front Street to Interstate 5
- Submerged under North San Fernando Boulevard past Landis Street
- North Buena Vista Street/Winona Avenue (1958)
- Ramps from and to Interstate 5 (1960)
- Cohasset Street (1958)
- North Hollywood Way (1962)
- Lanark Street (1962)
- Glenoaks Boulevard (1962)
- Nettleton Street (1961)

=== Hansen Heights Channel ===
- Vinedale Street
- Penrose Street
- La Tuna Canyon Road
- Tuxford Street
- Private road
- Sunland Boulevard
- Pendleton Street
- Clybourn Avenue
- Submerged past Stonehurst Avenue

=== La Tuna Canyon Lateral ===
- Vinedale Street
- Jordan Lane
- Private road
- Village Avenue
- Wildwood Avenue
- Martindale Avenue
- Morning Glow Way
- Private roads x5
- La Tuna Canyon Road
