= Friends of the Los Angeles River =

Non-profit organization in California, US

Friends of the Los Angeles River (FoLAR) is a 501(c)(3) non-profit organization founded in California in 1986, whose mission is to protect and restore the natural and historic heritage of the Los Angeles River and its riparian habitat. The group was initially founded by area performance artist Lewis MacAdams in conjunction with other artists and architects, following a foot tour of the "latter day urban hell" of the river.
