= Juan Naula =

Ecuadorian American activist

Juan Eduardo Naula is an Ecuadorian born American community activist and social media personality based in Los Angeles. He is the founder of Clean LA with Me, a 501(c)(3) nonprofit established in 2024 that organizes volunteer illegal dumping cleanups. He has been honored by the Los Angeles City Council.

== Early life ==
Naula was born in Ecuador. He later lived in Virginia, where he worked in hardwood flooring, before moving to Los Angeles in late 2024. He lost $8,000 to a scam shortly after arriving and nearly returned to Virginia.

== Clean LA with Me ==
Naula began cleaning streets in Los Angeles in November 2024, initially buying supplies himself and posting videos of his work online. He later quit his job to do the work full time. His effort grew into a nonprofit, Clean LA with Me.

The organization's Instagram account grew from nearly 50,000 followers in September 2025 to more than 80,000 by August 2026.

Naula reports illegal dumping through the city's MyLA311 app, and the City of Los Angeles has featured his work.

In April 2026, Naula found a couple living inside hollow bridge pillars along the Los Angeles River in East Los Angeles, and worked with other nonprofits to connect people living in such conditions with assistance.
