= Lewis MacAdams =

American writer (1944–2020)

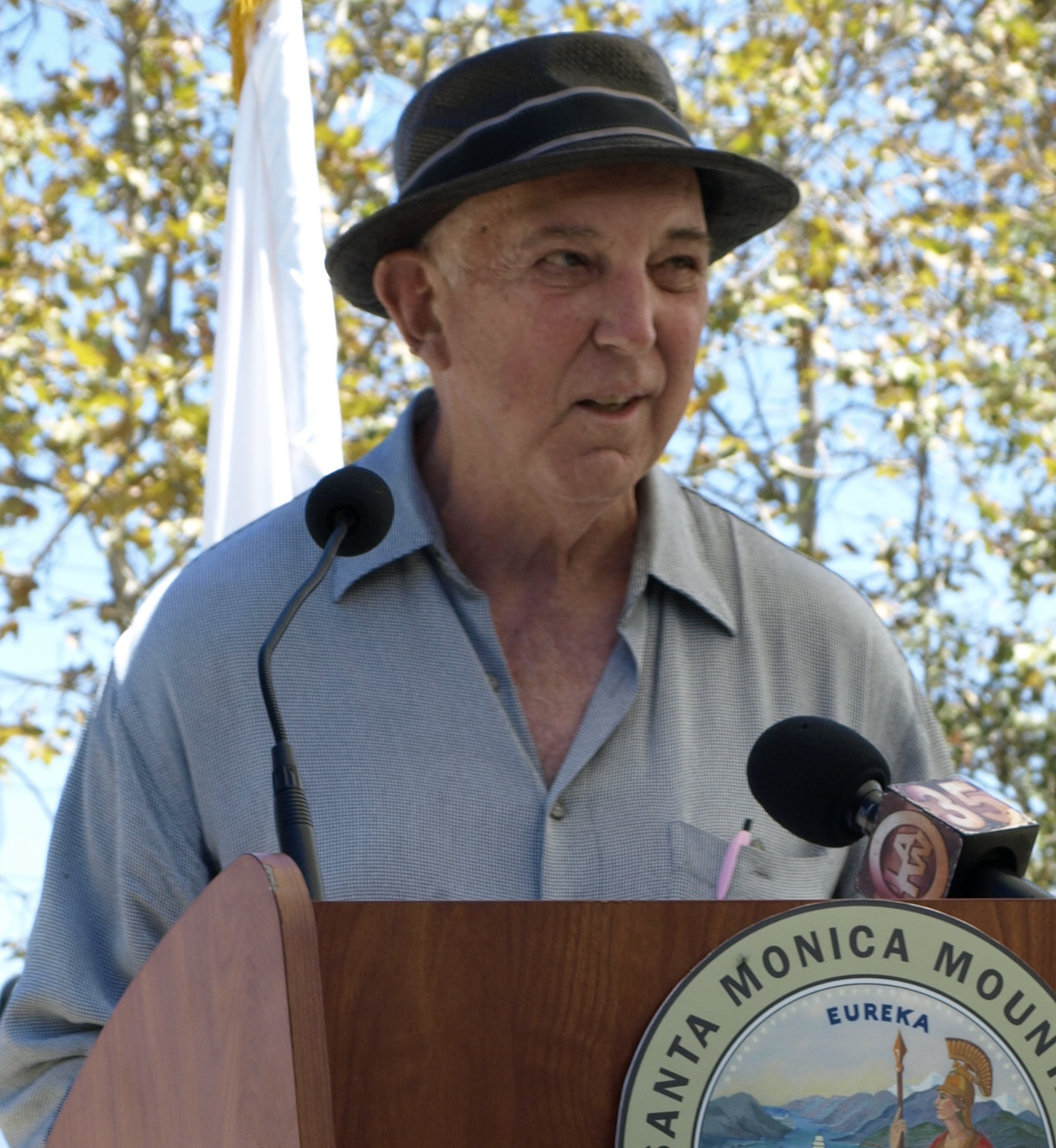
- Born: October 12, 1944; San Angelo, Texas, U.S.
- Died: April 21, 2020 (aged 75); Los Angeles, California, U.S.
- Education: Princeton University (BA); University at Buffalo (MA)
- Known for: Co-founder of FoLAR

Lewis MacAdams (October 12, 1944 – April 21, 2020) was an American poet, journalist, political activist, and filmmaker.

== Early life and education ==
MacAdams was born in San Angelo, Texas and grew up in Dallas, where he graduated from St. Mark's School of Texas in 1962. He then graduated from Princeton University in 1966. He then earned a master's degree from the University at Buffalo.

== Career ==
MacAdams was the author of a dozen books and tapes of poetry, and his poems have appeared in many anthologies. In 2001, he published his Birth of The Cool, a cultural history of the idea of cool. As a journalist, MacAdams was a contributing editor of L.A. Weekly and wrote regularly on culture and ecology for Rolling Stone, Men's Journal, the Los Angeles Times, and Los Angeles magazine. MacAdams was the director of the Poetry Center at San Francisco State University from 1975 to 1978.

As a political activist, MacAdams was a cofounder of Friends of the Los Angeles River (FoLAR) established in 1985 (and served as chair on their board of directors). FoLAR was characterized by MacAdams as a "40 year art work" to bring the Los Angeles River back to life. In the years which followed, he became the river's most important and influential advocate. Among FoLAR's many projects are an annual river clean-up, the "Gran Limpieza", which brings 2500 people down to the river every spring to clean up; and an ongoing series of conferences and planning workshops dealing with every aspect of the river. Two of its current major goals are to create a Los Angeles River Conservancy to oversee restoration of the river, and a River Watch program to improve the River's water quality and target polluters

In 1991, MacAdams received the San Fernando Valley Audubon Society's annual Conservation Award. MacAdams' work, The River: Books One, Two & Three, takes the Los Angeles River as its metaphor, weaving the story and song of the poet, activist and journalist as these three roles form the confluence which is the man.

== Death ==
On April 21, 2020, MacAdams died at the age of 75 from complications of Parkinson's disease. He is survived by his three sons and his daughter.

== Selected publications ==
=== Books ===
- City Money: Poems. Burning Water (1966)
- City Room
- The Poetry Room. New York: Harper & Row; First Edition (January 1, 1970)
- A Bolinas Report
- Tilth
- Dance, pamphlet. Canton: The Institute of Further Studies; first edition (January 1, 1972)
- News From Niman Farm, Tombouctou Books, 1976; first edition (November 1976)
- Live At The Church. Kulchur Foundation (1977)
- Blind Date, pamphlet. Am Here Books/Immediate Editions; first edition (January 1, 1981)
- The Angel (with Rita Degli Esposti & Gianantonio Pozzi)
- Africa and The Marriage of Walt Whitman and Marilyn Monroe. Little Caesar Press (1982)
- The River, Books One & Two. Palo Alto, CA: Blue Press, 1998
- Birth of the Cool: Beat, Bebop, and the American Avant-Garde. New York: The Free Press, 2001
- The Family Trees, (illustrated by Kim Abeles). Palo Alto, CA: Blue Press, 2001
- A Poem for the Dawn of the Terror Years. Palo Alto, CA: Blue Press, 2003
- The River: Books One, Two, and Three. Palo Alto, CA: Blue Press, revised second edition, 2007
- Lyrics. Palo Alto, CA: Blue Press, 2009
- Dear Oxygen. New Orleans, LA: University of New Orleans Press, 2011

=== Audiotapes and CD's ===
- To The Russian Women
- And Now The News
- Dear Oxygen Audio CD Collaboration with The Dark Bob (2007)
- "Good Grief" Audio CD Collaboration with The Dark Bob (2015)

=== Articles ===
- "Poetry and Politics." Talking poetics from Naropa Institute : annals of the Jack Kerouac School of Disembodied Poetics V. 2. Ed. Anne Waldman and Marilyn Webb, Boulder, Colo. : Shambhala, 1979
- Remembering Jim Carroll. Los Angeles Times. 16 September 2009.
- Lewis MacAdams and Linda Wagner-Martin (Fall 1968). "Robert Creeley, The Art of Poetry No. 10". The Paris Review. Fall 1968 (44).

== Films ==
- Directed (with Richard Lerner), What Happened to Kerouac? (1986)
- Directed (with Jo Bonney), Funhouse (1986) Funhouse (1986) - IMDb

== See also ==
- List of poets from the United States
