= Los Angeles River =

River in Los Angeles County, California, US

Los Angeles River Spanish: Río de Los Ángeles
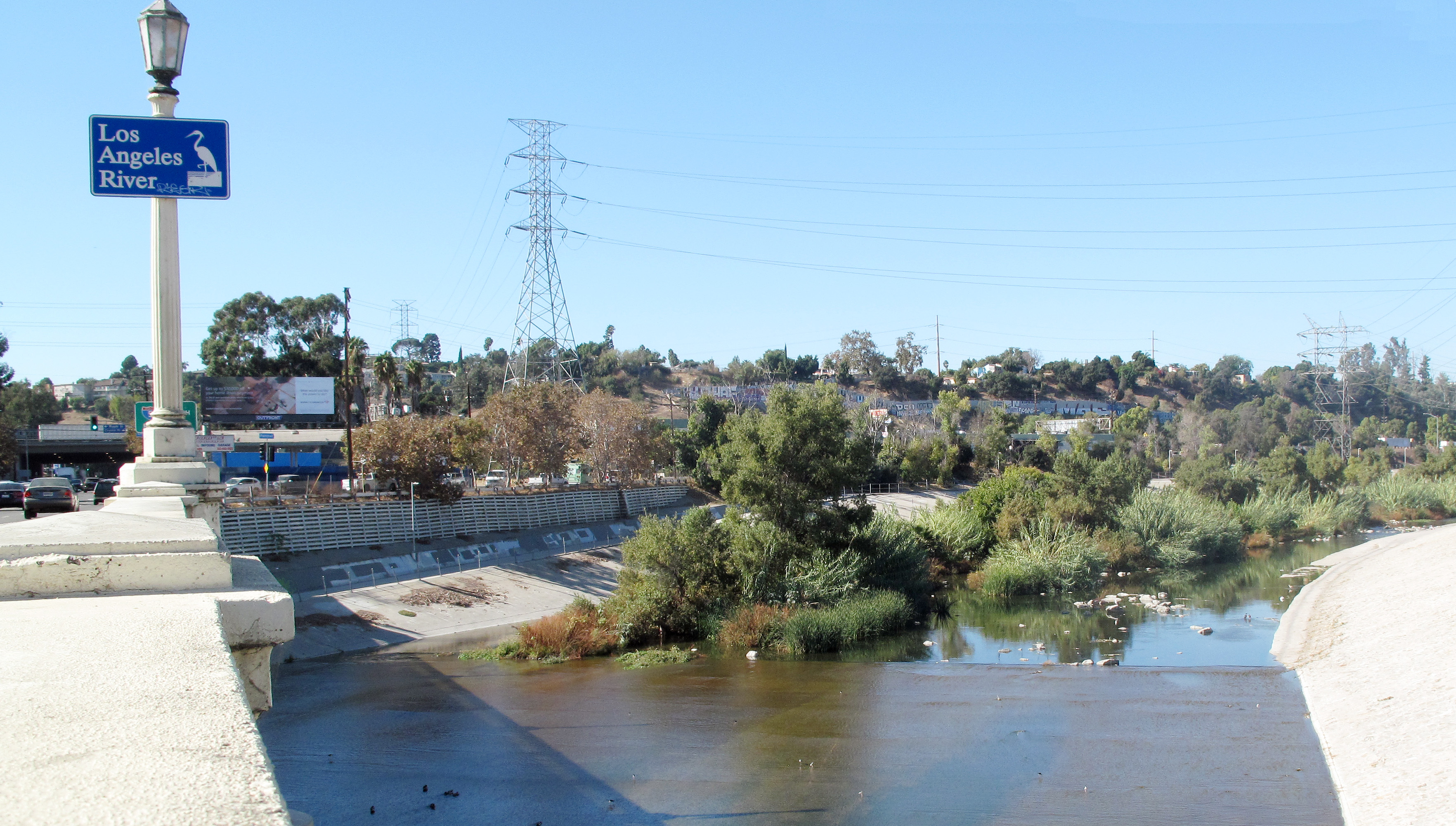
- L.A. River from Fletcher Drive Bridge

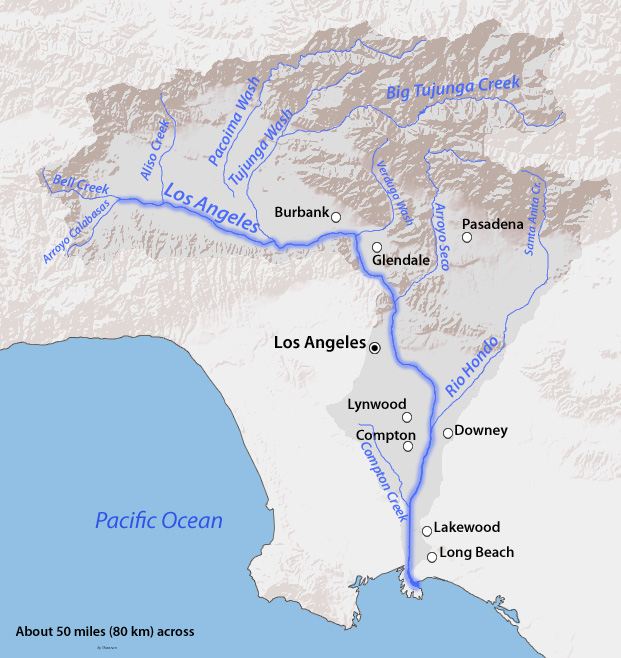
- Map of the Los Angeles River watershed
- Native name: Paayme Paxaayt (Tongva)

Location
- Country: United States
- State: California
- Cities: Burbank, Glendale, Los Angeles, Downey, Compton, Long Beach

Physical characteristics
- Source: Confluence of Bell Creek and Arroyo Calabasas
  - location: Canoga Park, San Fernando Valley
  - coordinates: 34°11′43″N 118°36′08″W
  - elevation: 794 ft (242 m)
- Mouth: Pacific Ocean
  - location: Los Angeles Harbor, Long Beach
  - coordinates: 33°45′23″N 118°11′20″W
  - elevation: 0 ft (0 m)
- Length: 47.9 mi (77.1 km)
- Basin size: 827 sq mi (2,140 km^{2})
- Discharge
  - location: Long Beach
  - average: 226 cu ft/s (6.4 m^{3}/s)
  - minimum: 2 cu ft/s (0.057 m^{3}/s)
  - maximum: 129,000 cu ft/s (3,700 m^{3}/s)

Basin features
- Tributaries
  - left: Bell Creek, Browns Canyon Wash, Aliso Creek, Tujunga Wash, Verdugo Wash, Arroyo Seco, Rio Hondo
  - right: Arroyo Calabasas, Compton Creek

The Los Angeles River (Spanish: Río de Los Ángeles, El Río de Nuestra Señora la Reina de los Ángeles de Porciúncula), historically known as Paayme Paxaayt 'West River' by the Tongva and the Río Porciúncula 'Porciúncula River' by the Spanish, is a major river in Los Angeles County, California. Its headwaters are in the Simi Hills and Santa Susana Mountains, and it flows nearly 51 miles (82 km) from Canoga Park through the San Fernando Valley, downtown Los Angeles, and the Gateway Cities to its mouth in Long Beach, where it flows into San Pedro Bay. While the river was once free-flowing and frequently flooding, forming alluvial flood plains along its banks, it currently flows through a concrete channel on a fixed course, which was built after a series of devastating floods in the early 20th century.

Before the opening of the Los Angeles Aqueduct, the river was the primary source of fresh water for the city. Although the Los Angeles region still receives some water from the river and other local sources, most of the water supply flows from several aqueducts serving the area. The Los Angeles River is heavily polluted from agricultural and urban runoff.

Fed primarily by rainwater and snowmelt (in winter and spring), the Donald C. Tillman Water Reclamation Plant in Van Nuys (in summer and fall), and urban discharge, it is one of the few low-elevation perennial rivers in Southern California. Some water usually reaches the ocean, even in the driest summers; although there are historical accounts of the river running dry, there has been constant flow of the river every month since recording of stream flow began in 1929. This is helped by the concrete channel, which limits absorption of water into the earth. Flow, while generally low in volume, can be extremely brisk even in summer.

== Course ==
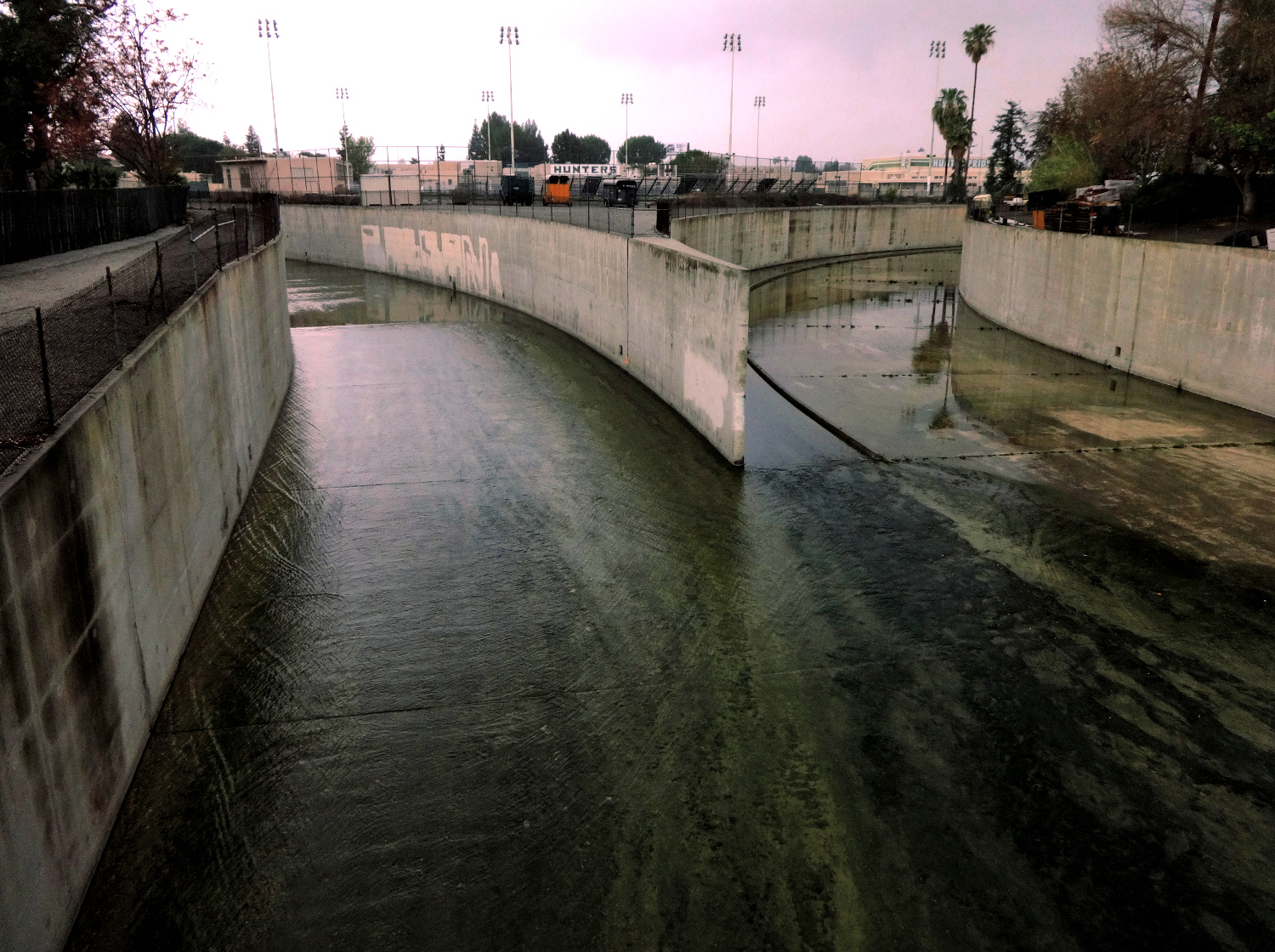
The Arroyo Calabasas (left) and Bell Creek (right) join to form the Los Angeles River

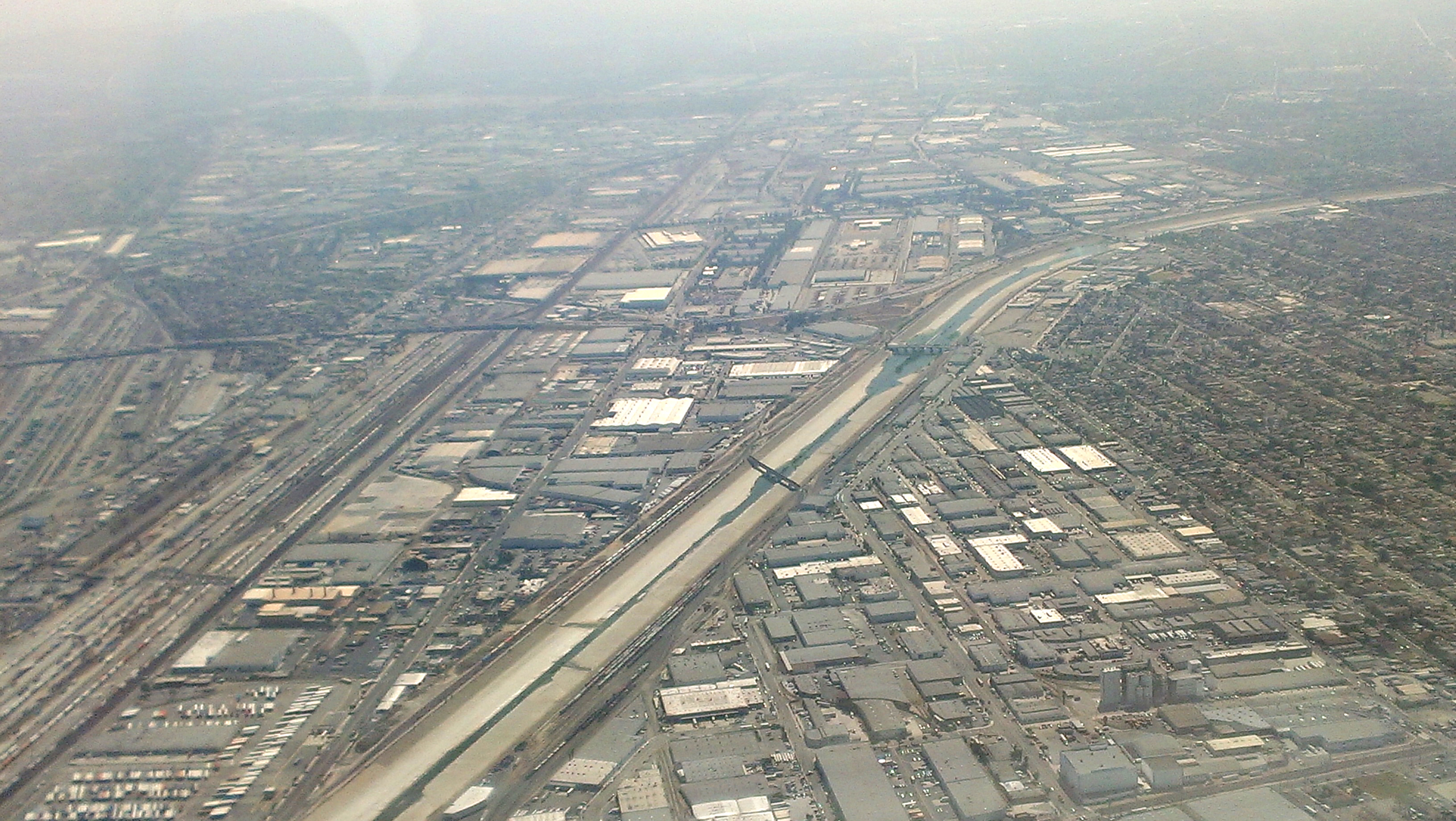
LA River near downtown LA during drought in 2014

The Los Angeles River's official beginning is at the confluence of two channelized streams – Bell Creek and Arroyo Calabasas – in the Canoga Park section of the city of Los Angeles, just east of California State Route 27 (Topanga Canyon Boulevard), at 34.1952°N 118.601838°W (the east side of Canoga Park High School). Bell Creek flows east from the Simi Hills, and Arroyo Calabasas flows north from the Santa Monica Mountains. From there the river flows east through a concrete flood control channel and very soon receives Browns Canyon Wash, which flows south from the Santa Susana Mountains. The river then bends slightly south and receives Aliso Canyon Wash, whose watershed adjoins that of Browns Canyon. The river then flows through the district of Winnetka, then Reseda and enters the Sepulveda Basin, a flood-control reservoir formed by the Sepulveda Dam.

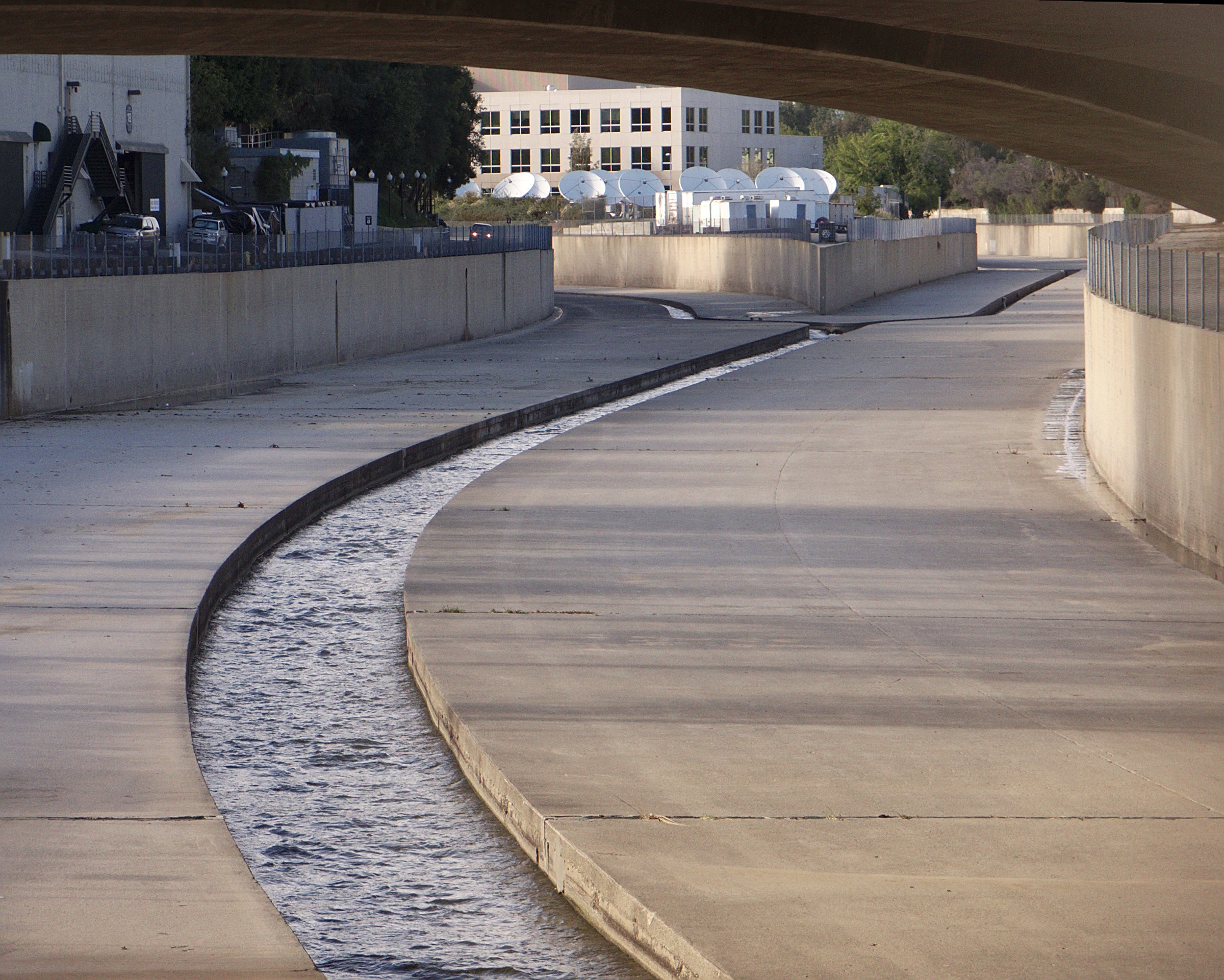
Receiving the Tujunga Wash (right) in Studio City.

As the river proceeds into the usually-dry reservoir, it spills out into a channel that is similar to its historical, non-channeled form. It crosses under Balboa Boulevard and then receives Bull Creek. The river then passes through the outlet works of Sepulveda Dam, 43 miles (69 km) from the mouth. It flows again into a concrete channel and crosses under the San Diego (405) Freeway as it passes through Van Nuys, Sherman Oaks, and Studio City, still flowing east. Paralleling U.S. Highway 101 briefly, it then veers southeast, away from the highway, and receives from the left the Tujunga Wash, one of its largest tributaries, which flows southwest and south from the Angeles National Forest in the San Gabriel Mountains. The river then rounds a bend to the northeast, now in a concrete box culvert, and crosses under the Hollywood (170) Freeway and Highway 101, and receives Burbank Western Channel on the left bank, 39 miles (63 km) from the mouth.

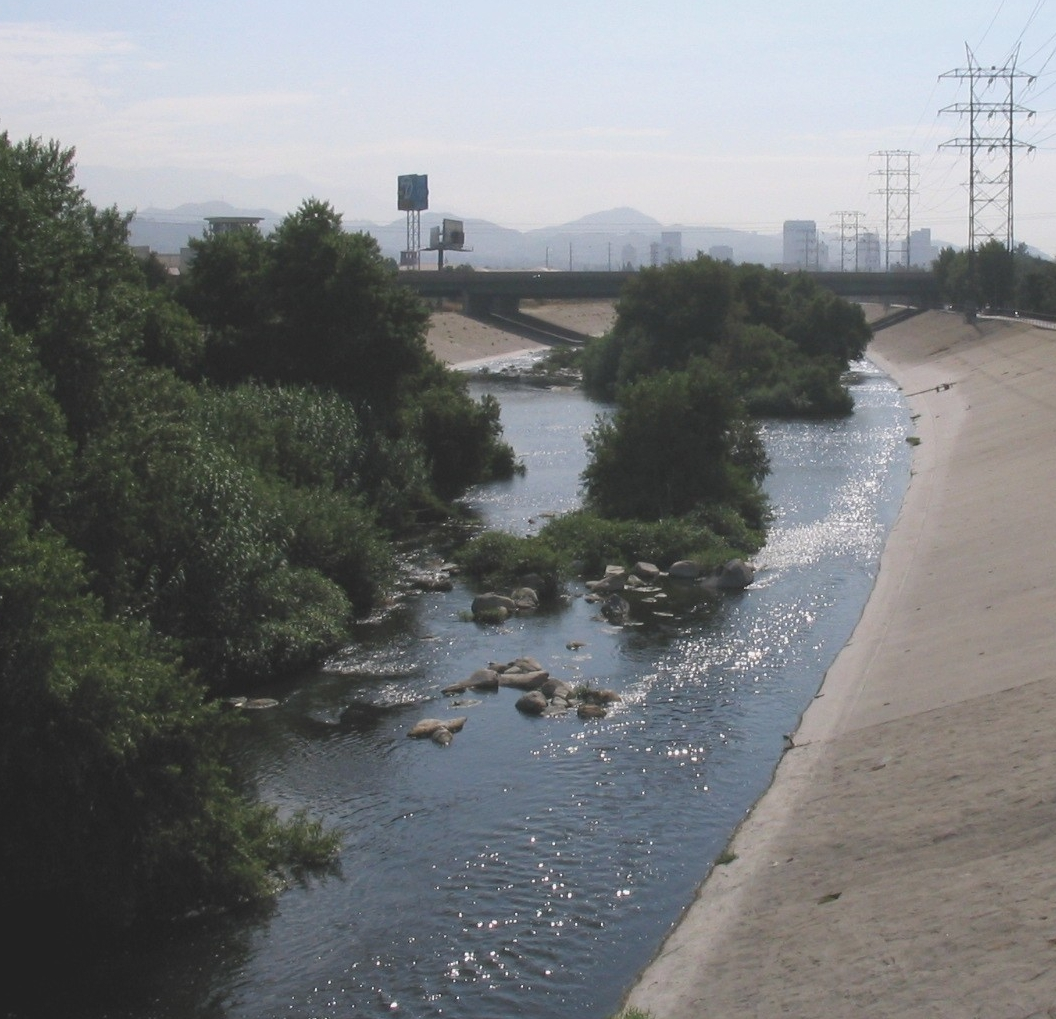
Looking east (downstream) at the Glendale Narrows. Unlike most of the river, this stretch has an earthen bottom.

The river then begins to parallel the Ventura (134) Freeway as it winds through North Hollywood and the city of Burbank. It then crosses under the Golden State (5) Freeway and makes a sharp bend to the south-southeast as it curves around Griffith Park. It receives from the left Verdugo Wash, which drains much of La Cañada Flintridge and Glendale as it flows from the San Gabriel Mountains south through a water gap in the Verdugo Mountains, and crosses under the Ventura Freeway. Here, the river begins to flow over a natural riverbed, but enters another concrete section soon after. Paralleling the Golden State Freeway for the next few miles, the river runs by the eastern side of Griffith Park and the Harding-Wilson Golf Course. It passes Silver Lake Reservoir, which is to the right, and crosses under the Glendale (2) Freeway, 32 miles (51 km) from the mouth.

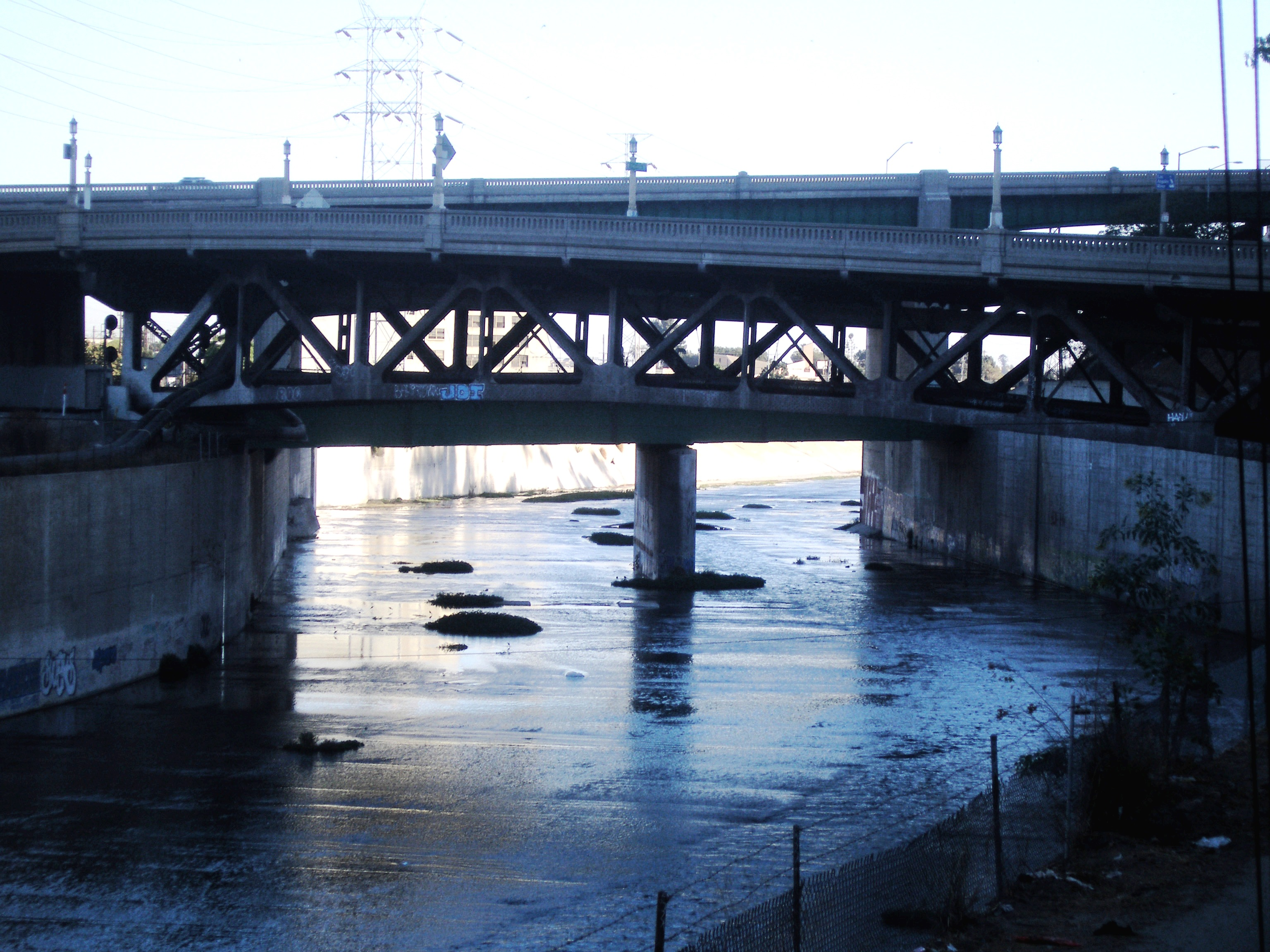
Figueroa (Dayton Avenue) Bridge, showing the channelized river

Making two meanders as it flows in a southeasterly direction, the river parallels the interstate and Riverside Drive then crosses under the interstate and Arroyo Seco (110) Parkway as it flows east of Elysian Park. It then receives the Arroyo Seco, another major tributary, from the left. The river flows south past the Mission Junction, a large railroad yard on the left. It enters a wider concrete channel with sloped sides, and crosses under Cesar Chavez Avenue, the Hollywood (101) Freeway, and the San Bernardino (10) Freeway as it passes east of downtown Los Angeles, flowing past the East Los Angeles Interchange of the Santa Ana (101) Freeway, Pomona (60) Freeway, and Interstates 5 and 10 on the left. It then makes a gradual turn east and then turns southeast, flowing a few miles before it begins to parallel the Long Beach (710) Freeway near Maywood, Bell, Cudahy, and Commerce, 20 miles (32 km) from the mouth.

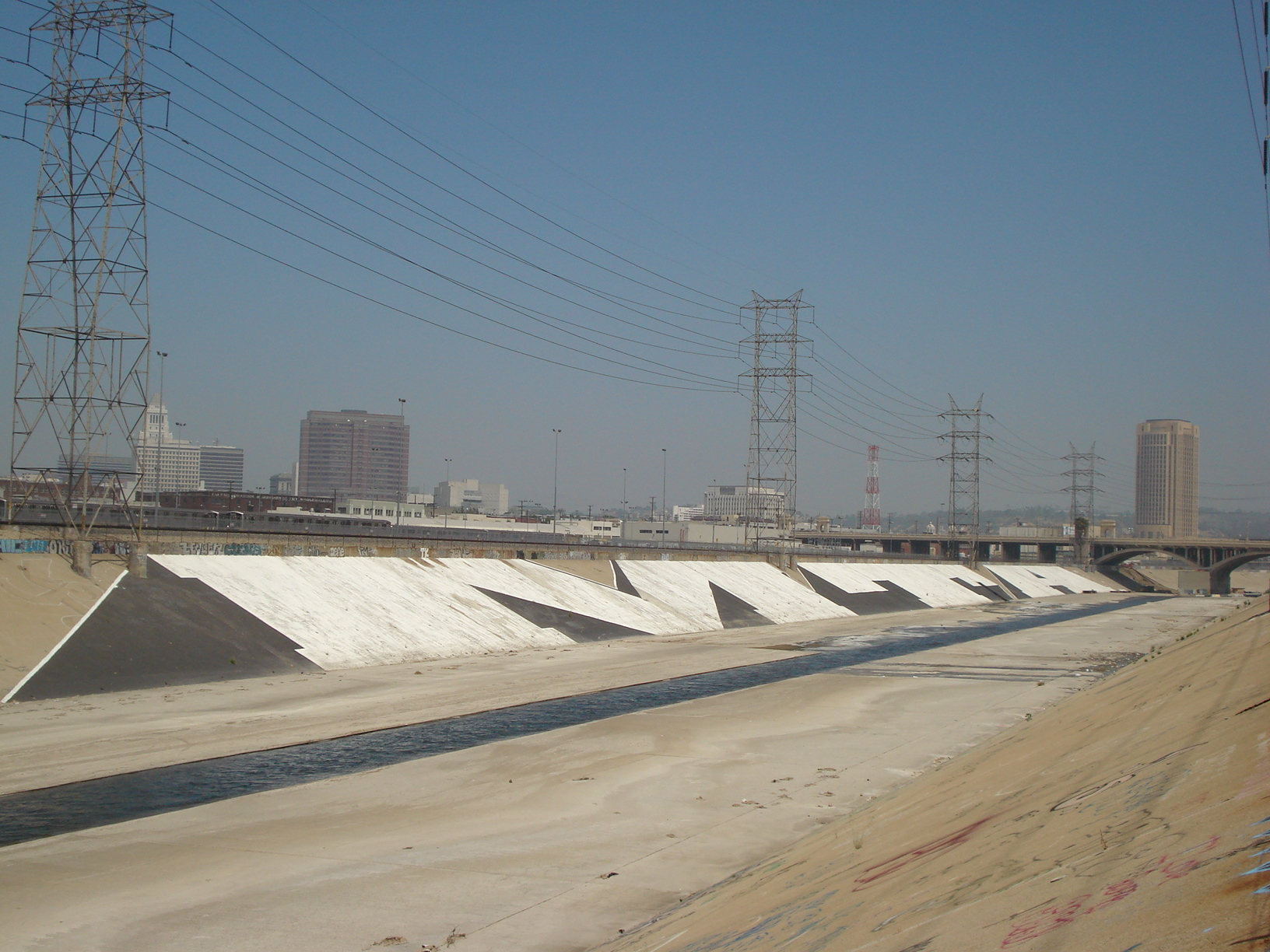
The Los Angeles River's wider channel near the mouth with the famous MTA tag that appeared in 2008 and was buffed in September 2009

Paralleling the Long Beach Freeway south-southwest, the river then crosses under former California State Route 42 and the interstate as it receives the Rio Hondo from the left, 9 miles (14 km) from the mouth. The Rio Hondo ("deep river") now serves as a distributary for the San Gabriel River to the east via the Whittier Narrows Reservoir. The river then crosses under the Century (105) Freeway and shifts slightly southwest, then flows east of Compton and west of Bellflower. After crossing under the Artesia (91) Freeway, it receives Compton Creek from the right, 2.7 miles (4.3 km) from the mouth. After crossing under Interstate 405 for the second time, 2 miles (3.2 km) from the mouth, it draws close to the Dominguez Channel to the west and flows due south to its outlet in Long Beach, under Interstate 710, past the RMS Queen Mary, and into the Port of Long Beach.

== History ==
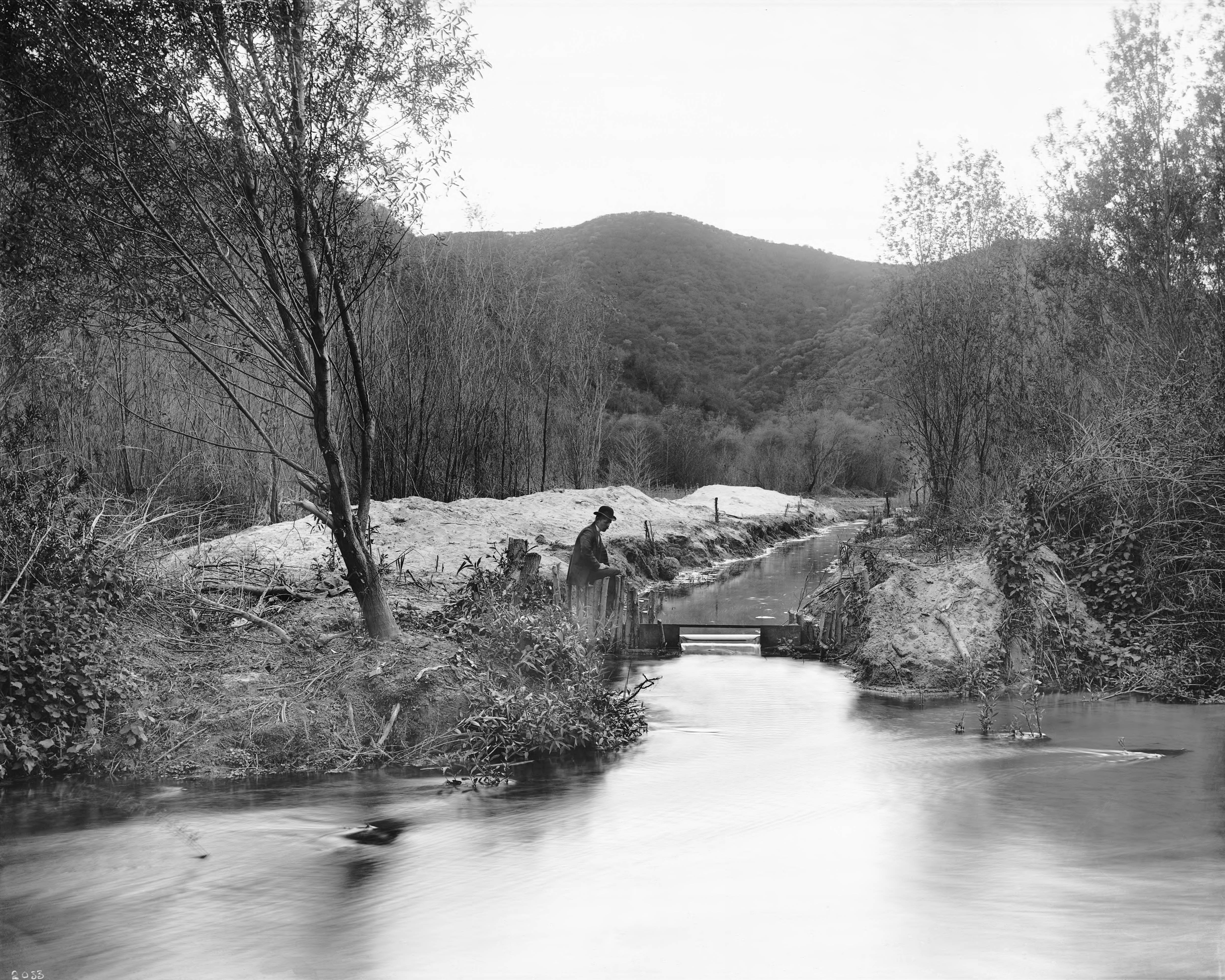
Los Angeles River at Griffith Park, c. 1898–1910

Until the opening of the Los Angeles Aqueduct in 1913, the Los Angeles River was the main water source for the Los Angeles Basin. The river ran dry during the summers and flooded during winter months. Indigenous communities adapted to the climate surrounding the river, maximizing agricultural yields by rerouting the natural flow of the river and constructing water wheels along the river.

The river provided water and food to the Tongva people, hunters and gatherers who lived primarily off fish, small mammals, and the acorns from the abundant oak trees along the river's path. There were at least 45 Tongva villages near the Los Angeles River, concentrated in the San Fernando Valley and the Elysian Valley, in what is present-day Glendale. After the Spanish established Mission San Gabriel in 1771, they referred to the Tongva living in that mission's vicinity as Gabrieleño.

=== Alta California ===
In 1769, members of the Portolá expedition to explore Alta California were the first Europeans to see the river. On August 15, the party camped near the river, somewhere along the stretch just to the north of what is now the Interstate 10 crossing near downtown Los Angeles. Fray Juan Crespi, one of two Franciscan missionaries traveling with Portolá, named it el río de Nuestra Señora La Reina de Los Ángeles de Porciúncula. Crespi chose that name, because August 15 is the date of the yearly Catholic feast day in honor of the Virgin Mary's Assumption into Heaven and assuming the role as Queen of the Angels, to which the small Portiuncula chapel, where the Franciscan Order began in Assisi, Italy, is dedicated. The river was thereafter referred to as the "Porciuncula River". In later years, the "Los Angeles" part of Crespi's lengthy name won out.

=== Possession by the United States ===
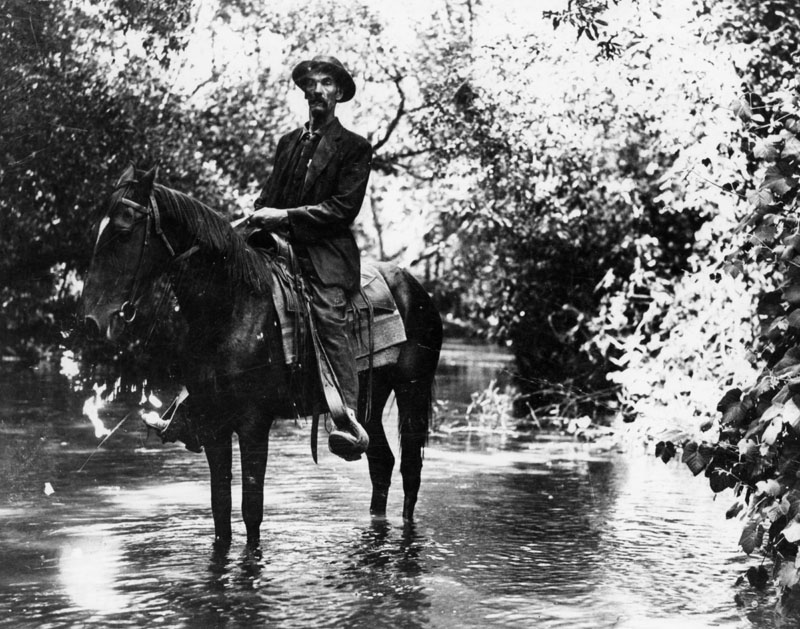
Ed Hunt, Griffith Park policeman, in the Los Angeles River, 1911

Control of California, along with the rest of the northern part of the republic of Mexico, was wrested by the United States in the Mexican-American War (1846–1848). California became a state in 1850, and the Los Angeles area began to boom the following year. Generations of settlers and city managers drained, rerouted, polluted and overpopulated the river and its watershed.

The river was originally an alluvial river that ran freely across a flood plain that is now occupied by Los Angeles, Long Beach, and other townships in Southern California. Its path was unstable and unpredictable, and the mouth of the river moved frequently from one place to another between Long Beach and Ballona Creek. Floods damaged extensive amounts of farmland, destroying houses and killing people and livestock. Severe flooding encouraged those living near the river to adapt and construct further away from the river in order to prevent loss from flooding. In the early 19th century, the river turned southwest after leaving the Glendale Narrows, where it joined Ballona Creek and discharged into Santa Monica Bay in present Marina del Rey. However, this account is challenged by Col. J. J. Warner, in his Historical Sketch of Los Angeles County:

"...until 1825 it was seldom, if in any year, that the river discharged even during the rainy season its waters into the sea. Instead of having a river way to the sea, the waters spread over the country, filling the depressions in the surface and forming lakes, ponds and marshes. The river water, if any, that reached the ocean drained off from the land at so many places, and in such small volumes, that no channel existed until the flood of 1825, which, by cutting a river way to tide water, drained the marsh land and caused the forests to disappear."

The river was long joined by the San Gabriel River in present-day Long Beach, but in the Great Flood of 1862, the San Gabriel carved out a new course 6 miles (9.7 km) to the east, and has discharged into Alamitos Bay ever since. The arrival of the railroad accelerated the advancement in urbanization, as various government bodies subdued the river by reducing its flow. Until the 1900s the river was known to supply enough water to incorporate a system of wells to be built in order to supply freshwater to the city.

=== 20th century ===
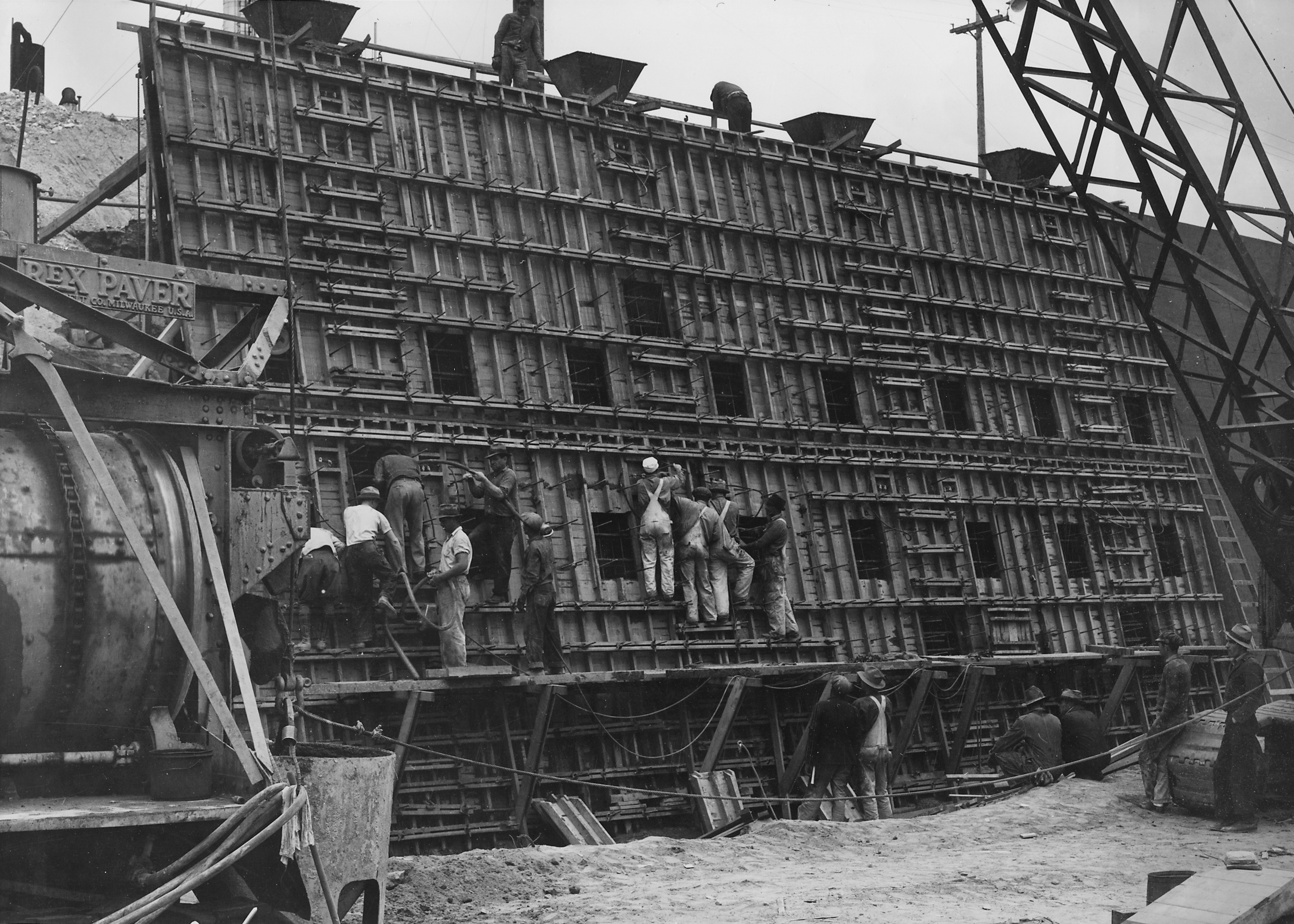
Placing of concrete in a section of the counterforted channel wall on the left bank just above 26th Street in the city of Los Angeles, 1938.

The Los Angeles Aqueduct was opened in 1913. The heavy flow of the Los Angeles River presented many issues, as it began to get exploited as a sewer system. Along with these uses, populations surrounding the river often tossed feces and waste into the river, along with dead dogs and horses (and the occasional dead human), in hopes that they would get washed down stream and released to the open ocean waters.

=== Water wars ===
In the early 1920s, the Los Angeles Department of Water and Power (led by the Los Angeles Board of Water and Power Commissioners) negotiated and gradually purchased almost all of Owens Valley farms and their corresponding water rights. The farmers with the most water banded together to form the Owens Valley Irrigation District in order to try to secure a better deal. When the Owens Valley Irrigation District did not succeed, they created three smaller groups in order to try to bargain. These groups were turbulent in their efforts; resorting to violence, trying to get the attention of state and national press, and calling for politician interference to support their demands for more compensation. This conflict was so highly disputed that the national press referred to it as "California's Little Civil War".

The St. Francis Dam was built starting in 1924 (and through 1926), leading to the creation of a large reservoir in San Francisquito Canyon, and provided water for Los Angeles. The dam collapsed in 1928.

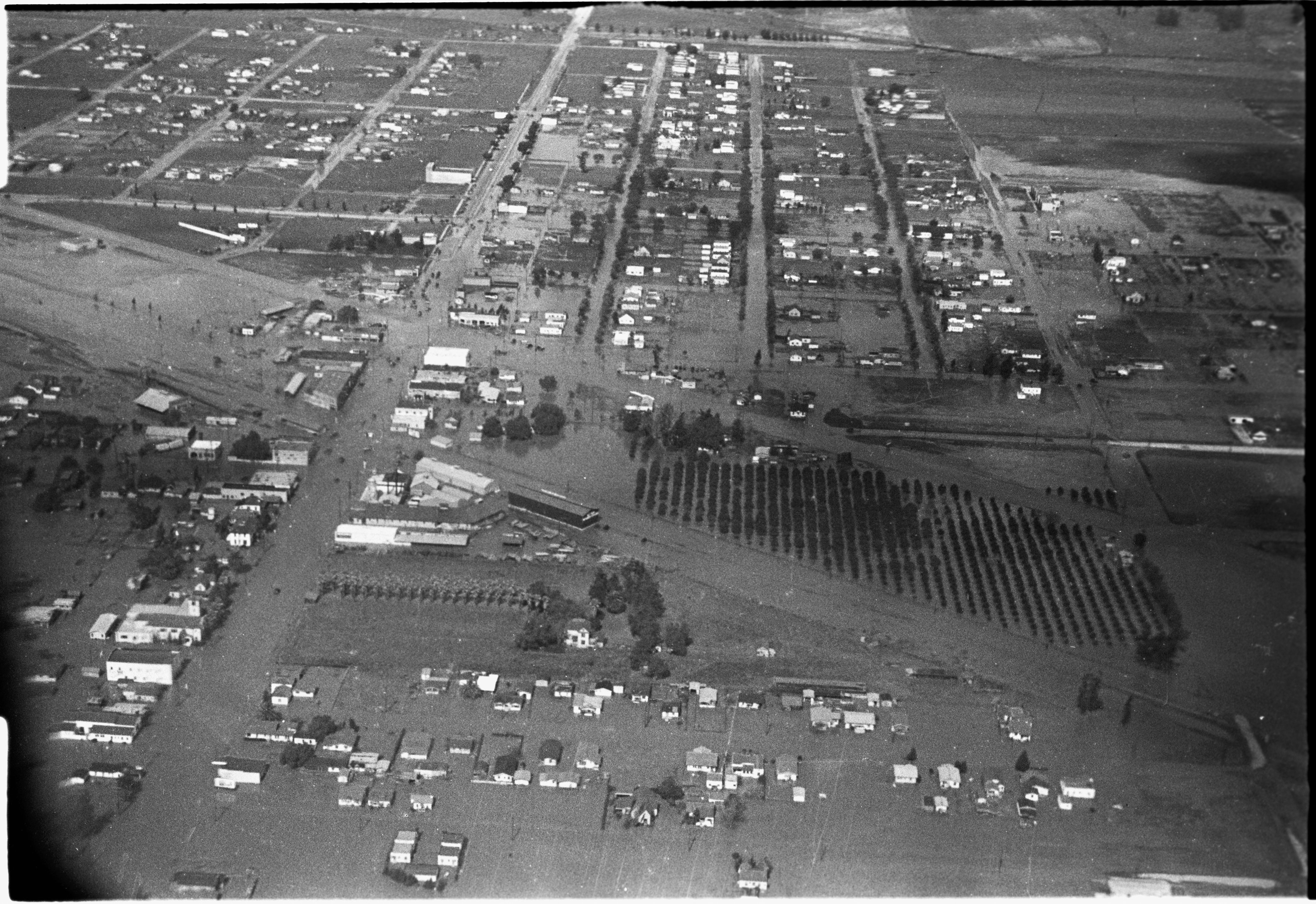
Los Angeles flood in North Hollywood in 1938

The 1930s in particular saw rapid urban development in areas prone to river flooding. Despite smaller mitigation efforts than the St. Francis Dam, unpredictable and devastating floods continued to plague it well into the 1930s, including:

- Crescenta Valley flood (1933 and 1934) - a flood on New Year's Eve and New Year's Day devastated the communities of La Crescenta, Montrose, La Cañada, and Tujunga.
- Los Angeles Flood of 1938 - This flood precipitated the recall of then-mayor of Los Angeles Frank L. Shaw, leading to calls for flood control measures.

The incidents resulted in the US Army Corps of Engineers beginning an ambitious project of encasing the river's bed and banks in concrete. The only portions of the river that are not paved over are in the flood-control basin behind the Sepulveda Dam near Van Nuys; an 11-mile (17.7-km) stretch east of Griffith Park known as the Glendale Narrows; and along its last few miles in Long Beach.

=== After World War II ===
The river was dry for nine months of the year as late as the 1950s. According to an August 2013 article in the Los Angeles Times, the water in the river today is largely "industrial and residential discharge", which originates from the "two giant pipes that collect the sewage from the homes of 800,000 San Fernando Valley residents" that lead to the Tillman Water Reclamation Plant, "before crashing over a man-made waterfall into Lake Balboa. That body of water, along with two smaller ones, puts 23 million gallons of water a day into the river at Sepulveda Basin." The river is considered "effluent dominated".

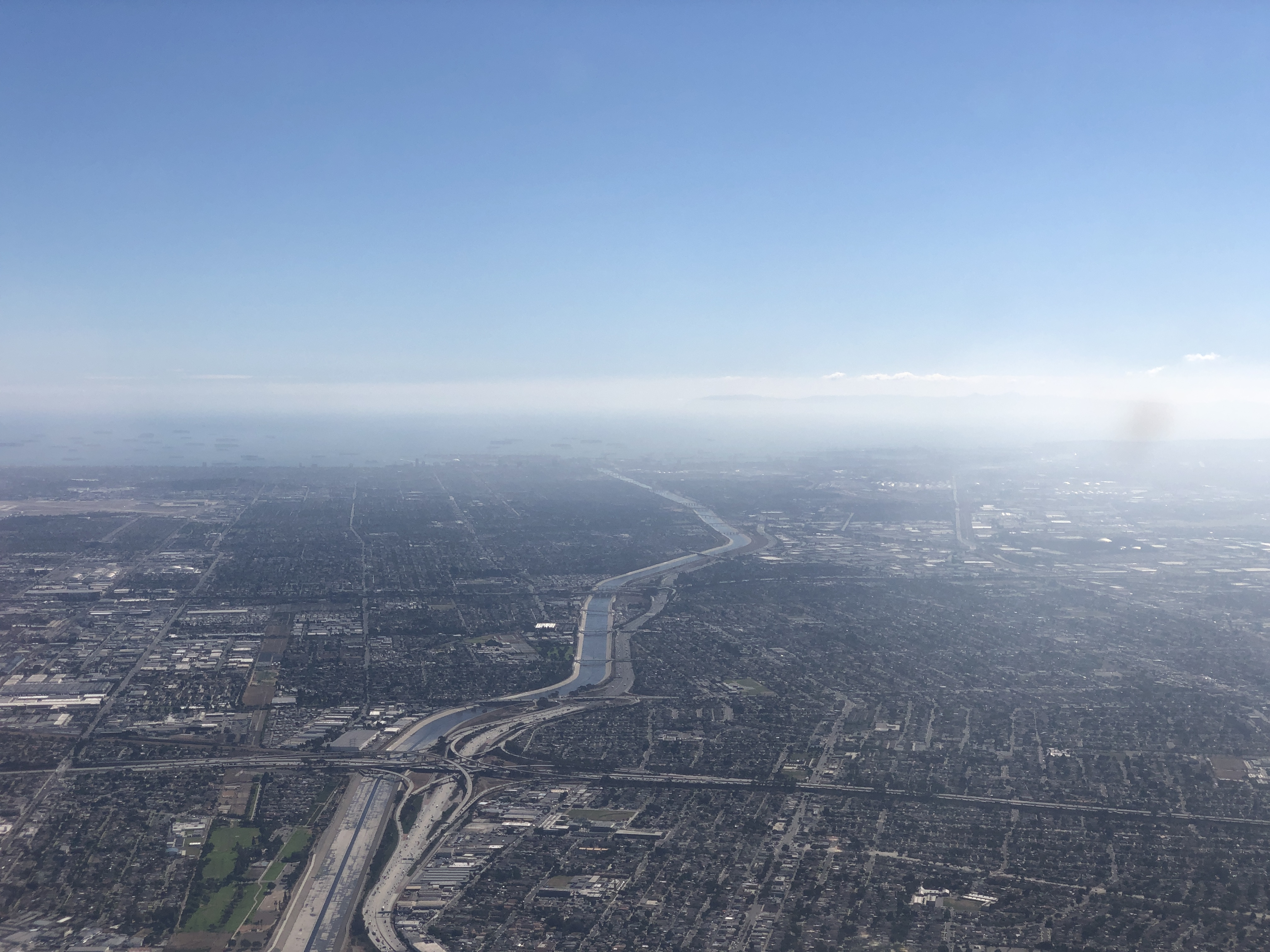
LA River in October 2021

Despite the heavy flood flows of the river during winter months, the LA river has become a refuge for marginalized communities, such as migrant, homeless, and diverse sociocultural communities. For a time, the river itself was a geographical divide between East L.A., which is largely Latino, and predominantly white, wealthy West L.A. These minority groups established themselves along the banks of the river, using fish for food. A distinguished link between the LA river and marginalization can be seen through time as a 1909 New York Times article describes these communities as poor transient communities that consume diseased fish to sustain themselves.

Highway construction along the river (such as the 710) the 1950s and 1960s displaced about 250,000 residents. This construction lead to worse air quality and increased exposure to diseases that inhibit good health.

== Points of interest ==
Sepulveda Basin is a flood-control basin to manage floodwater runoff. Except for infrequent but dramatic flood episodes, this dry-land flood control basin, most of which is leased from the Corps by the City of Los Angeles Department of Recreation and Parks, plays host to diverse uses today including athletic fields, agriculture, golf courses, a fishing lake, parklands, a sewage treatment facility, and a wildlife reserve.

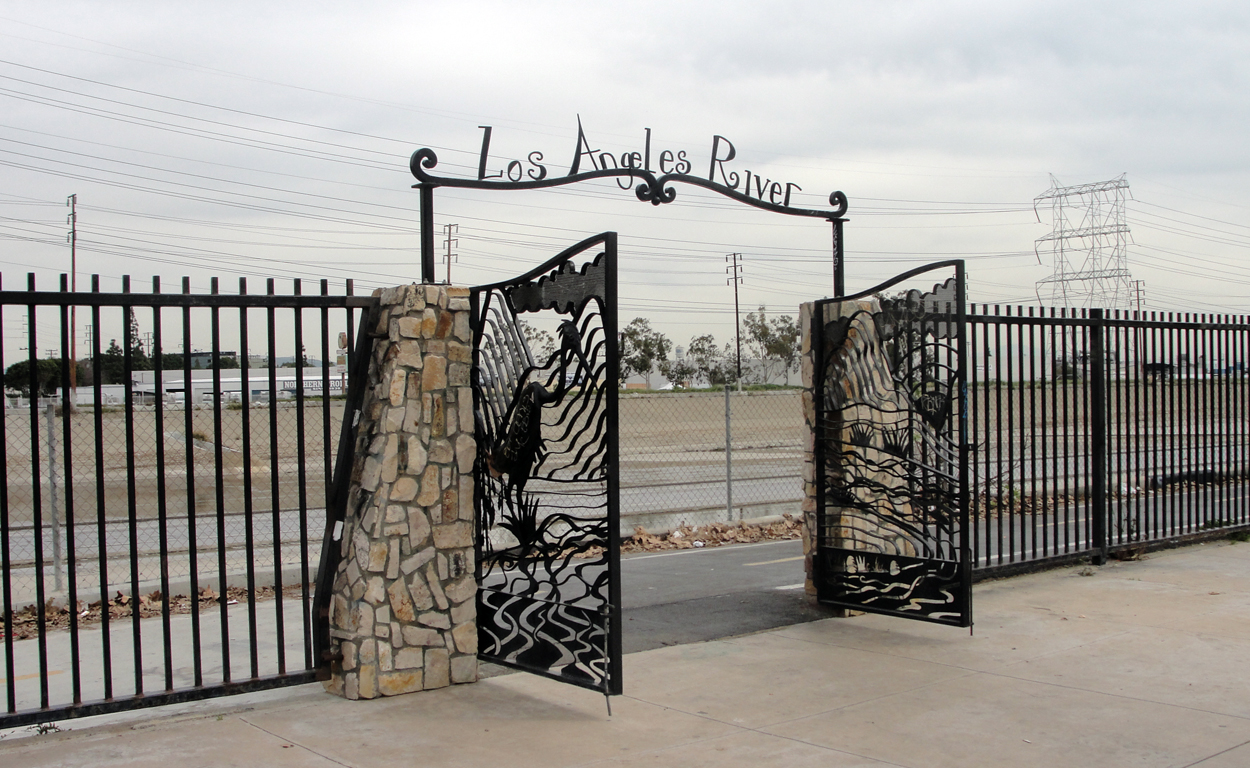
Bike path gate at Riverfront Park

The Los Angeles River bicycle path runs through the Glendale Narrows and is accessible to the public at its north end at Riverside Drive, at Los Feliz Boulevard, and at its south end at Glendale Boulevard, Fletcher Drive and at Egret Park in Elysian Valley. The bike path runs parallel to the 5 freeway for the majority of its length and has mile markers and call boxes for information and safety purposes.

Rio de Los Angeles State Park is north of downtown Los Angeles in the neighborhood of Cypress Park on the east bank of the river. The 247-acre (1.00 km^{2}) park includes restored wetlands featuring native plants as well as recreational activities.

The river's southern stretch forms the heart of an industrial corridor, stretching nearly unbroken from Lincoln Heights to Long Beach. In this area, the busy Long Beach Freeway (I-710) and several high-voltage power lines run within a few hundred feet of the riverbed. Several rail yards are located along the river's banks in this stretch, as well. Just outside the industrial corridor lie some of the most densely populated cities in the state of California, such as the cities of Bell, Bell Gardens, Cudahy, Maywood and South Gate; most of these cities are in the river's flood plain and experienced significant flooding prior to channelization.

=== River parks ===
List of parks, trails and bike paths adjacent to the L.A. River and tributaries:

- Glendale Narrows Elysian Valley Bike Path
- North Valleyheart Riverwalk
- Griffith Park
- Arroyo Seco Bike Path and Kenneth Newell Bikeway
- LARIO
- Tujunga Wash Greenway
- Browns Creek Bike Path
- Whittier Narrows Recreation Area
- Rio Hondo Bike Path
- Hahamongna Watershed Park
- Cudahy River Park
- Marsh Park
- Sunnynook River
- Maywood Riverfront Park
- Zev Yaroslavsky L.A. River Greenway Trail
- Los Angeles Riverfront Park and Pathway
- Los Angeles River Center and Gardens
- Ernie's Walk

== Wildlife ==
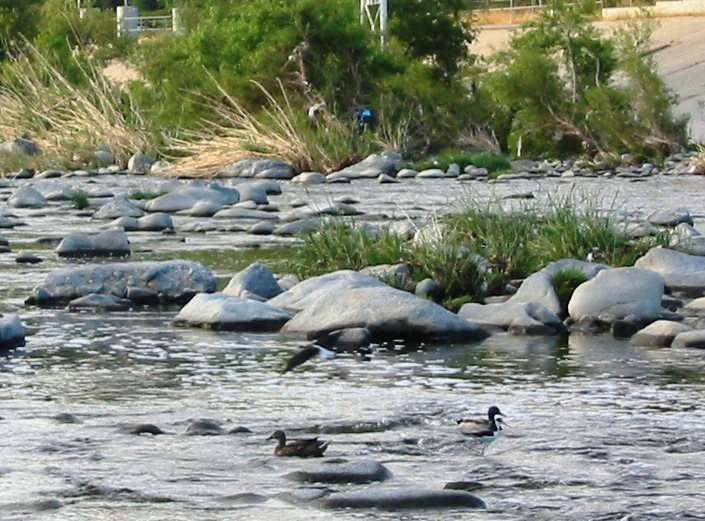
Mallards on the river

Historically, the native species of fish in the Los Angeles River included rainbow/steelhead trout (Oncorhynchus mykiss), Pacific lamprey, threespine stickleback (Gasterosteus aculeatus), Santa Ana sucker (Pantosteus santaanae), Santa Ana speckled dace (Rhinichthys gabrielino), and Arroyo Chub (Gila orcuttii). In 1877 Archduke Ludwig Salvator of Austria published a book about his 1876 visit to Los Angeles, entitled Los Angeles in Südcalifornien. Eine Blume aus dem goldenen Land (Los Angeles in Southern California. A Flower from the Golden Land) which included a description of the fish in the Los Angeles River: "the salmon, Quinnat salmon (Salmo quinnat), abundant between November and June; two kinds of trout, the brook trout (Salar iridea); and the salmon trout (Ptychocheilus grandis)." These three species are known today as the Chinook salmon, steelhead/rainbow trout, and Sacramento pikeminnow. The native species of the Los Angeles River were extirpated by the conversion of the natural riverbed into a concrete trapezoidal channel in 1938. The last known native species to be caught in the river was a rainbow trout in 1940 by a local fisherman.

The freshwater shrimp Syncaris pasadenae was historically endemic to a few smaller tributaries in the middle basin, but went extinct due to channelization and other habitat changes.

There is an abundance today of non-native fish species in the Los Angeles River, including common carp, largemouth bass, tilapia, green sunfish, Amazon sailfin catfish, bluegill, black bullhead, brown bullhead, channel catfish, fathead minnow, crayfish, and mosquito fish. However, Arroyo chub, which was once thought gone since the channelization, has made small appearances throughout parts of the Los Angeles River, Most recent being in the area of Balboa Lake/Anthony C. Beilenson Park in the surrounding channels such as Bull Creek, Woodley Creek and around the creeks and main body of the Sepulveda Basin Wildlife Reserve.

There is also a large variety of bird species in the Los Angeles River, including snowy egret, great egret, black-necked stilt, great blue heron, green heron, mallard, cinnamon teal, American coot, Muscovy duck, white pelican, Canada goose, osprey, California high desert mourning dove, black-chinned hummingbird, barn owl, and red tailed hawk. All of these species either nest or live off of the resources of the river. Before channelization, the river supported a variety of mammals, including the California golden bear (removed 1897), grey wolf (removed 1890s), coyote, mule deer, and North American beaver.

There is indirect evidence that North American beaver (Castor canadensis) were native to the river, as the Beñemé (Mojave) and Jeniguechi (San Jacinto branch of the Cahuilla) Indians of the San Gabriel Mission were described by Father Pedro Font on the second de Anza Expedition in 1776, "The costume of the men in heathendom is total nakedness, while the women wear a bit of deer skin with which they cover themselves, and likewise an occasional cloak of beaver or rabbit skin, although the fathers endeavor to clothe the converted Indians with something as best they can." The Tongva or Gabrieleño Indians of Mission San Gabriel had a word for beaver To-le-vah-che.

== Revitalization ==
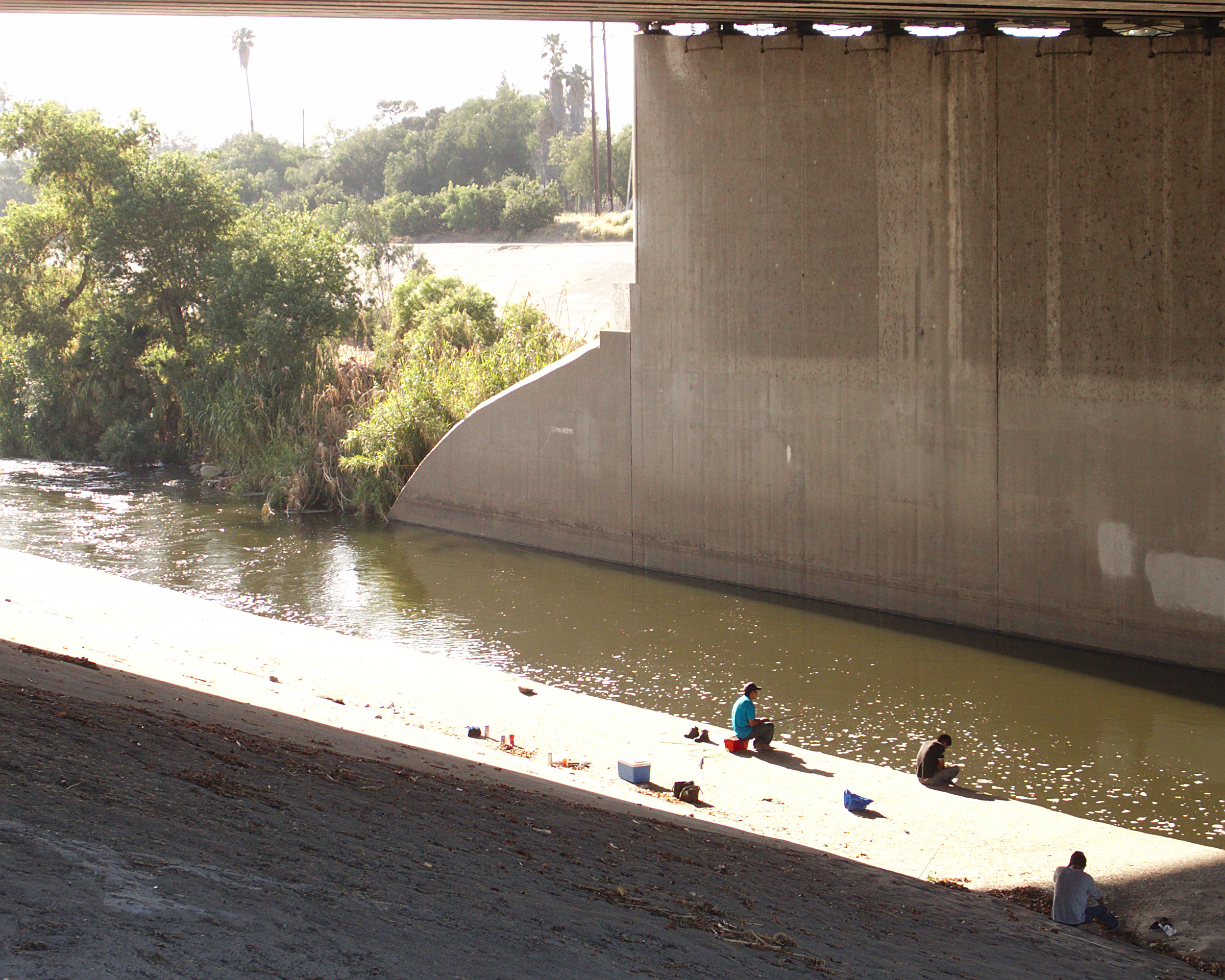
People fishing in the Elysian Valley River Recreation Zone, 2014

The ongoing efforts to revitalize the river began in earnest in approximately 2002. A number of city and county departments, committees and non-profit organizations have led the revitalization efforts. Since the 1938 floods and the subsequent concreting of the river channel, actual restoration of the river to its natural state is no longer possible or necessarily desirable, in most of the 51-mile river, lest new flooding occur.

Studies in the 1980s included a freeway to be used during the dry season to alleviate traffic congestion, and use as a path for hovercraft.

In 2011, the creation of the L.A. River Recreation Zone legalized recreational use in the area. Since then, there have been countless projects to restore recreational use, including a 2.5 mile section of the Glendale Narrows that opened to the public for unrestricted recreational use between Memorial Day and Labor Day in 2013. In May 2014 it was announced that two sections of the river would again be open for recreational use during the summer.

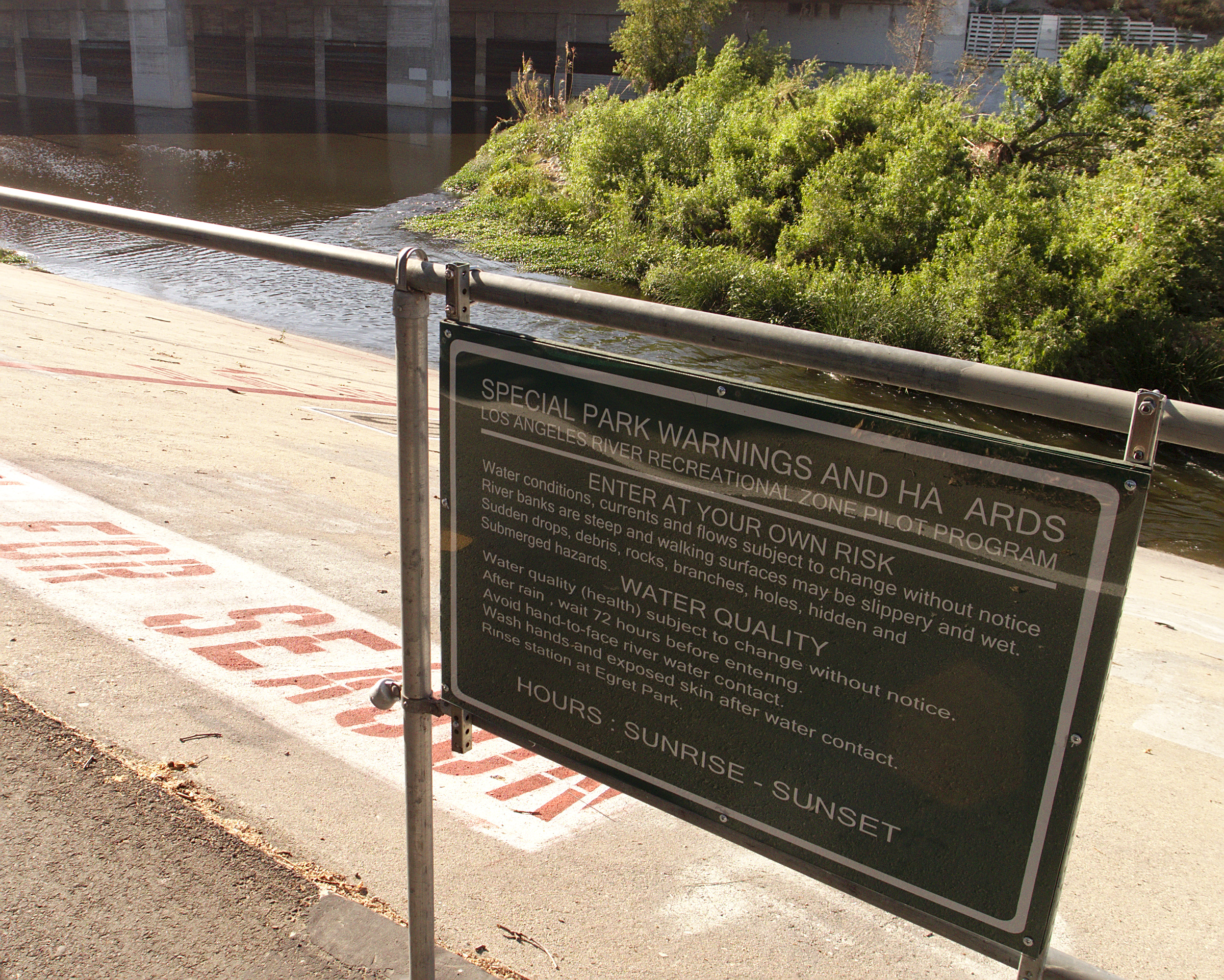
Sign at the northern access point of the Elysian Valley River Recreation Zone cautioning against contact with water

The Los Angeles City Council formed an ad hoc committee in 2002 to focus on accessing and revitalizing the river that was chaired by Councilmember Ed Reyes. The California Coastal Conservancy, a state agency, published its Los Angeles River Park and Recreation Study in 1993, identifying potential projects along the river. In 2006, Los Angeles Mayor Villaraigosa visited South Korea to look at their river restoration project for the Cheonggyecheon.

As a result of the Ad Hoc River Committee's efforts, and with funding from the Los Angeles Department of Water and Power, the City of Los Angeles' Department of Public Works - Bureau of Engineering issued a request for proposals in 2005 for the preparation of a Revitalization Master Plan, which would identify proposals that would make the Los Angeles River a "front door" to the city, and support civic activities. The city's Los Angeles River Revitalization Master Plan was adopted in 2007.

One of the key recommendations made by the master plan was the establishment of a non-profit development corporation, with a board appointed by the then-Mayor Antonio Villaraigosa and certain members of the L.A. City Council, to carry out many of its recommended projects. In September 2009, the first board meeting of the LA River Revitalization Corporation was held. Startup funding was provided by the CRA. Harry B. Chandler was elected first chair of the board, and Omar Brownson was hired in 2010 to be the founding executive director. The first development project undertaken by LARRC was creating a public-private partnership to create the first pedestrian, bike and equestrian bridge across the river. Developer Mort La Kretz provided the seed financing for the bridge, which was built next to the Golden State (5) Freeway in Elysian Valley by the Los Angeles Bureau of Engineering and completed in 2020.

On July 23, 2013, the LARRC announced a goal of completing a continuous 51-mile (82 km) greenway and bike path along the river by the end of the decade. The path is envisioned to be the central focus of a linear recreational park as well as providing an alternative transportation path through Los Angeles.

The Los Angeles Times first reported in 2015 that the renowned architect Frank Gehry was collaborating with the LARRC (whose name was changed to River LA). In 2017, Gehry Partners and River LA produced an informational database on the river known as the LA River Index.

In 2018, the County of Los Angeles opted to update their River Masterplan. Geosyntec was hired to lead the effort, with Gehry Partners, RiverLA and OLIN taking on additional responsibilities. In 2019, Gehry revealed to Alta Magazine that he is working on designing several projects along the river, including a cultural center in South Gate.

On September 13, 2013, the Army Corps of Engineers recommended a $453 million plan to restore nearly 600 acres of wildlife habitat – much of that located between Griffith Park and Lincoln Heights – as the best option to restore the river's ecosystem while preserving the flood protection provided by the concrete encasement. Subsequently, all Federal funding for the plan has been on hold. In early 2016, there was some dispute as to federal funding for river cleanup after winter storms. As part of Proposition 68 in California in June 2018, later that year, grants were given for the cleanup of invasive plants along part of the river. As a result, in 2018, Los Angeles and its LARiverWorks policy team had a project underway for "every mile of the river within city limits, aiming to improve connectivity, increase open space, and restore habitat. New bridges and trails will accommodate people on foot, bikes, or horseback." Plans to cleanup 11 miles of river north of downtown Los Angeles, in the hopes of attracting steelhead trout, will cost $1.1 billion. In February 2019, the Los Angeles County Flood Control District was informing the federal government that it wanted to take control of about 40 miles of channels owned by the U.S. Army Corps of Engineers.

=== 2020 LA River Master Plan ===
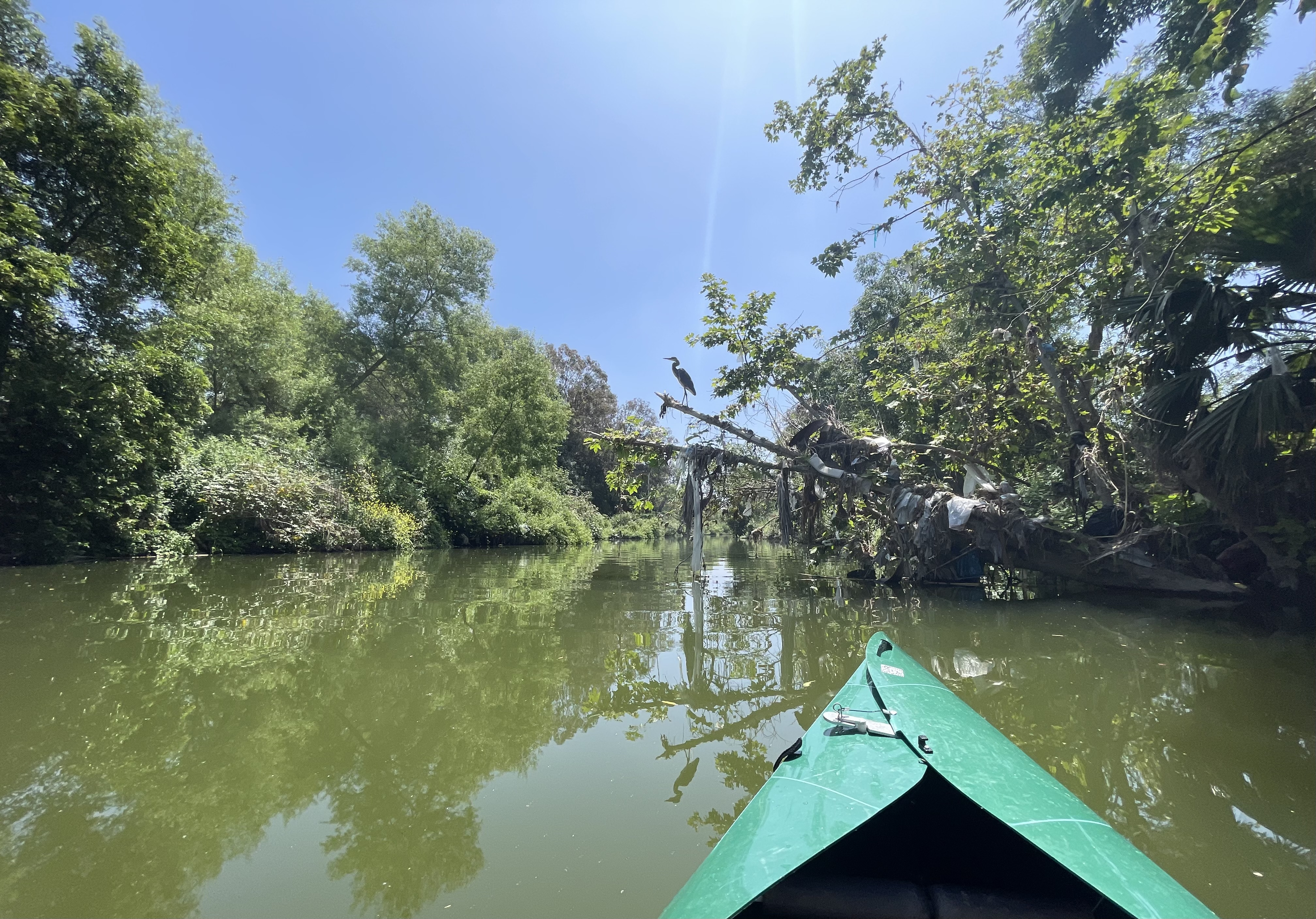
Blue Heron in a revitalized portion of the river, in the Sepulveda Basin

In 2020, Los Angeles County released an updated LA River Master Plan detailing plans for the river over the next 25 years. The current plan addresses 9 goals related to flood risk, parks, ecosystems, access, arts and culture, housing, engagement and education, water supply, and water quality. The plan for decreasing flood risk consists of preserving and increasing flood risk capacity, reducing flow into the river, incorporating climate change research, and increasing emergency planning, public awareness, and management practices. In order to create inclusive, open areas, LA county's actions include making 51 continuous miles of open space, finishing the LA River Trail, providing amenities, implementing multi-use functionality, and promoting public safety. The third goal of the 2020 LA River Master Plan is to support flourishing ecosystems by increasing habitat and ecosystem function, improve plant biodiversity including native species, connecting habitat to support wildlife, and increasing environmentally-friendly practices. The LA county goal of equal access to the river is outlined by creating access points and gateways and promoting safe transportation to the river. The objective of enhancing arts and culture is planned to be achieved by creating a 51-mile arts and culture corridor, identifying and supporting cultures, and involving artists and cultural groups in the design process. The next goal outlined in the LA River Master Plan addresses impacts to the housing economy and the homeless community through incorporating the Affordable Housing Coordinating Committee in planning, creating mapping and assessment tools, increasing affordable housing, securing funding, and enhancing outreach to homeless populations. The actions to enhance engagement and education include providing spaces for all ages to learn, developing new educational materials, involving aspects from indigenous peoples, and promoting the river as an economic asset to nearby communities. The eighth goal in the master plan is to improve water supply through diverting and treating stormwater and dry weather flows before they flow into the river, supporting efficient water usage, creating better operations, maintenance, and measures. The final goal is to improve water quality by developing water quality projects, working with watershed management groups, raising public awareness, and improving facility operations and maintenance.

=== Cultural and Architectural Studies ===
In her project, 51 mi + 25 km = 13 ft, Third Gehry Prize winner and M.Arch graduate Sophie Akoury explores the histories of the Los Angeles River through architectural and archival lenses, drawing parallels between the LA and Beirut Rivers and their shared identities as paved urban waterways.

=== Friends of the Los Angeles River ===
Friends of the Los Angeles River (FoLAR) was founded in 1986 by poet and activist Lewis P. Macadams. Originally deemed a "40-year artwork to bring the River back to life," FoLAR was the first organization advocating for habitat restoration and public access on the LA River.

One FoLAR's more prominent ongoing projects is the annual Great LA River Cleanup, which began in 1988 with a group of less than twenty people. In 2017, the Great LA Cleanup had up to 10,000 volunteers over three weekends covering the upper, middle, and lower sections of the river. In 2016, an estimated 5,000 volunteers took part in the annual cleanup, including the mayor and several elected officials. In 2018, more than 6,000 volunteers removed more than 60 tons of trash at nine sites along the Los Angeles River. In 2019, the FoLAR cleanup was the largest river cleanup in the United States. The cleanup marked 30 years in 2019. By the summer of 2019, kayaking in Los Angeles in the river had become common. As of 2018, FoLAR has adopted a year-round cleanup model through partnerships with other environmental organizations like Heal the Bay, and through service opportunities for corporate groups and large organizations through River Makers program.

In 2012, FoLAR raised a $1 million donation to support the completion of the ARBOR study by the United States Army Corps of Engineers (USACE). This study ultimately resulted in the adoption of Alternative 20, a restoration plan focused on 719 acres of habitat and pedestrian-friendly improvements, among other things.

Friends of the Los Angeles River group highlighted potential harms of unguided restoration without collaboration with the proper ecological authorities when ecological performance artist Doug Rosenberg added rocks to parts of the LA river to trap sediments and slowly convert that section of the river into a wetland. Starting in 2020, Rosenberg openly shared the progress of this project on social media, and several volunteers work with him. Los Angeles Waterkeeper pointed to potential flooding risks.

Volunteer cleanups along the river are also organized by independent groups outside of FoLAR. Such as Clean LA with Me

=== Riverside communities ===
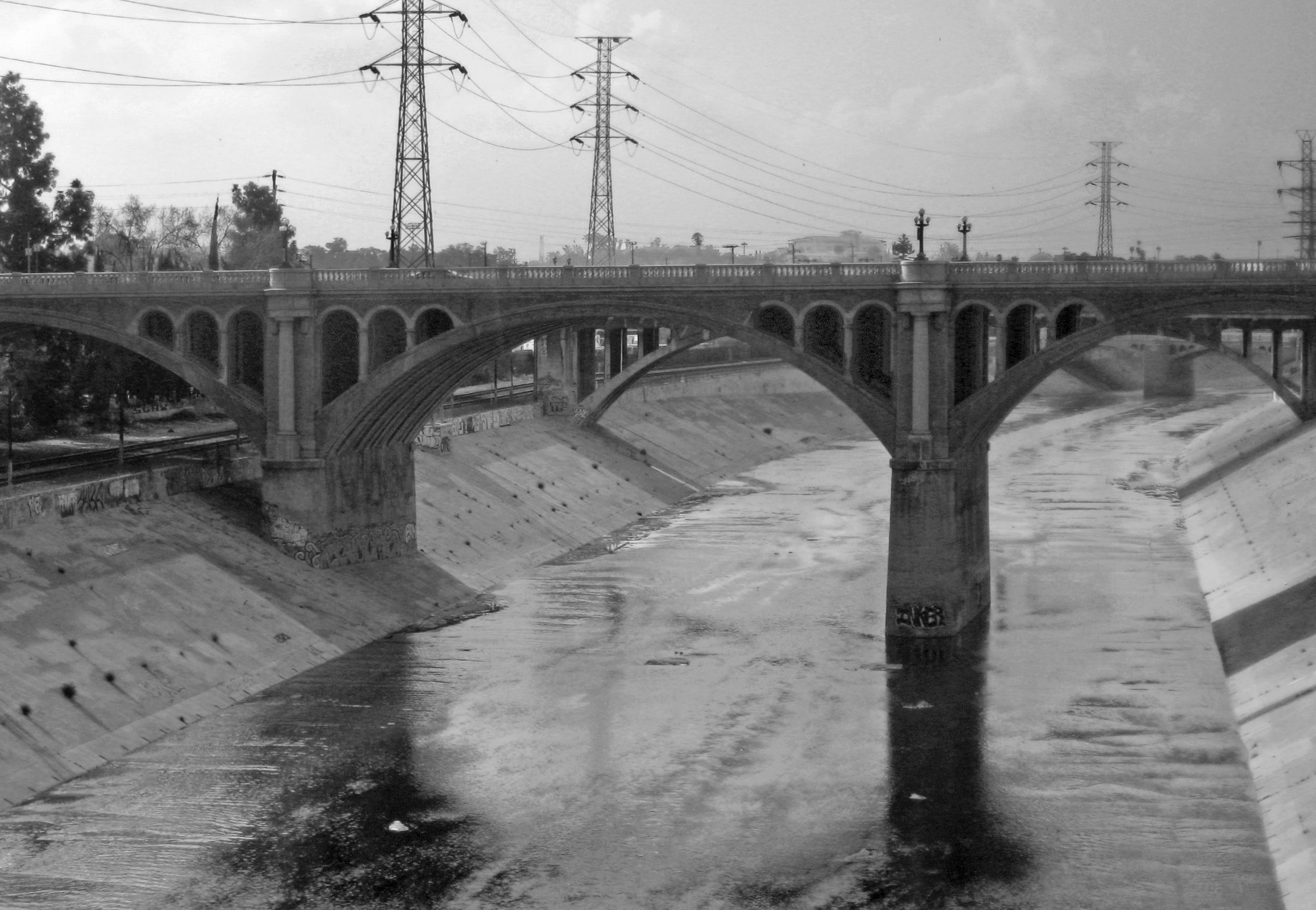
Springtime flow in 2008 at North Broadway-Buena Vista Viaduct (built 1909–11) on the Los Angeles River near Lincoln Heights.

Communities and cities along the banks of the Los Angeles River include:

- Canoga Park
- Winnetka
- Reseda
- Encino
- Lake Balboa
- Van Nuys
- Sherman Oaks
- Studio City
- Universal City
- Toluca Lake
- Burbank
- Glendale
- Los Feliz
- Atwater Village
- Elysian Valley
- Glassell Park
- Cypress Park
- Chinatown
- Lincoln Heights
- Boyle Heights
- Vernon
- East Los Angeles
- South Central Los Angeles
- Maywood
- Commerce
- Bell
- Bell Gardens
- Cudahy
- South Gate
- Lynwood
- Paramount
- Compton
- Long Beach

== In media ==
The car race in the L.A. River culvert from the film Grease is an example of the canalized river's use as a location for films, television series, and music videos.

Numerous films, television programs, music videos, commercials and video games have featured various sites along the Los Angeles River. Since the river is a trickle for much of the year and the culvert is dry, it is often used as a setting for races, car chases, gang rumbles, and other scenes requiring an open, deserted setting within the city.

The following have scenes filmed or set within the culvert:

- Ambulance
- Blue Thunder
- Chinatown
- Double Nickels
- Earthquake
- Grease
- Point Blank
- Repo Man
- The Gumball Rally
- The Italian Job
- Them!
- This Christmas (2007 film)

The river is featured in Visiting... with Huell Howser Episode 218.

TV series highlighting the river include The Beverly Hillbillies, Knight Rider , CHiPs, Terminator: The Sarah Connor Chronicles, Penny Dreadful: City of Angels, American Horror Story: Apocalypse, the fifteenth season of The Amazing Race, as well as the seventh, sixteenth season of Hell's Kitchen, and The Stranger.

The following music videos have included sections filmed in the river:

- Don't Cha by Pussycat Dolls
- Stay the Night by Chicago
- Call My Name by Cheryl
- Wherever You Will Go by The Calling
- Gold Cobra by Limp Bizkit
- Mein by Deftones
- Got the Life by Korn
- Shelter by FINNEAS
- Mr. Jinx by Quarashi
- One Love by Blue

Video games include the racing game series Midnight Club with Midnight Club 2 and Midnight Club: Los Angeles and the action-adventure games Grand Theft Auto: San Andreas and Grand Theft Auto V (both of which feature depictions of the river within the fictional city of Los Santos). Additionally, the game L.A. Noire is set in 1940s Los Angeles and features the river as a location for missions and is available in Free Roam.

The house used for exterior shots of Brady's home in the sitcom The Brady Bunch at 11222 North Dilling Street in North Hollywood, has the bank of the river as the edge of its backyard.

== Gallery ==
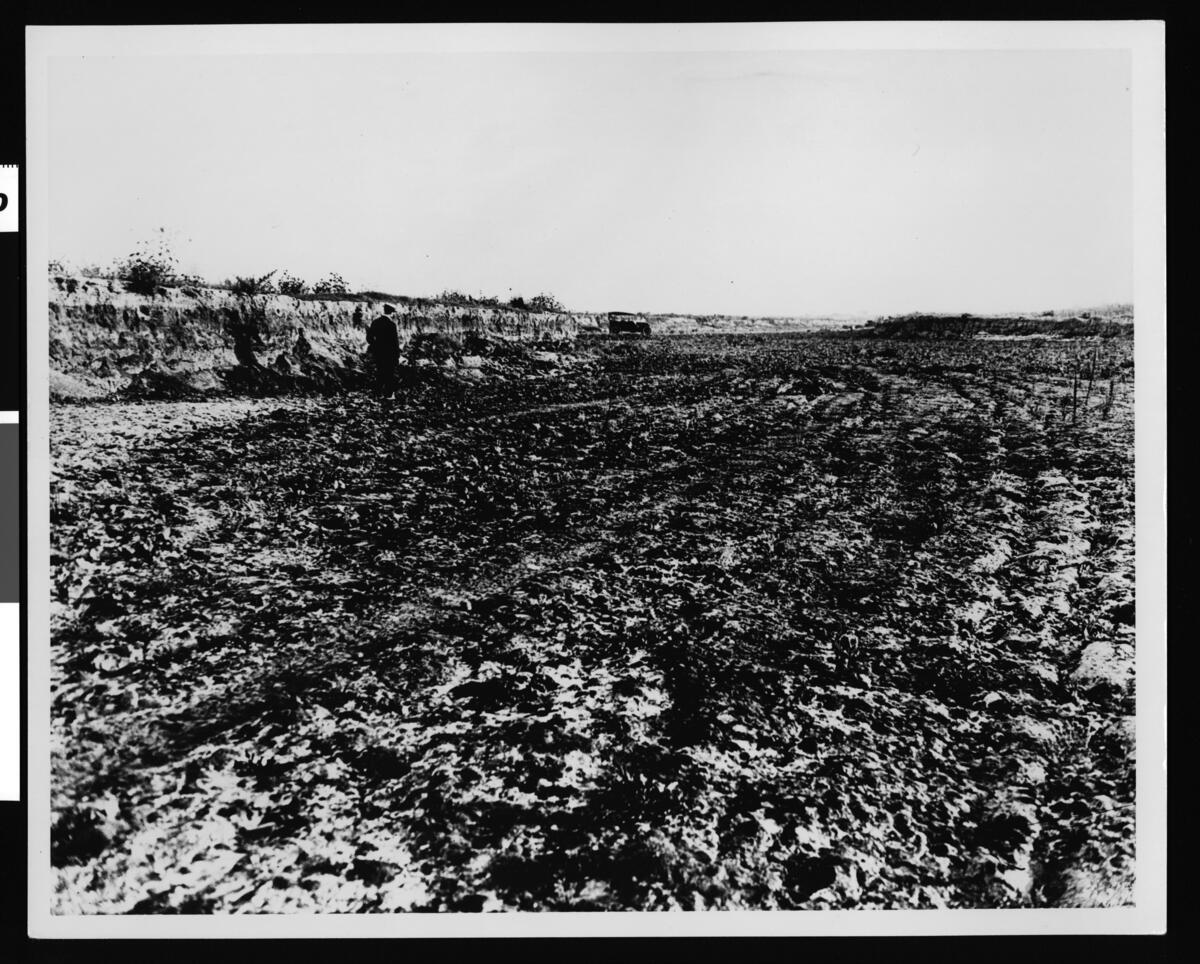
Channel cut through Dominguez lands by a flood on the Los Angeles River, about 1500 feet north of Watson station, 1916

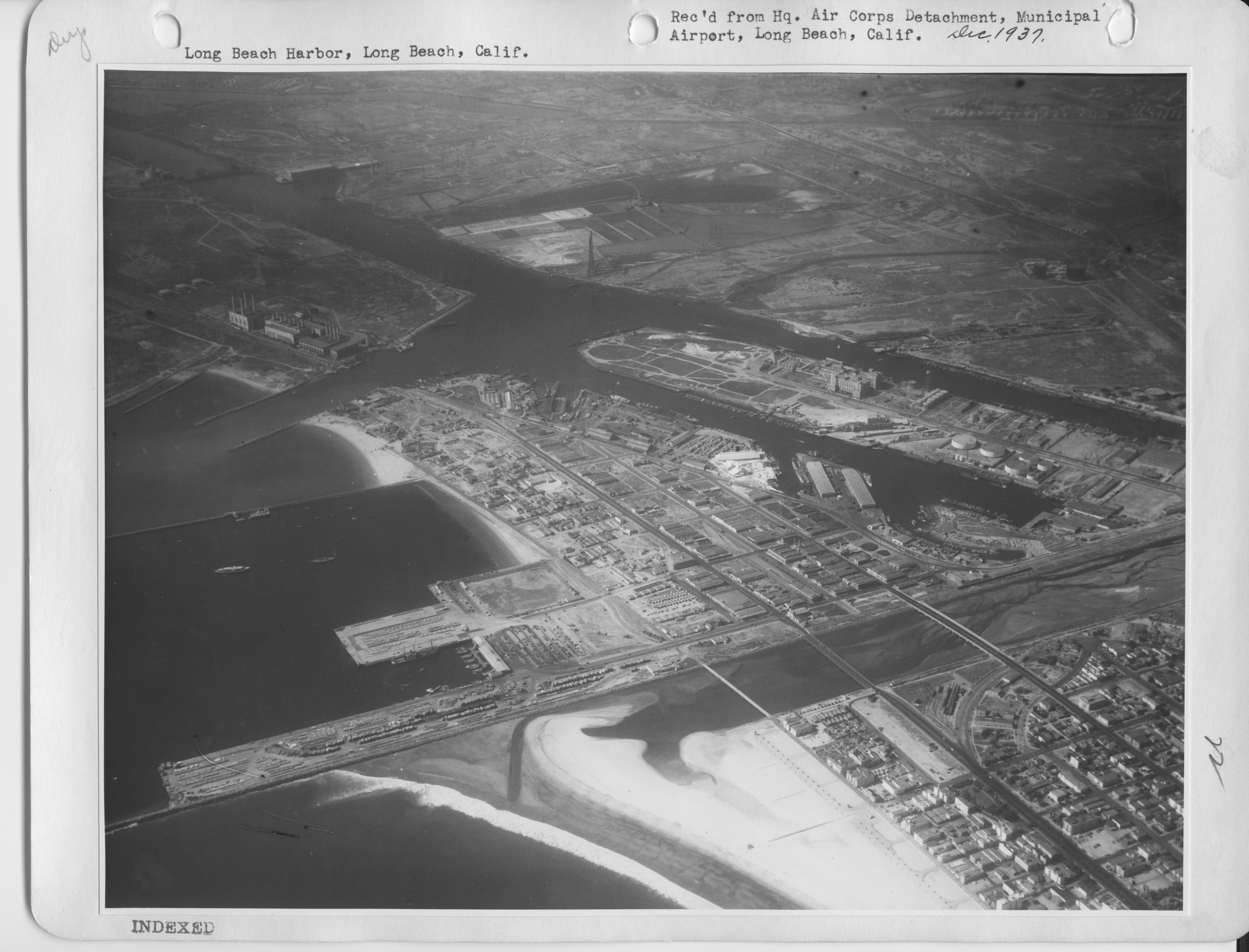
The mouth of the Los Angeles River in 1937, in the foreground; the Back Channel, Port of Long Beach, in the background

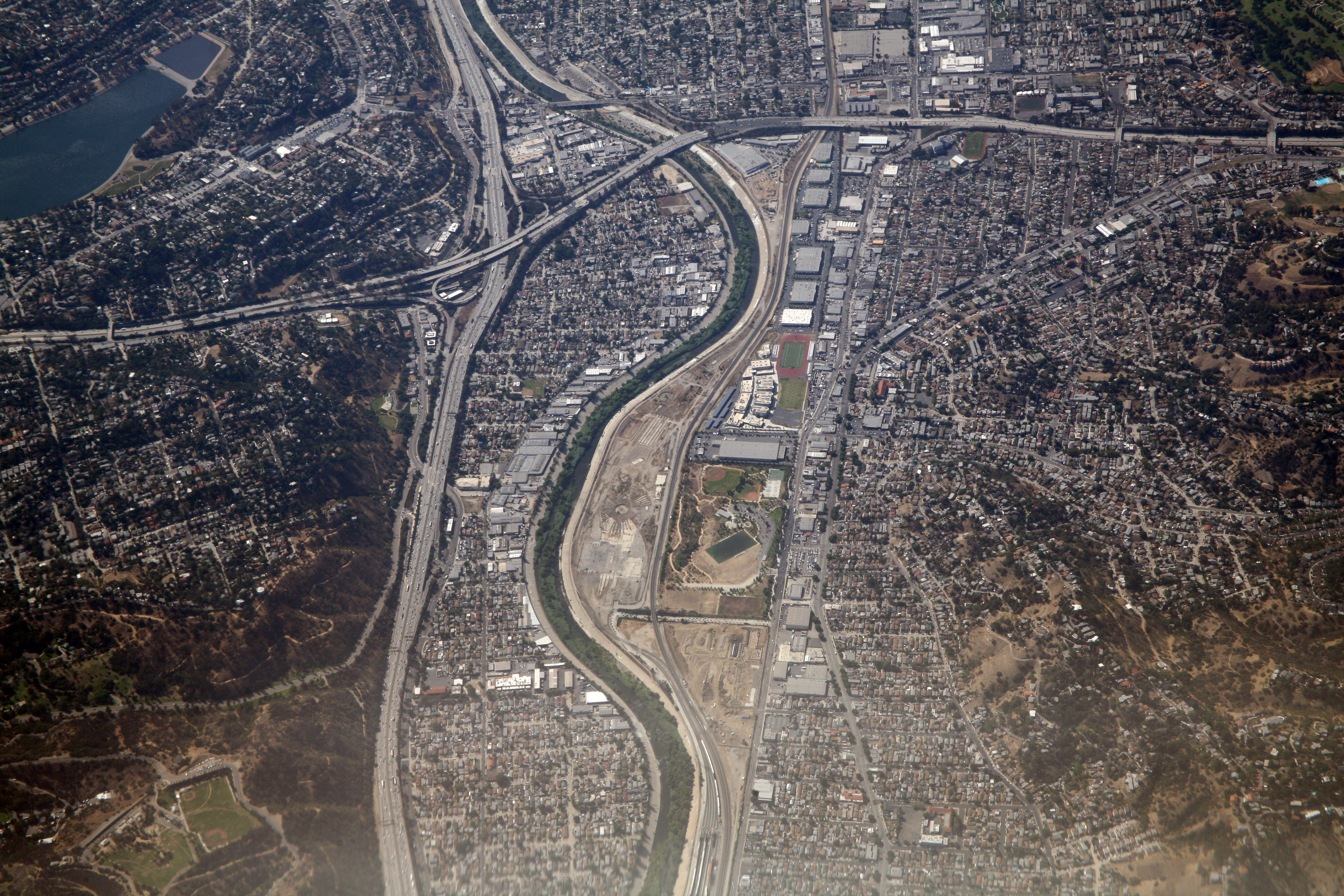
Interstate 5, the Golden State Freeway. Glassell Park is on the right, Frogtown and Silver Lake is on the left. The Los Angeles River runs through the middle.

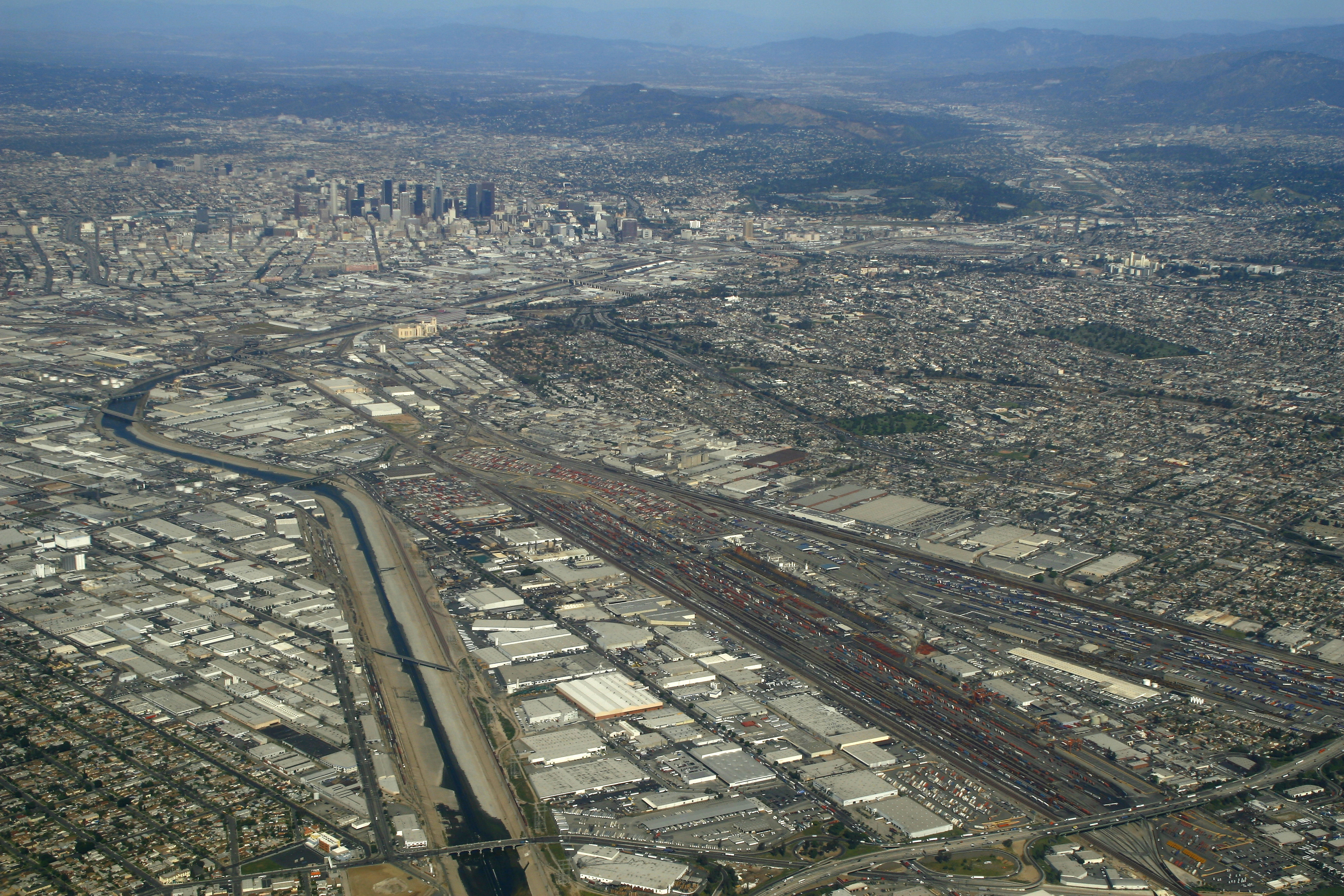
A paved river and railroads lead into downtown Los Angeles.

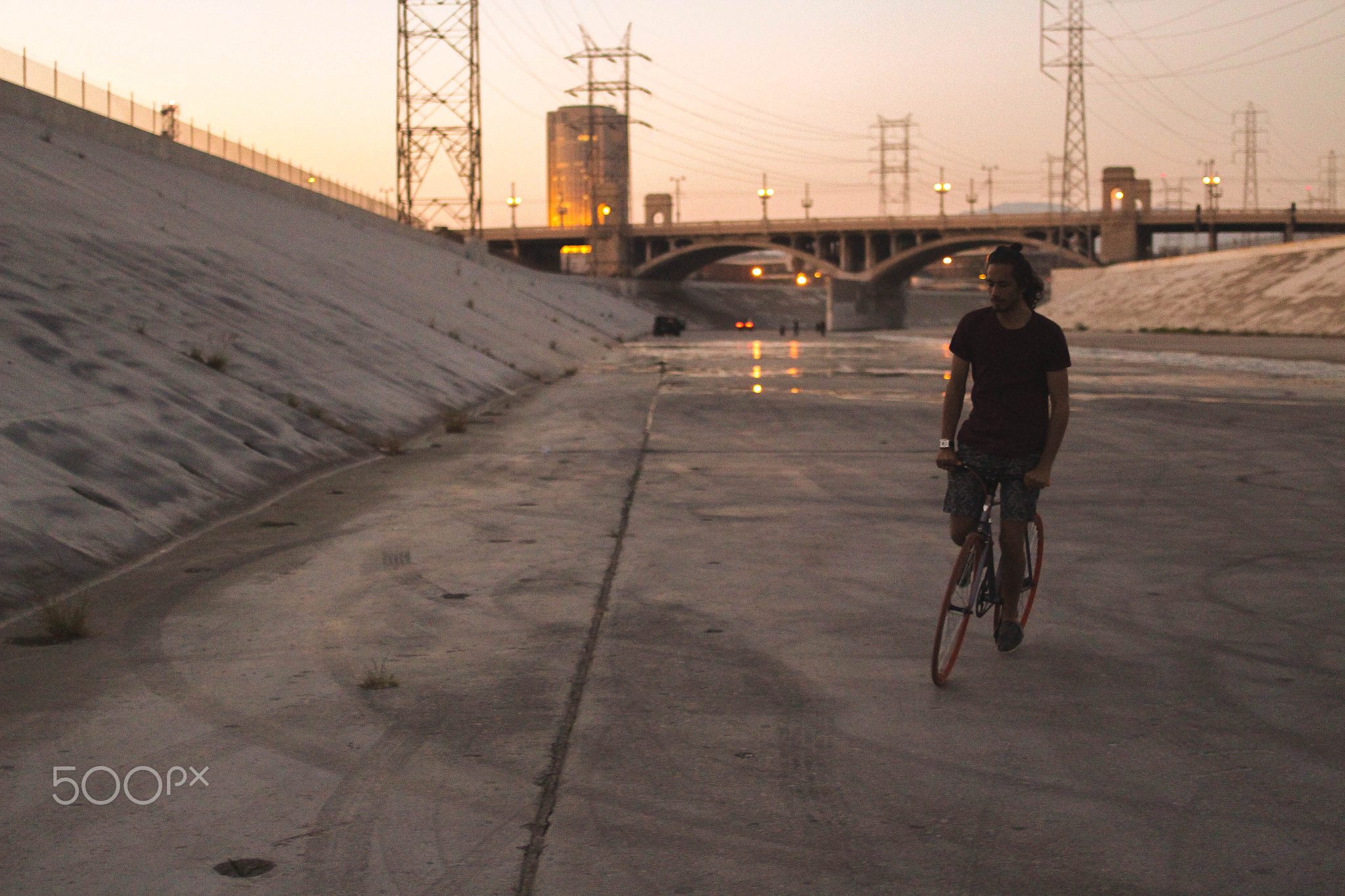
River channel at sunset

Satellite photo of the river in Long Beach

== See also ==
- List of rivers of California
- List of Los Angeles bike paths
