= Browns Canyon Wash =

Coordinates: 34.19528°N 118.58140°W

Browns Canyon Wash (Browns Canyon Creek)

Location
- Country: United States

Physical characteristics
- Source
  - location: Santa Susana Mountains, Los Angeles County, California
- Mouth
  - location: Los Angeles River, San Fernando Valley, Los Angeles, California
- Length: 10.3 mi (16.6 km)

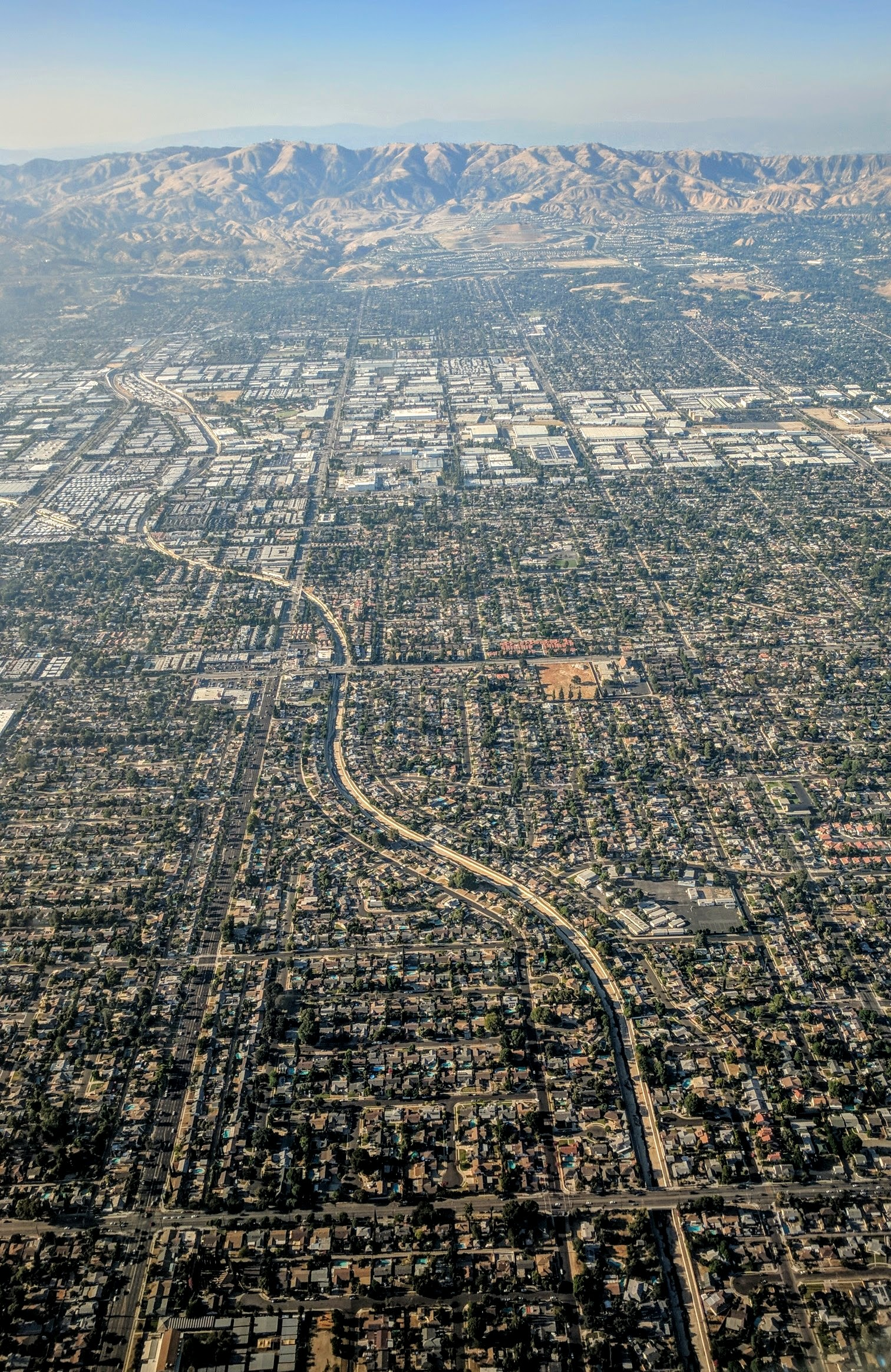
Aerial view of Browns Canyon Wash (the curving feature) crossing the San Fernando Valley

Browns Canyon Wash, also known as Browns Canyon Creek, is a 10.3-mile-long (16.6 km) tributary of the Los Angeles River in the Santa Susana Mountains of Los Angeles County and across the western San Fernando Valley of Los Angeles, California.

== Course ==
The stream begins as a free-flowing stream in Browns Canyon of the eastern Santa Susana Mountains, partially within Michael D. Antonovich Regional Park at Joughlin Ranch. It runs along Browns Canyon Road, which leads to the Cold War Oat Mountain Nike missile base site, on the border of the Chatsworth and Porter Ranch communities.

After passing under the State Route 118 (Ronald Reagan Memorial Freeway), it is then encased in a concrete flood control channel, traveling southwards through Chatsworth, Canoga Park, and Winnetka. Its confluence with the Los Angeles River is just west of Mason Avenue and north of Vanowen Avenue. The channel walls near Winnetka were damaged in the 1994 Northridge earthquake.

The wash features an equestrian and bicycle path along its eastern bank in Chatsworth.

=== Crossings and tributaries ===
From mouth to source (year built in parentheses):

- Sherman Way (1971)
- Valerio Street [Pedestrian Bridge]
- Saticoy Street (1971)
- near Arminta Street [Pedestrian Bridge]
- Roscoe Boulevard (1971)
- De Soto Avenue (1972)
- Santa Susana Creek enters
- Parthenia Street (1972)
- Nordhoff Street (1971)
- Railroad: Amtrak Coast Starlight, Pacific Surfliner / Metrolink Ventura County Line
- Lassen Street (1971)
- Devonshire Street/Canoga Avenue (1974)
- Chatsworth Street (1972)
- Variel Avenue (1973)
- Rinaldi Street (1973)
- State Route 118 (Simi Valley Freeway) offramp to De Soto Avenue (1971)
- State Route 118 - Ronald Reagan Freeway (1971)
- Browns Canyon Road

== See also ==
- Rivers of Los Angeles County, California
