= North Valleyheart Riverwalk =

Park in Los Angeles, CA

Coordinates: 34°8′50″N 118°25′2″W

North Valleyheart Riverwalk is a linear park in the San Fernando Valley area of Los Angeles County, California. The park is located on north side of the Los Angeles River roughly parallel to Ventura Boulevard through the Studio City and Sherman Oaks neighborhoods.

Prior to redevelopment the space was used by locals walking their dogs but had no formal access points, paths or seating. "With several convenient access points this previous eyesore is a beautiful dose of green in the heart of Studio City." Access gates including staircases and/or ADA-accessible ramps are now available at Fulton, Ethel, and Coldwater Canyon Avenues. A bike path is planned for the south bank of the river, opposite the park.

The Big Toad Gate, the Rattlesnake Wall, and the Steelhead Trout Mural, are among the attractions. The mural is made from "about 40,000 hand-picked local stones."

The project was organized and funded by the Los Angeles County Flood Control District in cooperation with the local non-profit Village Gardeners of the Los Angeles River.

"LACFCD attributes successful maintenance of the site mainly to the Village Gardeners and their volunteers. The nonprofit relies on donations and the sale of advertising space along the Riverwalk to cover the cost of maintenance."

The park is located near the intersection of Coldwater Canyon Avenue and Valleyheart Drive. The street address is 12305 Valleyheart Drive, Studio City, CA 91604. Transit access is via the Metro Los Angeles line 230 stop at Laurel Canyon Boulevard and Valleyheart.

== See also ==
- List of Los Angeles bike paths
