= Los Angeles River bicycle path =

Cycling route in California, USA

Coordinates: 33.79011°N 118.20395°W

Los Angeles River Bike Path
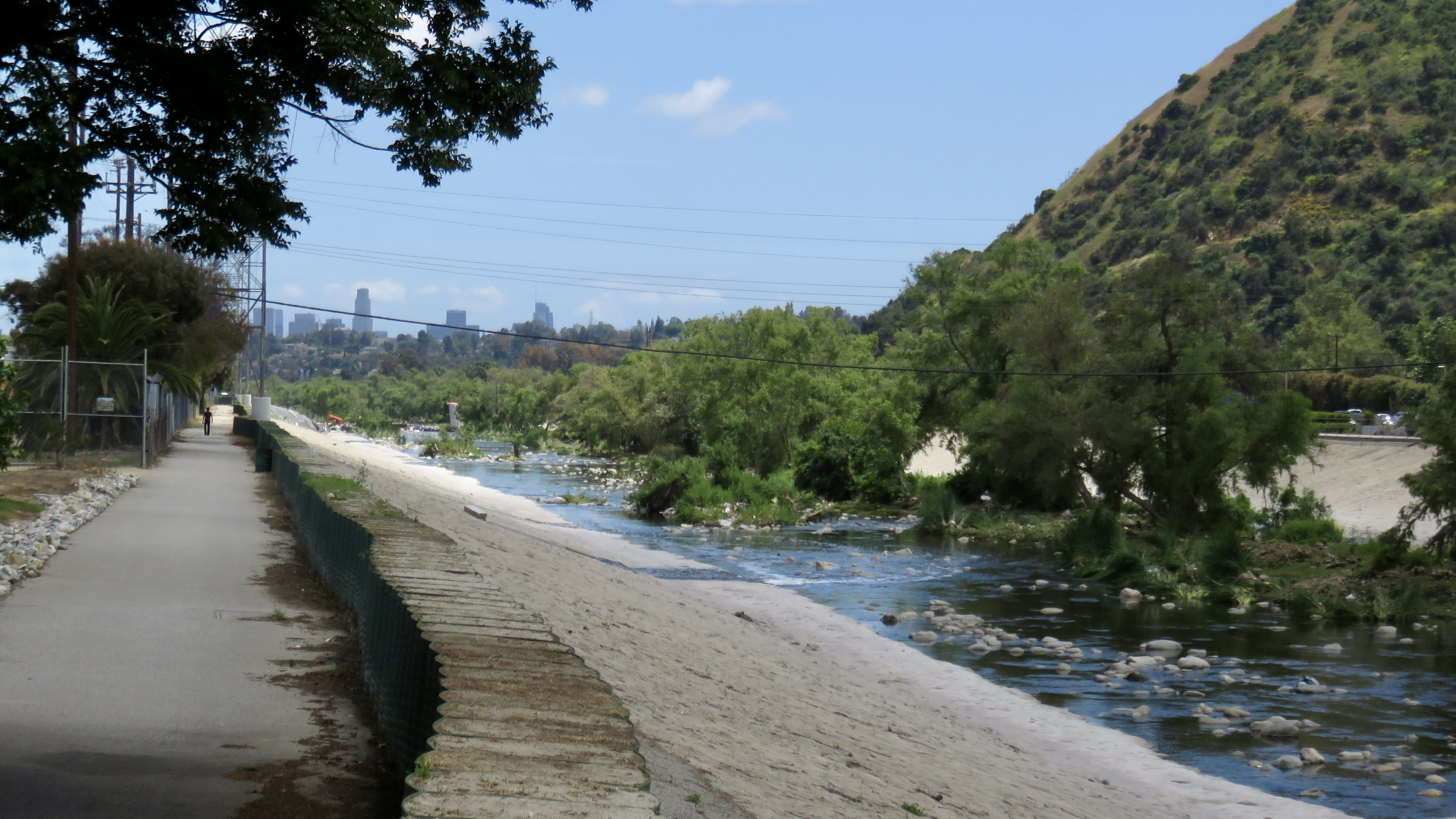
- Path at Glendale Narrows
- Use: Active transportation, road biking, walking, dogs on leash
- Surface: Asphalt

The Los Angeles River bicycle path is a Class I bicycle and pedestrian path in the Greater Los Angeles area running from north to east along the Los Angeles River through Griffith Park in an area known as the Glendale Narrows. The 7.4 mile section of bikeway through the Glendale Narrows is known as the Elysian Valley Bicycle & Pedestrian Path. The bike path also runs from the city of Vernon to Long Beach, California. This section is referred to as LARIO, or more formally, the Los Angeles River Bikeway.

Following the Los Angeles Flood of 1938, concrete banks were created as a flood control measure for nearly all the length of the river, making it essentially navigable by bicycle to its end, where it empties into the San Pedro Bay in Long Beach. In recent years, the Friends of the Los Angeles River, a local civic and environmental group, have attempted to restore portions of the river as parkland in a manner that includes and encourages bicycle and pedestrian traffic, efforts realized in part as local U.S. Representative Brad Sherman secured $460,000 in federal funds to extend the path north in the Sherman Oaks area.

== Path description ==
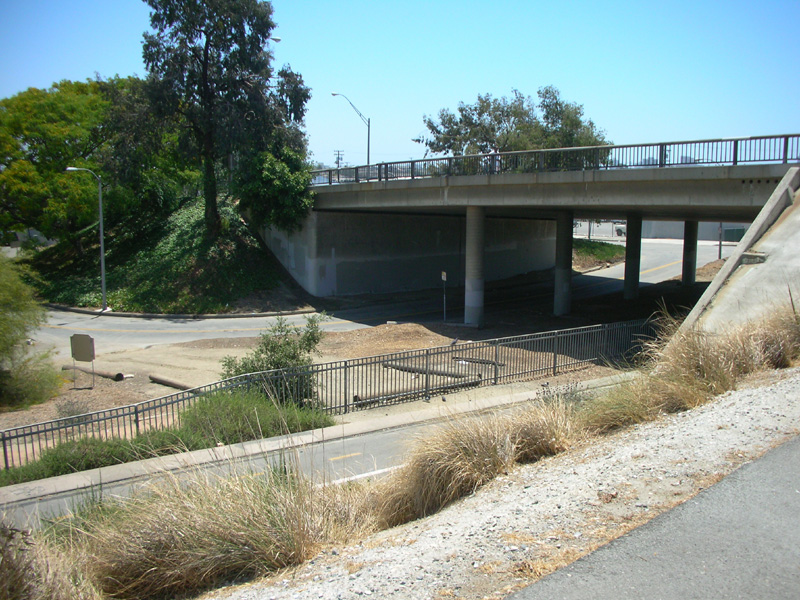
Los Angeles River Bikeway access at the PCH in Long Beach.

The LA River Bicycle Path consists of two main parts and other shorter sections that currently do not connect with each other along the river yet.

The Los Angeles River Revitalization Corporation (LARRC, LA River Corp) had campaigned for Greenway 2020, the completion of bike and walk paths for the entire 51-mile river by the year 2020.

=== Long Beach—Vernon section ===
The Los Angeles River Bikeway, also known as LARIO, is the longest completed section of the bicycle/pedestrian path. It runs from the Shoreline Pedestrian Bikepath at the river's mouth in Long Beach, upstream to the industrial area southeast of Downtown Los Angeles, at Atlantic Boulevard in Vernon.

In Long Beach, the bike path runs on the east side of the river channel. When the path intersects with Imperial Highway, it crosses the LA River on the road bridge and continues north on along the west side of the LA River to Vernon. The path on the east side continues under the bridge to the confluence with the Rio Hondo, becoming the Rio Hondo Bicycle Path heading northeast to the Whittier Narrows Recreation Area.

Mileage markers are painted on the pavement and signs are posted at regular intervals detailing upcoming city streets. Parking can be found at Hollydale Park in South Gate, Ralph C. Dills Park in Paramount, and DeForest Park in Long Beach. Other access in Long Beach includes several street crossings of the river, including those of Pacific Coast Highway, Willow Street, Wardlow Road, and Del Amo Boulevard.

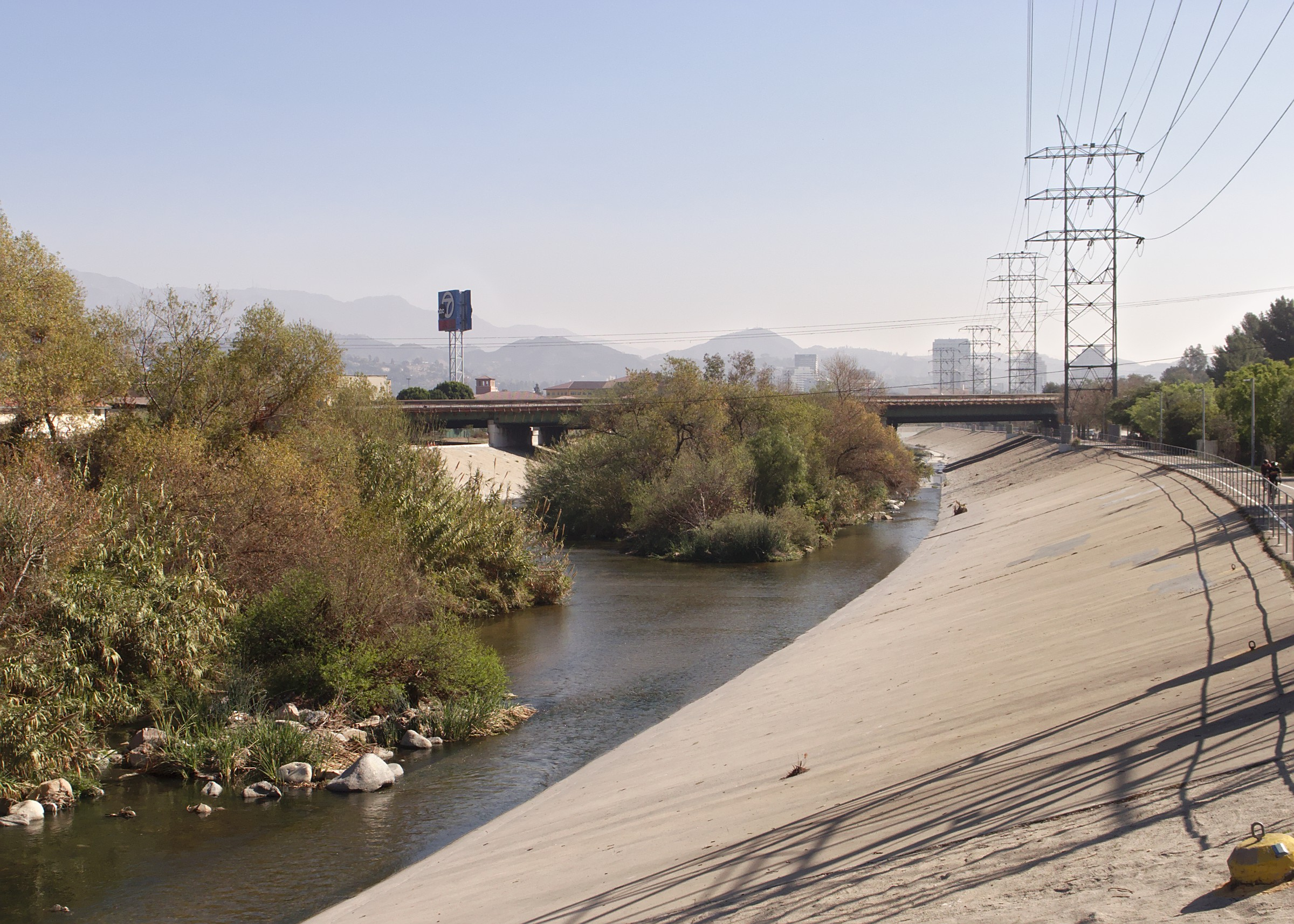
Los Angeles River at Riverside Drive, view east with Glendale Narrows Elysian Valley Bicycle Path (right edge).

=== Glendale Narrows Elysian Valley section ===
The second section, the Glendale Narrows Elysian Valley Bicycle Path and pedestrian walkway, runs alongside the L.A. River for 7.4 miles (11.9 km) from the border of Burbank, California & Glendale, California at Victory Blvd and Riverside Drive downstream through the Glendale Narrows to Egret Park in Elysian Valley. It runs through Glendale, Griffith Park, Los Feliz, Atwater Village and Elysian Valley.

The Baum Bicycle Bridge over the river in Los Feliz was built in 2002.

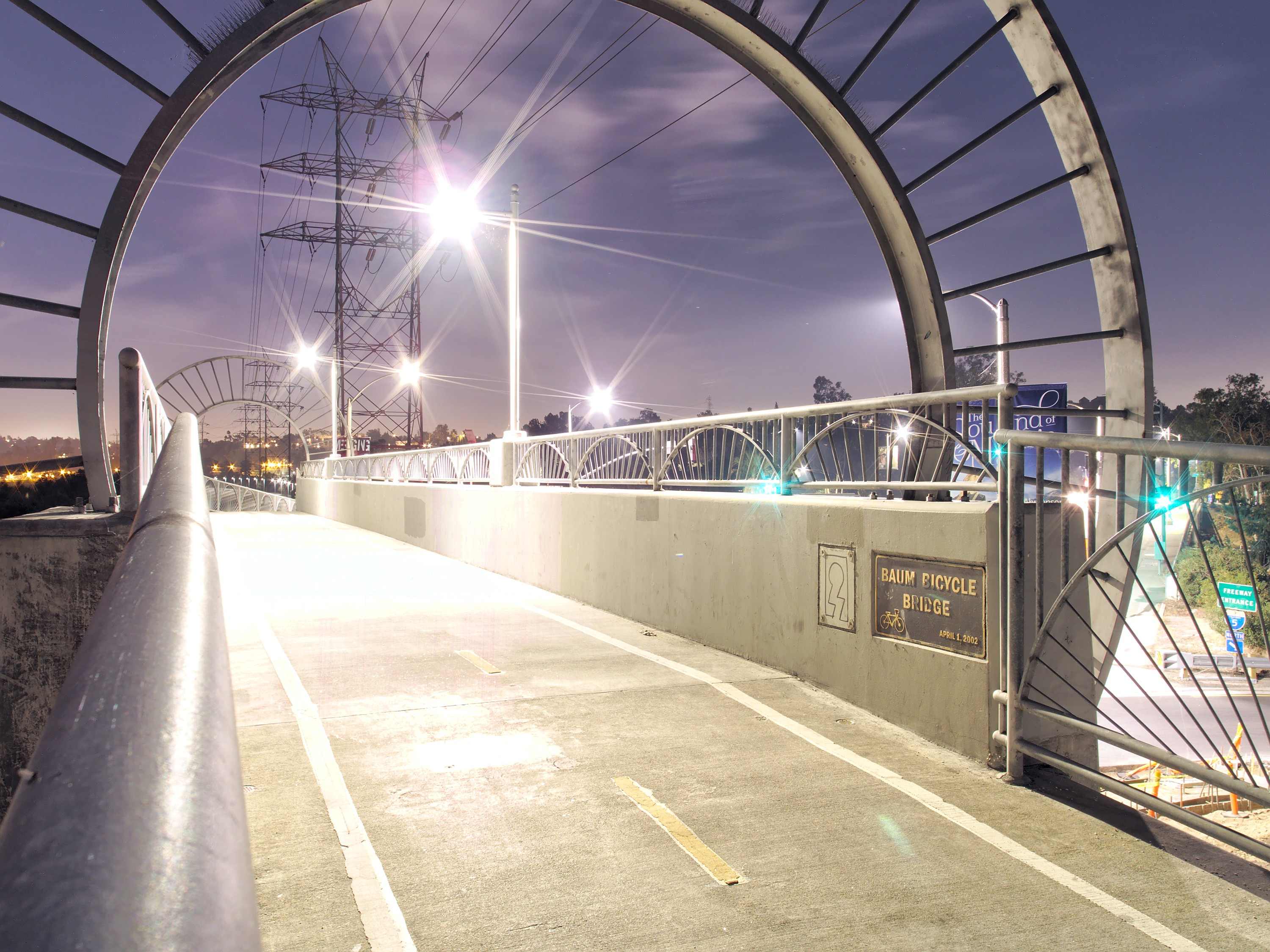
Baum Bicycle Bridge at Los Feliz Boulevard

There are numerous entry points and parks along it, including Rio de Los Angeles State Park, Griffith Park, Egret Park, Oso Park, Steelhead Park, Riverdale Mini-Park, Elysian Valley Gateway Park, Marsh Park, Rattlesnake Park, Crystal Park, and Sunnynook River Park. The Glendale Narrows Riverwalk, a separate multi-use (walk/bike) path, is across the river along the northern bank in the city of Glendale. The non-vehicular Garden Bridge project over the Glendale Narrows will connect the Glendale Narrows Elysian Valley Bicycle Path, Griffith Park, and Los Angeles − with the Glendale Narrows Riverwalk and city of Glendale.

=== Other sections ===
San Fernando Valley

In the San Fernando Valley there are several other non-connected sections. A new section is under construction in Reseda to continue it eastward.

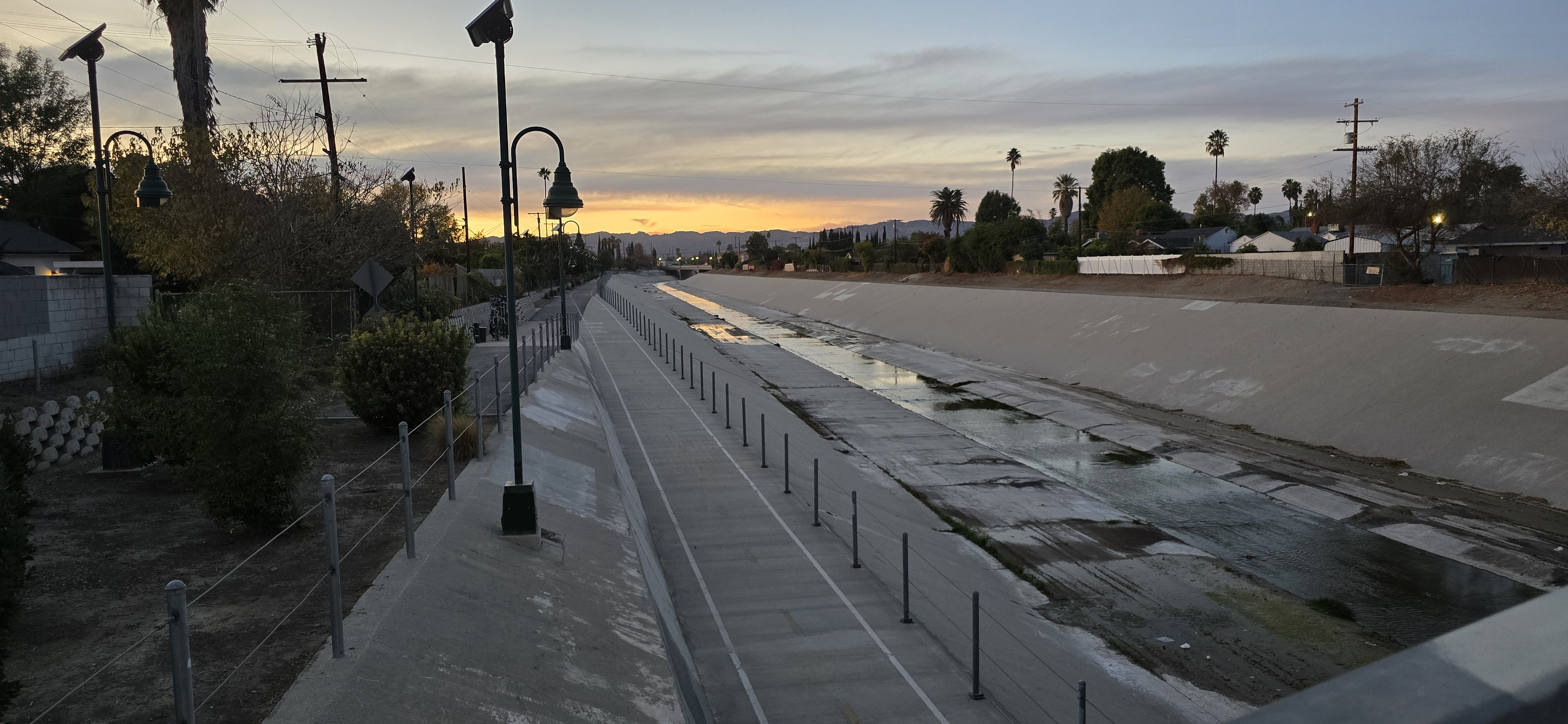
The Los Angeles River Bike Path travels underneath the bridge for Winnetka Avenue, north of Pierce College.

A 1.5 mile stretch in Canoga Park from Mason to Owensmouth opened in April 2022, and “the next section of the bike path being planned will go from Vanalden Avenue to Balboa Boulevard in the Sepulveda Basin.”

A half-mile section in “Studio City between Whitsett Avenue and Coldwater Canyon Avenue” opened in 2019.

Further east the North Valleyheart Riverwalk is located in Studio City.

== Tributaries ==
Arroyo Seco

The Arroyo Seco Bicycle Path and Kenneth Newell Bikeway are in the Arroyo Seco river channel, upstream from its confluence with the Los Angeles River. It runs from Montecito Heights northeast to Pasadena.

Browns Creek

The Browns Creek Bike Trail runs along Browns Canyon Wash in Chatsworth, at the foot of the Santa Susana Mountains in the northwestern San Fernando Valley.

Compton Creek

The Compton Creek Bike Path is in Compton, along the east bank of two sections of Compton Creek, a tributary of the lower Los Angeles River. The northern section of the path is a paved trail extending from El Segundo Boulevard south through residential neighborhoods to Greenleaf Boulevard. An equestrian trail runs along the west bank of the creek.

A shorter section of paved trail exists farther south along the creek, but it is separated by the LA Metro A Line tracks, the Gardena Freeway, and the east fork of Compton Creek. Access to this southern segment is only at a few large streets, and it ends at Del Amo Boulevard north of the confluence of Compton Creek and the Los Angeles River.

Dominguez Channel

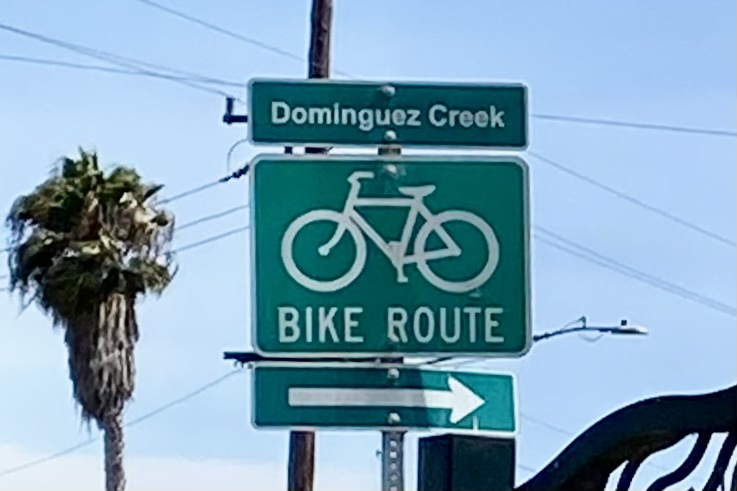
Dominguez Creek Bike Route sign

The Dominguez Channel Bicycle Path/Laguna Dominguez Bicycle Trail is along a 2.8 miles (4.5 km) section of the Upper Dominguez Channel, a 15.7 miles (25.3 km) long channelized stream west of the lower Los Angeles River in southern Los Angeles County. It runs between the community of Alondra Park near El Camino College and Hawthorne near the Hawthorne Airport. It is a project of the city of Hawthorne's Dominguez Enhancement and Engagement Project (D.E.E.P) It has numerous mid-block crossings with cross walk navigation, and offers good pedestrian access. Periodic mile markers painted on the pavement indicating distances upstream from its mouth at the Port of Los Angeles.

== Future development ==
On July 23, 2013, the nonprofit group River LA, formerly known as Los Angeles River Revitalization Corp, announced a goal of completing a continuous 51-mile greenway and bike path along the river by the end of the decade. The path is envisioned to be the central focus of a linear recreational park as well as providing an alternative transportation path through Los Angeles. The announcement by the nonprofit group precedes the expected August 30 release of a feasibility study being prepared by the U.S. Army Corps of Engineers. The Corps have the ultimate decision-making power over the river and its future revitalization.

== See also ==
- List of Los Angeles bike paths
- CicLAvia
