= Arroyo Seco bicycle path =

Cycling route in California, USA

Coordinates: 34.0965°N 118.1903°W

Arroyo Seco Bicycle Path
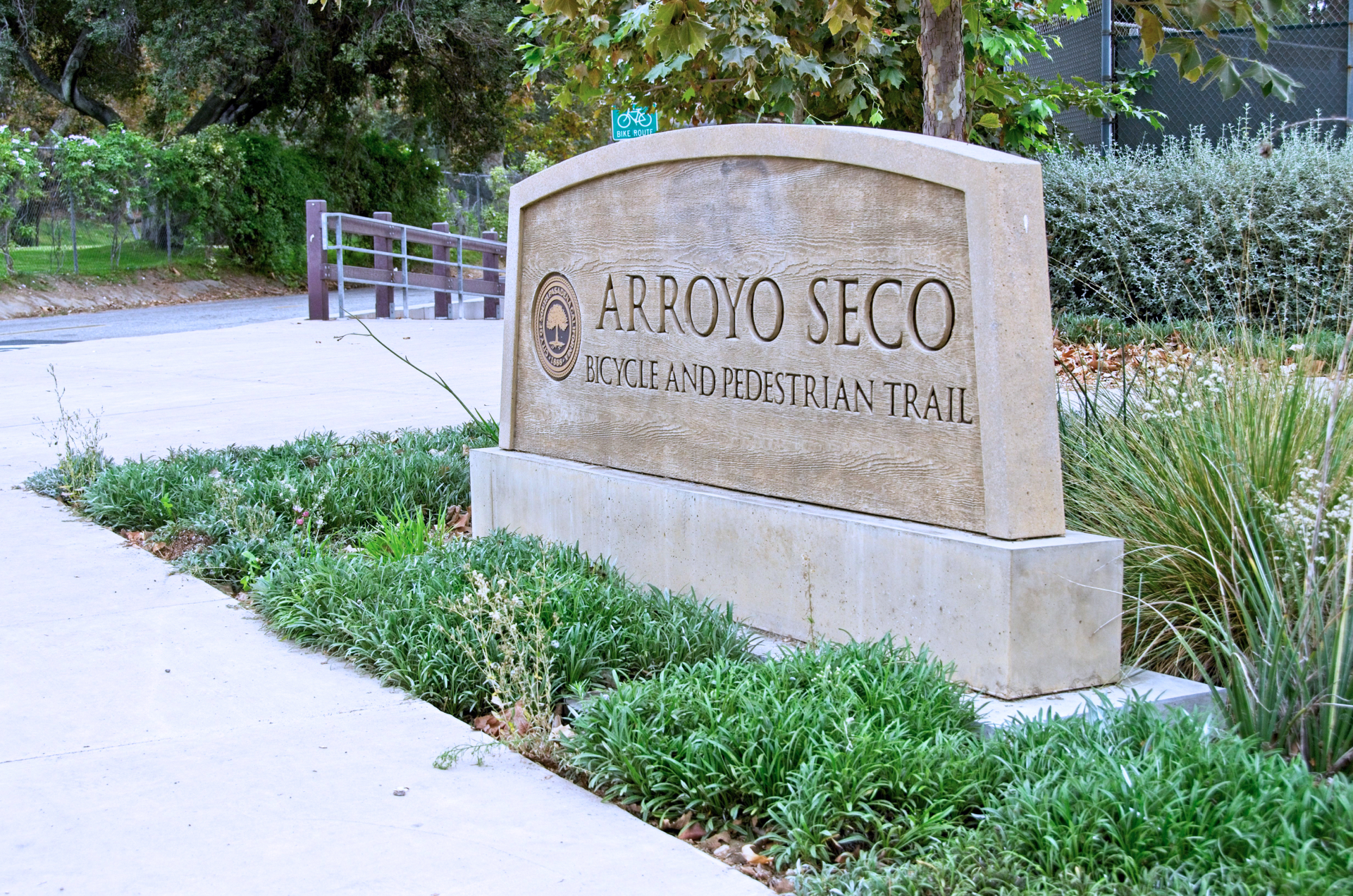
- Length: 2 mi (3.2 km)
- Location: Northeast Los Angeles
- Use: Active transportation, road biking, walking, dogs on leash
- Difficulty: Easy
- Surface: asphalt

The Arroyo Seco Bicycle Path is an approximately 2-mile (3.2 km) long Class I bicycle path along the Arroyo Seco river channel and canyon in the Northeast Los Angeles region of Los Angeles County, California. It parallels the Arroyo Seco Parkway (CA Route 110), which is also a part of the canyon.

== Description ==
The bicycle path connects: Montecito Heights at Ernest E. Debs Regional Park and the Montecito Heights Recreation Center; Hermon at Hermon Park and Ernest E. Debs Regional Park; and Highland Park at Sycamore Grove Park -- to the city of South Pasadena at the Arroyo Seco Stables. The pathway travels under the cover of tall California sycamore and California oak trees.

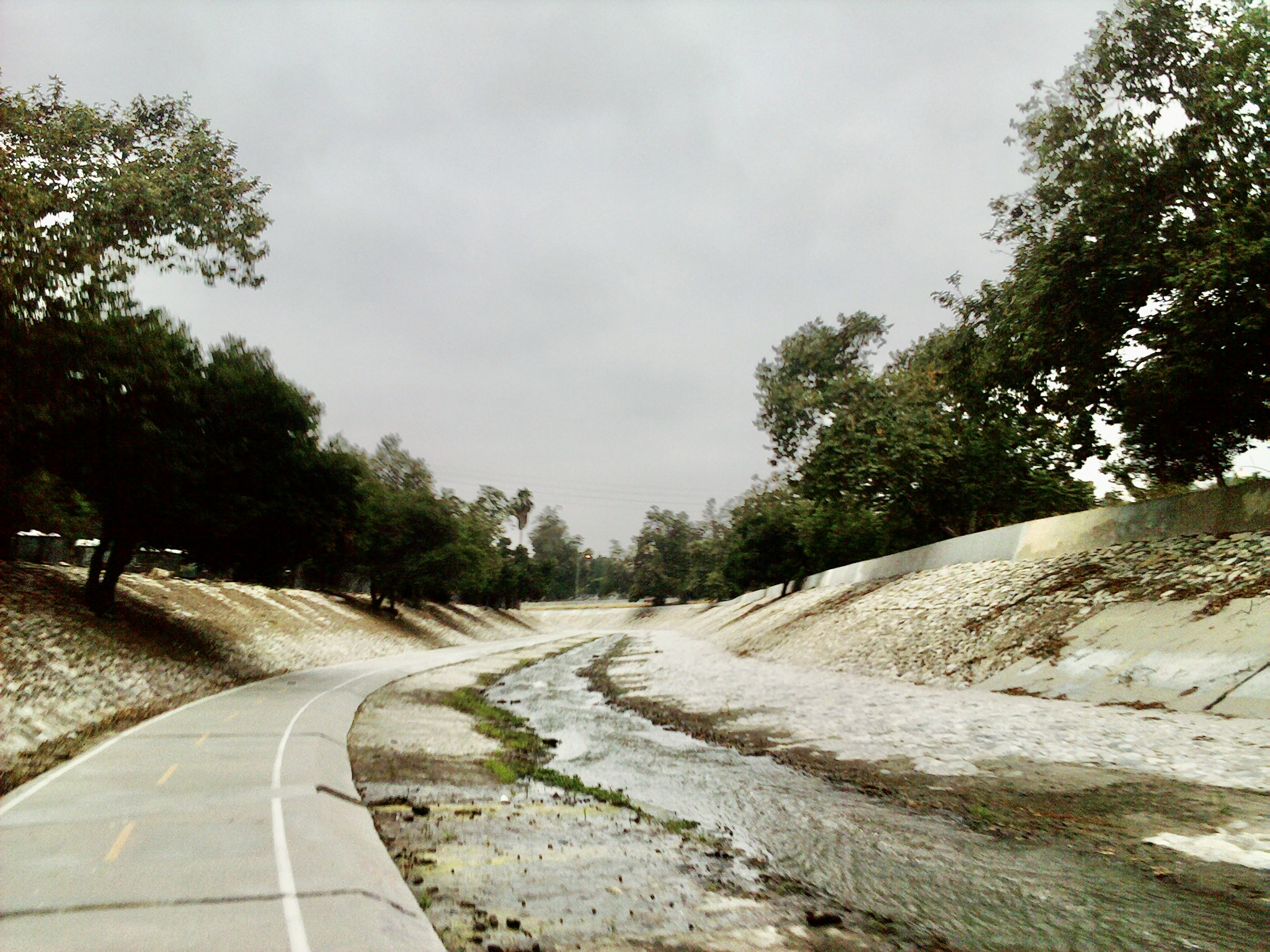
Bicycle path in the Arroyo Seco channel.

The southwest portion of the path, approximately 0.25 miles (0.40 km), runs along the top of the channel and overlooks the Arroyo Seco through chain-link fencing. It then descends into the bed of Arroyo Seco flood control channel for the rest of the route. Following the channel hydraulics, there is a slight and consistent uphill grade in the northeast/upstream direction, with some sections under overpasses having slightly greater slopes.

Parking and access are located at Hermon Park/Arroyo Seco Park, Sycamore Grove Park, Ernest E. Debs Regional Park, and the Montecito Heights Recreation Center. The Sycamore Grove Park access is via a pedestrian bridge over the Arroyo Seco. The path crosses several other pedestrian and vehicular bridges along its route.

Closures

For flood safety reasons, if rain is predicted or if water release is expected from the upstream dam, public access is not permitted in the channel.

=== Connectivity ===
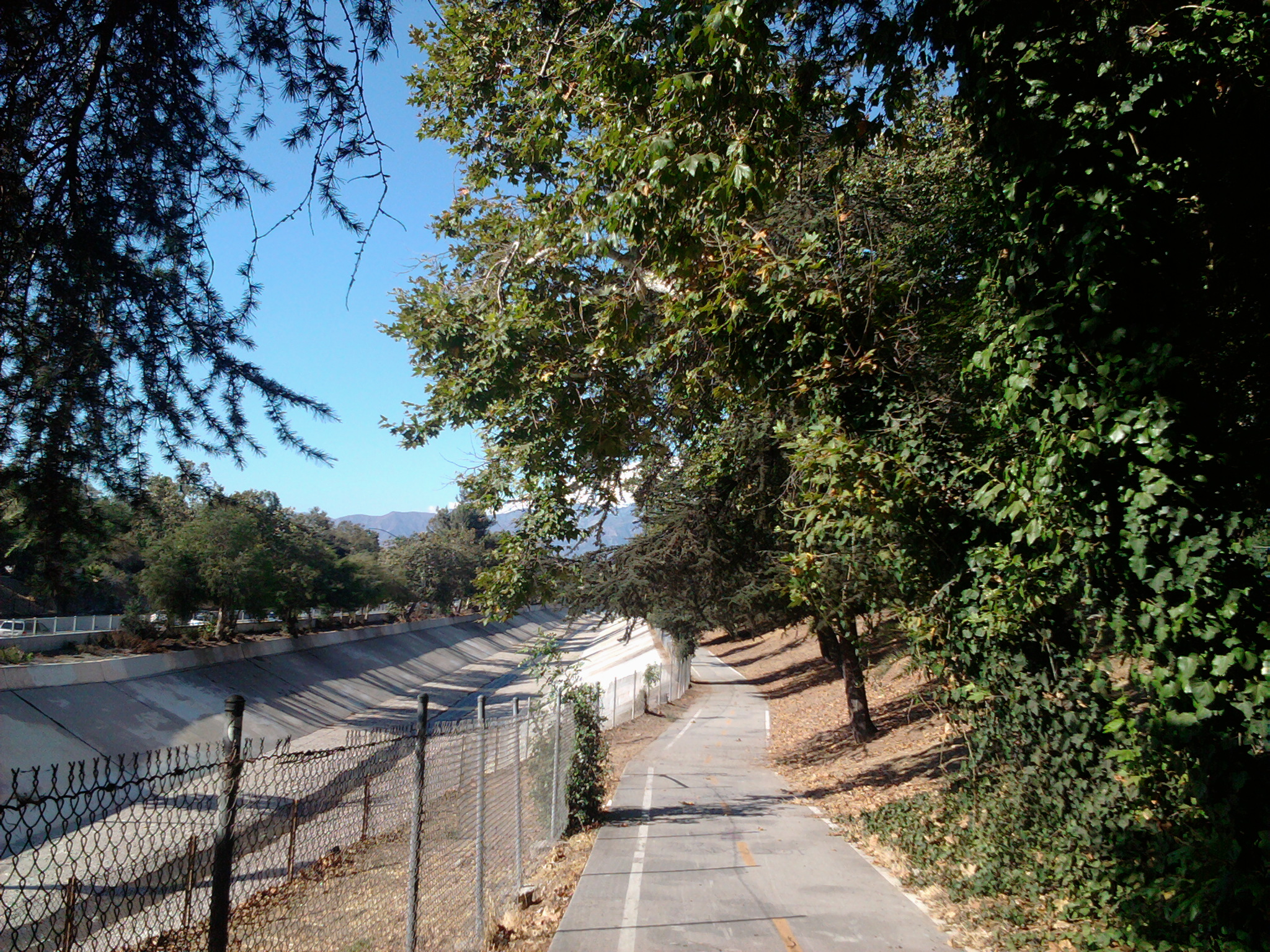
Path in Montecito Heights

The path continues as a walking and equestrian trail from its northern terminus, with only pedestrians and horses allowed beyond the Arroyo Seco Stables. However, bicyclists can continue on the Kenneth Newell Bikeway along Arroyo Boulevard just to the east, a quiet residential street that continues north in the Arroyo Seco to the Rose Bowl Stadium in Pasadena.

From the path's southern terminus, the open air Heritage Square Museum and the Lummis House and gardens are nearby. Connections southwards to the Los Angeles River Bicycle Path several miles away are via the vehicle shared Figuroa Street to Riverside Drive.

== Maintenance ==
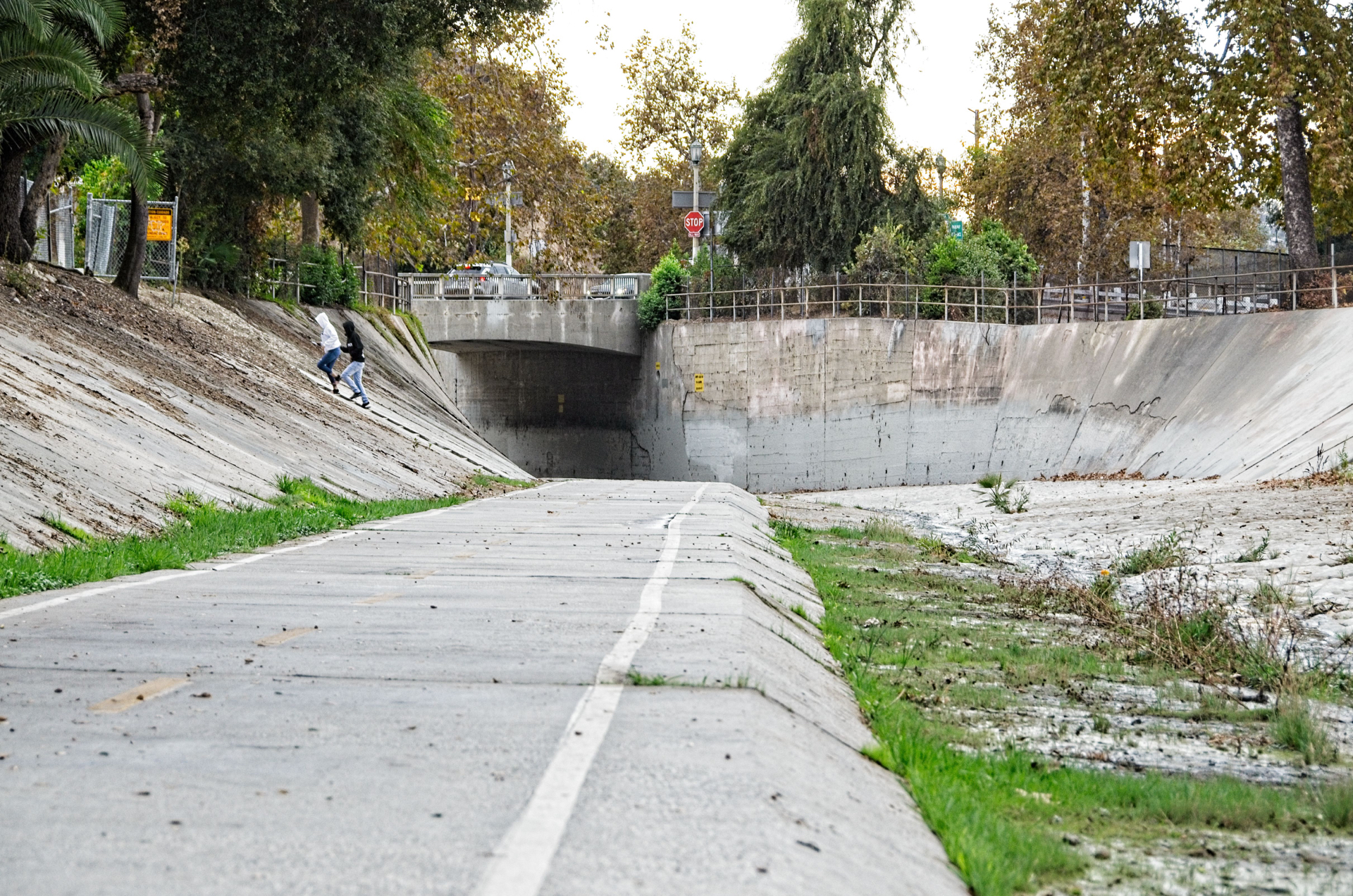
Bike path near Via Marisol bridge

The Arroyo Seco Bicycle Path is maintained by the City of Los Angeles. The Arroyo Seco river channel that the bike path is located in is maintained by the Los Angeles County Department of Public Works.

=== Hazards ===
Especially after rain events, storm-borne debris accumulates on the path and poses a danger to cyclists and pedestrians. Other hazards include trash and debris such as beverage bottles, shopping carts, and electronics that are being illegally discarded into the channel from bridge overpasses. Due to periodical maintenance activities, the path is usually clear from any debris and provides an enjoyable recreational area.

== See also ==
- Kenneth Newell Bikeway
- List of Los Angeles bike paths
- CicLAvia
- Bike paths in Los Angeles
- Parks in Los Angeles County, California
