= Arroyo Seco Bridge =

Arroyo Seco Bridge may refer to the following bridges over the Arroyo Seco in California, USA:

- The Washington Boulevard Bridge
- The Seco Street Bridge
- The Colorado Street Bridge (Pasadena, California), a concrete arch road bridge built in Pasadena in 1913 to carry Colorado Boulevard over the Arroyo
- The Pioneers Bridge, another concrete arch road bridge built immediately north of the Colorado Street Bridge in the 1950s to carry State Route 134 over the Arroyo
- The La Loma Bridge which carries La Loma Road over the Arroyo
- The Santa Fe Arroyo Seco Railroad Bridge
- The California State Route 110 Bridge
- The York Boulevard Bridge which on the east end becomes Pasadena Avenue; built in 1912
- The Interstate 5 Bridge
- The San Fernando Road Bridge
- The Avenue 19 Bridge, the last bridge before the Arroyo Seco flows into the Los Angeles River
