= Ernest E. Debs Regional Park =

Nature reserve and regional park in Montecito Hills, Los Angeles, California

Coordinates: 34.0960°N 118.1937°W

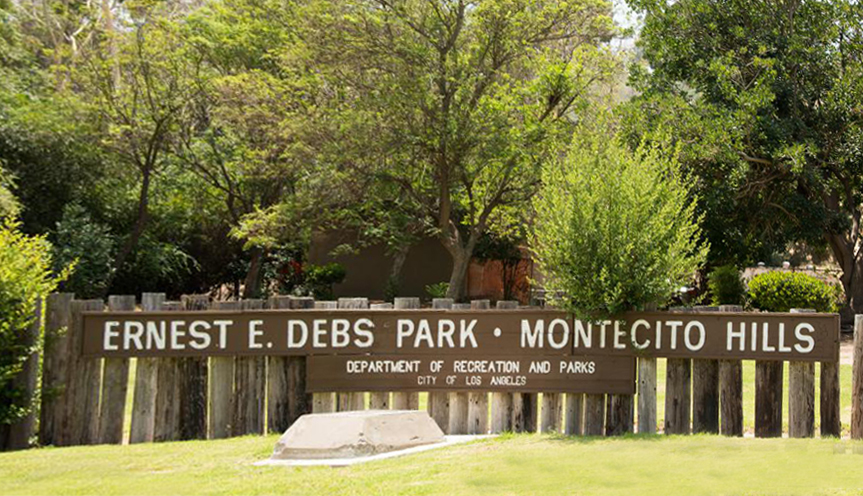
Park signage

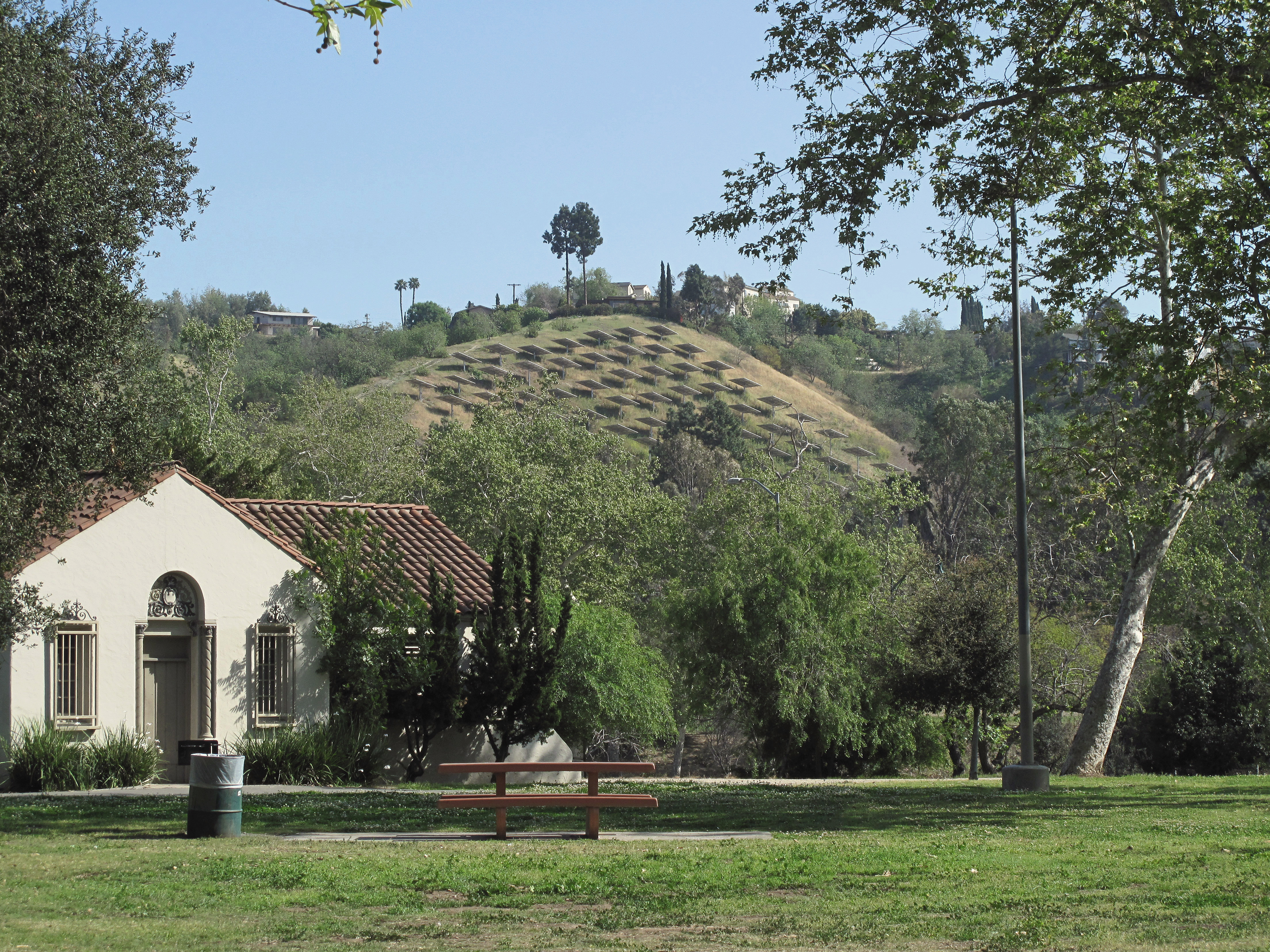
View from Sycamore Grove Park to the hillside solar panels and Ernest E. Debs Regional Park in Montecito Hills

Ernest E. Debs Regional Park is a large open space nature reserve and regional park in the Montecito Hills neighborhood of central-northeast Los Angeles, California.

It is named after former County Supervisor Ernest E. Debs. The park is operated by the City of Los Angeles Department of Recreation and Parks.

== Geography ==
Ernest E. Debs Regional Park is located in Montecito Hills, with views of the Arroyo Seco, San Gabriel Mountains, and Downtown Los Angeles. The park provides several miles of hiking and cycling trails. Access is from Griffin Avenue at Avenue 43, and off Monterey Road.

== History ==
Between 1949 and 1963, the City of Los Angeles acquired property for Rose Hill Park, which remained open space and undeveloped. In 1968, the city leased the land to the County of Los Angeles for twenty-five years, with an agreement that the area would be developed into a regional park. When the land was returned to the city in 1994, the County had invested $900,000 into park improvements and had renamed it after Ernest E. Debs, a deceased county supervisor).

On October 27, 2015, Gabriela Calzada and Briana Gallegos were murdered in Debs Park.

On September 10, 2021, Jason Cortez was shot and killed in Debs Park.

== Ecology ==
The park contains 282 acres (1.14 km^{2}) of native California walnut (Juglans californica) and California oak woodlands (Interior live oak (Quercus wislizeni) habitats.

Ernest E. Debs Regional Park contains the Audubon Center at Debs Park. The Audubon Center building was the first carbon-neutral building constructed in the United States. The center provides nature education programs (all ages) and native plant restoration projects.

== See also ==
- List of California native plants
