= Bellefontaine/Governor Markham, Pasadena, California =

Neighborhood in Pasadena, California, immediately south of Downtown

Coordinates: 34.1316°N 118.1575°W

Bellefontaine is a neighborhood in Pasadena, California, immediately south of Downtown. The neighborhood is bordered by Del Mar Boulevard to the north, Columbia Street to the south, the Lower Arroyo Seco (Los Angeles County) to the west, and Fair Oaks Avenue to the east. The main roads through the neighborhood are California Boulevard and Pasadena Avenue.

A small part of the neighborhood on Markham Street is referred to as the Governor Markham Landmark District, as the neighborhood was once home to California Governor Henry Markham. The Markham Place historic district was added to the National Register of Historic Places in 2013.

The word Bellefontaine is French for "beautiful fountain." The actual namesake fountain is a terraced slate stone fountain & gardens located at the M.H. Reed residence (built 1911) located at 450 Bellefontaine Street by architect Joseph Blick.

== Landmarks ==
Bellefontaine is home to Huntington Memorial Hospital, currently Pasadena's only hospital. In the center of the neighborhood is Singer Park. The Pasadena Heritage society is headquartered in the 1893 Madison house next to Singer Park.

== Education ==
Bellefontaine is served by both San Rafael and McKinley elementary schools, and Blair High School for both middle school and high school. Mayfield Senior School, Waverly School and Westridge School are private schools in the neighborhood.

== Transportation ==
A tiny, 300-foot stretch of the Metro A Line runs through the neighborhood's southeastern corner. The nearest station is on Fillmore Street, one block from the neighborhood's edge.

Bellefontaine is served by Metro Local line 260. Pasadena Transit routes 20, 51 and 52 also serve the neighborhood.

The neighborhood is partially bisected by a small portion of the incomplete Interstate 710. To prevent further destruction to the neighborhood, plans are underway to construct the remainder of the freeway underground.
