= Arroyo Seco (Los Angeles County) =

Seasonal watercourse and human settlement in US

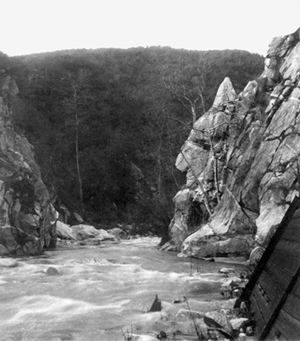
- The Devil's Gate at the Arroyo Seco River before its 1920 damming. Note the "devil's profile" in the rock to the right.

- Location of the mouth of Arroyo Seco in California

Location
- Country: United States
- State: California

Physical characteristics
- Source: San Gabriel Mountains
  - location: near Red Box Gap, Angeles National Forest
  - coordinates: 34°16′10″N 118°06′19″W
  - elevation: 5,200 ft (1,600 m)
- Mouth: Los Angeles River
  - location: Glendale Narrows, near Lincoln Heights, United States of America
  - coordinates: 34°04′44″N 118°13′33″W
  - elevation: 302 ft (92 m)
- Length: 24.9 mi (40.1 km)
- Basin size: 46.7 sq mi (121 km^{2})
- Discharge
  - location: near Pasadena
  - average: 10.1 cu ft/s (0.29 m^{3}/s)
  - minimum: 0 cu ft/s (0 m^{3}/s)
  - maximum: 8,620 cu ft/s (244 m^{3}/s)

Basin features
- Tributaries
  - left: Bear Creek, Los Angeles, Millard Creek, Los Angeles

The Arroyo Seco, meaning "dry stream" in Spanish, is a 24.9-mile-long (40.1 km) seasonal river, canyon, watershed, and cultural area in Los Angeles County, California. The area was explored by Gaspar de Portolà, who named the stream Arroyo Seco because its canyon had the least water of any he had seen. During this exploration, he met Chief Hahamog-na (Hahamongna) of the Tongva Indians.

== Waterway course ==
The watershed begins at Red Box Saddle in the Angeles National Forest near Mount Wilson in the San Gabriel Mountains. As it enters the urbanized area of the watershed, the Arroyo Seco stream flows between La Cañada Flintridge on the west and Altadena on the east. Just below Devil's Gate Dam, the stream passes underneath the Foothill Freeway. At the north end of Brookside Golf Course, the stream has been constrained into a flood control channel and proceeds southward through the golf course. For a very short stretch below the golf course, however, the streambed remains natural.

Arroyo Seco goes through Pasadena alongside the San Rafael Hills to its west, where it passes the Rose Bowl Stadium as it goes through Brookside Park. The Arroyo Seco stream, which is fed by a watershed of 46.7 square miles (121.0 km^{2}), helps to replenish the Raymond Basin, an aquifer underlying Pasadena that provides about half of the local water supply. This arroyo is one of two major streams that capture rainfall and storm water in Pasadena, the other being Eaton Wash on the eastern side of the city, which is a tributary of the Rio Hondo watershed.

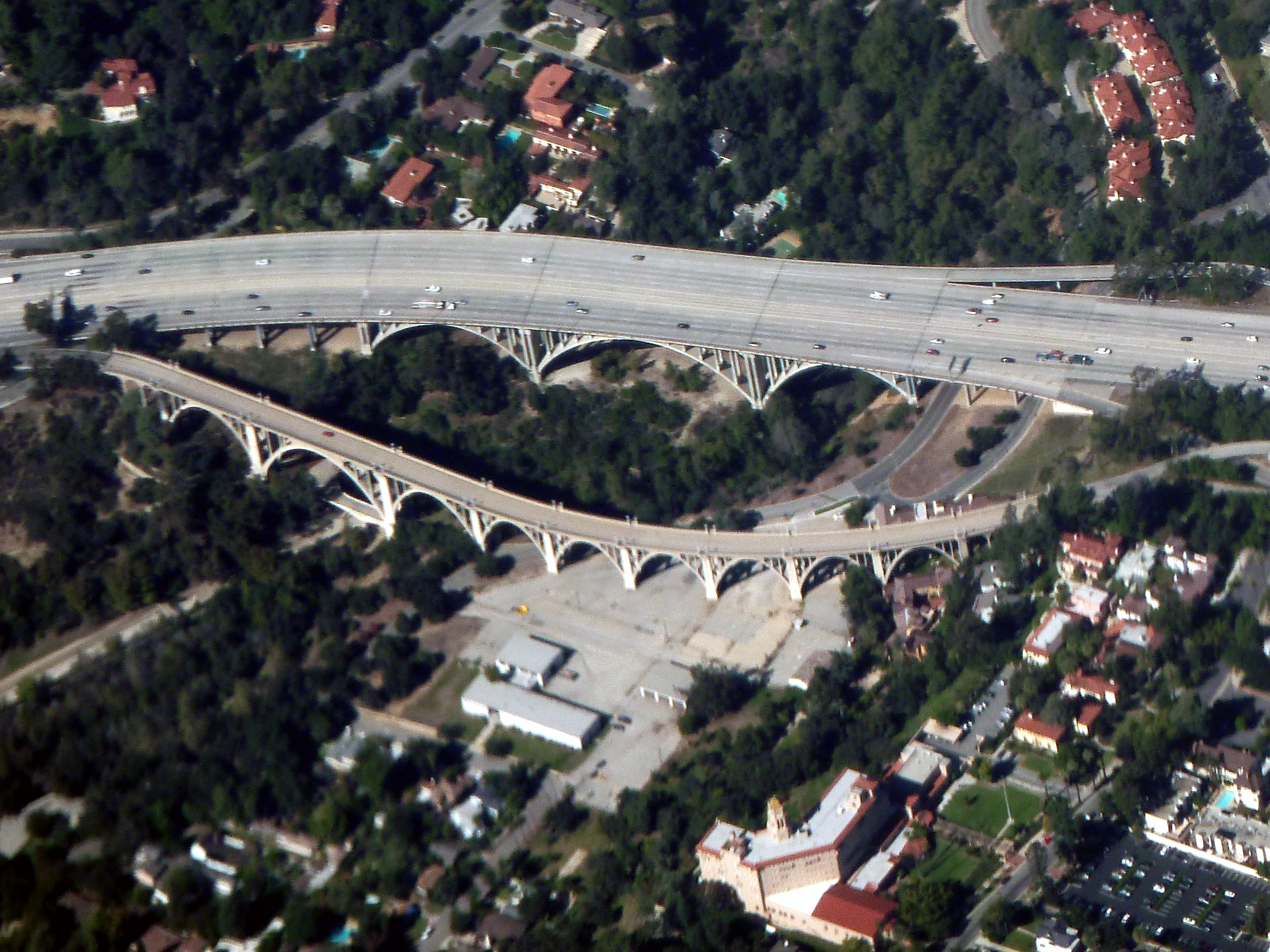
Colorado Street Bridge and the bridge for the Ventura Freeway

The Arroyo Seco passes under the Ventura Freeway and the Colorado Street Bridge. It crosses the Raymond Fault at the southern boundary of Pasadena, and begins crossing through the Repetto Hills. The channel continues along the western boundary of South Pasadena, then runs into northeast Los Angeles and flows southeast of Mount Washington. The Arroyo Seco then proceeds through the Los Angeles neighborhoods of Highland Park, Hermon, Montecito Heights, and Cypress Park. It ends at the confluence with the Los Angeles River near Elysian Park, north of Dodger Stadium and Downtown Los Angeles.

The Arroyo Seco Parkway, or Pasadena Freeway, runs parallel to the channelized Arroyo Seco from South Pasadena to the Los Angeles River.

== History ==
=== Traditional narrative ===
Above Devil's Gate, the rapids of the Arroyo Seco are positioned so that the falls make a beating, laughing sound. In Tongva-Gabrieliño traditional narratives, this is attributed to a wager made between the river and the coyote spirit.

=== Early settlement ===
The Arroyo Seco was one of the Los Angeles River tributaries explored by Gaspar de Portola in the late summer and fall of 1770. He named the stream Arroyo Seco, for of all the canyons he had seen, this one had the least water. During this exploration he met the Chief Hahamog-na (Hahamonga) near Millard Canyon, at the settlement later known as Hahamongna, California. This band of the Tongva Indians would end up gathered into the fold of the San Gabriel Mission and with other bands and tribes collectively called "Gabrielenos".

The Arroyo Seco region can be considered by historical accounts as the birthplace of Pasadena. After the 1820s secularization of the Missions, the broad area to the east of the Arroyo was the Mexican land grant of Rancho San Pascual, present-day Pasadena, California. Manuel Garfias was the grantee of the Rancho and its longest early resident. His adobe house was on the east ridge of the Arroyo, in present-day South Pasadena.

With the 1874 establishment of the community of the Indiana Colony, the new residents built their homes along today's Orange Grove Boulevard, the major north–south avenue paralleling the Arroyo on the east. However, the deep and seasonally flooded Arroyo presented a barrier to easy travel and transportation between renamed Pasadena and Los Angeles. Stories of four and five hours just crossing the chasm, whether exaggerated or not, abounded in Pasadena history.

The first recorded American to live in the Upper Arroyo (north of Devil's Gate) was simply known as "Old Man Brunk". Brunk's cabin stood at a large bend in the canyon, roughly where the Forest Service housing is today. It was said he left San Francisco "for that town's good".

=== Transportation corridor ===
Dating back to the original Tongva residents of the area, the Arroyo Seco canyon has always served as a major transportation corridor. Today it links downtown Los Angeles with Pasadena, the west San Gabriel Valley and the San Gabriel Mountains.

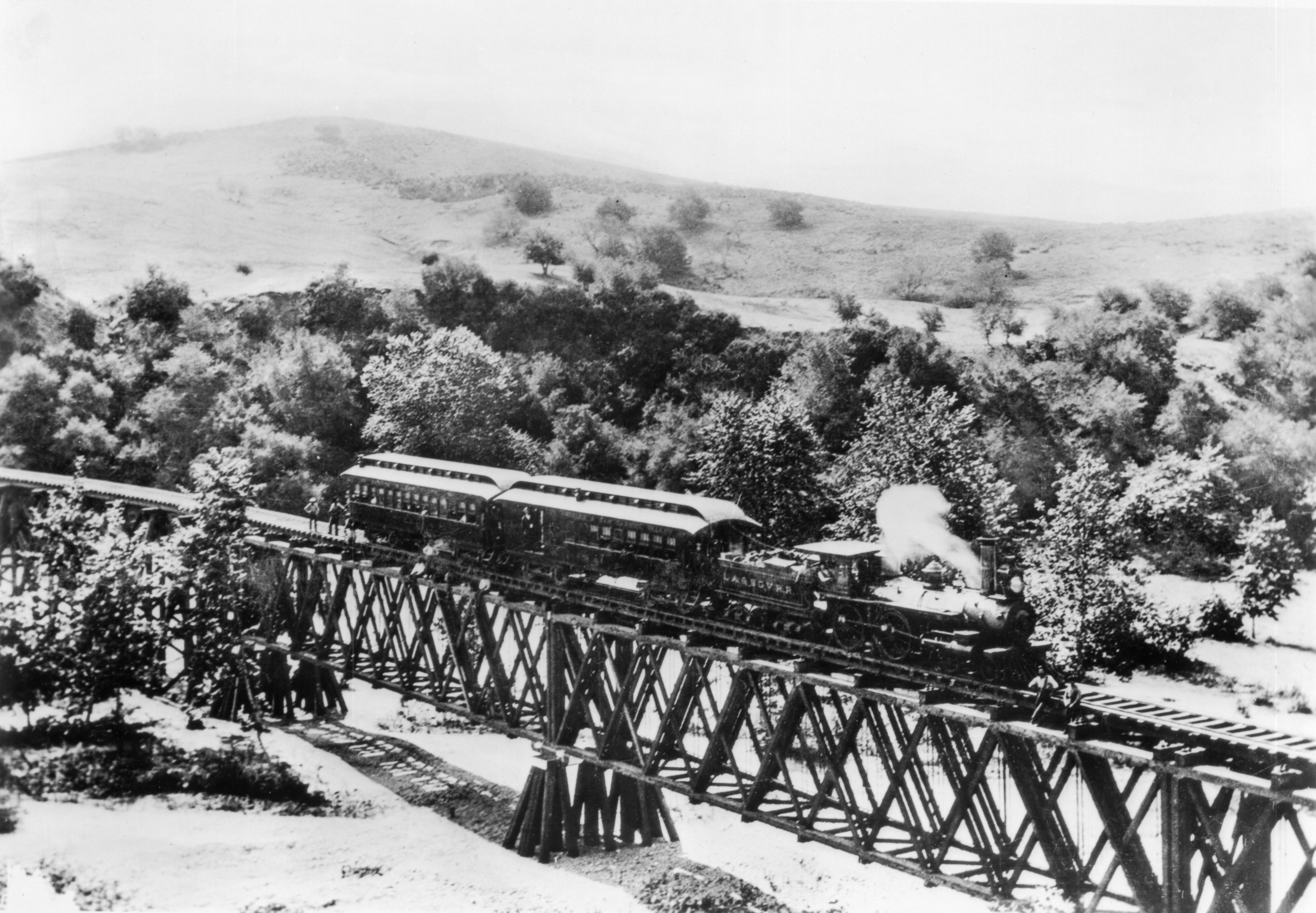
1886 view of the Los Angeles and San Gabriel Railroad crossing the Arroyo Seco near Garvanza - Highland Park

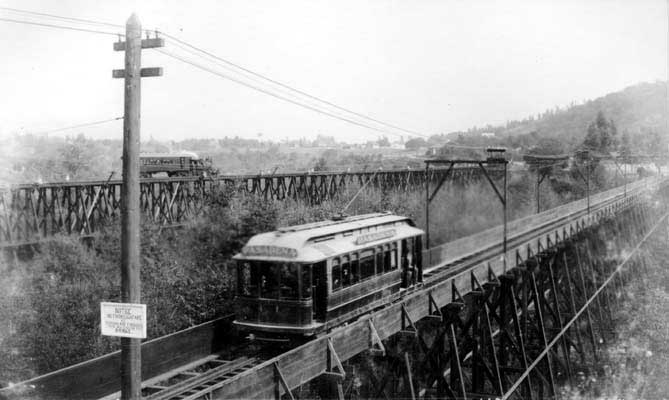
Pasadena and Los Angeles Electric Railway and Los Angeles and San Gabriel Valley Railroad train in the Arroyo Seco

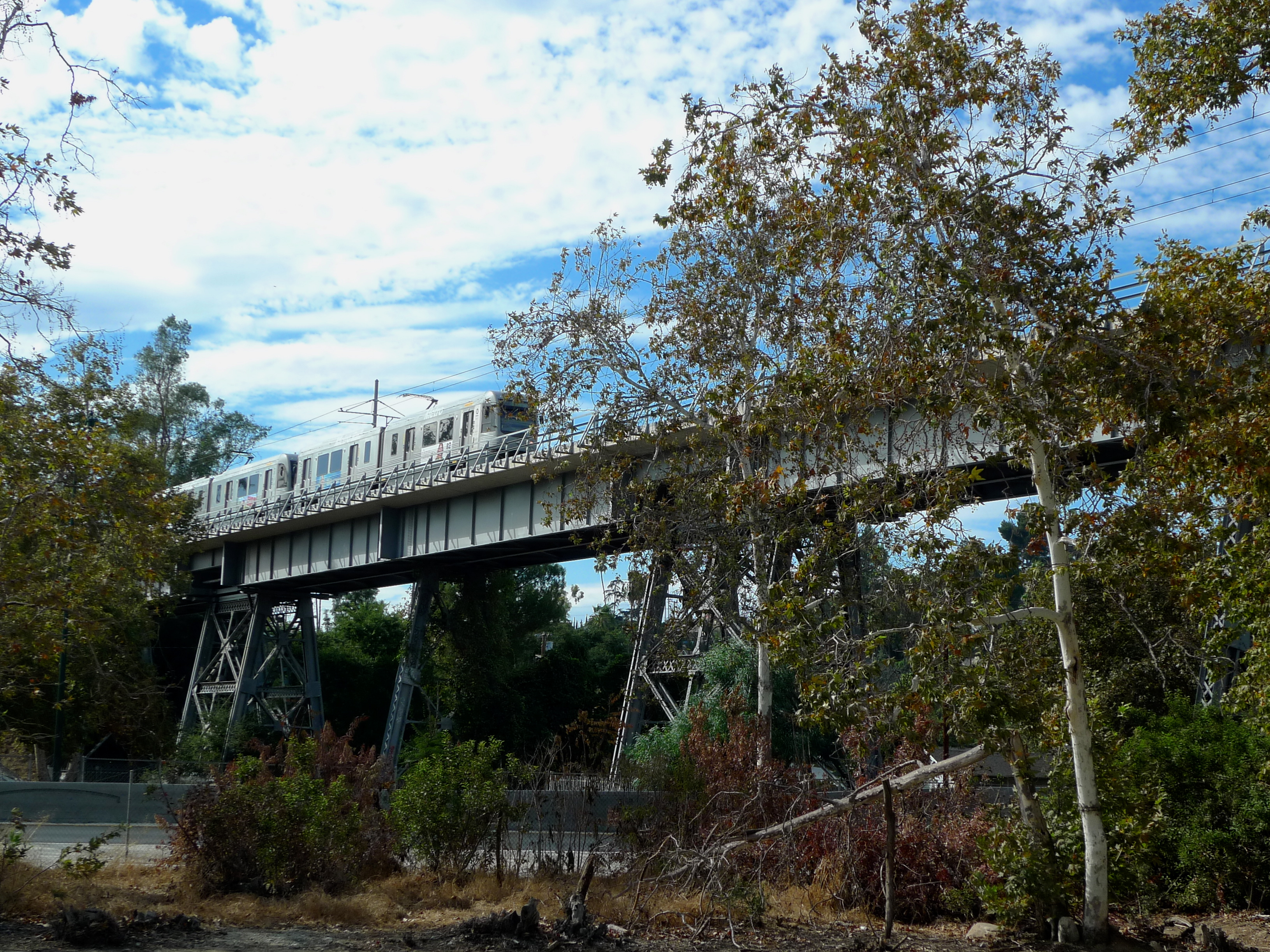
Santa Fe Arroyo Seco Railroad Bridge with a Gold line Tram crossing

By 1886 the Los Angeles and San Gabriel Valley Railroad had been established from Downtown Los Angeles with a grand wooden trestle that cut a straight line crossing from the west side to the east. The wooden trestle was replaced with the Santa Fe Arroyo Seco Railroad Bridge. Eventually this line would hook up with rail lines built from the east to create the cross-country course of the Santa Fe Railroad. For local commutes, an electric traction trolley was put in and operated by the Pacific Electric Railway, a Henry E. Huntington enterprise, which ran the "Red Cars" from the upper Arroyo and Pasadena through the San Gabriel Valley into Los Angeles and many points beyond. The lower Arroyo Seco was served by the Los Angeles Railway "Yellow Car" lines.

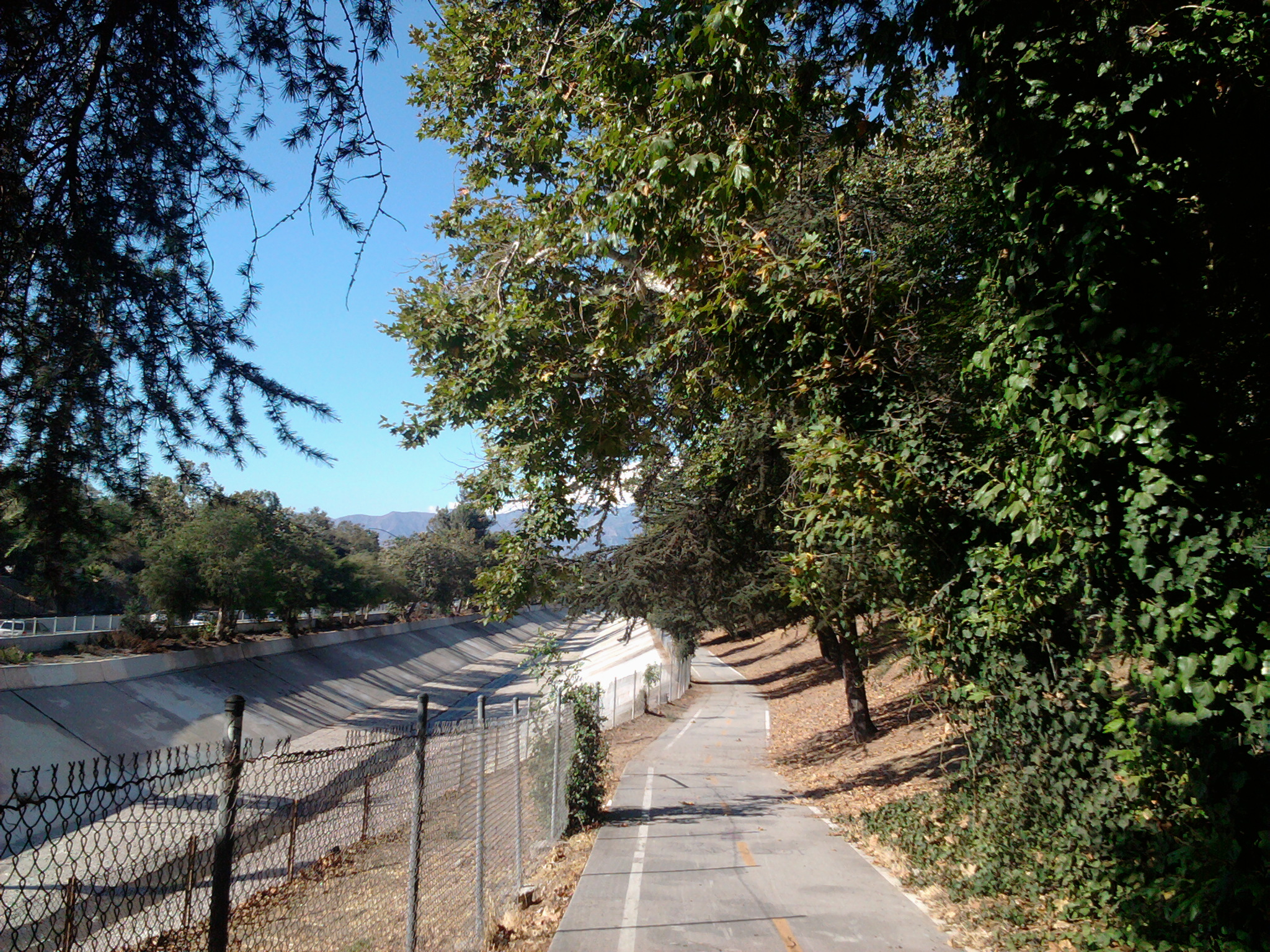
Arroyo Seco bicycle path

In 1900 Horace Dobbins, Mayor of Pasadena, opened his innovative California Cycleway, an elevated wood structure with a flat planked surface that would allow bicyclers to travel from Pasadena to Los Angeles avoiding the uncertain schedules of the early trains. Dobbins was only able to build a two-mile portion of the cycleway from the Green Hotel to Raymond Hill before competition from the railroads and the growing popularity of the horseless carriage undermined the project. Present day cycling activists are reviving a vision and plan for a dedicated bikeway from Pasadena to Los Angeles. The Arroyo Seco bicycle path now runs from Highland Park to South Pasadena; the Kenneth Newell Bikeway continues the route through Pasadena.

In 1913 the Colorado Street Bridge was dedicated. This structure curves across the Arroyo accessing Eagle Rock, Glendale, and the San Fernando Valley. During the Stock Market Crash of 1929 and the subsequent Great Depression of the 1930s, the bridge was a jumping off point for many committing suicide, whereby it received the ignoble name of "Suicide bridge." By the 1980s the bridge fell into disrepair as chunks of concrete dropped from its face to the armory parking lot in the Arroyo below. In October 1989, the Colorado Street Bridge was closed as a precautionary measure in the aftermath of the San Francisco–Oakland Bay Bridge failure in the Loma Prieta earthquake. Eventually assistance from the Federal Bridge Repair and Replacement Fund and other local governmental agency discretionary funds provided funding for the complete restoration and seismic retrofit of the bridge. The total project budget amounted to $24 million, and the Colorado Street Bridge was reopened on December 13, 1993, on time and on budget.

==== Arroyo Seco Parkway ====
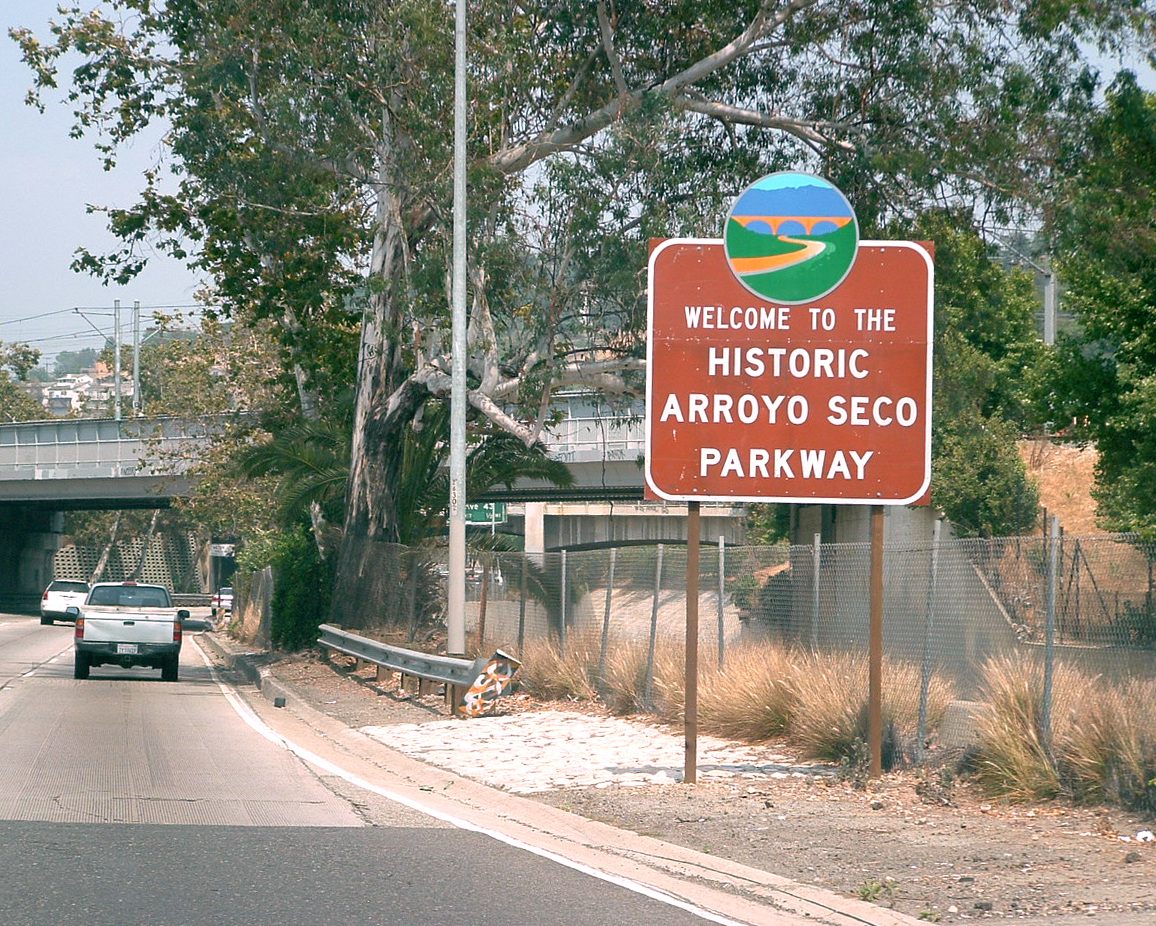
Arroyo Seco Parkway

By mid-20th Century, the automobile had long become a mainstay of Southern California life. In 1940 the Arroyo Seco Parkway, the first freeway, was built as a parkway alongside the newly constructed flood channel in the Los Angeles portion of the Arroyo. Today, also known as the Pasadena Freeway, it continues on through downtown becoming the Harbor Freeway, and terminates near the harbor in San Pedro.

The Arroyo Seco Corridor Management Plan was completed for the "Arroyo Seco Parkway" in 2004. The Plan was created through a partnership with the National Trust for Historic Preservation, the National Scenic Byways Center (Federal Highways), Caltrans (State Highways), the National Park Service, the Santa Monica Mountains Conservancy, and The Center for Preservation Education and Planning (CPEP Inc.).

The Arroyo Seco Flood Control Channel, was built by the Works Progress Administration before and during construction of the parkway to avoid damages from future floods.

== Floods and controls ==
The Arroyo Seco generally has a flow of several cubic feet per second, but periodically it is inundated by torrential floods from its steep, erosion-prone mountain watershed. The reputation of Arroyo Seco floods led the Spanish to site the original Pueblo de Los Ángeles away from the confluence of the Arroyo Seco and the Los Angeles River. Historically, these floods would race down the stream bed and overflow through Pasadena, South Pasadena, Alhambra and Los Angeles communities all the way to the Los Angeles River. As Los Angeles developed into a city and grew outwards, the damage from these floods was particularly severe in 1914 and 1916.

=== Devil's Gate Dam ===
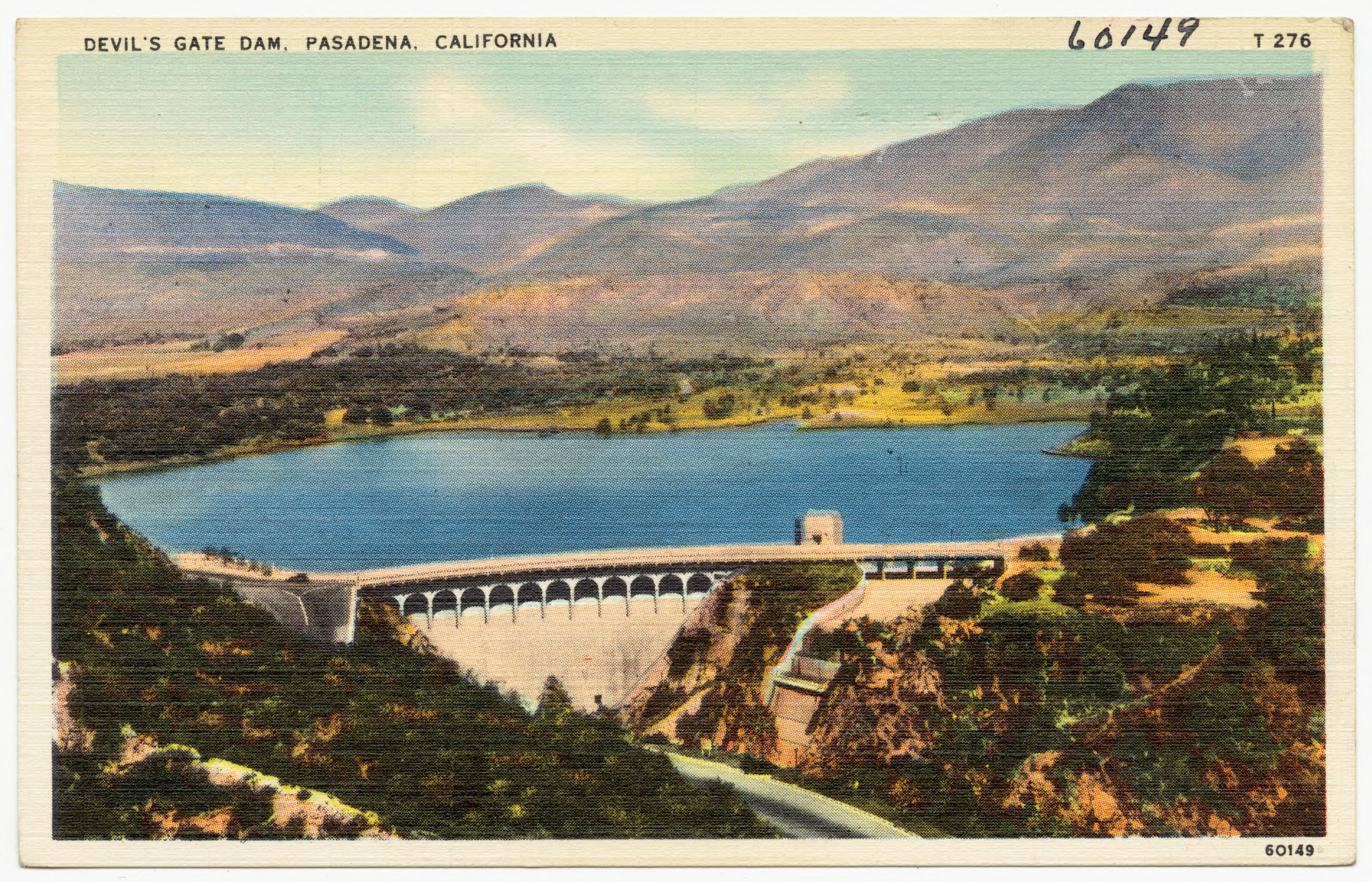
Postcard of the dam, circa 1935 to 1950

In 1920 (106 years ago), the Los Angeles County Flood Control District built the first flood control dam in Los Angeles County at Devil's Gate gorge. Named for a rock outcropping which resembles the face of a devil, this is the narrowest spot on the Arroyo Seco's course below Millard Canyon. The construction was by the Bent Brothers Company. Devil's Gate Dam in the Arroyo Seco in northern Pasadena between La Cañada Flintridge and Altadena is managed by the Los Angeles County Department of Public Works.

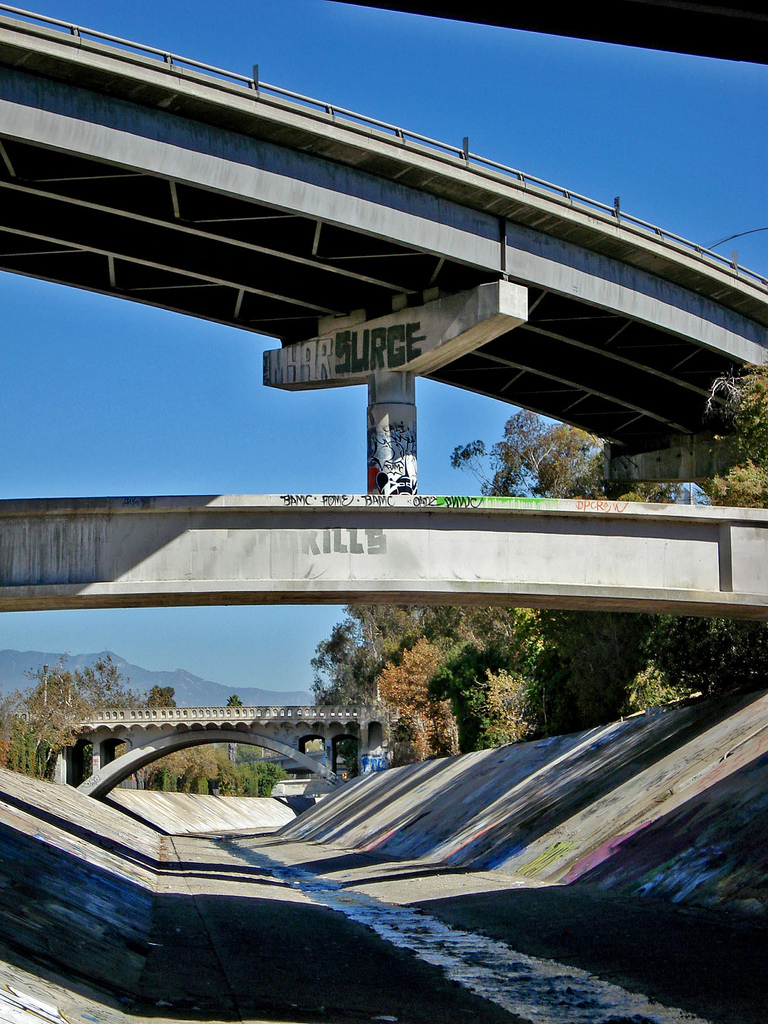
Channelized lower creek section of the Arroyo Seco

The flood basin above the dam captures the flows of the mountain watershed of the Arroyo Seco. This area is now called "Hahamongna", a phrase meaning "Flowing Waters, Fruitful Valley" in the language of the Tongva tribe who first inhabited the area. In 2011, the flood basin had filled with debris brought down after the 2009 Station Fire, reducing its effectiveness as a flood control measure. The County of Los Angeles conducted public hearings on the Environmental impact statement before selecting a method to remove debris from the Hahamongna area. In 2014, the Board of Supervisors approved a five-year project to remove 2.4 million cubic yards of sediment (1,800,000 m^{3}) from the basin despite strong opposition from neighbors and recreational enthusiasts. The opponents contended that hundreds of trucks would be required that would increase pollution and noise. They also said that the wildlife habitat would be destroyed and interfere with hikers, cyclists and horseback riders who use the area for recreation. The alternative supported by Pasadena officials would have removed 1.4 million cubic yards of sediment (1,100,000 m^{3}) and provided regular maintenance. County officials supported removing more sediment to reduce the flood risk for most major storms, the work having begun in early-2019.

Below Devil's Gate Dam, most of the Arroyo Seco creek, with two short exceptions, is contained in a concrete channel that contains stormwater and municipal runoff. This channel and other similar flood control structures throughout the Los Angeles Basin and along the foothills of the San Gabriel Mountains were built following the devastating Los Angeles Flood of 1938.

=== Restoration programs ===
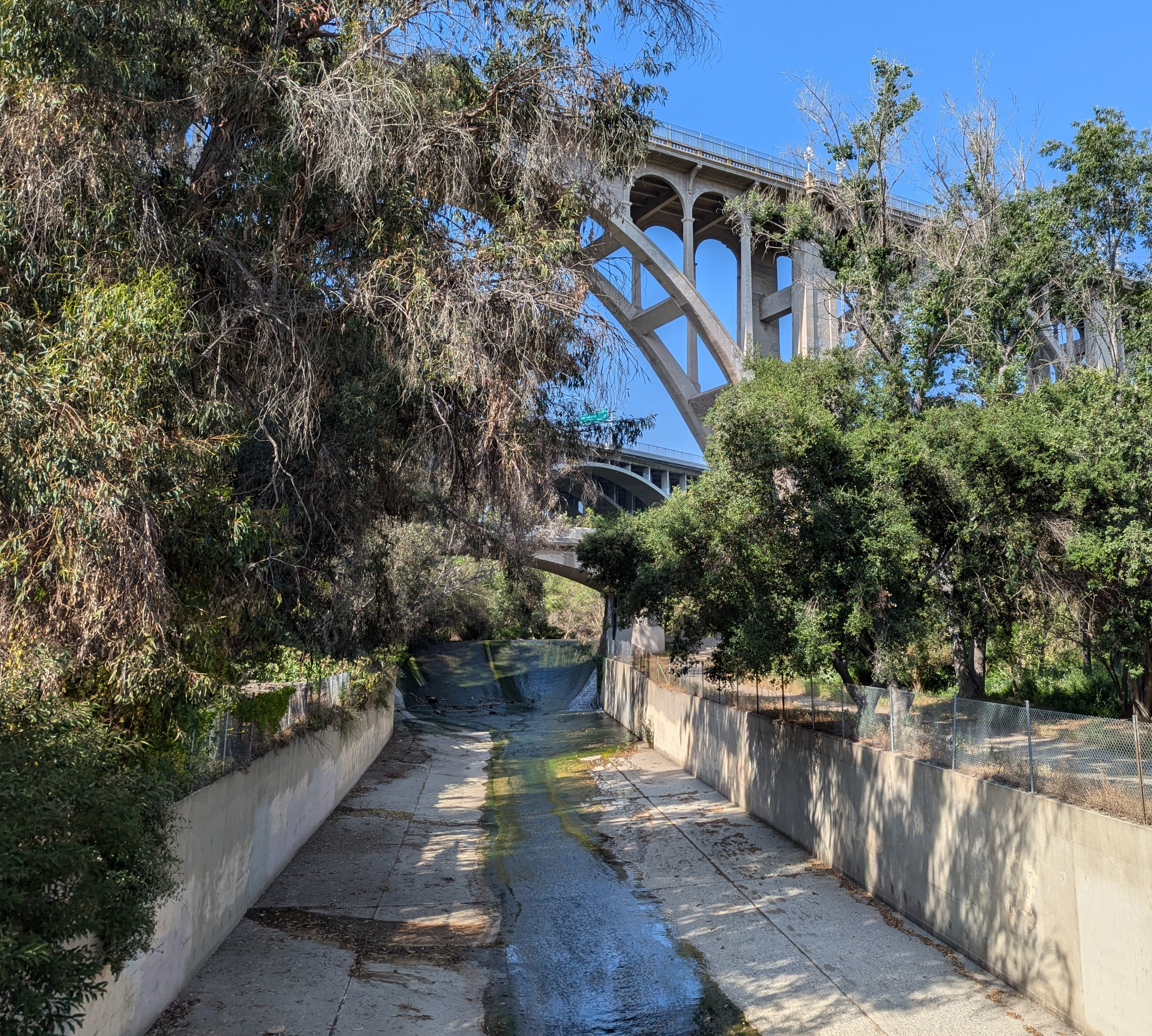
Arroyo Seco channel under the Colorado Street and Ventura Freeway bridges

For more than one hundred years, the natural environment of the Arroyo Seco and its proximity to a large urban population have inspired efforts to protect, manage and preserve it. L.A. County flood control was first founded in an effort to control the wild waters of the Arroyo Seco and Charles Lummis founded the Arroyo Seco Foundation in 1905 for the purpose of preserving recreational use and habitat, residents in Los Angeles and Pasadena contributed generously to efforts to buy up open space in the great canyon to protect for future generations. There has been a series of studies conducted to assess and improve the management of the Arroyo Seco Watershed. These include:

| Study or program | Year | Description |
|---|---|---|
| Arroyo Seco Watershed Restoration Feasibility Study | 2002 | A cooperative partnership of North East Trees and the Arroyo Seco Foundation, this report released in May, 2002, provides a blueprint for restoration and better management for the watershed. The study contains a series of valuable technical reports on hydrology, biology, water resources and recreational uses. |
| US Army Corps of Engineers Arroyo Seco Watershed Reconnaissance Study | 2002– | Evaluates watershed conditions and determines there is a federal purpose in Arroyo Seco work. |
| Pasadena Arroyo Seco Master Plan & EIR | 2003 | Identifies a comprehensive series of projects and improvements for the five mile (8 km) stretch of the Arroyo Seco lying within Pasadena |
| Angeles National Forest Master Plan – US Forest Service | 2005 | Defines the plan for the management of the upper mountain watershed of the Arroyo Seco |
| Arroyo Seco Watershed Coordination Program (Arroyo Seco Foundation) | 2004– ongoing | Builds the capacity of local groups to cooperate and collaborate in watershed management. In addition to educational programs about California's water issues and local water programs, this program supports the Council of Arroyo Seco Organization, a network of Arroyo improvement groups. |
| Arroyo Seco Parkway Corridor Management Plan | 2004 | Parkway management plan prepared for Caltrans by the National Scenic Byways Center, Federal Highways, the National Trust for Historic Preservation, and the Center for Preservation Education and Planning (CPEP, Inc.). This plan serves as the basis for signage and other recent improvements on the parkway. |
| USACE Arroyo Seco Watershed Feasibility Study | 2005– ongoing | This study, conducted by the US Army Corps of Engineers with the County of Los Angeles and other local partners is evaluating the watershed to determine the best program to improve water resources, habitat and recreational opportunities; the study, which actually began in 2001 continues on a slow pace, but local sponsors hope that it will provide a basis for federal support of local restoration and management efforts. |
| AS Watershed Management and Restoration Study (North East Trees) | 2006 | Reviews water quality and habitat restoration data and prioritizes projects for water quality improvements |
| Central Arroyo Stream Restoration Program | 2007–2008 | This program, which has now been completed, has improved stream conditions and water quality in the Arroyo Seco stream by habitat restoration, parking lot and trail improvements and trash capture devices. As a result, the Arroyo chub, a native fish that once thrived in the stream but was wiped out by the flood control measures, has now been reintroduced to the stream. |
| Arroyo Seco Watershed Sustainability Program | 2007–2010 | A program to improve conservation, watershed management and governance in the watershed |
| Fish Restoration in the Arroyo Seco | 2008 | This study, conducted by C. Camm Swift, evaluates the potential for fish restoration in the stream and makes recommendations about needed improvements. |
| Arroyo Seco Watershed Assessment | 2010 | This program provides an assessment of major projects to restore and enhance the Arroyo Seco Watershed and is intended to inform the Corps of Engineers ecosystem study of the Arroyo. The study was prepared by CDM for the Arroyo Seco Foundation. |
| Hahamongna Cooperative Nursery | 2015 | Hahamongna Cooperative Nursery is a grassroots habitat restoration initiative led by the Arroyo Seco Foundation in partnership with Pasadena Water and Power and Pasadena Public Works Department. Under the leadership of Nursery Manager Nick Hummingbird, volunteers are working to propagate local native plant species for habitat restoration as part of the Arroyo Seco Canyon Project, a joint project with Pasadena Water and Power. In the process, volunteers learn about the Arroyo's native flora and ecology, horticultural technique, nursery management, and local ethnobotany. |

==== Restoration goals ====
1. Restore full flood control functions in the Arroyo Seco area.
2. Better manage, optimize, and conserve water resources while improving water quality.
3. Improve regional park recreational opportunities and enhance nature reserve open space.

The restoration efforts are being carried out by the County of Los Angeles and local cities, primarily the City of Pasadena.

==== Jet Propulsion Laboratory – NASA ====
Early rocket-engine-testing began in the Arroyo Seco in 1936 and this led to the establishment of the Jet Propulsion Laboratory (JPL) at the mouth of the Arroyo Seco by the California Institute of Technology. During the 1950s, JPL was heavily involved in rocket testing, and the roar of rocket engines could be heard emanating from the Arroyo Seco area for miles. These rocket projects were terminated at the facility by 1958. By the mid-1960s, JPL had become instrumental in the development, launching, and tracking of a number of unmanned near-Earth and deep-space space probes for the National Aeronautics and Space Administration. One notable project was the Mars rover, which has returned a number of panoramic photos of the Martian surface.

JPL has been criticized by regional environmentalists and the community for its water pollution of the local groundwater with toxic chemicals, such as solvents and perchlorate rocket fuel accelerants. A monumental cleanup project by NASA has begun, which includes a multimillion-dollar pumping and water filtration system to treat the groundwater, removing toxins until the aquifer contamination level has been reduced below their federally-specified limits. This project is carried out by a NASA project team and monitored by the U.S. Environmental Protection Agency. Frequent public meetings are held with public comment, and recorded for the record on the quality and progress of the clean-up.

==== Trout Restoration ====
Before channelization, the Arroyo Seco was a spawning habitat for Southern Steelhead, the Anadromous form of rainbow trout. The Arroyo was home to a resident rainbow trout population until at least 2009, when mudslides following the Station Fire (2009) were thought to have wiped out the population. In November 2020, the California Department of Fish and Wildlife transplanted almost 500 trout from the West Fork San Gabriel River, definitively re-establishing the presence of native trout in the stream.

== Crossings ==
From mouth to source (year built in parentheses):

- Railroad
- North Avenue 19 - twin bridges (1956)
- North San Fernando Road (1913)
- I-5 - Golden State Freeway and ramps (1962)
- West Avenue 26 (1939)
- Southbound State Route 110 ramp to Interstate 5 (1962)
- Interstate 5 ramp to northbound State Route 110 (1962)
- Cypress Avenue [Pedestrian Bridge] (1961)
- Avenue 35 Railroad Bridge carrying Metro A Line (1940)
- Pasadena Avenue (1940)
- State Route 110 ramps to East Avenue 43 (1940)
- East Avenue 43 (1939)
- Sycamore Grove Park [Pedestrian Bridge] (1940)
- South/East Avenue 52 (1940)
- Via Marisol [originally Hermon Avenue] (1940)
- [Pedestrian Bridge]
- South Avenue 60 (1909)
- State Route 110 ramps to South Avenue 60 (1940)
- Santa Fe Arroyo Seco Railroad Bridge carrying Metro A Line (1896)
- Marmion Way (1940) and California 110 Offramp (1940)
- York Boulevard (1912)
- SR 110 - Arroyo Seco Parkway (formerly Pasadena Freeway) (1939)
- San Pasqual Avenue (1939)
- Dirt road
- South San Rafael Avenue (1922)
- La Loma Road (1914)
- Lower Arroyo Park dirt road
- Lower Arroyo Park [Pedestrian Bridge] (1914)
- Colorado Street Bridge carrying West Colorado Boulevard (1913)
- SR 134 - Ventura Freeway (1953)
- North Arroyo Boulevard (1927)
- West Holly Street (1925)
- Seco Street (1939)
- Rose Bowl Parking Lot [2 Pedestrian Bridges]
- Brookside Golf Course [7 Pedestrian Bridges]
- West Washington Boulevard (1939)
- Brookside Golf Course [Pedestrian Bridge]
- I-210 - Foothill Freeway (1974)
- Oak Grove Drive (1955)
- Devil's Gate Dam
- Explorer Road
- Forest Route 2N70 (2002)

== Attractions and landmarks ==
=== Upper Arroyo – mountains section ===
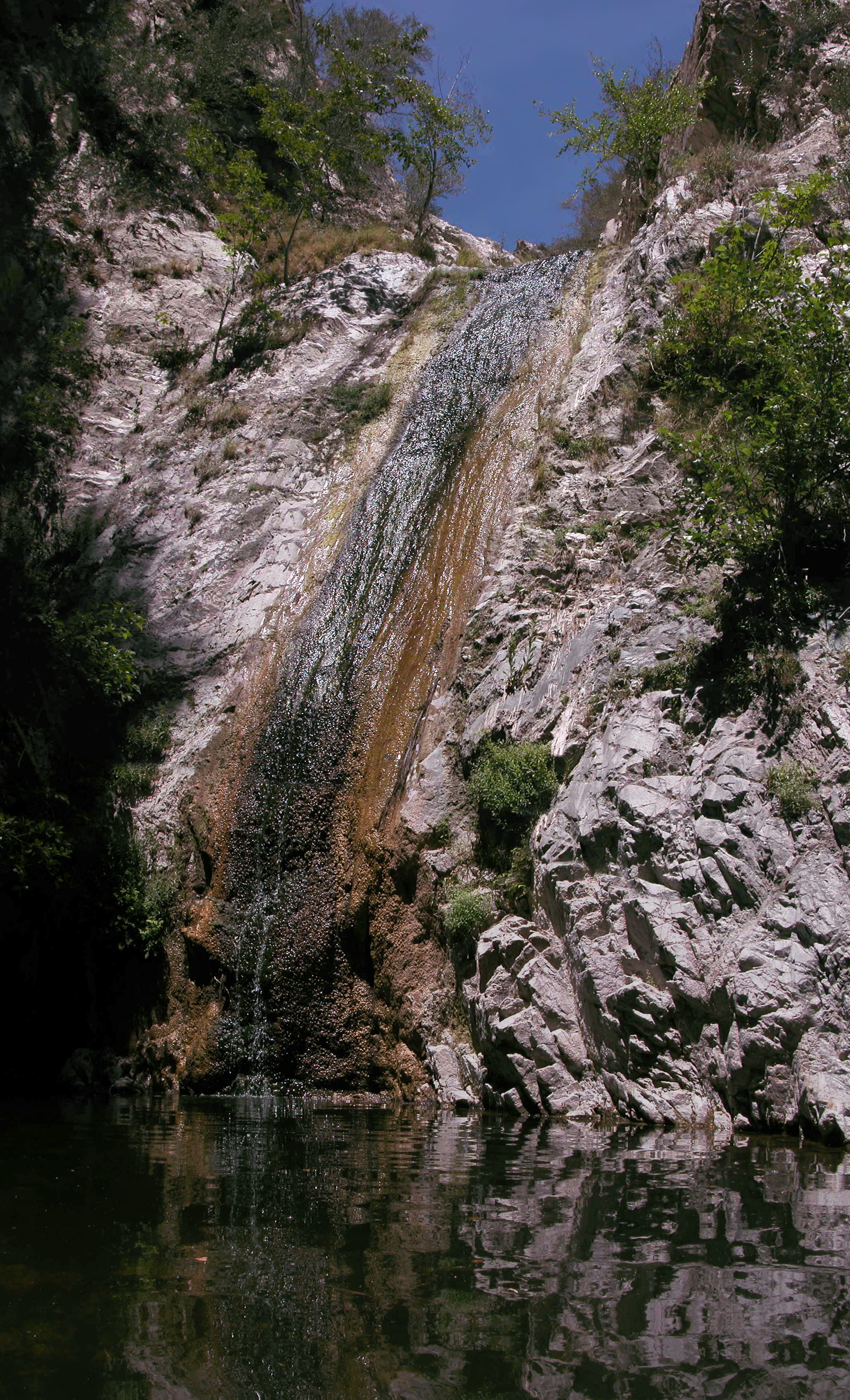
Upper Arroyo Seco: Switzer Falls in the Angeles National Forest.

To many, the Arroyo Seco is one of the most popular hiking spots in Southern California. The mountainous part of the Arroyo Seco is located within the Angeles National Forest. Angeles Crest Highway skirts the western edge of the Arroyo Seco Canyon.

The following is a list of Forest Service facilities in the Upper Arroyo, from south to north:

- Forest Service Employee Housing w/ attached public hitching rail and horse trough
- Teddy's Outpost Picnic Area
- Gould Mesa Campground
- Niño Picnic Area
- Paul Little Picnic Area
- Oakwilde Campground
- Commodore Perry Switzer Trail Camp
- Switzer's Picnic Area
- Red Box Station (at the canyon's head)
- Switzer Falls
- Dawn Mine
- Bear Canyon
- Millard Canyon – Millard Canyon Falls

Millard Canyon, located near the mouth of the Arroyo, is a canyon with a waterfall. Sunset Ridge The trail skirts the eastern side of the canyon, the eastern boundary of the Arroyo Seco Watershed. Millard Canyon was a major pedestrian thoroughfare for Tongva, Serrano people, and other Californian Native Americans traveling between the Los Angeles Basin coastal plain, the San Gabriel Mountains, and the Mojave Desert regions of Southern California.

Brown Mountain Truck Trail, which begins near the confluence of El Prieto Canyon and proceeds across the front range of the San Gabriel Mountains to upper Millard Canyon, offers impressive vistas of the San Gabriel Valley. The Burton Trail descends from this road to the upper stretches of the Arroyo near Oakwilde Campground.

The Gabrielino Trail, which is a popular journey for hikers, equestrians and bicyclists, travels up the steep canyon. A popular hike on the Gabrielino Trail is the 4 mile round trip to lower Switzer Falls from Switzer Picnic area.

=== Lower Arroyo – urban section ===
- Jet Propulsion Laboratory NASA
- Oak Grove Disc Golf Course
- Hahamongna Watershed Park – (formerly "Oak Grove Park")
- Devil's Gate Dam
- Brookside Golf Course
- Rose Bowl – stadium and flea market
- Bellefontaine/Governor Markham, Pasadena, California
- Brookside Park
- Kidspace Children's Museum
- Colorado Street Bridge
- Hotel Vista Del Arroyo – United States 9th District Court of Appeals
- Lower Arroyo Park Archery Range
- Pasadena Roving Archers
- Pasadena Casting Club
- Lower Arroyo Seco Historic District, including the Batchelder House – Arts and Crafts Movement
- Arroyo Seco Parkway
- Los Angeles Metro Rail A Line (Bridge crossing and Highland Park station)
- Southwest Museum of the American Indian
- "El Alisal" – Lummis House – historic home museum and native plants gardens.
- Heritage Square Museum – historic Victorian houses park.
- Los Angeles River Center and Gardens Park
- Confluence of the Arroyo Seco and Los Angeles River

== See also ==
- Artists of the Arroyo Seco (Los Angeles)
- List of Los Angeles Historic-Cultural Monuments on the East and Northeast Sides
- Los Angeles and San Gabriel Valley Railroad
- Riparian zone
  - Floodplain restoration
  - Riparian-zone restoration
- Urban runoff
  - Flood Control Act of 1941
  - Los Angeles flood of 1938

== Gallery ==
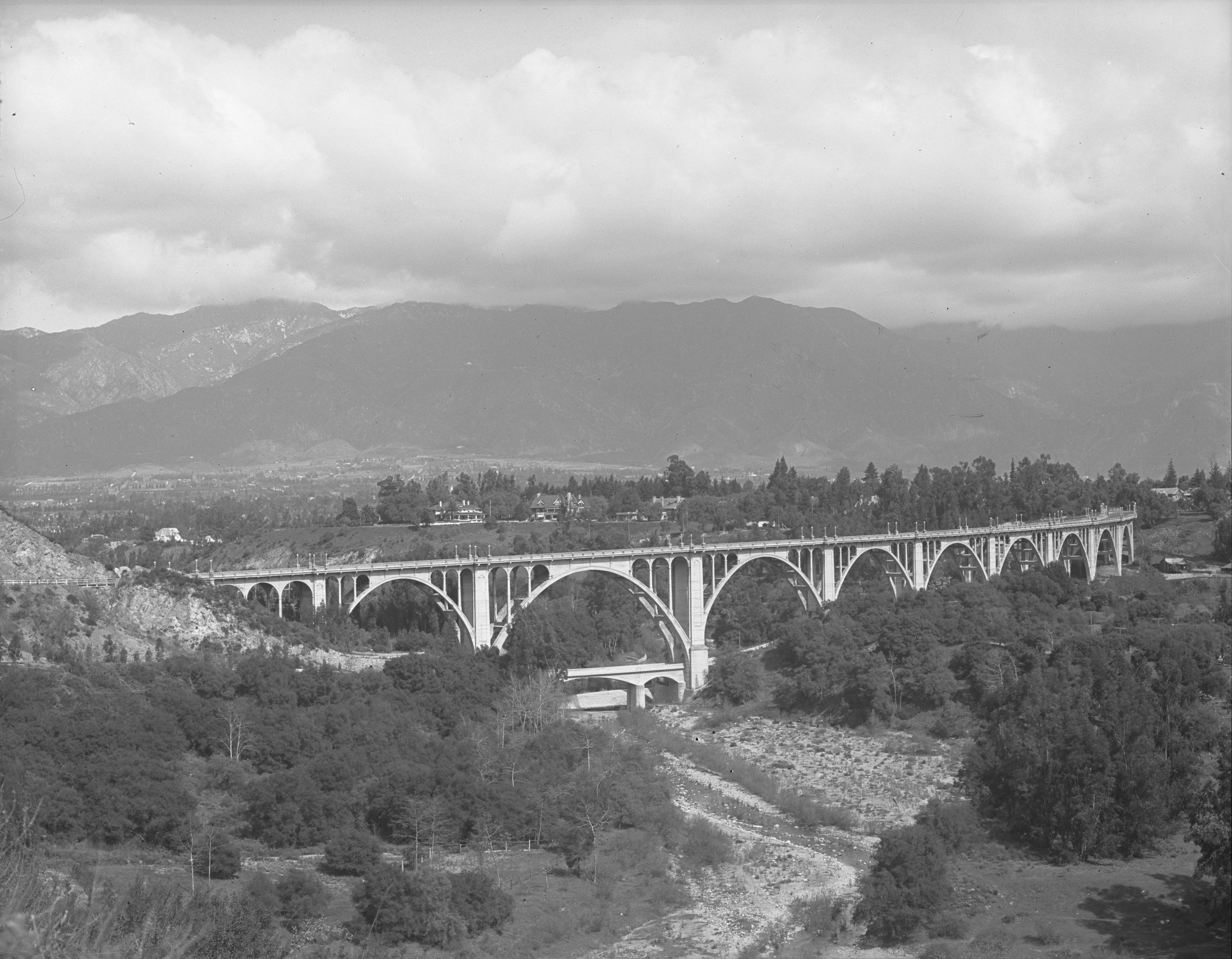
The Colorado Street Bridge over the Arroyo, with the San Gabriel Mountains in the background, around 1920.

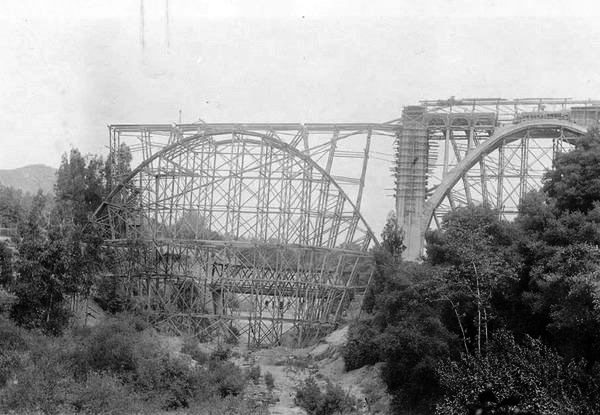
1913 view looking north at the Colorado Street Bridge over the Arroyo, under construction and the Scoville Bridge behind.

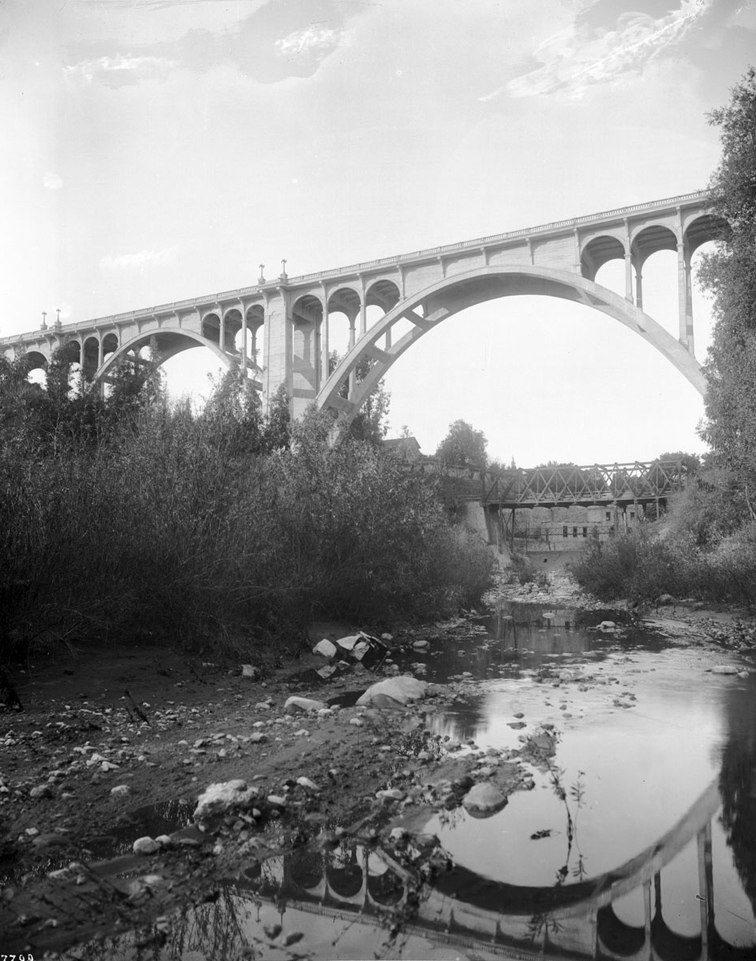
1914 Colorado Street Bridge just completed, and the Scoville Bridge, that a flood washed away later.

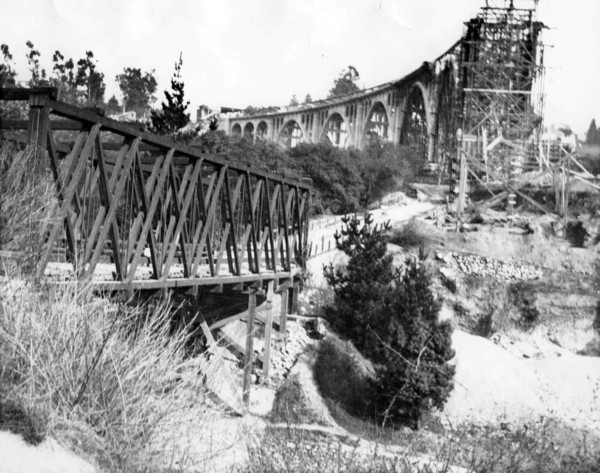
A 1913 view of the Scoville Bridge next to the partially completed Colorado Street Bridge.

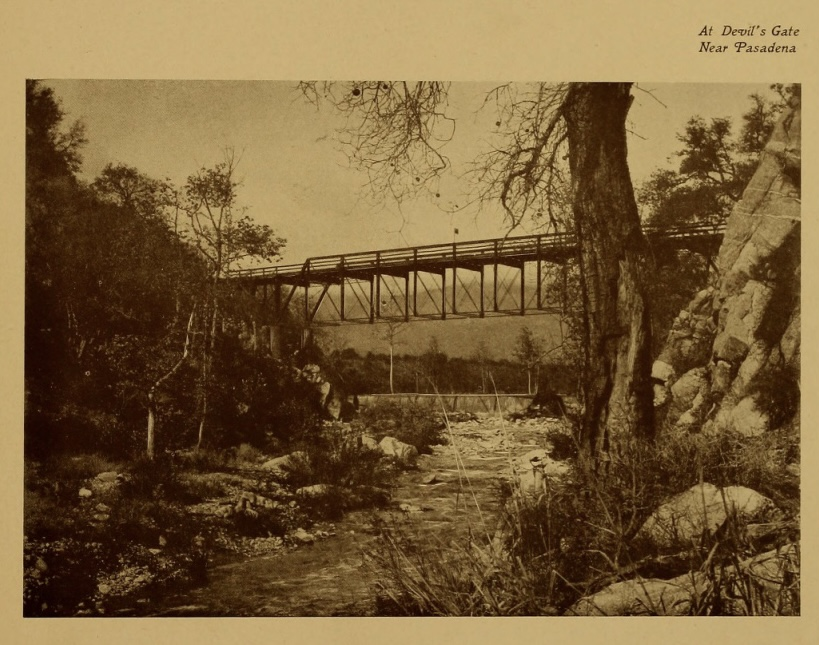
"At Devil's Gate Near Pasadena" 1904
