= Raymond Fault =

Seismic fault in California

- Etymology: named for Raymond Hill
- Location: Los Angeles County and Ventura County
- Country: USA
- State: California

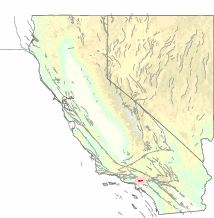
The Raymond Fault in Southern California, United States.

The Raymond Fault is a fault across central Los Angeles County and western Ventura County in Southern California.

== San Gabriel Valley area ==
The eastern end of the Raymond Fault branches from the San Andreas Fault in the San Gabriel Mountains where it forms the east fork of the San Gabriel River and Monrovia Canyon. The fault is very straight and follows a WbS path. It then goes straight west through Arcadia and the Santa Anita Racetrack in the San Gabriel Valley, and then forms the San Rafael Hills in San Marino and South Pasadena, and Raymond Hill, after which the fault is named.

== Los Angeles–Ventura areas ==
The fault continues west to form the hills of Highland Park, the lower eastern Santa Monica Mountains from Dodger Stadium, Silver Lake, and Griffith Park through the Hollywood Hills above the Sunset Strip and Studio City. Further west the Raymond Fault creates the higher central and western Santa Monica Mountains from Beverly Hills and along the southern San Fernando Valley to Thousand Oaks and Malibu, and on to Point Mugu at the Pacific Ocean. The fault then continues underwater to form the northern Channel Islands, and beyond to where it terminates.
