= Kenneth Newell Bikeway =

Cycling route in Pasadena, California, USA

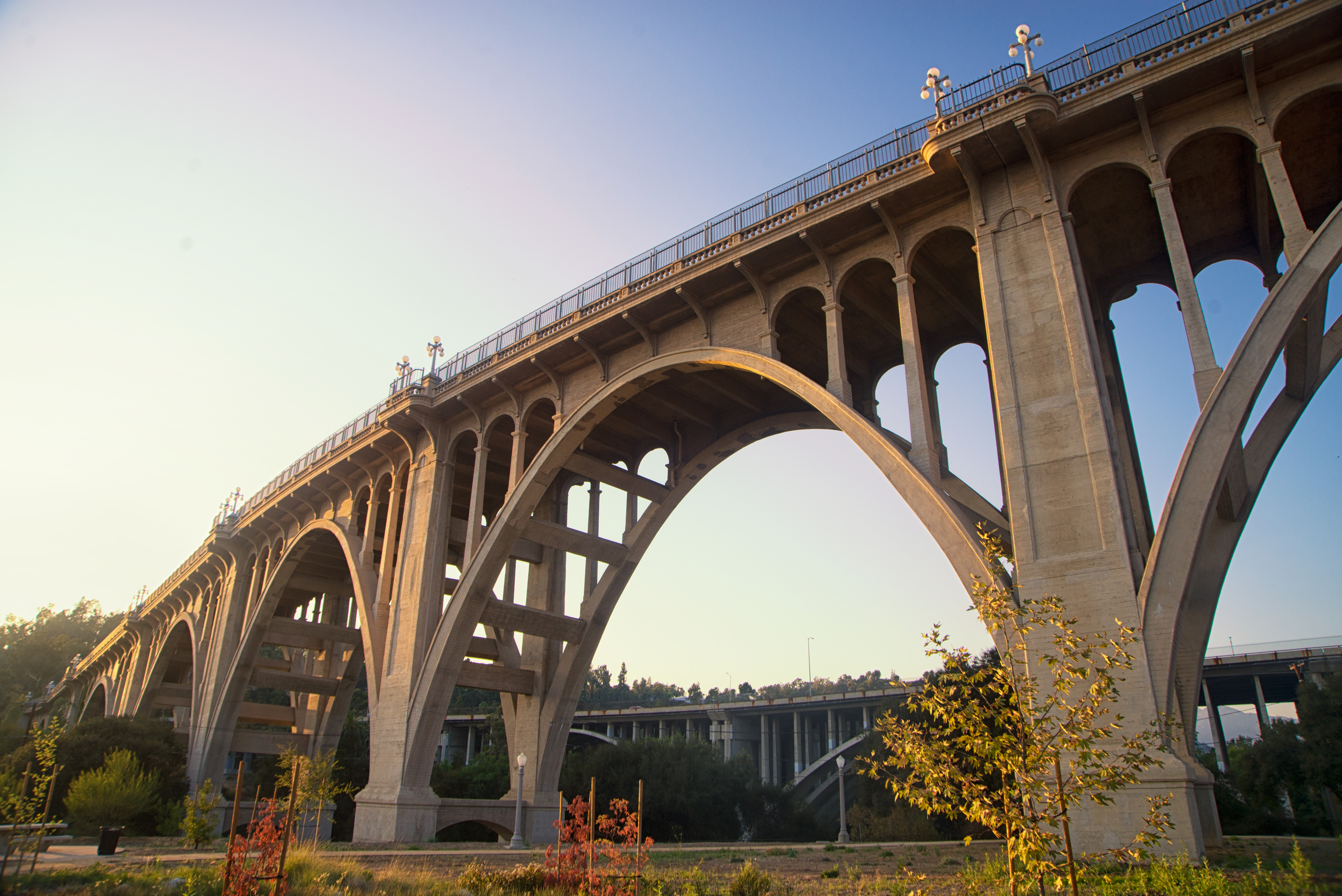
- Colorado Street Bridge
- Length: 5 mi (8.0 km)
- Location: Los Angeles County
- Established: 1966
- Trailheads: South: 34.1196°N 118.1704°W; North: 34.1970°N 118.1740°W
- Use: Active transportation, road biking
- Elevation gain/loss: 320 ft
- Difficulty: Moderate
- Surface: asphalt

The Kenneth Newell Bikeway in Pasadena is one of the first bike paths established in Los Angeles County. The bikeway is appreciated for its scenery. The path travels through the canyon of the Arroyo Seco river, a tributary of the Los Angeles River.

The route is described as “flat except for moderately steep hills at either end.” Kenneth Newell Bikeway “offers close-up views of some fine old Pasadena homes in the Craftsman style”, an area recognized as the Lower Arroyo Seco Historic District.

Start near Stoney Lane at Arroyo Seco Park, head north to Arroyo Boulevard and turn left.

The route passes under the Colorado Boulevard and Route 134 bridges and then passes the Rose Bowl.

The trail crosses the dam at Devil's Gate Reservoir, passes Oak Grove Park and ends at the campus of the Jet Propulsion Laboratory.

Travelers using the route to go south can continue on the Arroyo Seco Bike Path.

Created in 1966, it was named for the first president of the Pasadena Kiwanis Club, which helped establish the route along with the City of Pasadena and the Pasadena Chamber of Commerce.

== See also ==
- List of Los Angeles bike paths
- Arroyo Seco bicycle path
