= Santa Fe Arroyo Seco Railroad Bridge =

Historic bridge in Los Angeles, USA

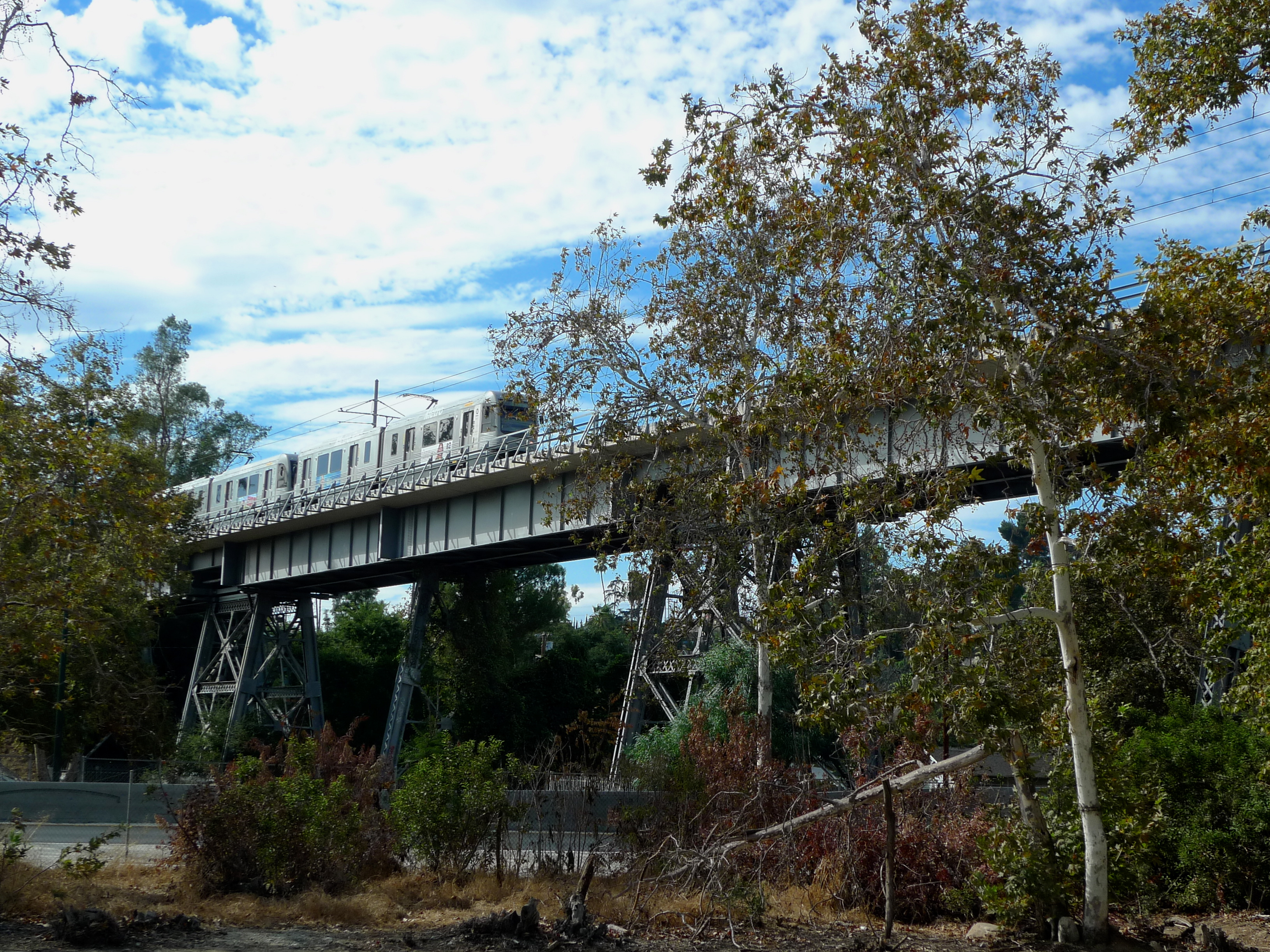
- The bridge with a Gold Line train.
- Interactive map of Santa Fe Arroyo Seco Railroad Bridge
- Location: 162 S. Avenue 61
- Coordinates: 34.110958°N 118.184373°W
- Built: 1896

Los Angeles Historic-Cultural Monument
- Designated: 1988
- Reference no.: 339

The Santa Fe Arroyo Seco Railroad Bridge in Highland Park, Los Angeles, is more than 710 feet (220 m) long and crosses the Arroyo Seco Parkway at an elevation of over 56 feet (17 m). It is the tallest and longest railroad span in the city of Los Angeles, and most likely the oldest such structure still in use. The bridge crosses the lower part of the Arroyo Seco, a watershed canyon from the San Gabriel Mountains.

== History ==
The Santa Fe Arroyo Seco bridge, built in 1896, replaced the 1889 wooden trestle used by the Southern California Railway, which was a subsidiary of the Santa Fe Railroad. The 1889 bridge, designed by Santa Fe's chief structural engineer Fred T. Perris, replaced the original 1885 wooden trestle bridge built by the Los Angeles and San Gabriel Valley Railroad. Mainline rail service ended in 1994. In the late 1990s, the bridge was retrofitted to accommodate Gold Line of the Los Angeles Metro Rail system, which opened on July 26, 2003. The A Line now runs on the bridge's tracks following the Regional Connector's opening in June 2023.

Advocated by the Highland Park Heritage Trust and Charles J. Fisher, the bridge was declared City of Los Angeles Historic-Cultural Monument No. 339 on January 22, 1988.

== Gallery ==
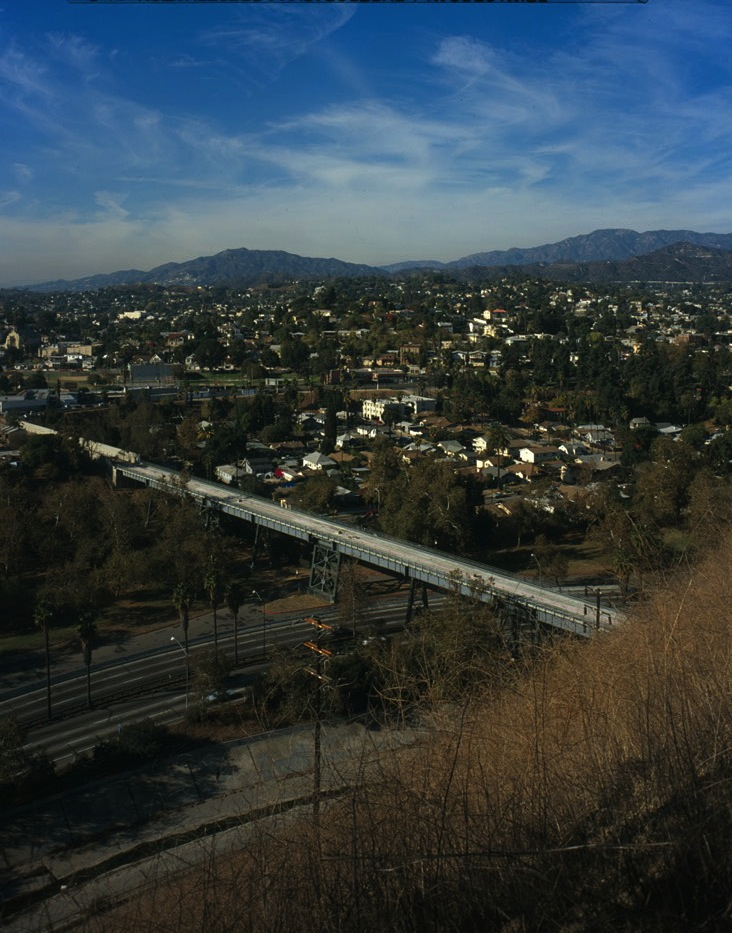
Aerial view of the bridge.

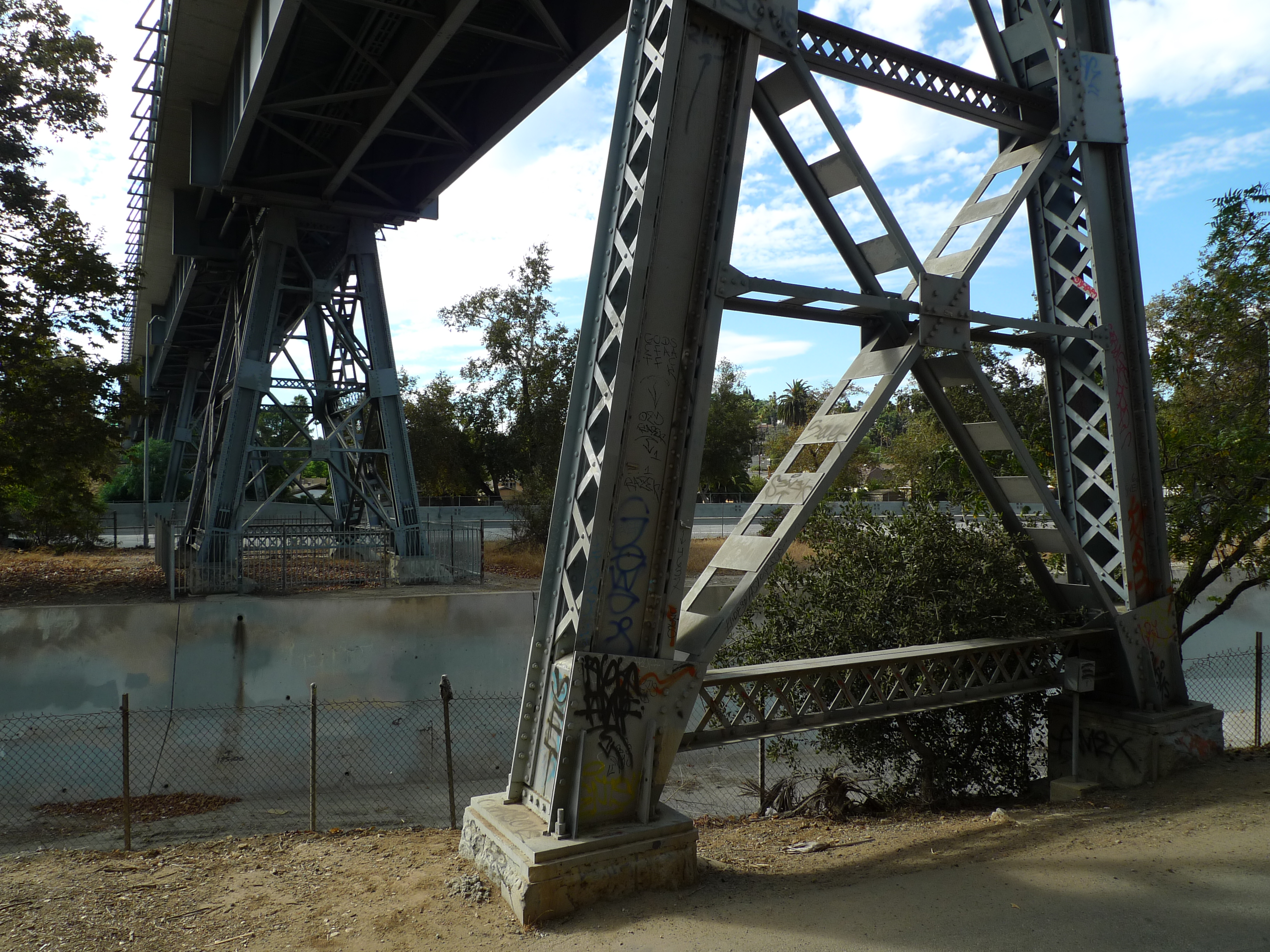
One of the bridge's trestles.

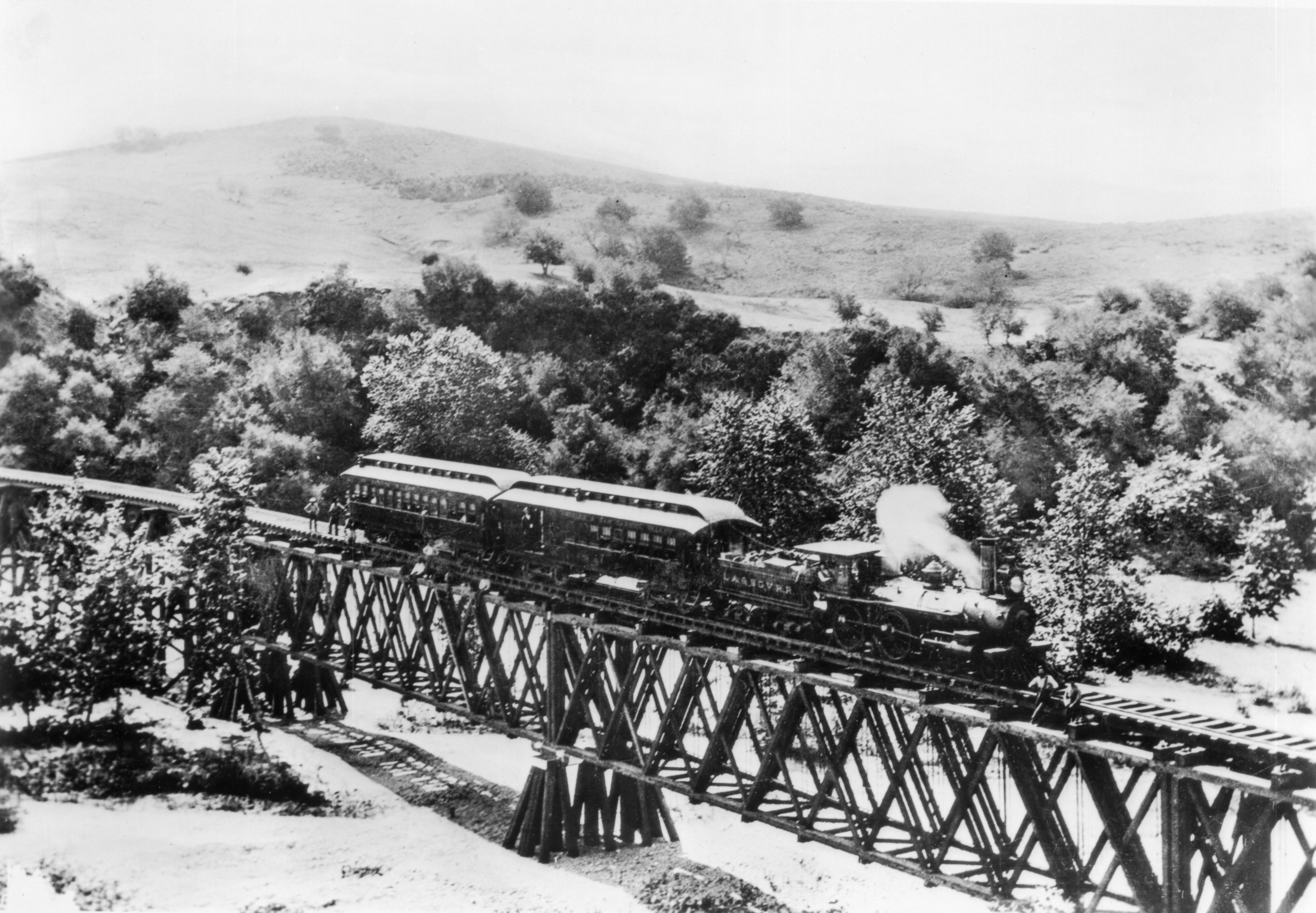
1885 view of the Los Angeles and San Gabriel Railroad crossing the Arroyo Seco near Garvanza - Highland Park

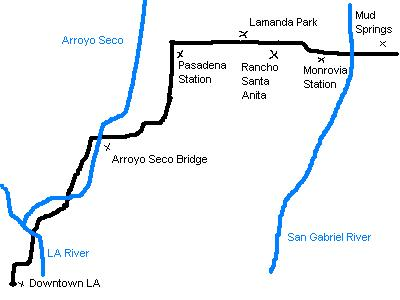
Rail line map of the Los Angeles and San Gabriel Valley Railroad 1885

== See also ==
- List of bridges documented by the Historic American Engineering Record in California
- List of Los Angeles Historic-Cultural Monuments on the East and Northeast Sides
- List of Registered Historic Places in Los Angeles
- History of Trains in Pasadena
- Southern Transcon
- Union Station (Los Angeles)
- Southwest Chief
- Atchison, Topeka and Santa Fe Railway
- Highland Park (Los Angeles Metro station)
- South Pasadena (Los Angeles Metro station)
