= Montecito Heights, Los Angeles =

Montecito Heights
- Neighborhood of Los Angeles
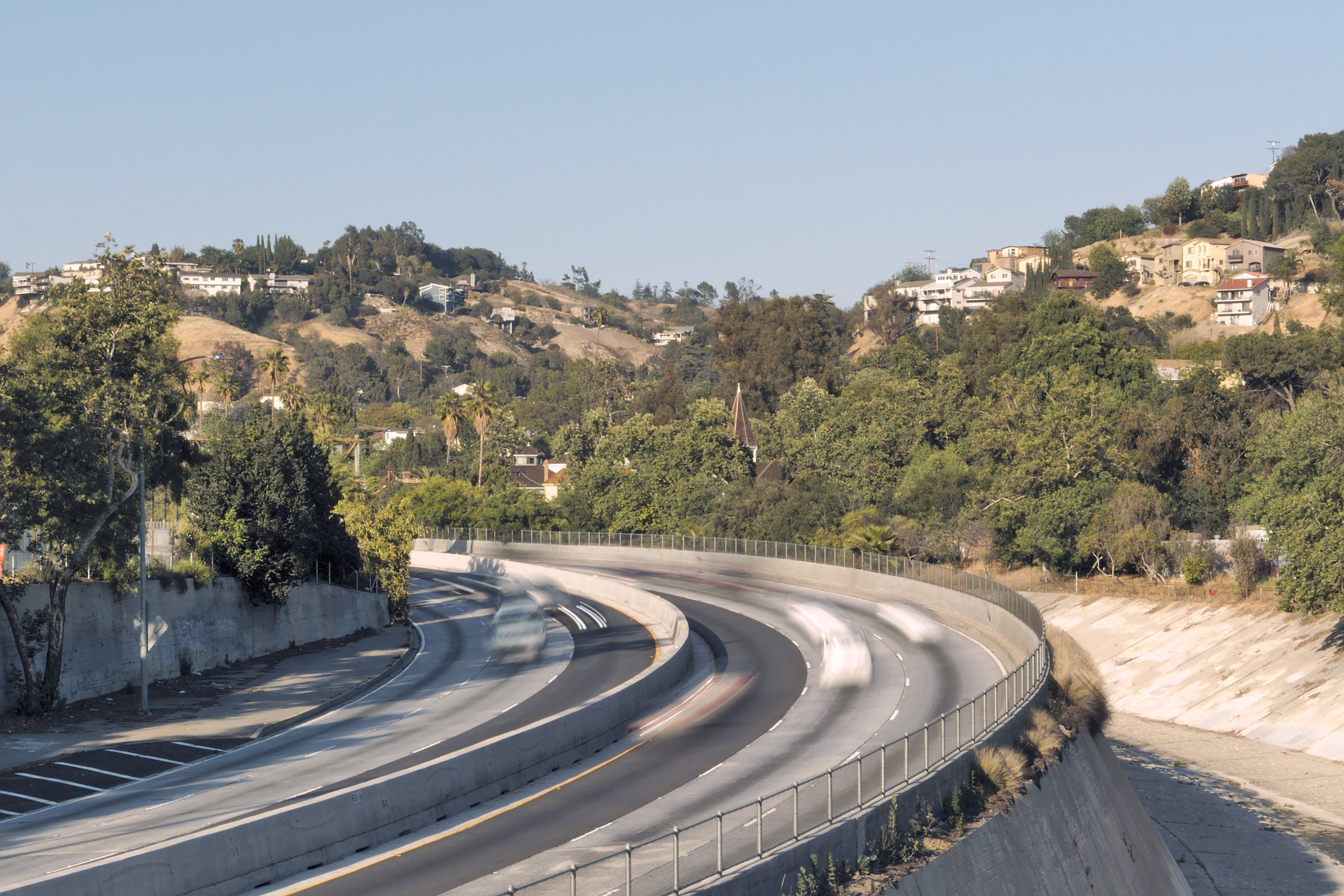
- Viewed from Pasadena Ave. bridge

- Location within Central Los Angeles
- Coordinates: 34.090258°N 118.202889°W
- Country: United States
- State: California
- County: Los Angeles
- City: Los Angeles
- Time zone: UTC-8 (PST)
  - Summer (DST): UTC-7 (PDT)
- ZIP code: 90031

Montecito Heights is a neighborhood in the Northeast Los Angeles region of Los Angeles, California. The population in 2000 was estimated at 16,768.

== Geography and transportation ==
Montecito Heights' boundaries are roughly the Pasadena Freeway (SR 110) or the Arroyo Seco on the northwest, Pasadena Avenue on the west, Avenue 35 to the south, Huntington Drive to the southeast, and Monterey Road to the east. Neighboring districts include Monterey Hills on the northeast, El Sereno on the southeast, Lincoln Heights on the southwest, Mount Washington on the northwest, and Highland Park on the north. Owing to the rugged terrain, no major thoroughfares run through the area, besides Griffin Avenue (Los Angeles). The district is largely in ZIP code 90031. Most of the homes on the hills were built after the 1950s when engineering technology enabled builders to construct on the steep hillsides.

== Neighborhood ==
Annexed to the City of Los Angeles in 1912, Montecito Heights is known by the residents as the 'Wilderness in the City'. Montecito Heights sits on the Monterey Hills that divide the Los Angeles Basin from the San Gabriel Valley. Montecito Heights is a relatively isolated area of greenery and trendy resident home restorers. City views are available on the district's hills. Along with neighboring Highland Park and Pasadena, it is one of the historic centers of the Arts and Crafts movement.

== Landmarks ==
- Ernest E. Debs Regional Park
- Heritage Square Museum
- Audubon Center

== Notable residents ==
- Alana Cordy-Collins, anthropologist and archaeologist
- Napoleon Cordy, Mayanist
- Bricia Lopez, author and restaurateur
- Tala Madani, artist
- Jackson Pollock, artist
