= Katharine Benedicta Trotter Claypole =

British born American suffragist (1846–1901)

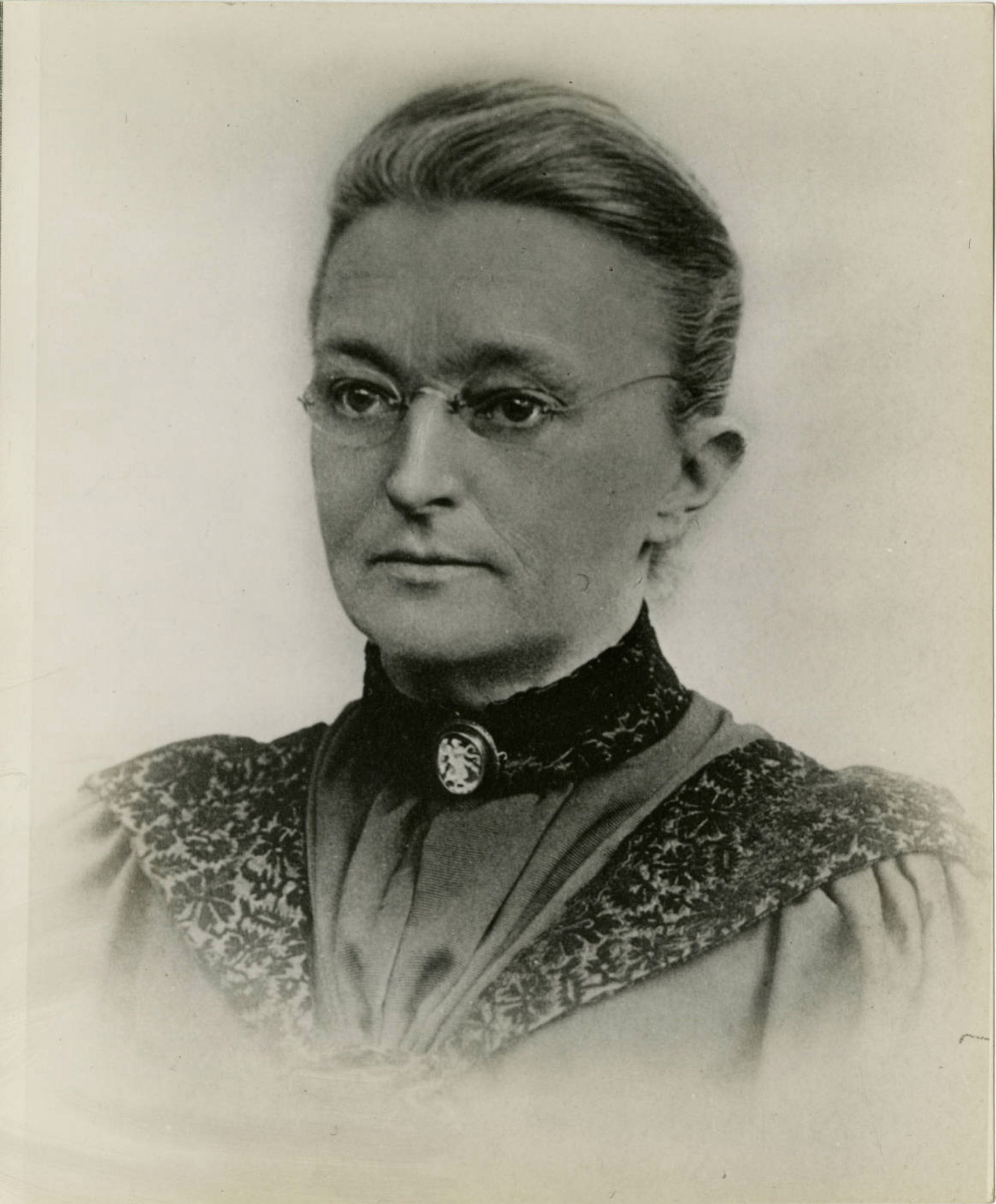
- Born: Kate Benedicta Trotter; 1846; Chepstow, Wales
- Died: 6 October 1901 (aged 54–55); Pasadena, California, US
- Occupations: Suffragist, author
- Organization(s): Ohio Woman Suffrage Association; Akron Women's Council; National American Woman Suffrage Association
- Spouse: Edward Waller Claypole
- Children: Edith Claypole, Agnes Claypole Moody (stepdaughters)

Katharine Benedicta Trotter Claypole (1846 – 6 October 1901) was a British born American suffragist and author. She was secretary of the Ohio Woman Suffrage Association and a collaborator in the work of her husband, naturalist and geologist Edward W. Claypole. Katharine Claypole was described as 'the founder... of organized woman's work' at Buchtel College (now the University of Akron).

== Early life ==
Kate Benedicta Trotter was born in Chepstow, Wales in 1846. In 1874, she passed the general examinations for women of the University of London in the first division. In about 1878, when Trotter was in her early 30s, she travelled to the United States to help her cousin's widower, Edward Claypole, raise his young twin daughters, Agnes Mary and Edith Jane. In 1879, Trotter married Claypole, then chair of the Department of Natural Sciences at Antioch College. Both Agnes and Edith Claypole went on to be scientists, and were initially educated at home by Edward and Katharine.

== Akron and activism ==
In 1883, Edward Claypole was appointed chair of Natural Sciences at Buchtel College, and the family moved to Akron, Ohio. It was there that Katharine became involved in the suffrage movement, helping to found the Akron Woman's Suffrage Association in 1889, alongside members of the university faculty. She was part of a vibrant group of Akron women, including other members and wives of university faculty, who were active in civic organisations and suffragism. As well as working for suffrage, Katharine organised a local council of women's societies in Akron. Inspired by the effectiveness of cooperation in the British women's suffrage movement, Claypole, along with Henrietta Chase, Isabella Berry, and Abby Soule Schumacher established the Akron Women's Council in November 1893. Caryn E. Neumann and Sherri Goudy write that:

The Council engaged in municipal housekeeping by establishing a separate juvenile justice system, creating a detention home for wayward youth, improving the educational system, and resolving health and sanitation problems in Akron. In essence, they demonstrated what women could do in politics.

In the same year, Claypole was instrumental in organising the New Century Club, and the Columbian Club. In 1894, Claypole became recording secretary of the Ohio State Suffrage Association (OSSA). While holding the position, she helped to pass a law allowing women to vote for, and serve as members, of school boards. With OSSA President Caroline McCulloch Everhard, she co-authored a pamphlet entitled Information for the Use of the Newly Made Voters in Ohio. Claypole was also a member of the National American Woman Suffrage Association.

Katharine Claypole was also the writer of popular science articles, some of which were published in Popular Science Monthly. Katherine was often credited as Edward Claypole's collaborator in his work as a scientist.

== Death and legacy ==
Edward and Katharine Claypole moved to Pasadena, California in 1898, owing to Katharine's weakening health. Edward Claypole died at Long Beach on 17 August 1901. Katharine Claypole died a few months later, on 6 October in Pasadena. She was 55 years old. Both were cremated, according to their expressed wishes.

After her death, members of the Akron Women's Council established the Katherine Claypole Students' Loan Fund, described as:

a loan fund for the use of students who, in mid-term, as often happens, find themselves without sufficient means to complete the year's work... To supply this need in Buchtel College, a number of women's organizations of Akron have created, and, through a committee, are managing a loan fund very appropriately dedicated as a memorial to one of their much loved members, Mrs. Katherine Claypole, the founder here of organized women's work, always deeply interested in young people, and for many years closely connected with Buchtel College.

In 1930, Ohio's League of Women Voters included Katherine Claypole on its State Honor Roll.

== Bibliography ==
- 'Recent Glacial Work in Europe' in Popular Science Monthly (May 1890)
- 'My Garden on an Onion' in Popular Science Monthly (May 1891)
- Information for the Use of the Newly Made Voters in Ohio, with Caroline McCulloch Everhard (1894)
