= Mary Blair Moody =

American physician, anatomist and editor (1837–1919)

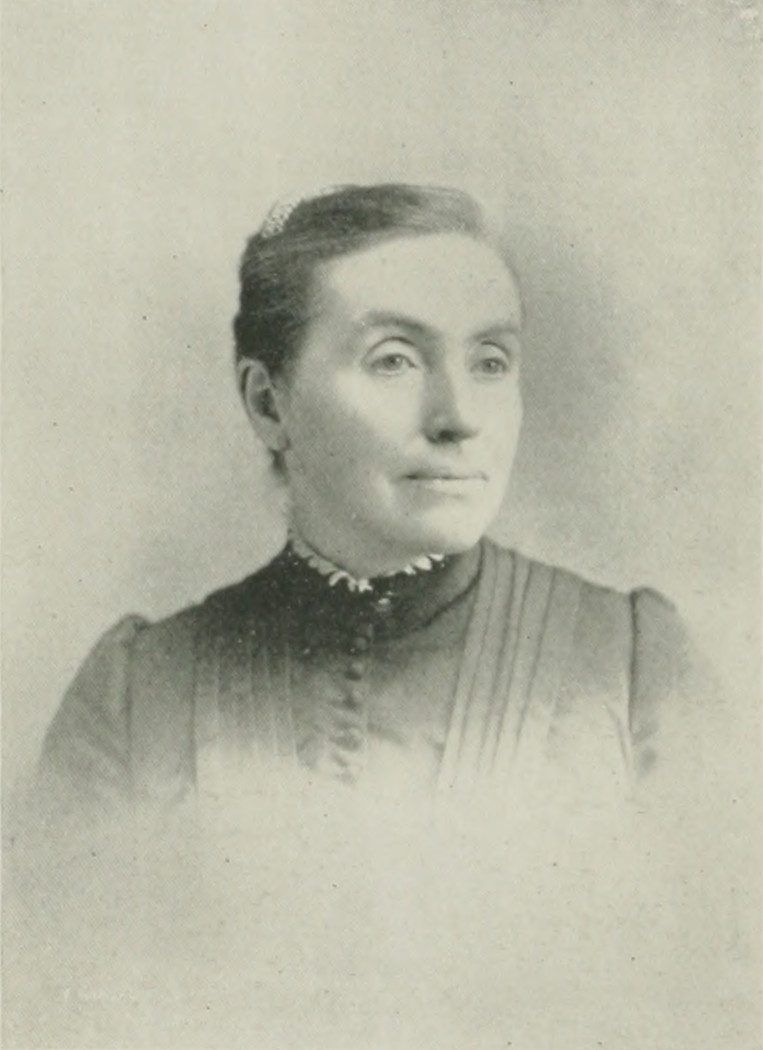
- Moody's portrait in A Woman of the Century (1893)
- Born: Mary Jane Blair; August 8, 1837; Barker, Broome County, New York
- Died: August 18, 1919 (aged 82); New Haven, Connecticut
- Burial place: Spring Forest Cemetery in Broome County, New York
- Occupations: Physician, anatomist, editor
- Children: 7
- Relatives: Lewis Pease (uncle); Charles Amadon Moody (son); Agnes Claypole Moody (daughter in-law); Blair Moody (grandson); Blair Moody Jr. (great grandson)

Mary Jane Blair Moody (August 8, 1837 – August 18, 1919) was an American physician, anatomist and editor. She was the first woman to earn a degree from Buffalo Medical College, the first female member of the American Association of Anatomists, and one of the first women to practice medicine in New Haven, Connecticut. Her home there is listed on the National Register of Historic Places as the Dr. Mary B. Moody House.

== Early life, education, and family ==
Mary Jane Blair was born on August 8, 1837, in Barker, Broome County, New York, the daughter of Asa Edson Blair and Caroline Pease. Her mother had enjoyed brief fame as a poet under the pen name Waif Woodland. She was one of seven children. She continued her studies while working as a teacher in the public schools. At one time she worked as a teacher for her uncle Lewis Pease.

In 1860 Blair married Lucius Wilbur Moody, a school administrator. The couple moved to Buffalo, where Lucius entered the insurance business, and eventually they had seven children. During her marriage, Moody continued her studies, attending Woman's Medical College of Pennsylvania, but illness and the needs of her family prevented completion of her degree.

In 1874, Moody became the first woman medical student at Buffalo Medical College (now SUNY Buffalo). She encountered some resistance from the faculty, though generally they "treated her well." One faculty member told her, “No lady will wish to study medicine". Despite that, she earned her Doctor of Medicine degree in 1876 and graduated with honors. She was the first woman to earn a medical degree from that institution. A terrace at the Joseph P. Ellicott complex at the school is now named in her honor.

== Career ==
Moody practiced medicine for about nine years in Buffalo, New York. While there she lectured at the Women's Gymnasium. In 1882, she founded the Women's and Children's Dispensary in Buffalo and served as its senior physician. She was also active in reviewing and editing. She wrote book reviews for Buffalo Medical and Surgical Journal and was editor of the Bulletin of the Buffalo Naturalist Field Club.

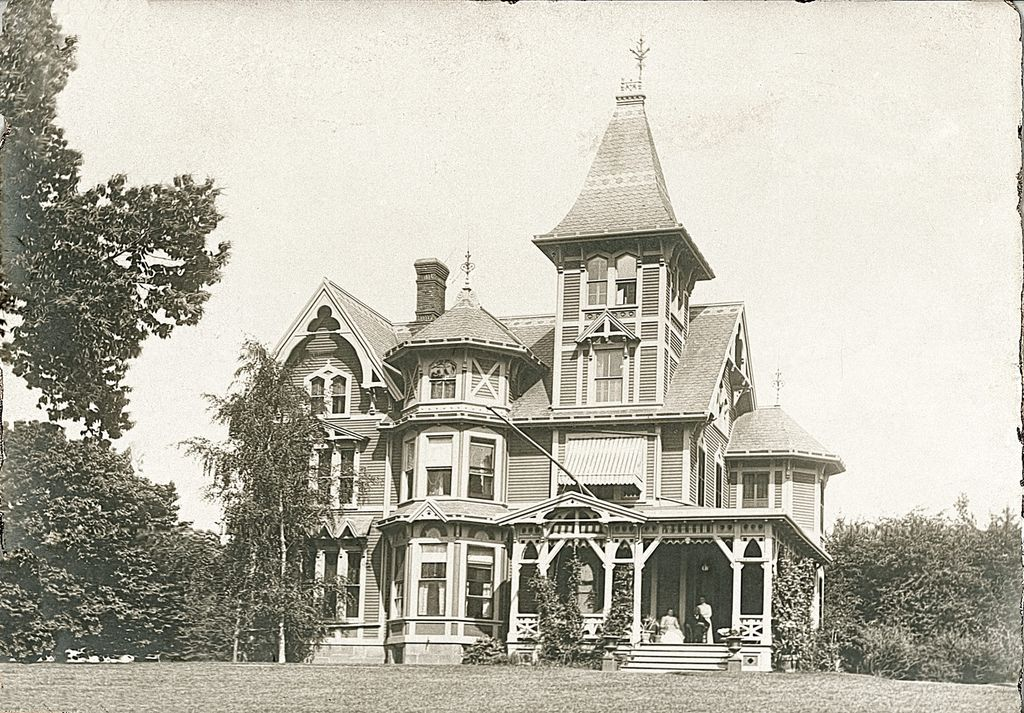
The Dr. Mary B. Moody House in New Haven where Moody practiced medicine from 1890 through 1903

Moody and her family moved to New Haven, Connecticut, in 1886 where her husband ran the state office for the Northwestern Mutual Life Insurance Company. Moody quickly established herself as one of just a few women physicians in the city. Moody was a member of the Connecticut Medical Society and the National Medical Association, and in 1894 she became the first woman member of the American Association of Anatomists.

Moody's interest in science extended beyond medicine to fields such as botany. She maintained memberships in the American Microscopical Association and the American Association for the Advancement of Science. She discovered a species of orchid in the United States called Epipactis latifolia previously only thought to be found in the United Kingdom. She was made a Fellow of the American Association for the Advancement of Science for her work.

== Later life and death ==
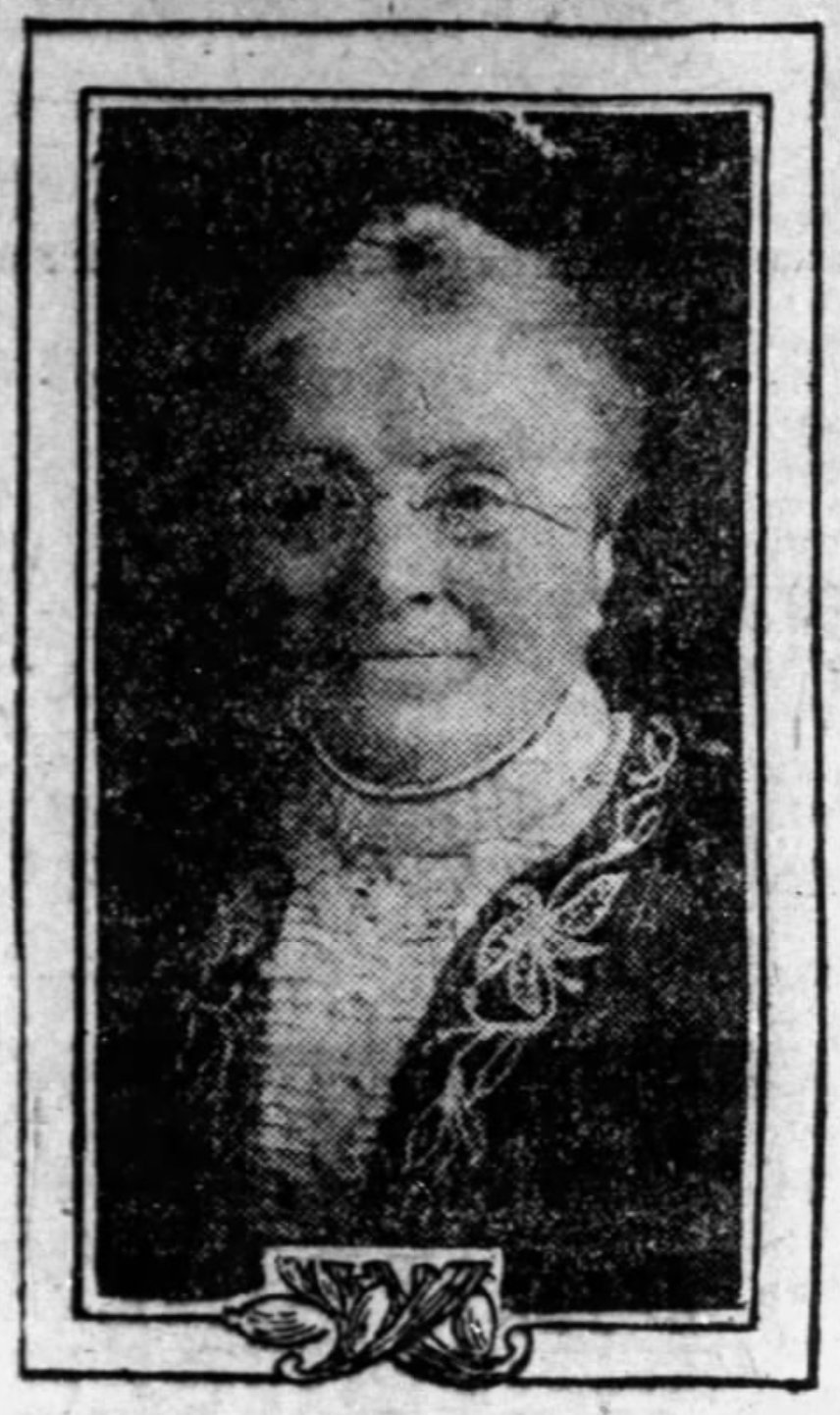
Moody c. 1919

After her husband's death in January 1903, Moody moved to Pasadena, California, to live near two of her sons, one of whom (Dr. Robert Orton Moody) had married Agnes Claypole Moody. Another of Moody's sons, Arthur, was the father of journalist and United States Senator Blair Moody, and another Charles Amadon Moody was the editor of Out West. She later returned to New Haven to live with her daughter, Mary Grace Moody.

Moody died in New Haven on August 18, 1919, at age 82 and was buried at Spring Forest Cemetery in Broome County, New York, near where she was born. Her long-time home in New Haven has been preserved as the Dr. Mary B. Moody House and was listed on the National Register of Historic Places in 2017.
