= Charles Moody =

Charles Moody may refer to:

- Charles Moody (MP) (1792–1867), British Conservative Party politician
- Charles E. Moody (1891–1977), American gospel songwriter
- Charles Amadon Moody (1863–1910), American author and book reviewer
- Charles Harry Moody (1874–1965), English composer and organist
- Charles Arundel Moody (1917–2009), Black British soldier
