= Lummis Day =

Lummis Day is a signature community arts and music event in the neighborhoods of Northeast Los Angeles, showcasing the community's considerable pool of musicians, poets, artists, dancers and restaurants representing a kaleidoscope of ethnicities and cultural traditions. Since 2014, Occidental College's Institute for the Study of Los Angeles has partnered with the Lummis Day Community Foundation to support cultural programming.

For the community, Lummis Day was a party with a purpose, a cultural showcase for the various ethnicities and cultures that share the Northeast Los Angeles neighborhoods. In 2008, attendance reached 9,000 people – making it into one of the area's biggest annual events.

== Charles Fletcher Lummis ==
Lummis Day is named for Charles Fletcher Lummis—author, adventurer, early advocate of multiculturalism, and founder of the Southwest Museum.

Lummis played a role in the cultural history of Los Angeles of the 1880s-1920s. He settled into Northeast Los Angeles in 1895 and built a home out Arroyo Seco river rock on the borders of the Highland Park and Montecito Heights communities. Celebrated as a city of Los Angeles and state of California Historical Monument, the Lummis Home which he named El Alisal, is included on the National Register of Historic Places, the List of California Historical Landmarks and is owned and maintained by the Los Angeles Department of Recreation and Parks. Lummis used his home to host gatherings of artists, journalists, and prominent people of his time. In 1907 Lummis opened the Southwest Museum of the American Indian in nearby Mount Washington. It was the first public museum in the city of Los Angeles and operated today by the Autry Museum of the American West.

== 2015 10th Anniversary Festival June 5,6 and 7 ==
Lummis Day-The Festival of Northeast Los Angeles, marked its 10th anniversary with an expansion to a three-day event at five Northeast L.A. sites on June 5, 6 and 7, featuring music, poetry, dance, art, theater and opera representing a rainbow of cultural traditions. Admission to all events was free. The 2015 program continued the Festival's multi-cultural tradition, with performances ranging from Italian opera to Mexican mariachi, Celtic to cumbia, country to jazz, middle eastern Ghawazi dancers,” hip-hoppers and folkloric dancers, poets and puppets. The three-day festival took place on a variety of sites: § Friday, June 5, Mariachi Plaza in Boyle Heights, 4:00pm–8:00pm (in cooperation with the Boyle Heights Farmers Market). Music, dance, poetry and theater. § Saturday, June 6, Historic Southwest Museum in Mount Washington, 10:00am–4:00pm (in partnership with the Arroyo Arts Collective). Art exhibits, a tribute to the late artist, mentor and printmaker Richard Duardo, poetry and music. § Saturday, June 6, York Park in Highland Park, 2:00pm–6:00pm. Opera, dance, jazz and rock music. § Sunday, June 7: Lummis Home in Montecito Heights, 10:30 am–5:00pm: Poetry, music, crafts exhibits. § Sunday, June 7: Historic Southwest Museum in Mt Washington, 12:noon-5:00pm: Art exhibits, music. § Sunday, June 7 Sycamore Grove Park in Sycamore Grove/Highland Park., 12 noon-7:00 pm. Music, dance, puppets, storytelling and other family activities.

== Other past events ==
The festival was organized by activists and neighborhood council representatives in 2006 as a celebration the history and diversity of the Northeast Los Angeles communities (the neighborhoods of Highland Park, Eagle Rock, Cypress Park, Mount Washington, Montecito Heights, Sycamore Grove, Lincoln Heights, and Glassell Park) and was designed to strengthen the ties among community's cultural, commercial and community resources.

Since 2006, the Lummis Day program has grown in size and stature and now includes an educational program for Los Angeles teachers, a series of poetry readings and workshops that are held in public library branches throughout the area, and annual same-day events at three separate locations: a poetry reading and music recital at Lummis Home; a festival of music and dance performances at Sycamore Grove Park; and an annual art exhibition held at the Autry National Center's Casa de Adobe.

Since 2006, the principal Lummis Day event has been held on the first Sunday in June. The first event, on Sunday, June 4, 2006, featured East L.A. rock band Quinto Sol, musician Severin Browne, Ann Likes Red, Cuban-born musician Juan Carlos Formell, Danza Azteca Cuahtlehuanitl, the Tongva-Gabrielino Native American Dancers, Pilipino folk ensemble Panama Rondalla and poets B. H. Fairchild, William Archila and Suzanne Lummis.

In 2007, Lummis Day performers included Quetzal, Ollin, the Evangenitals, the Greger Walnum Blues Band, the Susie Hansen Latin Band, Likas Pilipinas Folk Arts, Ballet Coco Folklorico, Rene and His Marionettes, poets Lynne Thompson, Charles Harper Webb, Steve Abee and cellist Kevin Buck.

The 2008 Lummis Day event took place on June 1 and was headlined by Highland Park native son Jackson Browne. Other performers included the celebrated comedy ensemble Culture Clash, Latina fusion rocker Cava, the Chapin Sisters, the Mariachi Divas de Cindy Shea, Artichoke, Ann Likes Red with guest star L.A. City Council President Eric Garcetti, poets Steve Kowit, liz gonzalez, Cathie Sandstrom and guitarist Carlos Guitarlos, the “I Tell Stories” troupe of actors and storytellers, the Cypress Park Folkloric dancers, Ballet Coco and the Puppets and Players Little Theatre.

The same year, the Lummis Day organizing committee formed a California corporation, the Lummis Day Community Foundation, Inc. and was granted federal non-profit status as a 501(c)(3) organization.

Media sponsors for Lummis Day include TV stations KMEX and KTTV, public radio station KPFK and the Arroyo Seco Journal. The Annenberg Foundation, the Autry National Center and the Northeast L.A. neighborhood councils (the Arroyo Seco Neighborhood Council, the Historic Highland Park Neighborhood Council, the Eagle Rock neighborhood Council and the Greater Cypress Park Neighborhood Council) and community organizations The Highland Park Historic Trust and the Mount Washington Association help underwrite the event.

=== 2013 ===
The eighth annual Lummis Day Festival was held on June 2, 2013. Los Angeles rock heroes Ollin, folk legend Jim Kweskin with the Crockett Sisters and gospel belters Little Faith led a lineup of music, dance and poetry representing a rainbow of cultural traditions.

The main stages for Lummis Day's performances were located at Heritage Square Museum, where the best of home-grown Northeast L.A. music, dance, food and community resources was presented on four stages amid the historic buildings preserved on the unique museum's grounds. The diverse styles and traditions of the festival's music ( featuring 17 bands) included rock music from Boyle Heights and Japan, Cuban jazz, folk, mariachi, Americana, Gospel, indie rock, reggae and jazz. Dance groups presented modern dance, folkloric, American historic and flamenco traditions. Some of the historic buildings at Heritage Square Museum were available to festival-goers via docent-led tours.

The Festival's opening morning event took place at Lummis Home beginning at 10:30 AM with readings by critically acclaimed poets, led by Suzanne Lummis and including Luis J. Rodriguez, Erika Ayón and Sung Yi, preceded by a musical interlude performed by jazz guitarist Joe Calderon. A collaboration between guitarist Calderon and the dramatic readings of Luis J. Rodriguez were particularly well-received, as was the annual guest reading by former State Assemblymember (and current State Senate Candidate) Anthony Portantino.

The Lummis Home site also featured art exhibits, book sales and crafts. The Festival's art exhibit continued at Lummis Home until 5pm while performances—music, dance, puppet theatre—as well as community and family activities shifted to nearby Heritage Square Museum, beginning at noon. Visitors to Lummis Home also toured enjoy the interior of the century-old home, influenced by mission architecture and Pueblo Indian dwellings, and many guests strolled through the beautiful native plant gardens that surround the building.

In addition to Ollin, Kweskin and Little Faith, musical performers at Heritage Square Museum included Tall Men Group (featuring Lummis Day veteran Severin Browne) KoTolan, Many Distant Cities, The Fly By Night Jazz Band featuring Greg Walnum, The Old Round, The Plaza de la Raza Youth Mariachi Ensemble, El Profe, Sueño Eterno, Brian & Nick, The Volcano Police, Pio Pico Middle School Stage Band and Genesee Hall. Dance ensembles included Louise Reichlin / Los Angeles Choreographers & Dancers, Ballet Coco, the Lineage Dance Company's Michelle Kolb and Teya Wolvington, Jessica Pacheco of Flamenco Express and the Yesteryears Dancers. MC's included KPFK radio personality Patrick Perez, actress/comedian Lizzy Redner and radio host Bill Murray.

The Puppets & Players Theatre, a Lummis Day family favorite, returned with their unique brand of children's entertainment. Other family activities included making Tongva/Chumash Clapper Sticks and planting at the Home Depot/Color Spot booth. State and city officials (Los Angeles City Councilmember-elect Gil Cedillo, State Senator Kevin DeLeon and State Assemblymember Jimmy Gomez) attended the event.

Lummis Day sponsors included The Arroyo Seco Neighborhood Council, Historic Highland Park Neighborhood Council, The Eagle Rock Neighborhood Council, L.A. 32 Neighborhood Council, The Lincoln Heights Neighborhood Council, The Greater Cypress Park Neighborhood Council, The Glassell Park Neighborhood Council, The Highland Park Heritage Trust, Council District 1, Council District 14, METRO, The Los Angeles Department of Cultural Affairs, Los Angeles County Arts Commission, PEN Center USA, Poets & Writers Inc. through a grant it has received from the James Irvine Foundation and public radio station KPFK 90.7 KPFK

=== 2009 ===
The fourth annual event, held June 7, 2009, featured a diverse collection of performers, including Wil-Dog Abers (a member of the famed Los Angeles band Ozomatli) with his group "La Banda Juvenil"; perennial Best Los Angeles Country Band-winners I See Hawks in L.A.; virtuoso blues guitarist legend Carlos Guitarlos and his band; poet and journalist Rubén Martínez; poets Gail Wronsky and Suzanne Lummis; members of Chicano comedy and theater troupe Culture Clash; Native American singer Glen Ahhaitty; and Filipino, Native American, Mexican and Pacific Islander folk artists and visual artists of various stripes and traditions. The 2009 event was the last to be held at Sycamore Grove Park. In 2010, Lummis Day's main stages moved to nearby Heritage Square Museum (3800 Homer Street). The Festival's morning poetry event remains anchored at Lummis Home, a.k.a. El Alisal, 200 East Avenue 43, Los Angeles.
