= Charles Amadon Moody =

American journalist

Charles Amadon Moody (January 18, 1863 - November 15, 1910) was an American author and book reviewer. He co-edited Out West with Charles Fletcher Lummis for several years in the 1900s.

Moody was the son of Lucius W. Moody and Mary Blair Moody. He grew up in Binghamton, New York and graduated from the University of Rochester in 1881, and worked as a newspaper editor. Due to poor health, he moved to Denver in 1888. He moved back to New York after suffering financial losses in the Panic of 1891, but later relocated to California. He was hired on by Out West in early 1900. Moody was also a participant in various good government movements in Los Angeles and San Francisco.

His ashes are buried in Spring Forest Cemetery in Binghamton.
