= Dr. Mary B. Moody House =

Historic house in Connecticut, United States

- U.S. National Register of Historic Places
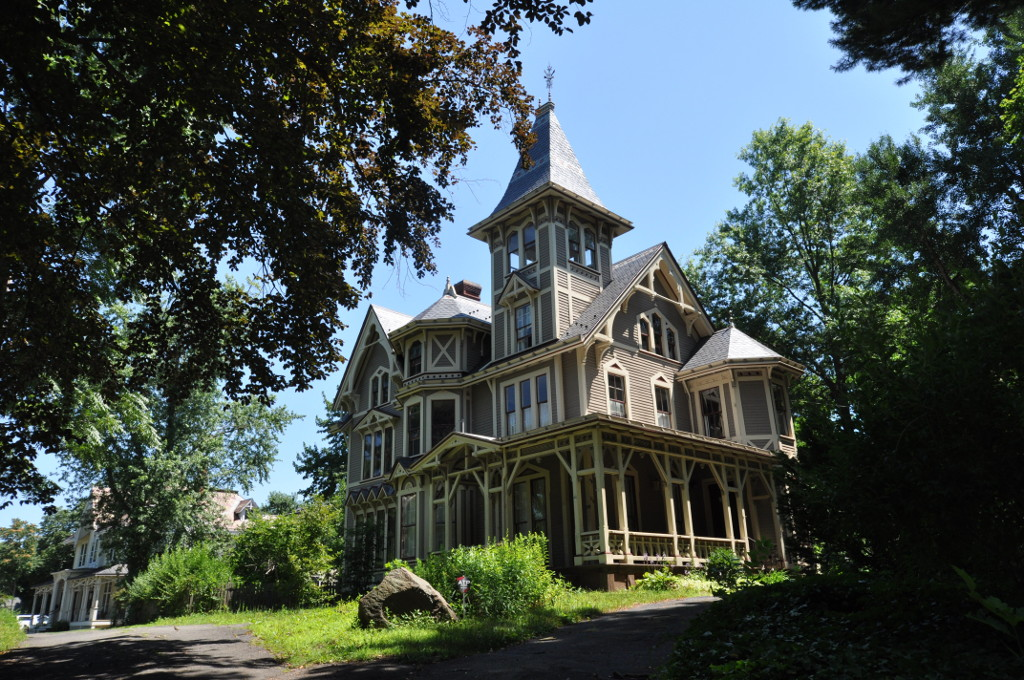

- Location within Connecticut Location within the United States
- Location: 154 East Grand Avenue, New Haven, Connecticut
- Coordinates: 41.306778°N 72.881734°W
- Area: 2.4 acres (0.97 ha)
- Built: 1875
- Architectural style: Carpenter Gothic
- NRHP reference No.: 100000930
- Added to NRHP: May 1, 2017

The Dr. Mary B. Moody House, also known as Chetstone, is a historic house at 154 East Grand Avenue in New Haven, Connecticut. Built in 1875, it is one of the city's finest examples of residential Carpenter Gothic architecture, and was home to Dr. Mary Blair Moody, one of the first female physicians to practice in the city. The house was listed on the National Register of Historic Places in 2017.

== Description and history ==
The Dr. Mary B. Moody House is located in New Haven's eastern Fair Haven Heights neighborhood, on the north side of East Grand Avenue near the top of the eponymous high ground. The house is set on less than one acre of land, fringed at the street by a low stone retaining wall with posts at the entrances. The house is a visually rich wood-frame structure, with the irregular massing typical of the Queen Anne period. Dominant features of the 2 1/2-story structure are a three-story tower with a flared pyramidal roof, and a porch that extends across most of the front and one side. Gables are adorned with Stick style elements, and some windows have shallow pointed tops.

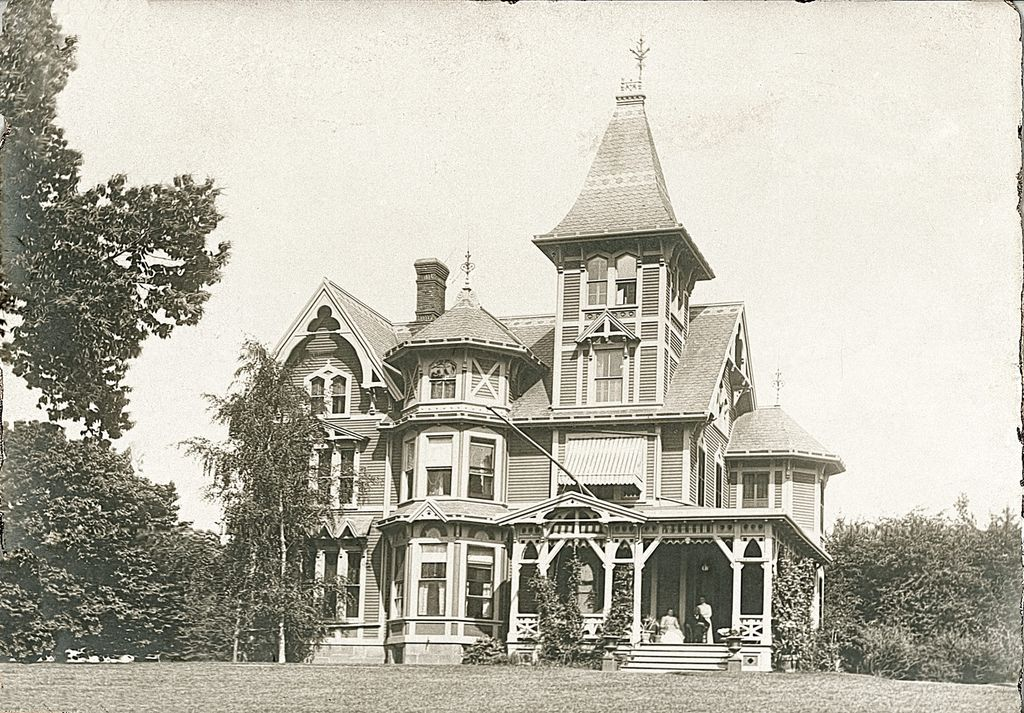
Mary Blair Moody and her husband on the porch of the house.

The house was built in 1875, and was the home of Lucius and Dr. Mary Blair Moody from the 1880s until the early 20th century. Lucius Moody was an insurance executive, and Mary Moody was the first female to attend the University of Buffalo (now SUNY Buffalo) Medical School, graduating in 1876. Contrary to typical Victorian expectations, she then engaged in a career as a physician, while also raising a family. She was one of the first female physicians in New Haven.

The house suffered some wind damage in Hurricane Sandy in 2012, and a Federal disaster relief grant of $150,000 was used to fix the roof and gutters.

== See also ==
- National Register of Historic Places listings in New Haven, Connecticut
- Media related to Dr. Mary B. Moody House at Wikimedia Commons
