= Lummis House =

Historic house in California, United States

- U.S. National Register of Historic Places
- California Historical Landmark No. 531
- Los Angeles Historic-Cultural Monument No. 68
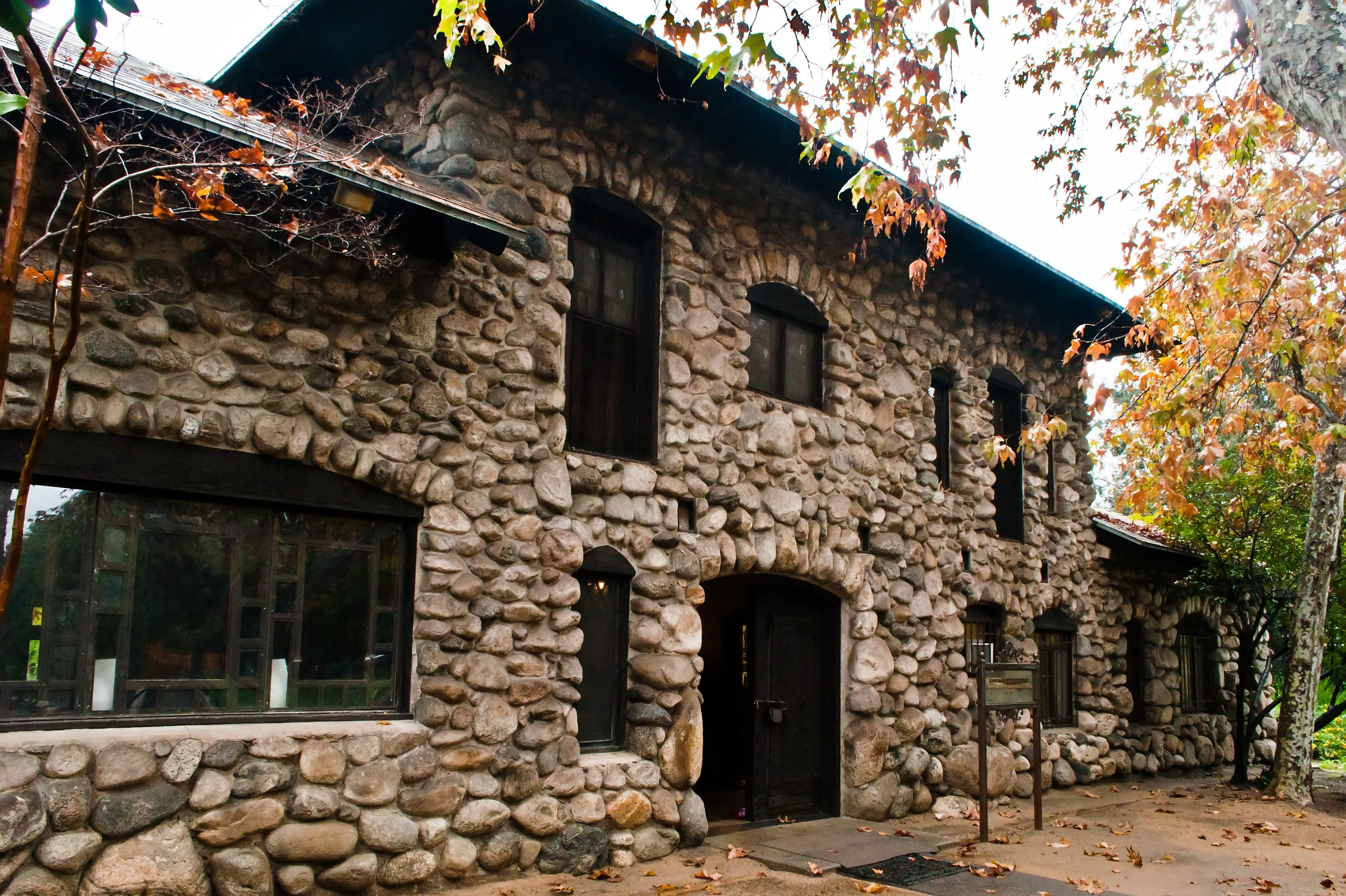
- Lummis House in 2012.

- Location within the Los Angeles metropolitan area Location within California Location within the United States
- Location: 200 E. Ave. 43, Los Angeles, California
- Coordinates: 34.0932°N 118.207°W
- Area: 3 acres (1.2 ha)
- Built: 1897
- Built by: Lummis, Charles F.
- Architectural style: Rustic American Craftsman
- NRHP reference No.: 71000148
- CHISL No.: 531
- LAHCM No.: 68

Significant dates
- Added to NRHP: May 6, 1971
- Designated LAHCM: September 2, 1970

Lummis House, also known as El Alisal, is a Rustic American Craftsman stone house built by Charles Fletcher Lummis in the late 19th and early 20th centuries. Located on the edge of Arroyo Seco in northeast Los Angeles, California, the house's name means "alder grove" in Spanish.

The property is a Los Angeles Historic-Cultural Monument and on the list of the National Register of Historic Places.

== History ==
Lummis purchased the three-acre lot (1.2 ha) sometime between 1895 and 1897 and named it "El Alisal" in tribute to the thicket of alder and sycamore trees that grew in the arroyo. The 4,000-square-foot home (370 m^{2}) took thirteen years to build. The exhibition hall has a concrete floor, making it easier to clean. Notable people who stayed in the guest houses included Clarence Darrow, Will Rogers, John Philip Sousa and John Muir. The property was on the edge of the scenic Arroyo Seco and Lummis founded the Arroyo Seco Foundation in 1905 to promote recreational use and preserve habitat. In 1939, strong consideration was given to creating a theater and Spanish supper room at El Alisal, as this was Lummis's wish. In 1940, the Arroyo Seco Parkway, the first freeway, was built between the house and the newly constructed flood control channel in the arroyo.

In 1965, the house became headquarters for the Historical Society of Southern California and the house was opened to the public. By 2014, the city was concerned that visiting hours were too limited and that the historical group was not truly focused on a partnership with the Parks and Recreation Department. The Historical Society was concerned about the city's expectations that a tenant would invest in the house without committing to a long-term lease. The Historical Society of Southern California left the Lummis House in January 2015. The Lummis House is now operated by the City of Los Angeles Recreation and Parks Department.

== Museum ==
The Lummis House is operated by the city of Los Angeles as a historic house museum. The exterior of the house is built of river rock and originally contained a stone tower, but that was later demolished. The interior contains some of Lummis's collection of artifacts, as well as copies of many of his books. The museum is open to the public for tours.

Gardens

The drought-tolerant and California native plants predominate in the gardens and natural landscape around the residence, including namesake El Alisal California Sycamore trees.

== California Historical Landmark Marker ==
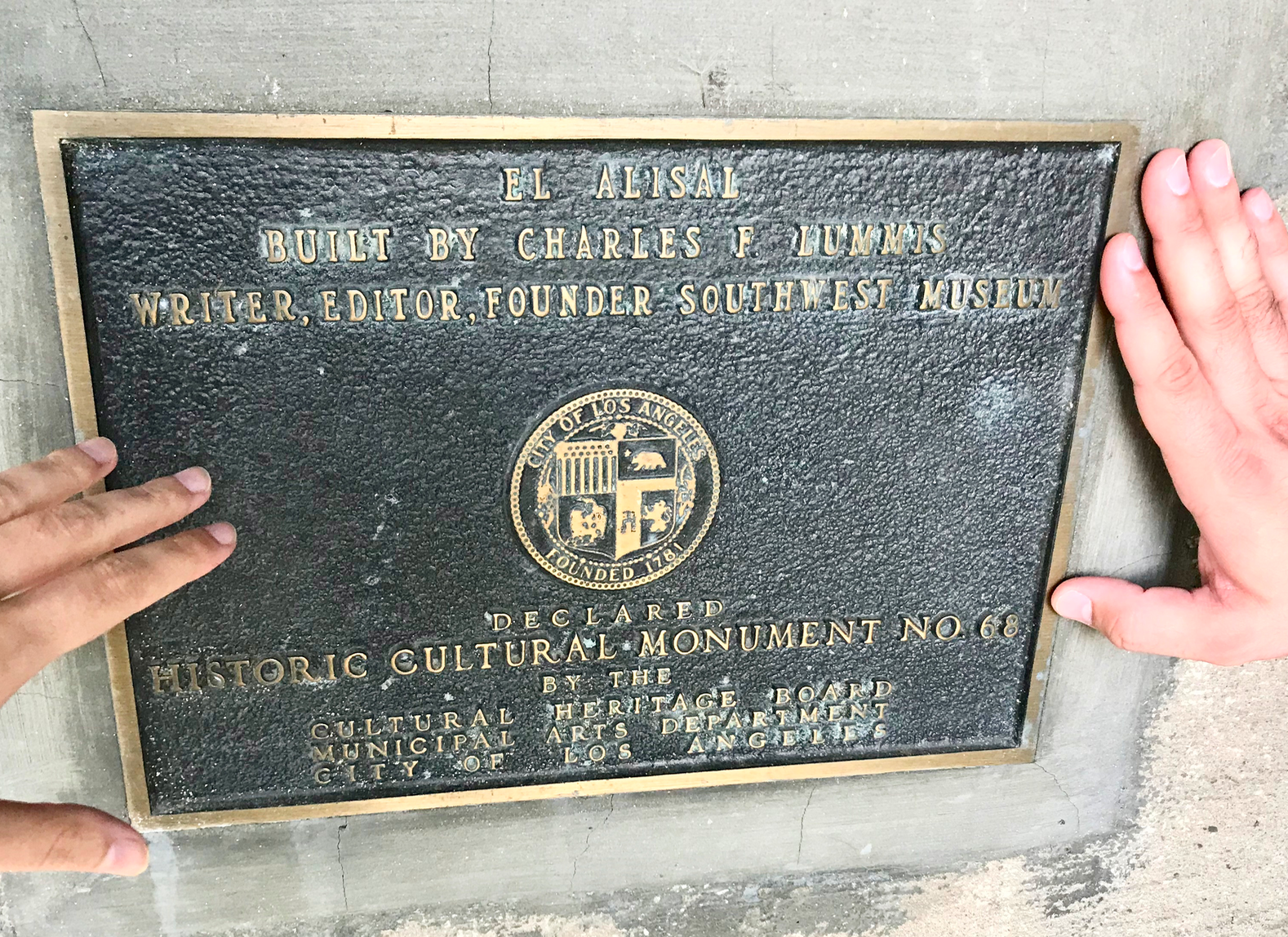
The Lummis House historical landmark plaque.

California Historical Landmark Marker NO. 531 at the site reads:

- NO. 531 LUMMIS HOME - This building was constructed by Charles F. Lummis (1859-1928), author, editor, poet, athlete, librarian, historian, archeologist, etc. He selected this site in 1895 chiefly because of a mammoth, ancient sycamore (El Alisal) which has since died and been replaced by four saplings.

== Gallery ==
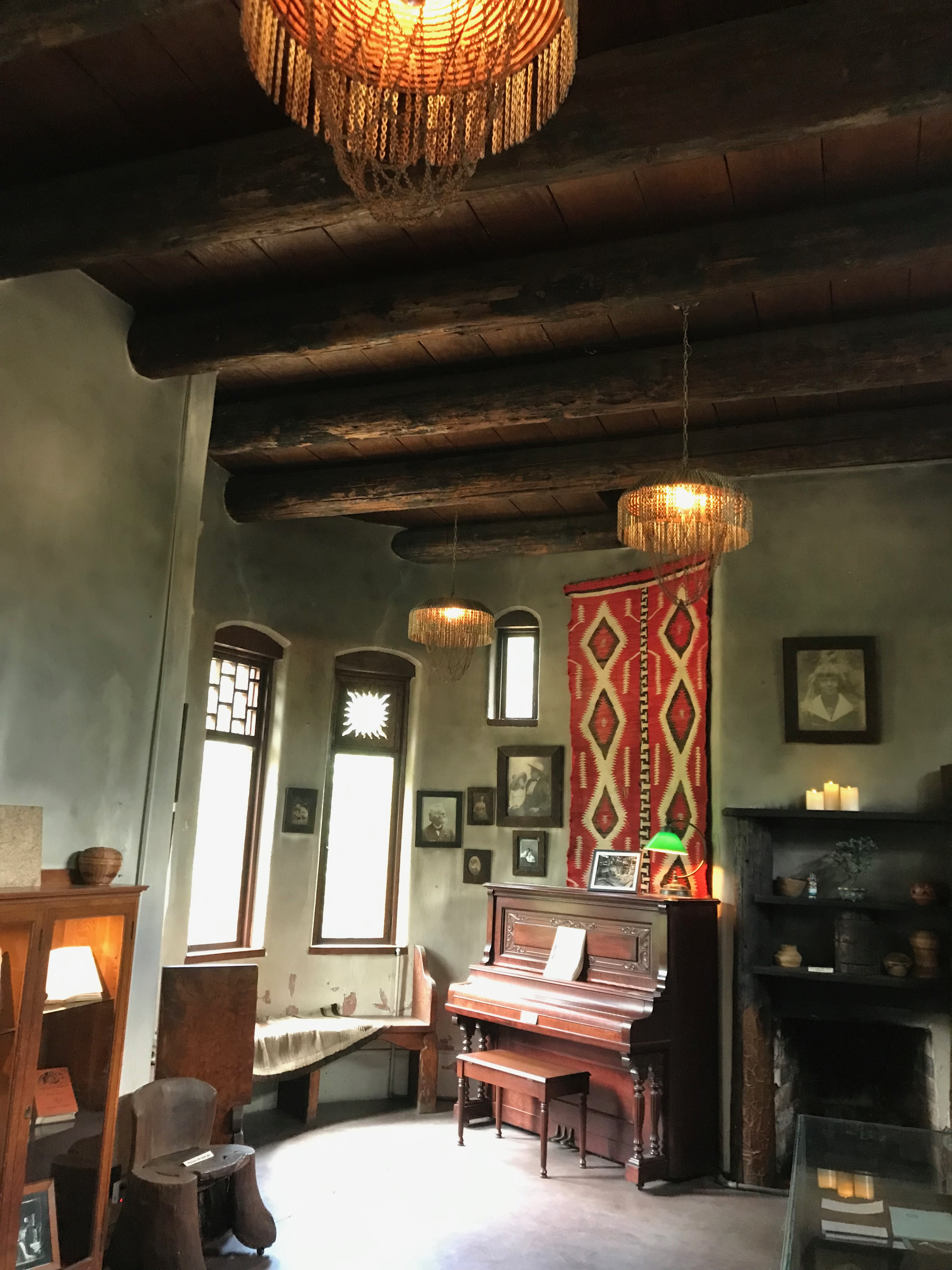
Lummis House living room.

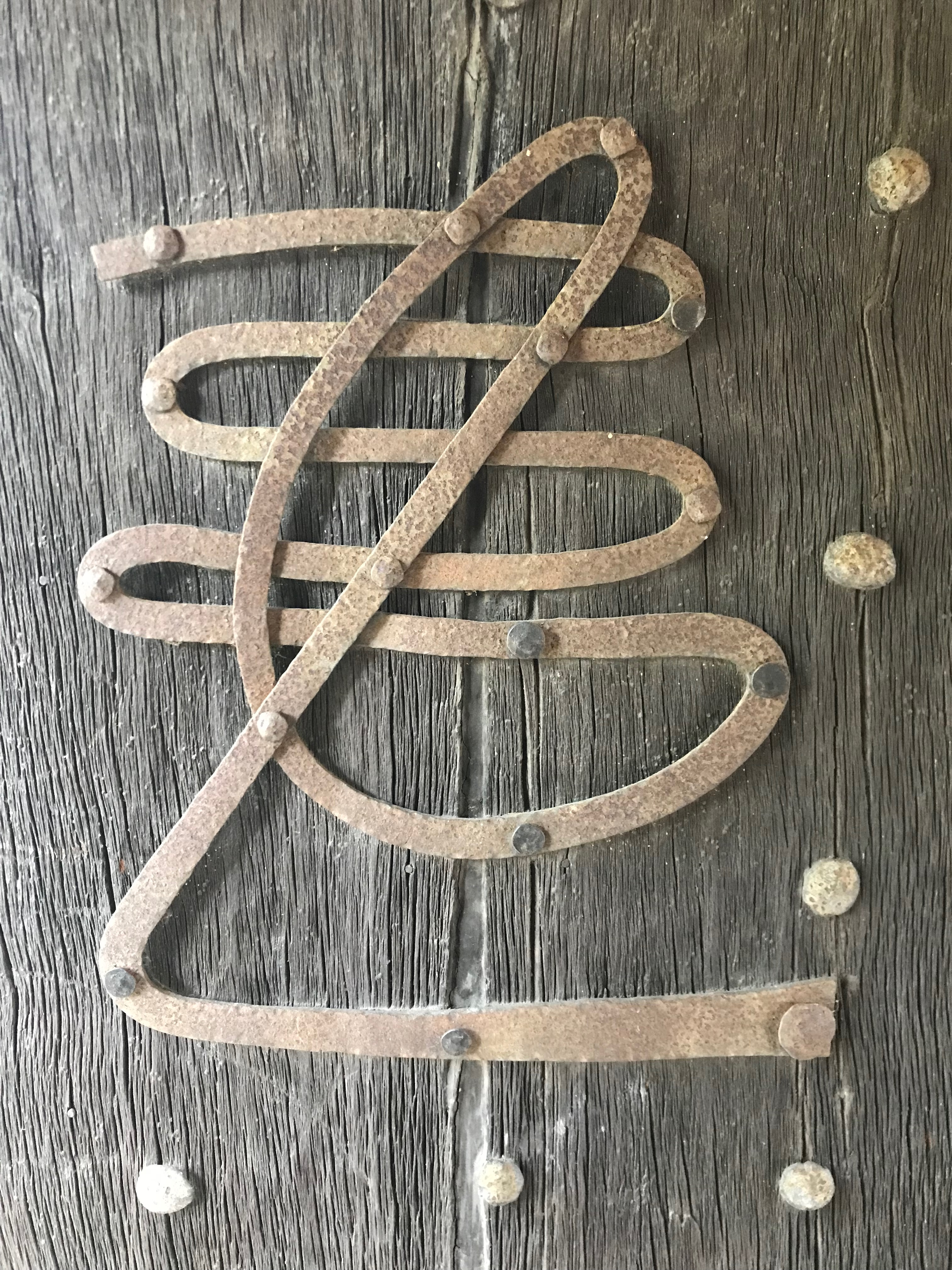
Ironwork on front door.

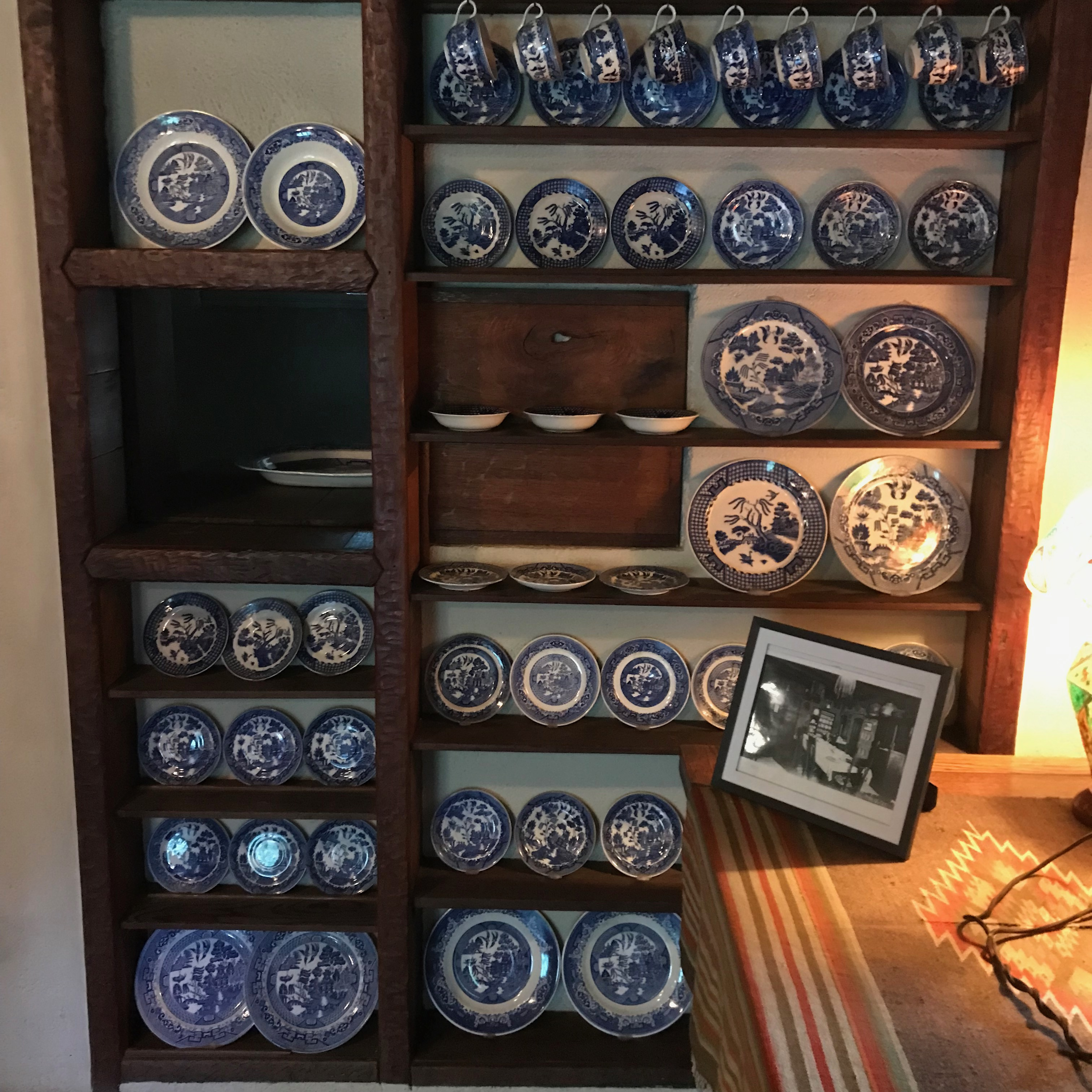
Dish collection at the Lummis House.

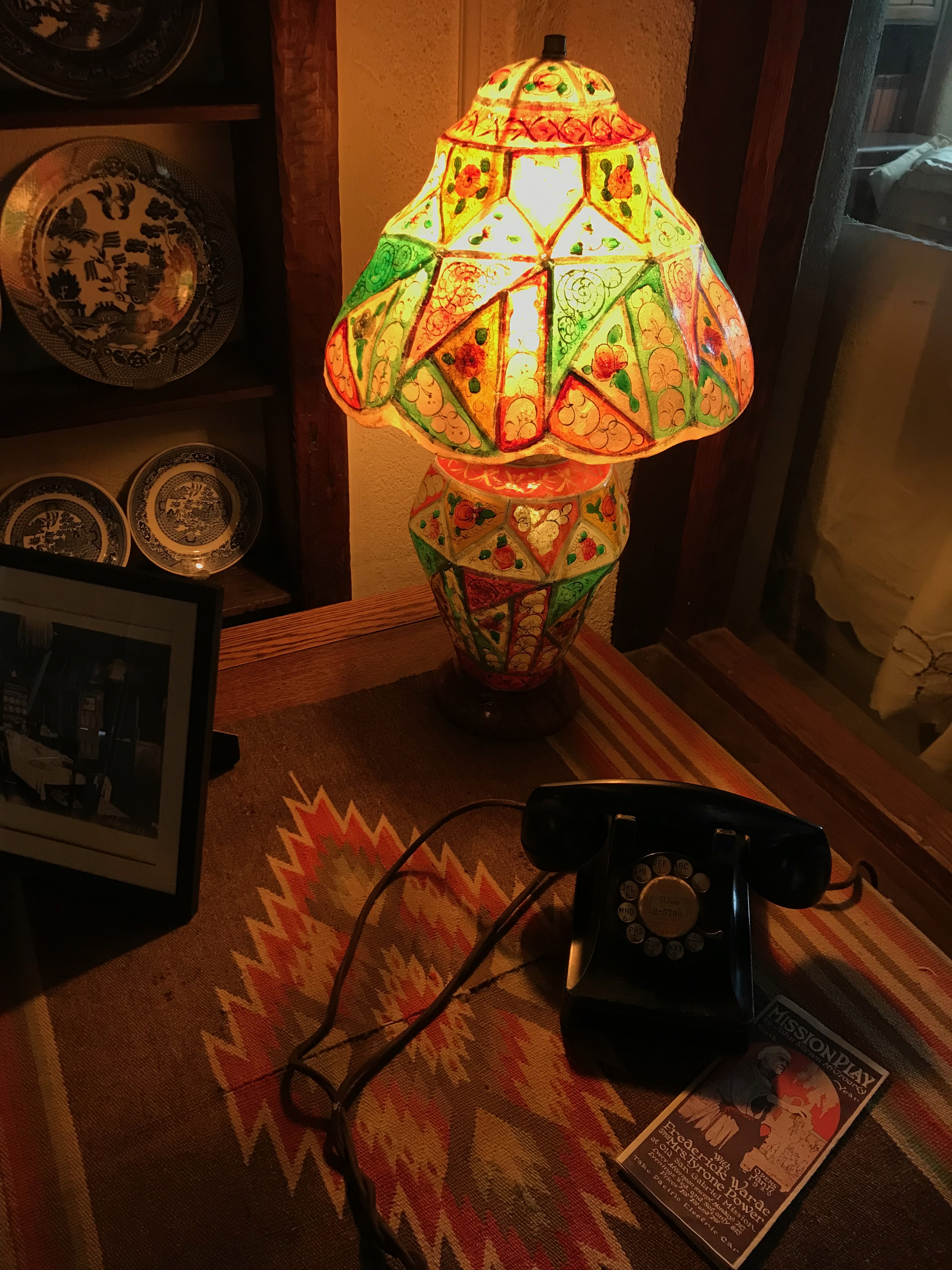
Handpainted lamp at the Lummis House.

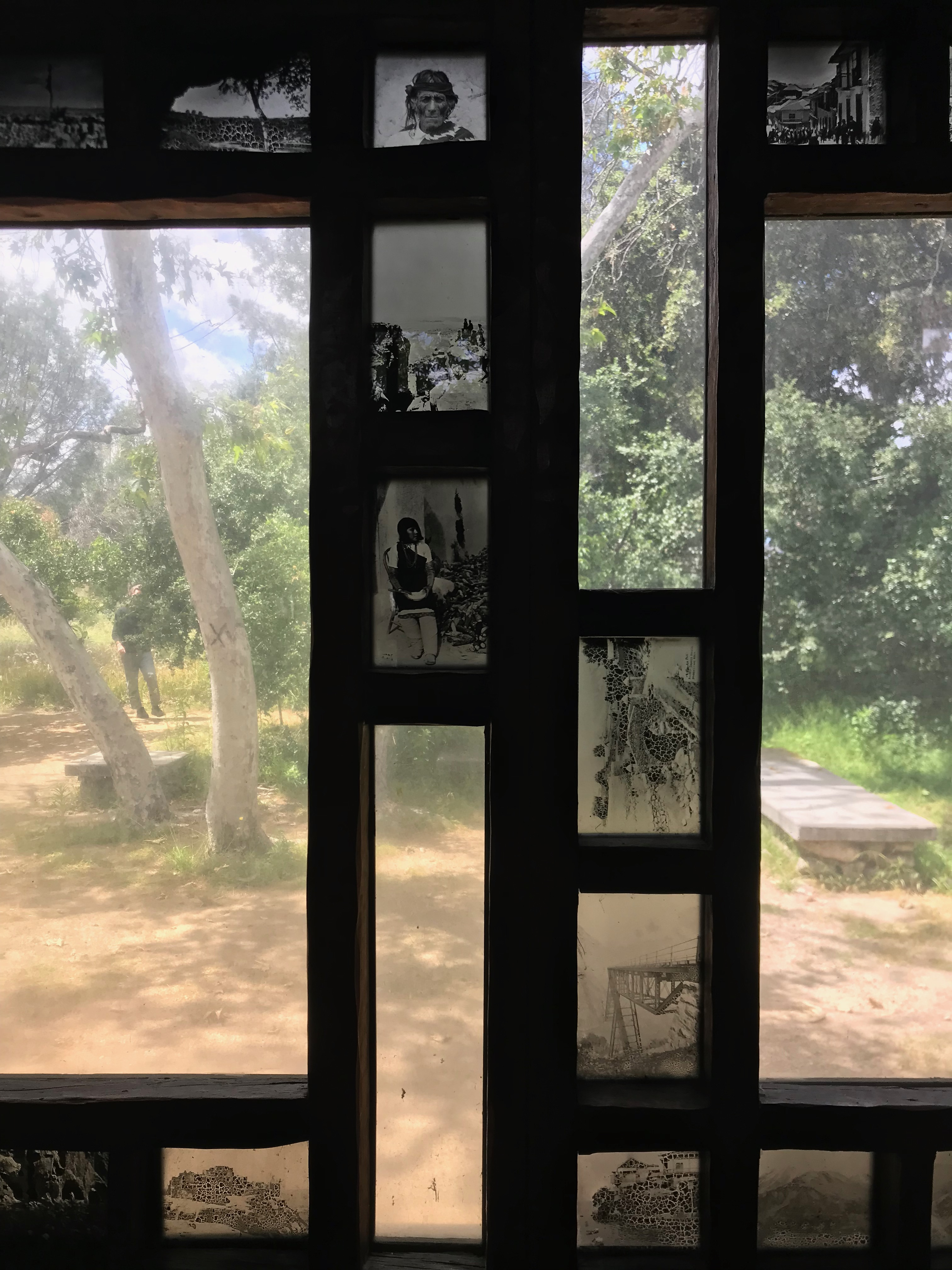
Unusual windows in the Lummis living room.

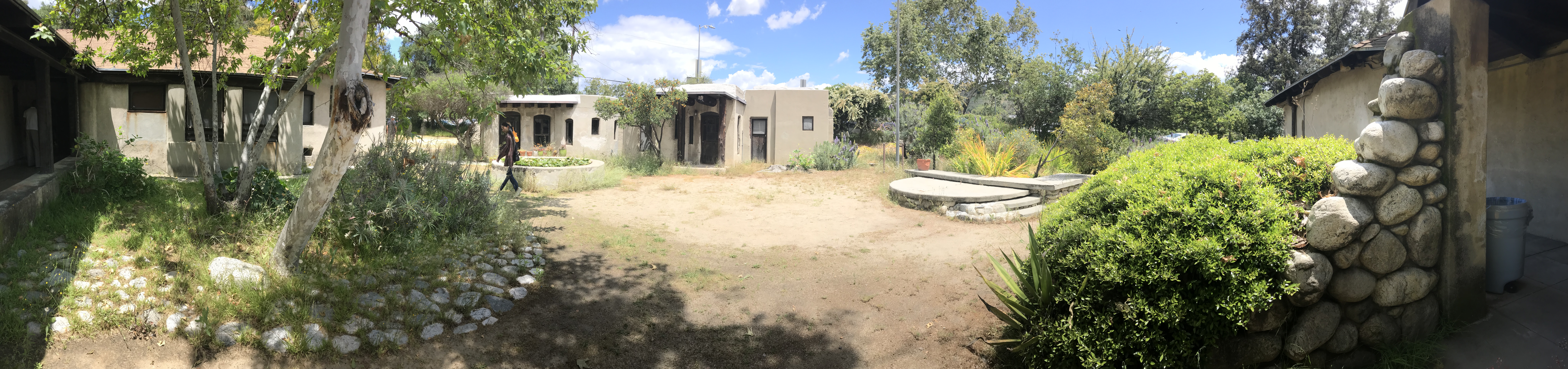
The Lummis courtyard.

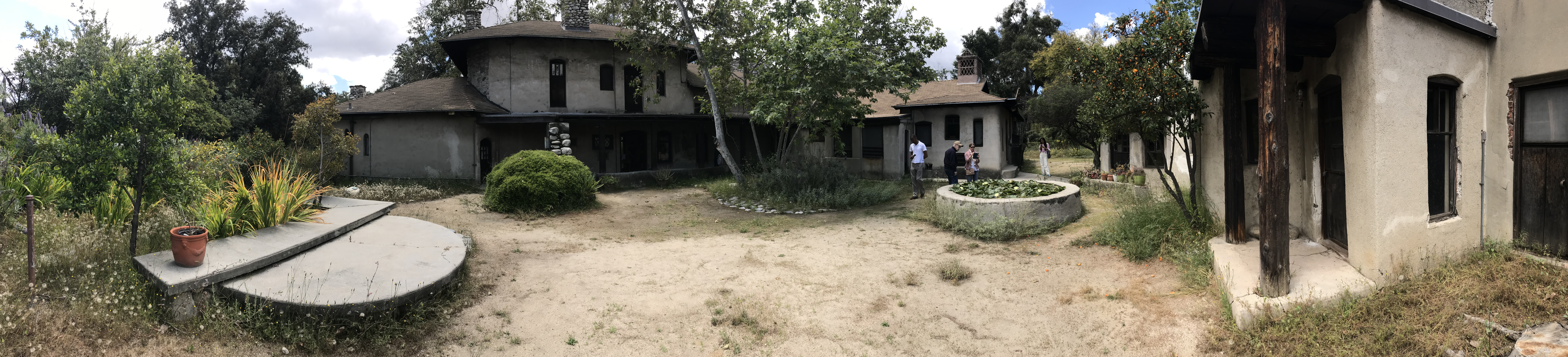
Another angle of the Lummis courtyard.

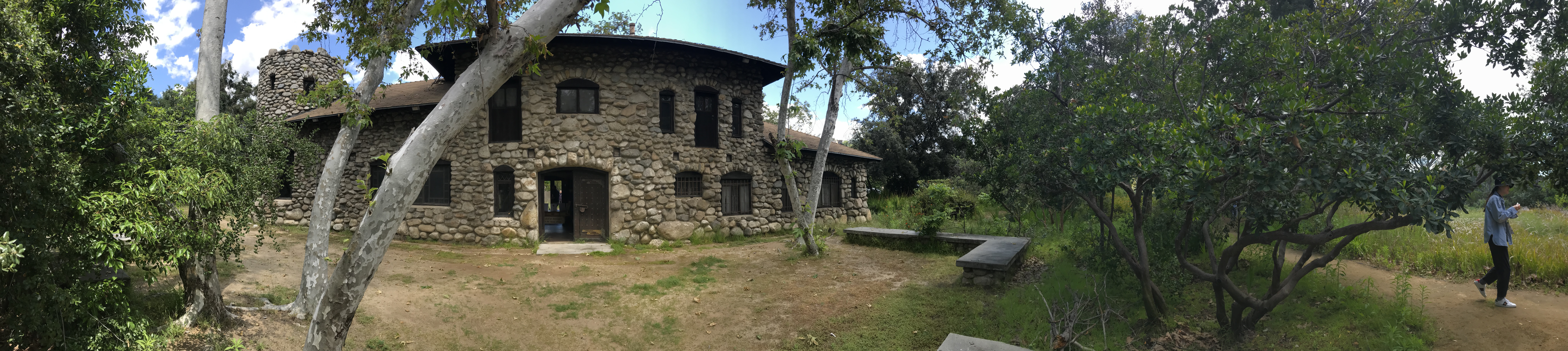
Panorama of the front of the house.

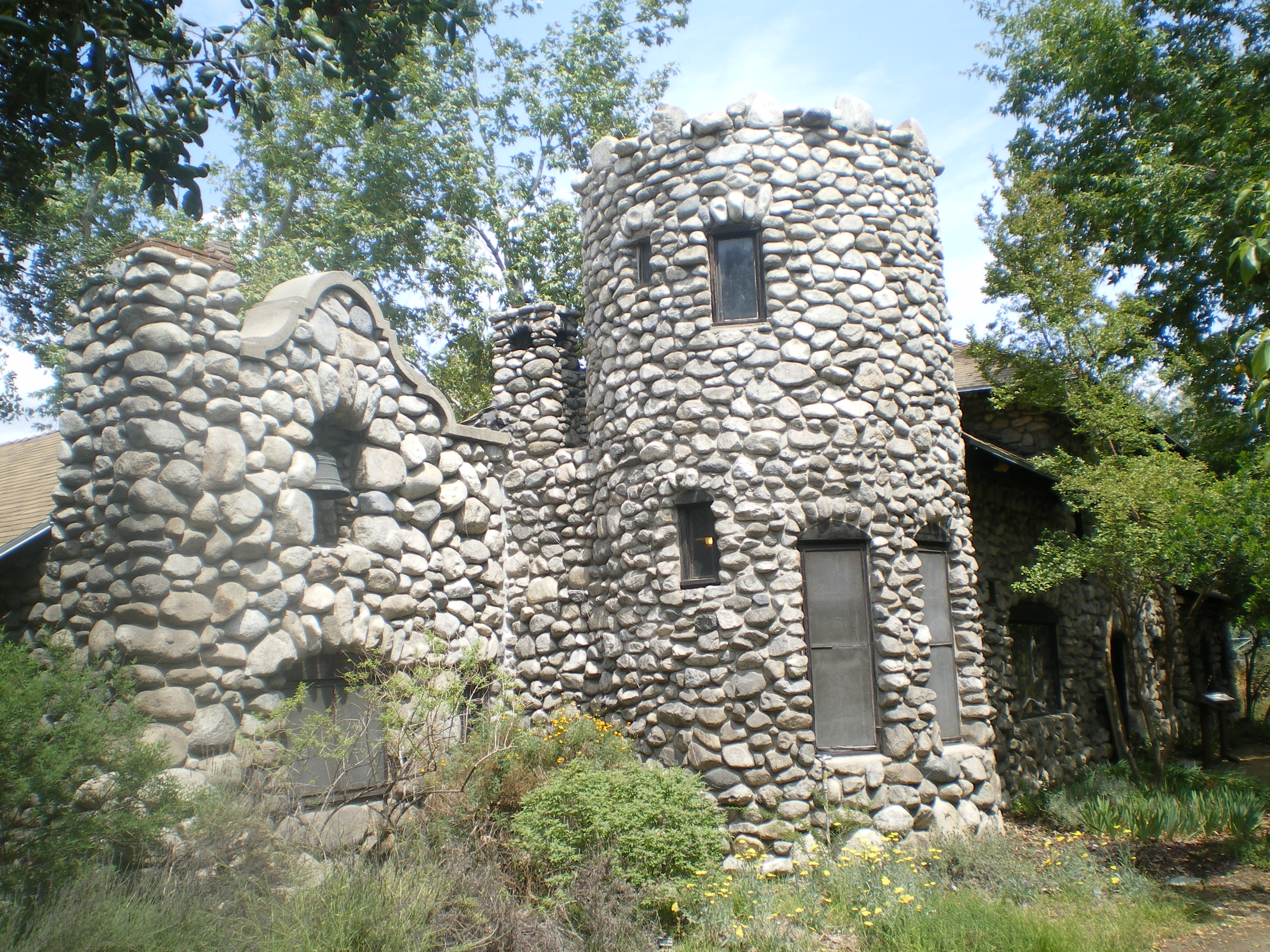
View of the stone facade with the bell.

== See also ==
- Los Angeles Historic-Cultural Monuments on the East and Northeast Sides
- List of Registered Historic Places in Los Angeles
