= Edward Waller Claypole =

American paleontologist (1835–1901)

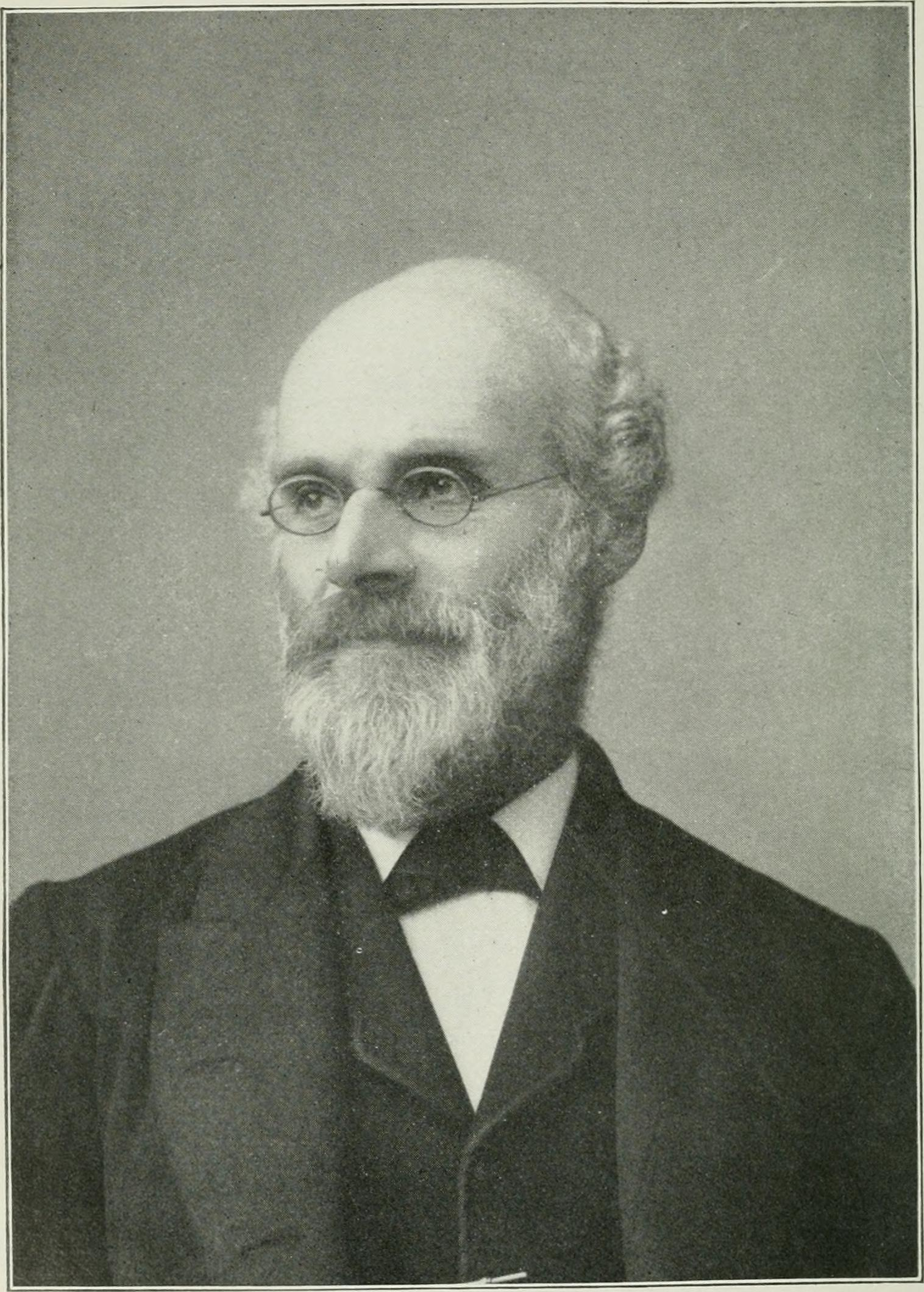
- Born: 1 June 1835; Ross-on-Wye, Herefordshire, England
- Died: 17 August 1901 (aged 66); Long Beach, California, USA
- Education: University of London
- Occupations: Geologist and paleobotanist
- Organization: Geological Society of America
- Spouse(s): Jane Trotter; Katharine Benedicta Trotter Claypole
- Children: Edith Claypole, Agnes Claypole Moody

Edward Waller Claypole (June 1, 1835 – August 17, 1901) was a British American geologist and paleobotanist. Claypole was born in England and educated at the University of London, where he received the degrees of A.B. in 1862, S.B. in 1864, and Sc.D. in 1888. He came to America in 1872 and served as Professor of Natural Sciences in Antioch College, at Yellow Springs, Ohio, from 1873 to 1881. For two years he was paleontologist to the Pennsylvania Geological Survey. From 1883 to 1898 he was Professor of Natural Sciences in Buchtel College at Akron. On account of the failing health of his wife, he resigned this position and sought a southwestern climate. During the last three years of his life he was Professor of Geology and Biology in Throop Polytechnic Institute at Pasadena. California. In 1883, he was elected as a member to the American Philosophical Society. The standard author abbreviation Claypole is used to indicate this person as the author when citing a botanical name.
