= Lannie Haynes Martin =

American journalist

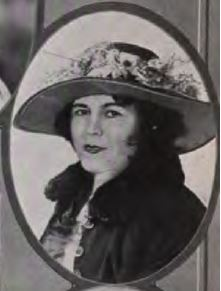
- Lannie Haynes Martin, from a 1922 publication
- Born: Lannie May Haynes; January 9, 1874; Blountville, Tennessee, U.S.
- Died: February 13, 1938 (aged 64); Los Angeles, California, U.S.
- Other name: Lannie May Palmer
- Occupations: Writer, editor

Lannie May Haynes Palmer Martin (January 9, 1874 – February 13, 1938) was an American writer, poet, and editor. She was editor of The Land of Sunshine and Out West magazines in the 1910s.

== Early life and education ==
Martin was born in Blountville, Tennessee, the daughter of William D. Haynes and Margaret H. Haynes. She attended Sullins College in Bristol, Virginia.

== Career ==
Martin was an editor of The Land of Sunshine, and co-edited Out West with Cruse Carriel. She covered the murder of Virginia Rappe for the Hearst newspapers. She was on the staff of the Los Angeles Examiner.

Dozens of Martin's short stories, poems, and essays appeared Out West and Overland Monthly from the 1900s into the 1930s, especially in the issues that she edited in 1916. She also had poetry published in magazines such as Sunset and Munsey's, and in newspapers.

Martin was a member of the Daughters of the American Revolution and the United Daughters of the Confederacy, and was active in women's clubs in Los Angeles.

== Personal life ==
In Tennessee, Lannie Haynes married and divorced her first husband, William Henry Palmer, and had a son, Kyle Dulaney Palmer. She married again in 1900, to Frank Grant Martin. She lived in Altadena, California. She died after a stroke in 1938, at the age of 64, in Los Angeles. Her son was Washington correspondent for the Los Angeles Times from 1919 to 1934.
