= Suzanne Lummis =

American poet

Suzanne Lummis is a poet, influential teacher, arts organizer and impresario in Los Angeles. She is associated with the poem noir, as well as the sensibility for which she is a major exponent–a literary incarnation of performance poetry–the Stand-up Poetry of the 80s and 90s. She is also grouped with “The Fresno Poets.”

== Family background ==
Suzanne Lummis was born in San Francisco and grew up in the Sierra Nevada Mountains.

On her father's side, Suzanne is the granddaughter of Charles Fletcher Lummis, first City Editor of The Los Angeles Times, a position he took on in 1885 after walking across the country from Ohio. He rose to fame as an Indian rights activist, early champion and preservationist of Southern California's Spanish heritage, and author of several books defining and describing the American Southwest. He founded the Southwest Museum, which opened in 1907.

Her parents, Keith Lummis and Hazel McCausland, met in the San Francisco office of the U. S. Secret Service, back when the agency was under the auspices of the U. S. Treasury Department. Keith was a Secret Service agent, and Hazel was the third woman ever to be hired into the office of the Secret Service in the position of secretary.

== Career ==
She received her MA from CSU Fresno, where she studied with Philip Levine, Peter Everwine and Chuck Hanzlicek.

Suzanne Lummis, together with Sherman Pearl, founded The Los Angeles Poetry Festival. Under her directorship the festival produced nine citywide series of readings between 1989 and 2011, culminating with the 25-event citywide series, “Night and the City: L.A. Noir in Poetry, Fiction and Film,” which featured notable authors, scholars and film preservationists such as Robert Polito, James Ellroy, Eddie Muller and Alan Rode, and crime fiction author Gary Phillips, along with many regional poets.

Since 1991, she has taught various levels of poetry workshops through the UCLA Extension Writers’ Program, including special focus classes she developed, “Exploring Other Voices: Writing the Persona Poem,” “The Complete Poet: Vulnerability, Sexuality, Sense of Humor,” “The Art of Craft,” and “Poetry Goes to the Movies: The Poem Noir.”

Lummis's seminal work comingling poetry and film noir has helped to define the poem noir motif—a sensibility that fuses urban grit and urbane wit, and that draws upon film noir's tales of crime and human fallibility but also its striking dialog and starkly beautiful visual compositions. Her defining essay “The Poem Noir, Too Dark to be Depressed” appeared in the Winter 2012-13 issue of New Mexico's Malpais Review, for which she is California correspondent, and she has poems in the 2013 “Noir Issue” of the literary magazine Contrappasso, from Sydney, Australia, the 2014 anthology of crime fiction and noir poems, Noir Riot, published by NoirCon and Gutter Books, and in the "Vers Noir" section of the Knopf anthology, Killer Verse: Poems of Murder and Mayhem, edited by Kurt Brown. In his KCET column showcasing Open 24 Hours under the title “Four Iconic Books in the Landscape of L.A. Letters,” Mike Sonksen dubbed her "a poetic Raymond Chandler."

Her full-length poetry collections include:

Crime Wave: Poems, Giant Claw (Imprint of What Books Press), 2025. Literary Hub included Crime Wave in its 100 Notable Small Press Books of 2025. Reviewer Angela Chaidez Vincent calls this collection, Savvy, robust, and relentless.

Open 24 Hours, which won the 2013 Blue Lynx Prize for Poetry and was published in Fall 2014 by Lynx House Press.

In Danger, California Poetry Series/Heyday Books

Idiosyncrasies, Illuminati Press

Individual poems have appeared in The Antioch Review, Hotel Amerika, The Hudson Review, The New Ohio Review, The New Yorker, and Ploughshares.

Lummis also has a theater background and is a founding and present member of the serio-comic performance troupe Nearly Fatal Women, which has appeared at The Knitting Factory in New York, Knox College in Illinois, Beyond Baroque Literary Arts Center, MOCA in Los Angeles, and various other performance venues.

Lummis' video series on the poem noir, They Write by Night, is produced by Poetry.LA. This series explores film noir and poets influenced by the style and sensibility of those early black and white crime movies. Each episode follows a theme, with titles such as "Damaged Women," "Separating the Dark from the Light," and "Are the Femmes Fatale?"

In his one-thousand word entry on her for The Greenwood Encyclopedia of American Poets and Poetry, literary critic Richard Silberg wrote, “as poet, performer, editor, teacher and poet impresario, Suzanne Lummis has been, for more than two decades, one of the most distinctive and influential poets in Los Angeles.”

== Publications ==
=== Full-length Poetry Collections and Anthologies ===
- Crime Wave: Poems. Giant Claw, Imprint of What Books Press, 2025
- Poetry Goes to the Movies. An Anthology. Pacific Coast Poetry Series, Imprint of Beyond Baroque Books, 2025
- Pratik: Noir Issue, Darkness in Style. An Anthology. Nirala Publications, New Delhi, India, 2024
- Wide Awake: Poets of Los Angeles and Beyond. An Anthology. Pacific Coast Poetry Series, Imprint of Beyond Baroque Books, 2015
- Poetry Mystique: Inside the Contemporary Poetry Workshop. An Anthology. Duende Books, 2015
- Open 24 Hours: Poems. Lynx House Press, Winner 2013 Blue Lynx Prize for Poetry, 2014
- In Danger: Poems. California Poetry Series/Heyday Books, 1999
- Grand Passion: Poets of Los Angeles and Beyond. An Anthology, co-editor Charles Webb. Red Wind Books, 1999
- Idiosyncrasies: Poems. Illuminati, 1984

== Awards and recognition ==
- COLA (City of Los Angeles) Fellowship, 2018-19. This award acknowledges exceptional mid-career artists and writers who have a history of engagement with the city. It comes with an endowment to make possible the creation of a new body of work.
- Beyond Baroque's George Drury Smith Award, honoring the quintessential poets of the City, 2015
- Blue Lynx Poetry Prize from Lynx House Press, for her manuscript Open 24 Hours, 2013
- CSU Fresno Gala Reception Celebrating Appointment of Philip Levine as U.S. Poet Laureate—Suzanne Lummis as an alumnus speaker and presenter, 2012
- Women in Theater's “Red Carpet Award” (recognition for performance and contributions to the performance arena), 2012
- Selected by The National Endowment for the Arts as one of 45 writers to represent the City at the Guadalajara International Book Fair in the year the Fair celebrated the literary legacy of Los Angeles, 2009.
- Beyond Baroque's “Spirit of California Series Spotlights Suzanne Lummis” (“an evening celebrating her contributions as poet, teacher and literary instigator”), 2008
- WriteGirl's “Bold Ink Award” in the award's first year, 2007
- The UCLA Extension Outstanding Instructor Award in Creative Writing, 1996
- Drama-Logue Awards for playwriting, 1987, 1989

== Sources ==
- Visions & Affiliations: A California Literary Time Line Part Two, Pantograph Press, by Jack Foley, 2011
- Hold-Outs: The Los Angeles Poetry Renaissance, 1948-1992 (Contemporary North American Poetry), U of Iowa Press, by Bill Mohr
- Poetry Los Angeles: Reading the Essential Poems of the City, U of Michigan Press, by Lawrence Goldstein, 2014: Introduction, pp 11–17.
