= Agnes Claypole Moody =

American zoologist (1870–1954)

Agnes Mary Claypole Moody
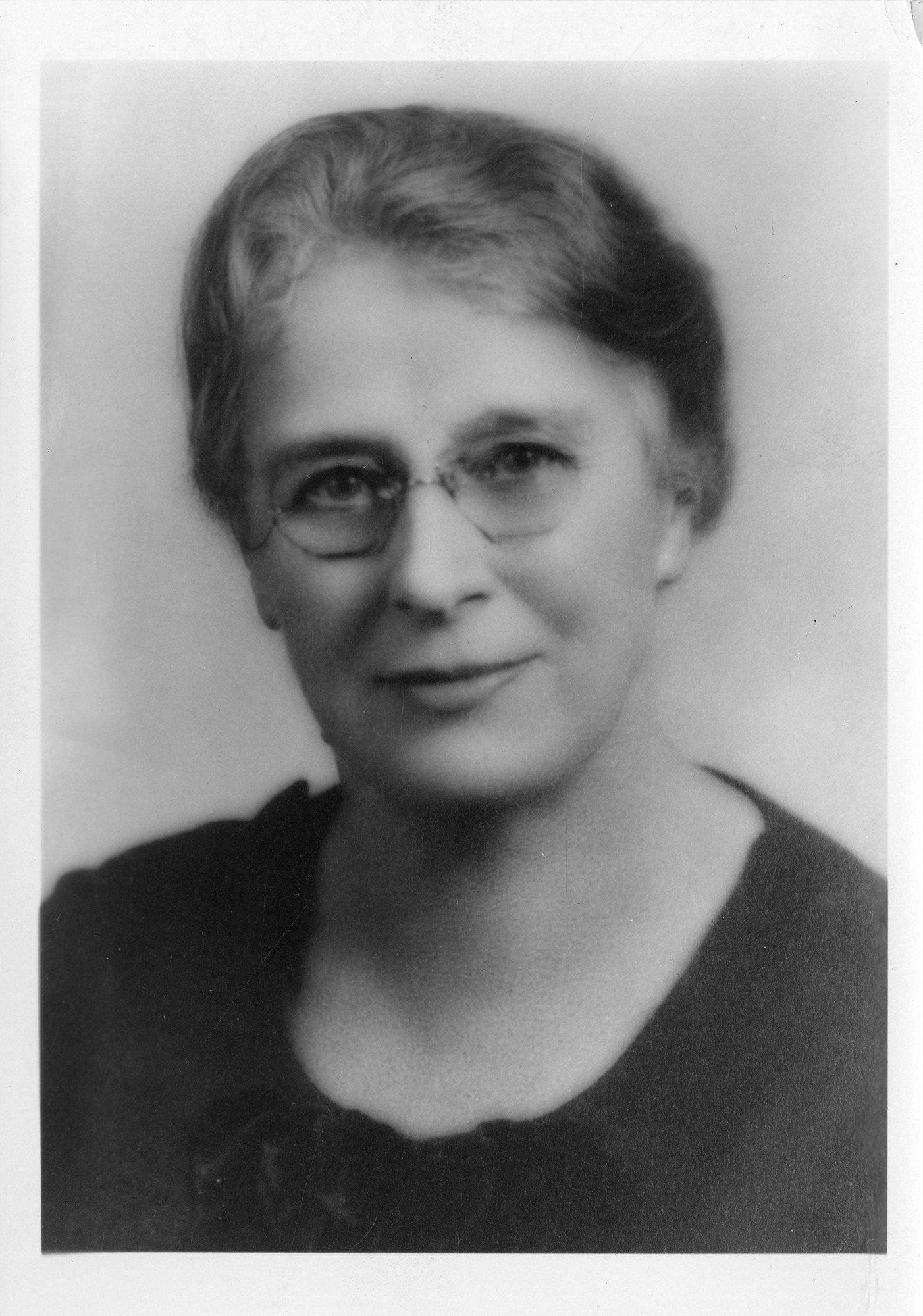
- Born: Agnes Mary Claypole; January 1, 1870; Bristol, England
- Died: August 29, 1954 (aged 84)
- Education: Buchtel College (1892), Cornell University (M.S., 1894)
- Spouse: Dr. Robert O. Moody
- Parent(s): Edward Waller Claypole; Jane Trotter
- Relatives: Edith Claypole (sister)
- Scientific career
- Fields: Zoology
- Theses: The Enteron of the Cayuga Lake Lamprey (1894); The Embryology and Oogenesis of Anurida maritima (1898)

Agnes Mary Claypole Moody (January 1, 1870 – August 29, 1954) was an American zoologist and professor of natural science.

== Early life and education ==
Agnes Mary Claypole Moody was born in Bristol, England to Jane (Trotter) and Edward Waller Claypole. She had a twin sister, Edith Jane Claypole (1870–1915), who was also a biologist. Shortly after their birth, their mother and older brother died. She attended Buchtel College, and in 1894 she attended Cornell University for her master's degree. She completed doctoral work at the University of Chicago in 1896.

For her Master of Science thesis, Moody studied the digestive tract of eels. Her 1896 doctoral dissertation at the University of Chicago was titled "The Embryology and Oögenesis of Anurida maritima." Following completion of her doctorate, Moody served as an assistant at Cornell University despite her PhD, as women were relegated to the lowest ranks of faculty at the time.

== Career ==
Moody was the first woman appointed to a teaching position in the Medical Department of Cornell University.

She worked in various positions at Throop College, (now California Institute of Technology), including as instructor in Zoology, and as professor of natural science and curator (1903–1904). After moving to the northern California area, she was included in the first seven editions of American Men of Science. In these editions, a star was listed along with her name to show she was considered to be one of the top 1,000 scientists that resided in the United States. Moody was a longtime member of the city council in Berkeley, California, from 1923 to 1932. She was also elected to Berkeley's school board, served as chair of the Berkeley Girl Scout Council, and was a member of Berkeley's League of Women Voters. She served a term as president of the Berkeley Civic League, and was appointed to the Berkeley Charities Commission. Of her community work, a local historian in 1928 commented that "No woman of Alameda County has made a deeper impression on the educational and civil life of the community than Mrs. Agnes Claypole Moody." Additionally, she was listed in 'American Men of Science' as one of America's top 1,000 scientists.

There was a Girl Scout camp near Berkeley named Camp Agnes Moody, after Dr. Moody, in the 1930s.

== Personal life ==
Agnes Mary Claypole married Robert Orton Moody (an anatomy professor who was the son of Mary Blair Moody) in 1903 in Pasadena. She was widowed when he died in 1948. She was also twin sister of Edith Jane Claypole (1870–1915, physiologist and pathologist). Agnes Claypole Moody died on August 29, 1954, in Alameda, California.
