= The Land of Sunshine =

Magazine from Los Angeles, California

The Land of Sunshine Out West
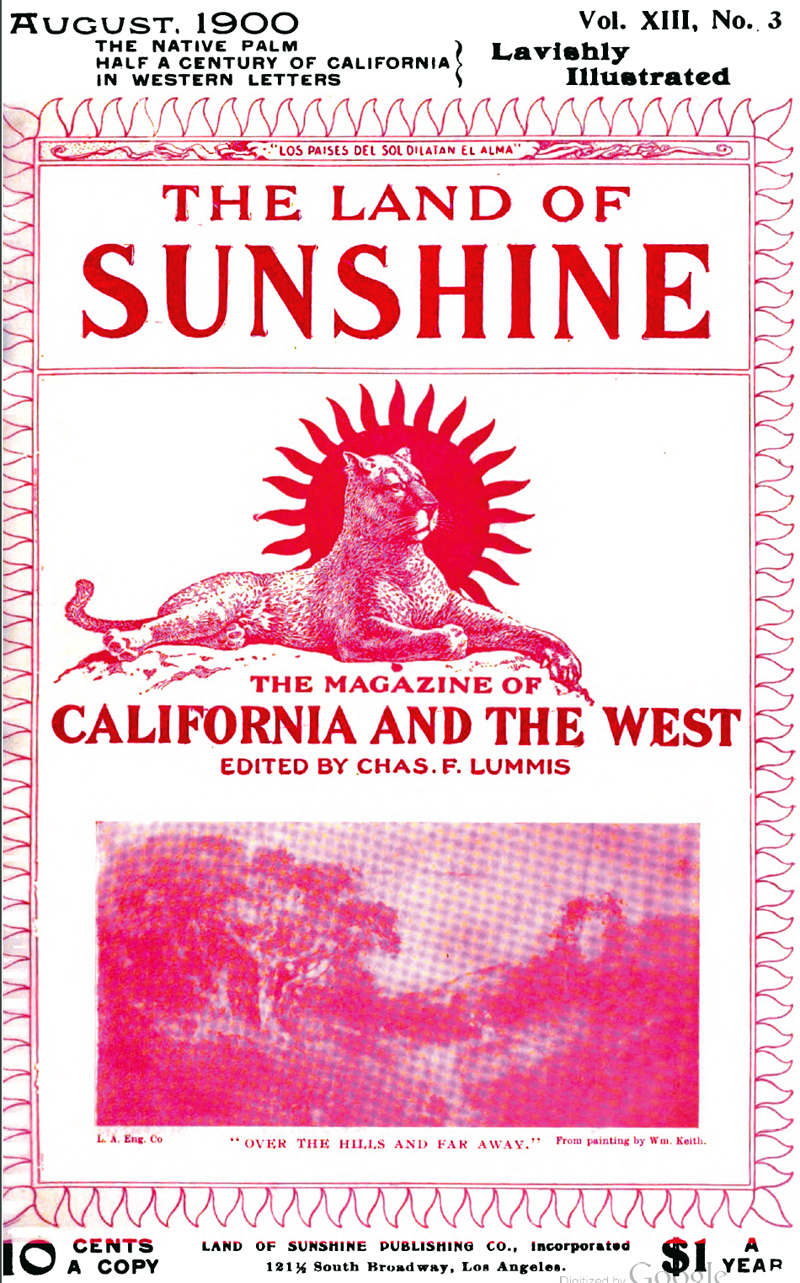
- The cover of the August 1900 issue of The Land of Sunshine
- Former editors: Charles Dwight Willard; Charles Fletcher Lummis; Charles Amadon Moody; C. F. Edholm; George Wharton James; Lannie Haynes Martin
- Frequency: Monthly
- Circulation: 10,766 (1903); 15,000 (1904, est.)
- Founded: 1894
- First issue: June 1894
- Final issue: May 1923 (as Out West); July 1935 (as Overland Monthly and Out West Magazine)
- Country: US
- Based in: Los Angeles, California
- Language: English
- OCLC: 18724654

The Land of Sunshine was a magazine published in Los Angeles, California, between 1894 and 1923. It was renamed Out West in January 1902. In 1923, it merged into Overland Monthly to become Overland Monthly and Out West Magazine, which existed until 1935. The magazine published the work of many notable authors, including John Muir, Jack London, Mary Hunter Austin, Sharlot Hall, Grace Ellery Channing, and Sui Sin Far (Edith Maude Eaton). The Land of Sunshine was also known for its "lavish" use of illustrations, many of which were halftone photoengravings. In the words of Jon Wilkman, the magazine "extolled the wonders of Southern California and had a major influence on the region’s early image and appeal to tourists".

== History ==
The Land of Sunshine was first published by the F. A. Pattee Publishing Company in June 1894 as a quarto measuring 9 by 12 inches (23 cm × 30 cm). It was originally ghost-edited by Charles Dwight Willard, while Harry Ellington Brook and Frank A. Pattee were both also involved in the creation and publication of the magazine. Willard was secretary of the Los Angeles Chamber of Commerce while he edited The Land of Sunshine, which from its inception was supportive of commercial interests in Los Angeles and San Diego to the extent that it would have caused a clear conflict of interest controversy if Willard was publicly linked to the magazine. According to Edwin Bingham, in its first volume The Land of Sunshine developed a long-standing dichotomy between covering regional commerce and culture. From its beginning, the magazine also took concerted measures to increase its circulation, including both imploring its readers to share copies with their friends and supplying public libraries around the United States with issues of the magazine.

At the end of 1894 Charles Fletcher Lummis was publicly named editor of The Land of Sunshine, and the first issue produced under his control was January 1895. Lummis promised that the magazine's coverage of Southern California would be "concise, interesting, expert, accurate" to the extent that it would be trusted by Eastern readers. He also placed an increased emphasis on the cultural and intellectual content of the magazine. According to the Los Angeles Times, he transformed the magazine from a "Chamber of Commerce promotional sheet" into a "sterling literary magazine" in which he voiced his own opinions about everything from art and philosophy to politics and current events. Perhaps his favorite subjects, however, were championing Native American rights and criticizing the Federal Indian Policy. Lummis was regarded as an "impulsive firebrand" as a thinker and a writer, and his ideas, both in The Land of Sunshine and other works, often had a polarizing effect on other writers and academics. In June 1895, the magazine was reduced to dimensions of 6 by 9 inches (15 cm × 23 cm), although its total number of pages grew.

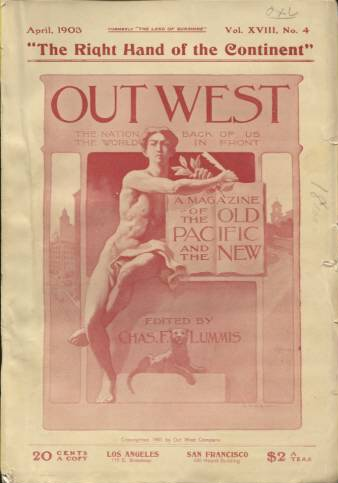
The cover of the April 1903 issue of Out West

In 1898, Lummis expanded the scope of the magazine to include the entire West, which he defined as anything "which is far enough away from the East to be Out from Under". This was accentuated by the magazine's change of name to Out West in January 1902. During his tenure as editor, Lummis maintained relations of various kinds with other periodicals, both in the Western United States and the country at large: this included amicable relations with The Nation and The Dial, an antagonistic relationship with Overland Monthly, and a more complex relationship with The Argonaut, as Lummis lauded the latter's anti-imperialist stance but criticized it for at times being anti-Catholic.

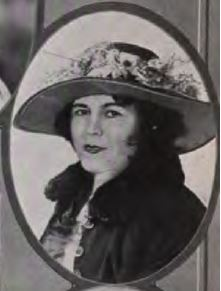
Lannie Haynes Martin, editor of Out West in 1922

Lummis edited the magazine by himself until the February 1903 issue, when he was joined by Charles Amadon Moody: together, they would edit the magazine until Lummis departed in November 1909. According to Bingham, the magazine's influence and reputation as one of the Pacific Coast's premier publications ended with Lummis' departure. Out West subsequently witnessed a succession of editors that included C. F. Edholm, George Wharton James, and Lannie Haynes Martin, and it "ceased to appear with any regularity" after its June 1917 issue. In May 1923, it was consolidated with Overland Monthly to form Overland Monthly and Out West Magazine, which remained in publication until July 1935.

=== Publication and circulation ===
At the beginning of its existence, The Land of Sunshine was printed and bound by Kingsley-Barnes and Neuner Company in the Stimson Building while its photoengraving needs were handled by a variety of local companies. In 1898, the magazine began in-house publication in a building on South Broadway that combined editorial and printing functions, which by late 1901 boasted six job presses and four cylinder presses, one of which was an Optimus cylinder used principally for printing illustrated pages. In April 1904, the printing of the magazine was once again physically separated from its editorial offices, and this arrangement persisted until Lummis departed in 1909.

Initially, The Land of Sunshine was published by the F. A. Pattee Publishing Company, but in August 1895 these duties were assumed by the newly incorporated Land of Sunshine Publishing Co., which at its inception consisted of W.C. Patterson (president), Lummis (vice president), Pattee (secretary and business manager), H.J. Fleishman (treasurer), Charles Cassat Davis (attorney), and Cyrus M. Davis. While Willard initially had the largest individual financial stake in the magazine, Lummis eventually bought him out with financial backing from Phoebe Hearst, the mother of newspaper magnate William Randolph Hearst. Lummis retained his interests in the magazine until his departure from it in 1909.

The Land of Sunshine's circulation reached 9,000 in December 1895, which its publishers claimed was "the largest certified regular circulation of any western monthly". In July 1899, the magazine's average circulation was 9,147. The magazine enjoyed its highest circulation in 1903 (10,766) and 1904 (an estimated 15,000). Measuring the circulation of Out West after 1903 is challenging because the actual figures were not kept or provided to newspaper directories, which resorted to consistently estimating its circulation at between 7,500 and 12,500 after 1904.

In the United States, most of the magazine's subscribers were in California, followed in decreasing order by the Arizona Territory, New York, Massachusetts, and the New Mexico Territory. The Land of Sunshine counted Theodore Roosevelt as one of its subscribers, and he told Lummis that during his Presidency it was the only magazine that he "took time to read". The magazine also had some semblance of an international scope: in January 1907, Out West claimed subscribers in England, Belgium, Italy, Germany, Japan, France, Sweden, Brazil, New Zealand, Mexico, Greece, Siam, and North China.

=== Contributors ===
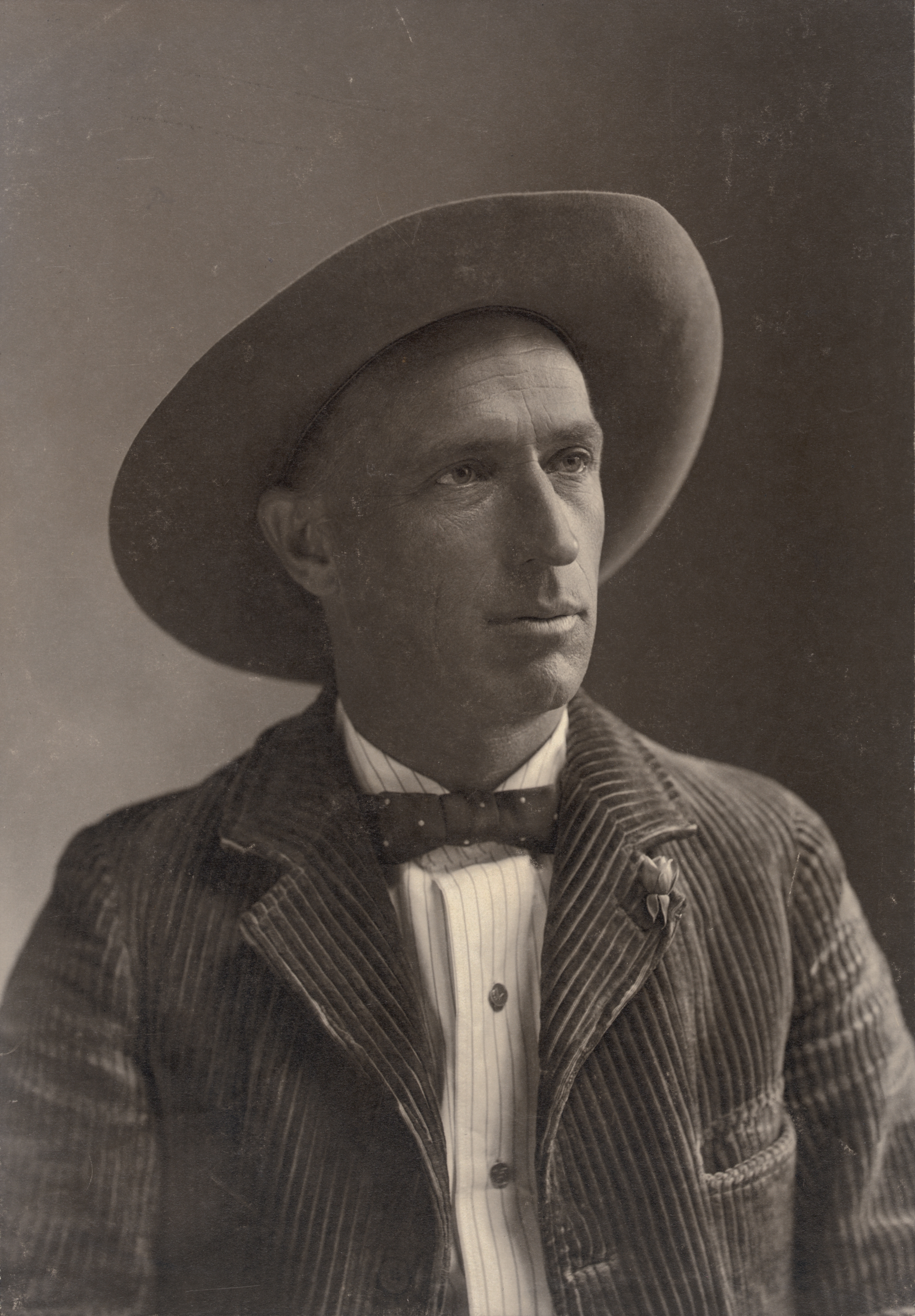
Charles Fletcher Lummis, editor and most frequent contributor in the history of the magazine

Throughout its early existence, The Land of Sunshine had difficulty securing contributions from freelance writers, largely because of its specific focus on Californian and Western themes and its inability to pay standard rates. The issue was so acute when Lummis began editing the magazine that he often contributed a "disproportionate" amount of content, which sometimes resulted in him resorting to contributing under transparent pseudonyms such as C. Arloz and C. R. Lohs, references to his nickname Don Carlos.

In an effort to recruit writers for the magazine, Lummis organized a "syndicate of established writers" interested in writing Western content and paid them with stock certificates in the Land of Sunshine Publishing Co. in lieu of cash payments. Members of this syndicate, which included different types of writers as well as artists, included George Parker Winship, Frederick Webb Hodge, Maynard Dixon, William Keith, Ina Coolbrith, Edwin Markham, Theodore H. Hittell, David Starr Jordan, Ella Higginson, John Vance Cheney, Charles Warren Stoddard, George Hamlin Fitch, Washington Matthews, Charles and Louise Keller, Charlotte Perkins Stetson, Joaquin Miller, Elliott Coues, Eugene Manlove Rhodes, Sharlot Hall, and Mary Hunter Austin. Grace Ellery Channing was also a prominent contributor to The Land of Sunshine.

Over the history of the magazine, Lummis contributed the most content: a total of more than 250 essays, articles, poems, and stories. After him, the next most frequent contributors were William E. Smythe (with 48 total contributions), Sharlot Hall (42), and Julia Boynton Green (23). In addition to writing for the magazine, Lummis also founded two organizations of similar scope and purpose: the Landmarks Club, which was dedicated to preserving the Spanish missions in the region from further deterioration, and the Southwest Society, which ultimately evolved into the Southwest Museum of the American Indian.
