= Edith Claypole =

English-American physiologist and pathologist (1870–1915)

Edith Jane Claypole
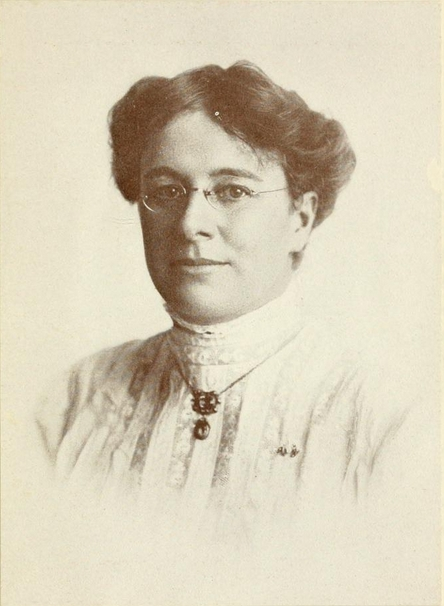
- Born: January 1, 1870; Bristol, England
- Died: March 27, 1915 (aged 45); Berkeley, California
- Education: Buchtel College (B.Phil.); Cornell University (M.S.); University of California, San Francisco (M.D.)
- Parent(s): Edward Waller Claypole; Jane Trotter
- Relatives: Agnes Claypole Moody (sister)
- Scientific career
- Fields: Pathology, immunology, physiology
- Thesis: (1893)

Edith Jane Claypole (January 1, 1870 – March 27, 1915) was an English-American physiologist and pathologist.

== Early life ==
Edith was born in Bristol with her twin sister Agnes Mary. Their mother Jane died soon after and their father, Edward Waller Claypole (a geologist and paleontologist) remarried. The family moved to Akron, Ohio when the girls were nine. Edward and his new wife homeschooled the twins until they entered Buchtel College (now known as the University of Akron).

== Education and career ==
Along with her sister, Edith earned a Bachelor of Philosophy from Buchtel in 1892. She then went on to Cornell University, and wrote her Master of Science thesis on white blood cells in 1893. From 1894 to 1899, Claypole served as a professor of physiology and histology at Wellesley College, and also headed the zoology department for two years. In 1899, she started work in the medical department at Cornell where she stayed until 1901 when she moved to Pasadena to be near her stepmother, who was ill. In 1904, Claypole received her M.D. from the University of California. She specialized in pathology, practicing in Pasadena and Los Angeles for eight years.

In January 1912, Claypole began volunteer work with the department of pathology at the University of California, Berkeley, working under Dr. Frederick Parker Gay, and was later appointed as Research Associate.

== Death ==
On a request from William Osler, Claypole was working on an immunization for typhoid (needed for the armies of World War I). Although she had been vaccinated, her work continuously exposed her to the pathogen, and she eventually succumbed to the disease when it caused a perforated intestine, along with appendicitis.

In her honor, the University of California set up the Edith Claypole Memorial Research Fund in Pathology.
