= Charles Fletcher Lummis =

American journalist (1859–1928)

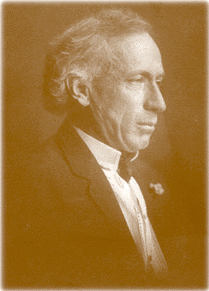
Lummis

Charles Fletcher Lummis (March 1, 1859 – November 25, 1928) was an American journalist, civil rights activist, preservationist, poet and librarian who promoted Native American rights and historic preservation. He founded the Southwest Museum of the American Indian.

Lummis began his career as a printer and wrote poems. He traveled in the American Southwest, and settled in Los Angeles, California, where he became known as a historian, photographer, ethnographer and archaeologist. He worked as a city editor for the Los Angeles Times. After being paralyzed, he lived in a Pueblo Indian village and began promoting Native American rights. Later in his life he was a city librarian at the Los Angeles Public Library.

== Early life and career ==
Lummis was born in 1859, in Lynn, Massachusetts. He lost his mother at age two and was homeschooled by his father, who was a schoolmaster and a Methodist minister. Lummis enrolled in Harvard for college and was a classmate of Theodore Roosevelt, but dropped out during his senior year. While at Harvard he worked during the summer as a printer and published his first work, Birch Bark Poems. This small volume was printed on paper-thin sheets of birch bark; he won recognition from some of the day's leading poets. He sold the books by subscription and used the money to pay for college. A poem from this work, "My Cigarette", highlighted tobacco as one of his life's obsessions.

In 1880, at the age of 21, Lummis married Dorothea Rhodes of Cincinnati, Ohio.

=== Transcontinental walk ===
In 1884, Lummis was working for a newspaper in Cincinnati and was offered a job with the Los Angeles Times. At that time, Los Angeles had a population of only 12,000. Lummis decided to make the 3,507-mile journey from Cincinnati to Los Angeles by foot and send weekly dispatches to the paper chronicling his trip. The trip began in September and lasted through the winter, lasting 143 days. One of his dispatches describing meeting and interviewing famed outlaw Frank James. Lummis suffered a broken arm and struggled in the heavy winter snows of New Mexico. He became enamored with the American Southwest, and its Spanish and Native American inhabitants. Several years later, he published his account of this journey in A Tramp Across the Continent (1892).

=== Editor at the Los Angeles Times ===
Upon his arrival, Lummis was offered the job of the first City Editor of the Los Angeles Times. He covered a multitude of interesting stories from the new and growing community. Work was hard and demanding under the pace set by publisher Harrison Gray Otis. Lummis was happy until he suffered from a mild stroke that left his left side paralyzed.

=== New Mexico ===
In 1888, Lummis moved to San Mateo, New Mexico to recuperate from his paralysis. He rode on the Plains while holding a rifle in one good hand and shooting jack rabbits. Here, he began a new career as a prolific freelance writer, writing on everything that was particularly special about the Southwest and Native American cultures. His articles about corrupt bosses committing murders in San Mateo drew threats on his life, so he moved to a new location in the Pueblo Indian village of Isleta, New Mexico, on the Rio Grande.

=== Pueblo People of Isleta ===
Somewhat recovered from his paralysis, Lummis was able to win over the confidence of the Isleta Pueblo, a Southern Tiwa people, by his outgoing and generous nature. But a hit man from San Mateo was sent up to Isleta, where he shot Lummis but failed to kill him.

In Isleta, Lummis divorced his first wife and married Eva Douglas, who lived in the village and was the sister-in-law of an English trader. Somehow he convinced Eva to stay with Dorothea in Los Angeles until the divorce went through. In the meantime, Lummis became entangled in fights with the U.S. government agents over Native American education. In this period, the government was pushing assimilation and had established Native American boarding schools. It charged its agents with recruiting Native American children for the schools, where they were usually forced to give up traditional clothing and hair styles, and prevented from speaking their own languages or using their own customs. They were often prohibited from returning home during holidays or vacation periods, or their families were too poor to afford such travel. Lummis persuaded the government to allow 36 children from the Albuquerque Indian School to return to their homes.

While in Isleta, he made friends with Father Anton Docher from France; he was the missionary Padre of Isleta. They both also befriended Adolph Bandelier. While living in Isleta, Lummis boarded in the home of Juan Rey Abeita. In 1890, he traveled with Bandelier to study the indigenous people of the area.

=== Preservationist ===
As president of the Landmarks Club of Southern California (an all-volunteer, privately funded group dedicated to the preservation of California's Spanish missions), Lummis noted that the historic structures "...were falling to ruin with frightful rapidity, their roofs being breached or gone, the adobe walls melting under the winter rains." Lummis wrote in 1895, "In ten years from now—unless our intelligence shall awaken at once—"there will remain of these noble piles nothing but a few indeterminable heaps of adobe. We shall deserve and shall have the contempt of all thoughtful people if we suffer our noble missions to fall."

=== Magazine editor ===
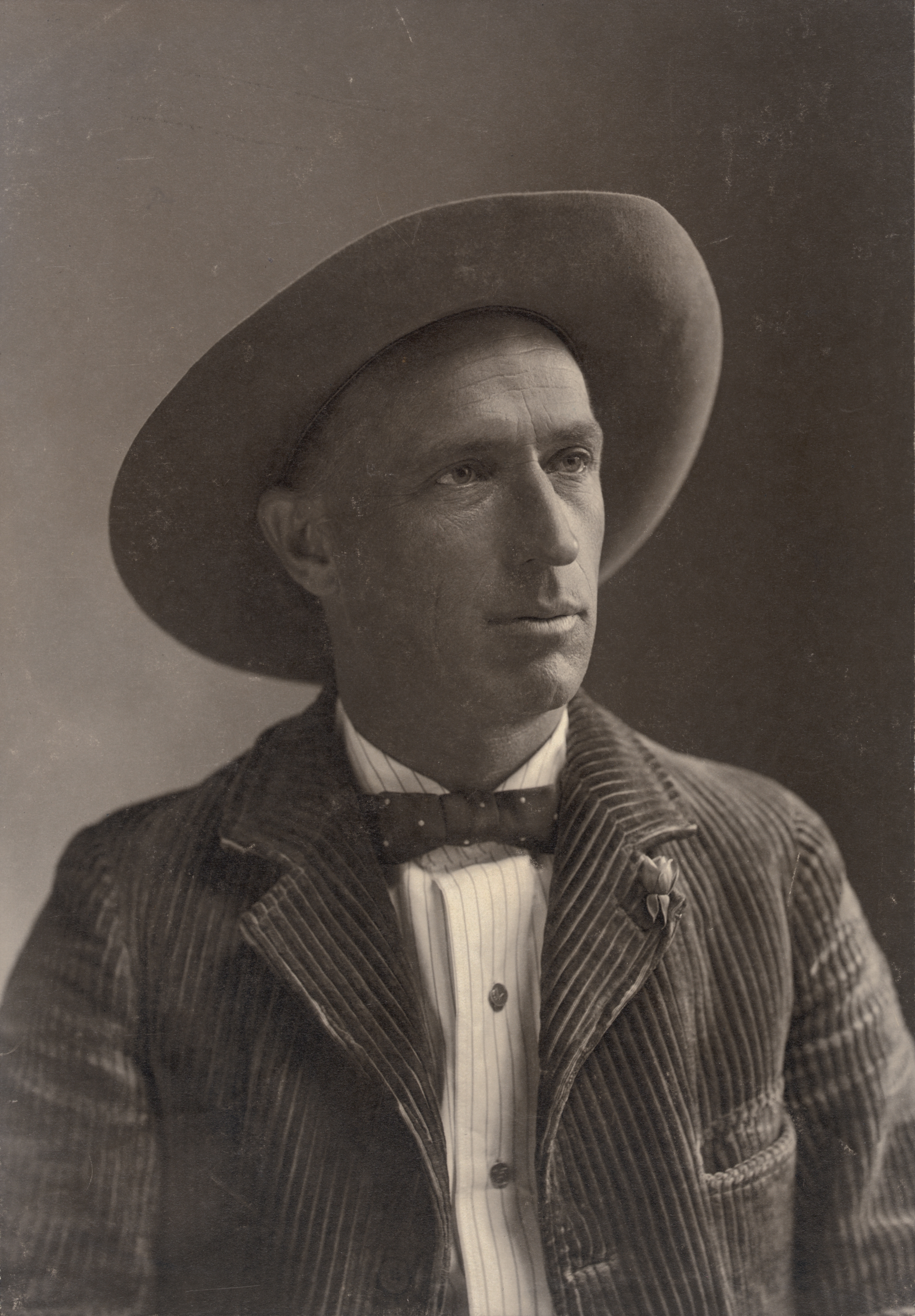
Lummis in 1897

In 1892, Lummis published Some Strange Corners of Our Country, recounting some of the areas and sights he had discovered. Between 1893 and 1894, he spent 10 months traveling in Peru with Bandelier.

After the men's return, Lummis and Eva returned to Los Angeles with their year-old daughter, Turbese. Unemployed, Lummis landed the position of editor of a regional magazine, Land of Sunshine. The magazine was renamed Out West in 1901. He published works by famous authors such as Jack London and John Muir. Over his 11 years as editor, Lummis also wrote more than 500 pieces for the magazine, as well as a popular monthly commentary called "In the Lion's Den".

=== Native American rights activist ===
Lummis also established a new Native American rights group called the "Sequoya League", after the noted early 19th-century Cherokee leader Sequoyah who developed a writing system for the Cherokee language. Lummis fought against the U.S. Bureau of Indian Affairs and called on his classmate President Theodore Roosevelt to help change their manner of operating. He found a home for a small group of Native Americans who had been evicted from their property in the Palm Springs, California area. The Sequoya League began a battle against Indian Agent Charles Burton, accusing him of imposing a "reign of terror" on the Hopi pueblo in Oraibi by requiring Hopi men to cut their long hair. It was their custom to wear it long, a practice with spiritual meaning. Lummis was accused of overstating the case against Burton and lost his welcome at the White House. (However, subsequent social pressure on Burton led him to reverse the haircutting policy.)

== Later life ==
In 1905, Lummis took the position as City Librarian of the Los Angeles Public Library. Lummis replaced Mary Jones as City Librarian even though he had no prior library training. He was criticized for the way he ran the library and insisted on doing most of the work at home. He resigned from that sole source of income in 1911, and worked to establish the Southwest Museum while engaged in a bitter and public divorce with his wife Eva.

In that year Lummis went blind, which he attributed to a "jungle fever" contracted while in Guatemala exploring the Mayan ruins of Quiriguá. After more than a year of blindness, during which he might appear in public with his eyes covered by a bandanna or wearing dark amber glasses, he regained his sight. Some privately doubted Lummis actually went blind. Among them was John Muir, who said so in a letter to him and encouraged him to get more rest.

In 1915, Lummis married his third wife, Gertrude, at El Alisal.

By 1918, he was destitute. In 1923, the Southwest Museum Board named him founder emeritus and gave him a small stipend. In 1925, Lummis also decided to enlarge, revise, and republish Some Strange Corners of Our Country as Mesa, Canyon and Pueblo. He also engaged in a renewed civil rights crusade on behalf of the Pueblo Indians.

== Death ==
Lummis died November 25, 1928, in Los Angeles, California. He was cremated, and his ashes were placed in a vault in a wall at El Alisal. Supporters bought his home El Alisal, which was until 2015 used as the headquarters of the Historical Society of Southern California.

== Legacy and honors ==
Lummis' cultural influence remains today, including a lasting imprint on the Mount Washington neighborhood of Los Angeles. The home he built, the Lummis House, and the museum he founded, the Southwest Museum of the American Indian, are located within 0.7 miles of each other and remain open to the public for limited hours on weekends.

=== El Alisal (Lummis House) ===
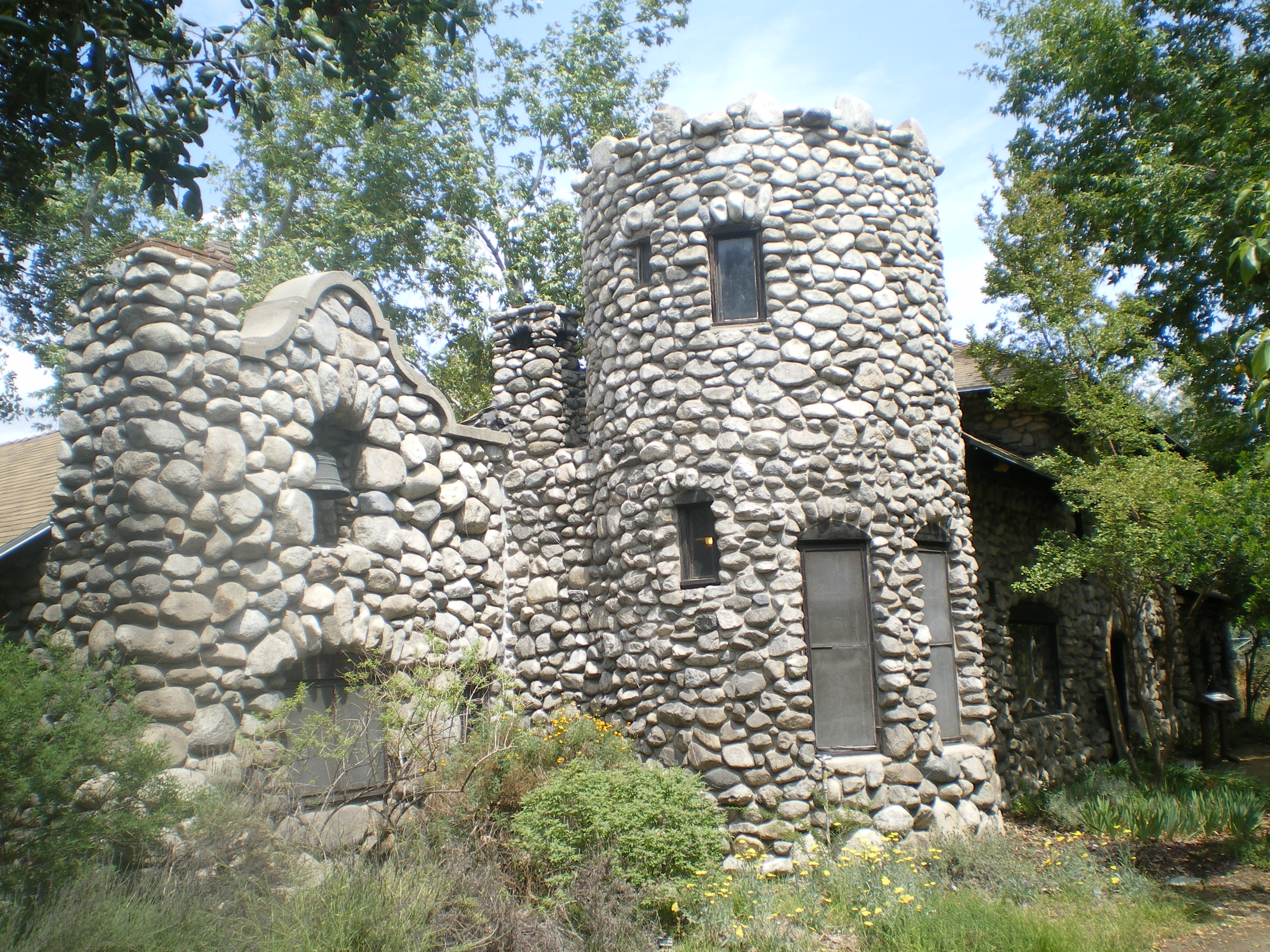
El Alisal in 2007

Lummis purchased a 3-acre plot around 1895 and spent 13 years building what would become a 4,000-square-foot stone home with an exhibition hall, calling it El Alisal (known today as the Lummis House). He frequently entertained, with parties he called "noises" for various writers, artists, and other prominent figures. The parties usually included a lavish Spanish dinner with dancing and music performed by his own private troubadour. The extravaganzas wore out a number of female assistants or "secretaries" conscripted into working on them.

The Lummis House was donated to the Southwest Museum of the American Indian in 1910 and then sold in 1943 to the state of California, which transferred it to the city in 1971. The Historical Society of Southern California took occupancy in 1965, using it as headquarters and helping manage the property, eventually leaving in 2014. Open to the public as a museum and park on Saturdays and Sundays, the site also serves as a focus for Lummis Day activities (see below).

=== Southwest Museum of the American Indian ===
By 1907, Lummis founded the Southwest Museum of the American Indian in Los Angeles. He had led the fundraising campaign to build a new structure for it and saw the building open in August 1914.

The Southwest Museum of the American Indian operated independently until 2003, when it was merged into the Autry Museum of the American West. The Autry launched a multi-year conservation project to preserve the enormous collection amassed by Lummis and his successors. Much of the material was moved off-site, but The Southwest Museum has maintained an ongoing public exhibit on Pueblo pottery that is free of charge and open on Saturdays only.

=== Lummis Day Festival ===
Beginning in 2006, the annual Lummis Day Festival was established by the Lummis Day Community Foundation. It holds the festival in Lummis' honor on the first Sunday in June, drawing people to El Alisal and Heritage Square Museum for poetry readings, art exhibits, music, dance performances, and family activities. The foundation is a non-profit organization of community activists and arts organization leaders.

== Publications ==
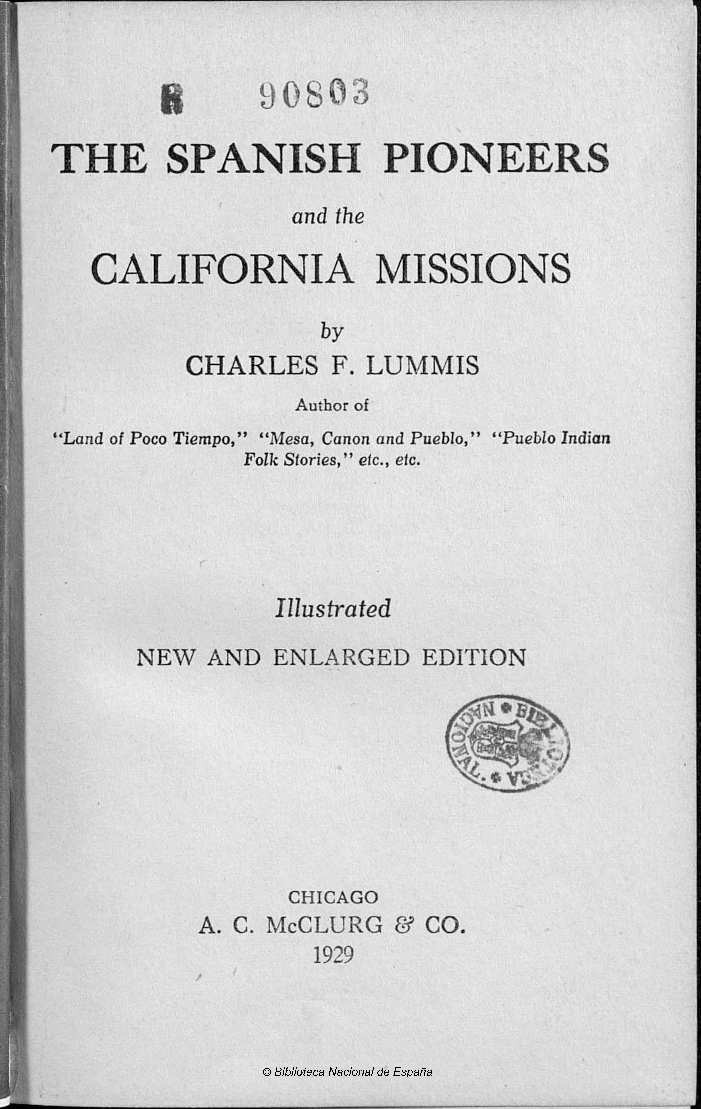
The Spanish Pioneers and the California Missions. BNE.

- Birch Bark Poems. C F Lummis. 1883
- A New Mexico David and Other Stories & Sketches of The Southwest. Scribner's. 1891
- Some strange corners of our country: the wonderland of the Southwest. 1892
- A Tramp Across The Continent (1892)
- My Friend Will. 1894
- The Gold Fish of Gran Chimu: A Novel. Lamson, Wolffe. 1896
- The Enchanted Burro: Stories of New Mexico & South America. 1897
- The awakening of a nation: Mexico of to-day. 1898
- The Landmarks Club Cook Book: A California Collection of the Choicest Recepes from Everywhere. The Out West Company. 1903
- Pueblo Indian Folk Stories. The Century Company. 1910
- The King Of The Broncos and Other Stories of New Mexico. Scribner's. 1915
- The Spanish Pioneers and the California Missions (1936) Full book online at The Internet Archive. 1920
- The Prose of It (poem on Geronimo). c. 1926
- A Bronco Pegasus: Poems. Houghton Mifflin. 1928
- Flowers Of Our Lost Romance (1909) Full book online at The Internet Archive Houghton Mifflin. 1929
- New Mexican Folk Songs. UNM Press. 1952
- General Crook and the Apache Wars. 1966
- Bullying The Moqui. 1968
- Dateline Fort Bowie: Charles Fletcher Lummis Reports on an Apache War. 1979
- A Tramp Across the Continent. University of Nebraska Press. 1982. ISBN 0-8032-7908-6
- Letters From The Southwest: September 20, 1884, to March 14, 1885. 1989
- Mesa, Cañon and Pueblo. University Press of the Pacific. 2004. ISBN 1-4102-1543-1
- Pueblo Indian Folk-Stories. Forgotten Books. 2008. ISBN 978-0-8032-7938-4
- The Land of Poco Tiempo. Charles Scribner's Sons. 1897.
- The Man Who Married the Moon and Other Pueblo Indian Folk Tales. (1891)

== Bibliography ==
- Bingham, Edwin R. (2006). Charles F. Lummis: Editor of the Southwest. Huntington Library. ISBN 978-0-87328-221-5.
- California Missions Foundation (2005). "Past Campaigns". Missionsofcalifornia.org/. Archived from the original on August 13, 2007.
- Deverell, William (2004). Whitewashed Adobe: The Rise of Los Angeles and the Remaking of Its Mexican Past. University of California Press, Berkeley and Los Angeles, California. ISBN 0-520-21869-8.
- Fleming, Robert E. (2001). "Charles F. Lummis". The Literary Encyclopedia.
- Gance, Samuel (2013). Anton ou la trajectoire d'un père. Paris: L'Harmattan. ISBN 978-2-336-29016-4. 208 p. (Devotes chapter XIV "Chas" to Lummis) Historical novel.
- Gordon, Dudley (1972). Charles F. Lummis: crusader in corduroy. Cultural Assets Press. p. 290.
- Keleher, Julia M.; Chant, Elsie Ruth (2009). The Padre of Isleta: The Story of Father Anton Docher. Sunstone press Publishing. ISBN 978-0-86534-714-4.
- Padget, Martin (2006). Indian Country: Travels in the American Southwest, 1840-1935. university of New Mexico Press.
- Simmons, Marc (2008). Charles F. Lummis: Author and Adventurer: A Gathering. Sunstone Books. ISBN 978-0-86534-639-0.
- Thompson, Mark (2001). American Character: The Curious Life of Charles Fletcher Lummis and the Rediscovery of the Southwest. Arcade Publishing, New York. ISBN 1-55970-550-7.
