= Salt Box =

Salt box may refer to:

- Saltbox house, an architectural style popularized in New England.
- Saltbox, a lidded wooden box formerly for storing salt; also a little used term for a salt cellar — a serving container for salt.
- Baltimore salt box, a yellow, lidded wooden box placed on Baltimore streets in winter to provide road salt for residents to spread.
- The Salt Box, a Los Angeles Historic Cultural Monument destroyed by fire in 1969.
