= Hale House (Los Angeles, California) =

Historic house in California, United States

- U.S. National Register of Historic Places
- Los Angeles Historic-Cultural Monument
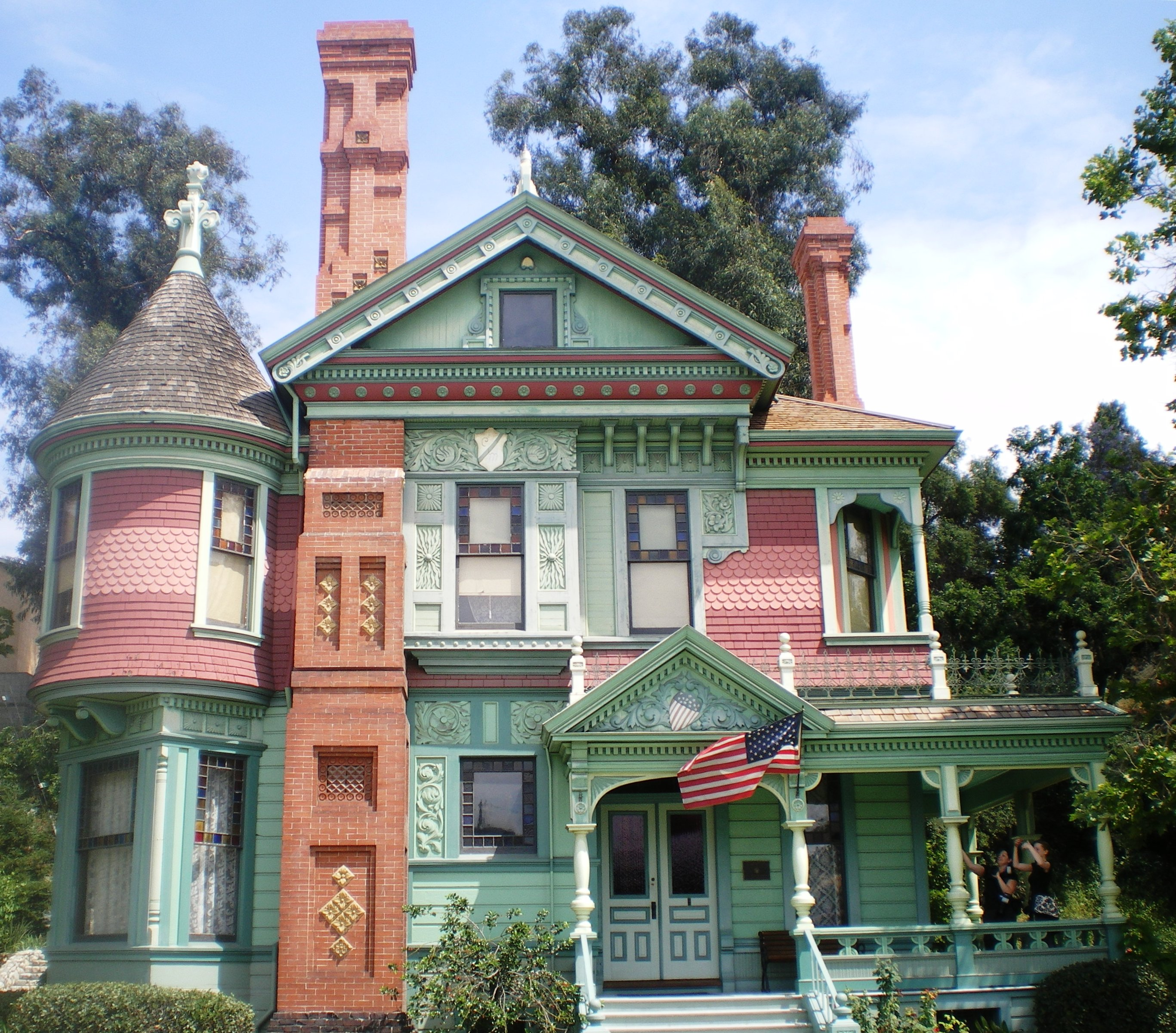
- Hale House, 2008

- Location within the Los Angeles metropolitan area Location within California Location within the United States
- Location: Heritage Sq., 3800 N. Homer St., Highland Park, Los Angeles, California
- Coordinates: 34°5′17.5″N 118°12′28.5″W
- Built: 1887
- Architect: Joseph Cather Newsom
- Architectural style: Queen Anne-Victorian
- NRHP reference No.: 72000230
- LAHCM No.: 40

Significant dates
- Added to NRHP: September 22, 1972
- Designated LAHCM: June 15, 1966

Hale House is a Queen Anne style Victorian mansion built in 1887 in the Highland Park section of northeast Los Angeles, California. It has been described as "the most photographed house in the entire city", and "the most elaborately decorated". In 1966, it was declared a Historic-Cultural Monument, and in 1972 it was listed on the National Register of Historic Places. The house was relocated in 1970 to the Heritage Square Museum in Montecito Heights where it remains open to the public.

== Early years ==
The Hale House was designed by Joseph Cather Newsom, a leading architect throughout the era. It was built in 1887 by real estate developer, George W. Morgan, at the foot of Mount Washington. Built at an original cost of less than $4,000, the house was originally situated at 4501 North Pasadena Avenue (now Figueroa Street), but was moved to 4425 North Pasadena before it was purchased by motorman James G. Hale. It is believed to have been associated with the old Page School for Girls which once stood directly across Avenue 44 from Hale House.

The house was purchased by James G. Hale and his newlywed, Beret “Bessie” Hovelsrud, in 1901. James Hale met Bessie, a farm girl from Nebraska, at the Pio Pico House she was waitressing in. The two fell in love, got married, and purchased the Hale House to live in; however, a few years later, the couple separated and Hale died from a heart attack on August 15, 1921, at age 51. Bessie retained title to the house. She operated the house as a boarding house until the late 1950s and lived there until she died in 1966 at age 97.

== Move to Heritage Square Museum ==
The house was inherited by Hale's niece, Odena Johnson, who stated her desire to dispose of it as soon as possible. When plans were announced to demolish the house and build a chrome and steel gas station in its place, the Los Angeles Cultural Heritage Commission stopped the demolition temporarily by declaring the house a Historic-Cultural Monument (HCM #40) in 1966. A column by noted Los Angeles Times columnist Jack Smith helped the preservation effort. Smith called the "faded old house" one of the few remaining from the "age of exuberance." Smith described the house's significance as follows:

The house has been called 'picturesque eclectic,' meaning its designer took a scroll from here and a fleur-de-lis from there and put everything together with romantic abandon. … Because of its eclectic nature, the Hale house is said to embody, in one package, many architectural inventions of the late 19th century, that buoyant and capricious era.

Hale's niece agreed to sell the house for $1 if it could be moved from the site. In July 1970, the house was lifted from its foundation and moved to the nearby Heritage Square Museum in Highland Park. The move cost $10,300 and an additional $3,000 to raise wires so the house could pass under. Jack Smith, who had been an advocate of the home's preservation, attended the midnight moving of the house in July 1970. He later wrote that a "motley and festive" crowd gathered to watch, with cries of jubilation rising when the chimneys survived the move.

Shortly after the move, the house was used as a movie set for a film depicting a house bombed in a war. The house was later restored at a cost of more than $300,000.

== Architecture ==
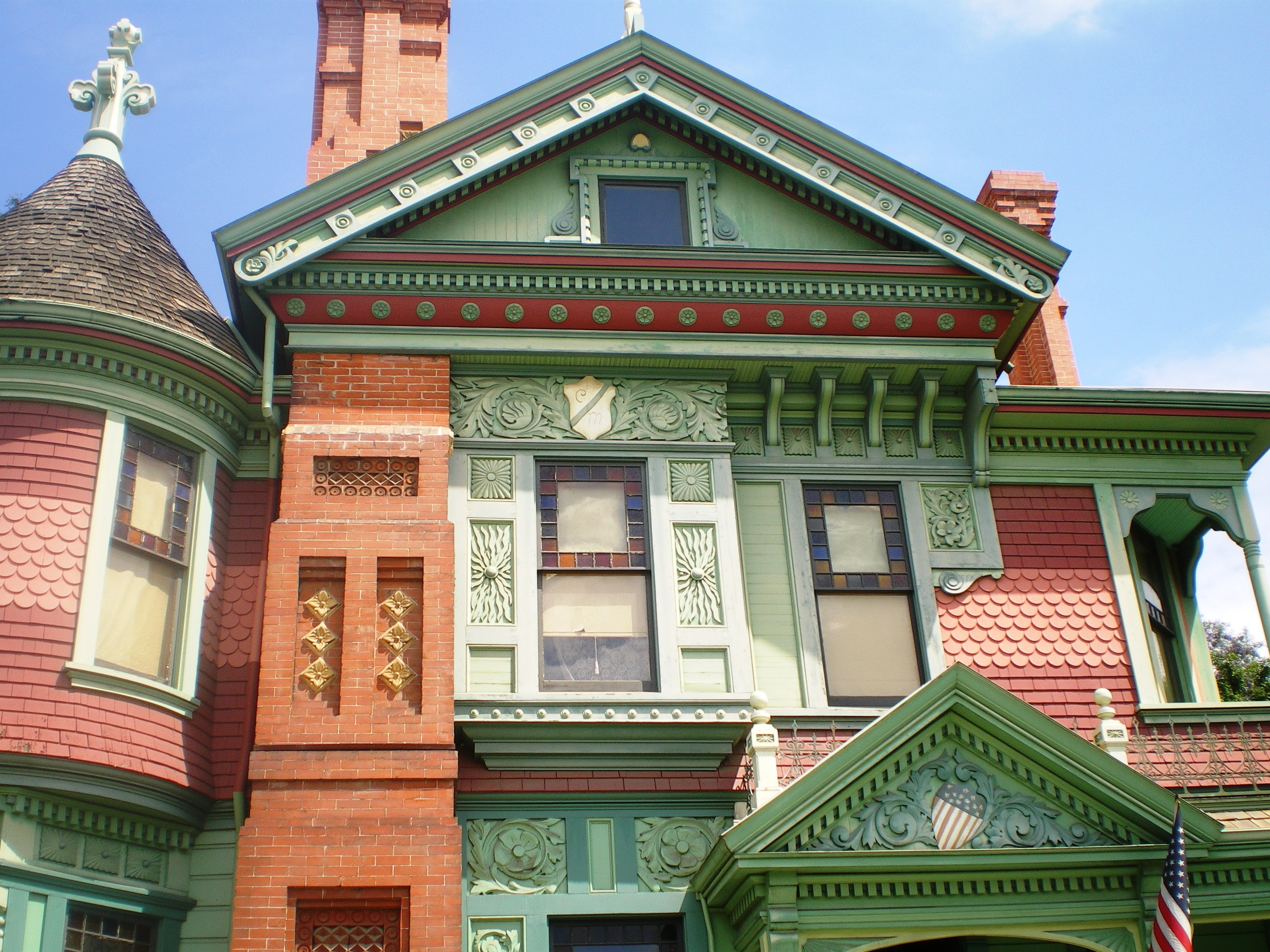
Front facade

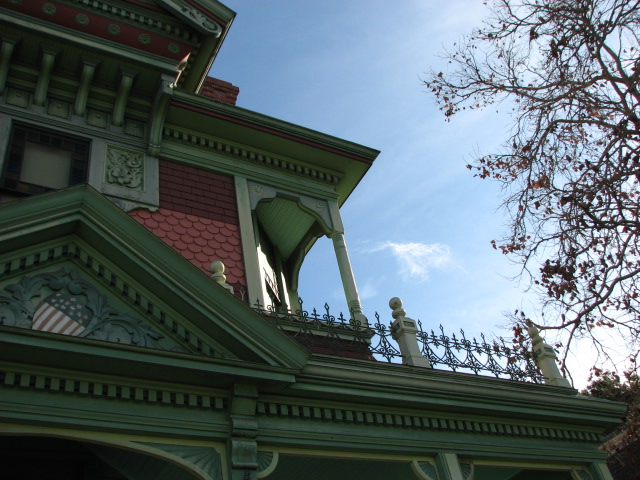
Right facade

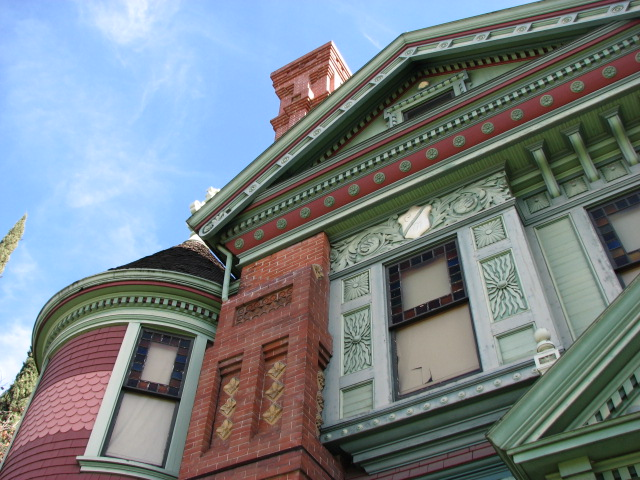
Left facade

The varied architectural style of the house has been described as Queen Anne, Eastlake, Carpenter Gothic, "picturesque eclectic," and "a capricious old gingerbread." Jack Smith overheard a neighbor say of the house, "What architecture! This old house? It's a mishmuch." Smith agreed but called it "a wonderful old mishmuch." Whatever the precise style, the house is an impeccable example of Victorian craftsmanship and design, with ornate brick chimneys, stained-glass windows, wood carvings, and a "corner turret" crowned with giant copper fleur-de-lis.

In a 1966 report to the Los Angeles Cultural Heritage Commission, Raymond Girvigian, the chairman of the historic buildings committee of the Southern California chapter of the American Institute of Architects said:

This residence, purchased by James and Bessie Hale about 1901, is a wood frame structure having exterior clapboard siding accented with fish scale shingles and cast plaster ornament around the main, east facade windows and pediments. Other notable features include a veranda at the northeast corner having turned wood posts with curved wood bracket caps and milled ballusters and an ornamental iron rail on its roof. It has brick chimneys with incised geometric detail and corbelled projections at top and a second floor turret window at the southeast corner, also curved wood brackets at the second floor cornice.

Noting the eclectic style, Givigian wrote that the house has "exuberance in ornamentation and detailing without academic rules, based on borrowed styles and forms of the past but mixed in unrestrained though often inventive and charming ways and fine craftsmanship." In announcing its designation of Hale House as a historic monument, the Cultural Heritage Commission gave the following reasons:

This picturesque structure is an outstanding example of the late Victorian period in Los Angeles. Its prime significance is that it perhaps best embodies the essence of, or the most typical features of, this historical style in one given example. The building incorporates the ornate carving of wood, both inside and out, that is fast disappearing. The chimney is characteristic of the high Victorian 'town house' of the period, and the workmanship compares with that of the best built mansions on the old Bunker Hill.

During the renovation of the house, chips of the original colors were found on the house. The exterior, which is mostly pink and teal, was painted with colors that were duplicated from the original colors that were found on chips on the house. The interior has been restored to recreate the appearance that it is believed to have had in 1899, but many of the house's original interior features remain intact. For instance, the "wainscoting downstairs, called Lincrusta, is original to the house and made of a pressed paper mixture processed to look like embossed leather." The oriental door bracket in the front parlor as well as the Eastlake-style dining table and chairs had been purchased by the Hale family. The Hale House and other old Los Angeles landmark structures are open for public tours, for a fee, at the Heritage Square Museum.

== In popular culture ==
The Hale House appears in the title sequences of Amanda's starring Beatrice Arthur. In the series, the Hale House features as the Californian hotel, Amanda's by the Sea, owned by Amanda Cartwright.

The Hale House also briefly appears in the original (promo film) music video for country artist Glen Campbell's song Wichita Lineman. The video was filmed in 1969.

The Hale House is seen on the cover of Coal Chamber's 1997 eponymous album.

The Hale House is the shooting location for the outside of ‘Ghost Tour’, a sketch in season 2 of I Think You Should Leave with Tim Robinson.

The exterior of the Hale House is used as the home of the widow Douglas in the 2015 film Band of Robbers, based on The Adventures of Tom Sawyer by Mark Twain, 1879.

== See also ==
- List of Los Angeles Historic-Cultural Monuments on the East and Northeast Sides
- List of Registered Historic Places in Los Angeles
