= Ziegler Estate =

Historic house in California, United States

- U.S. National Register of Historic Places
- Los Angeles Historic-Cultural Monument
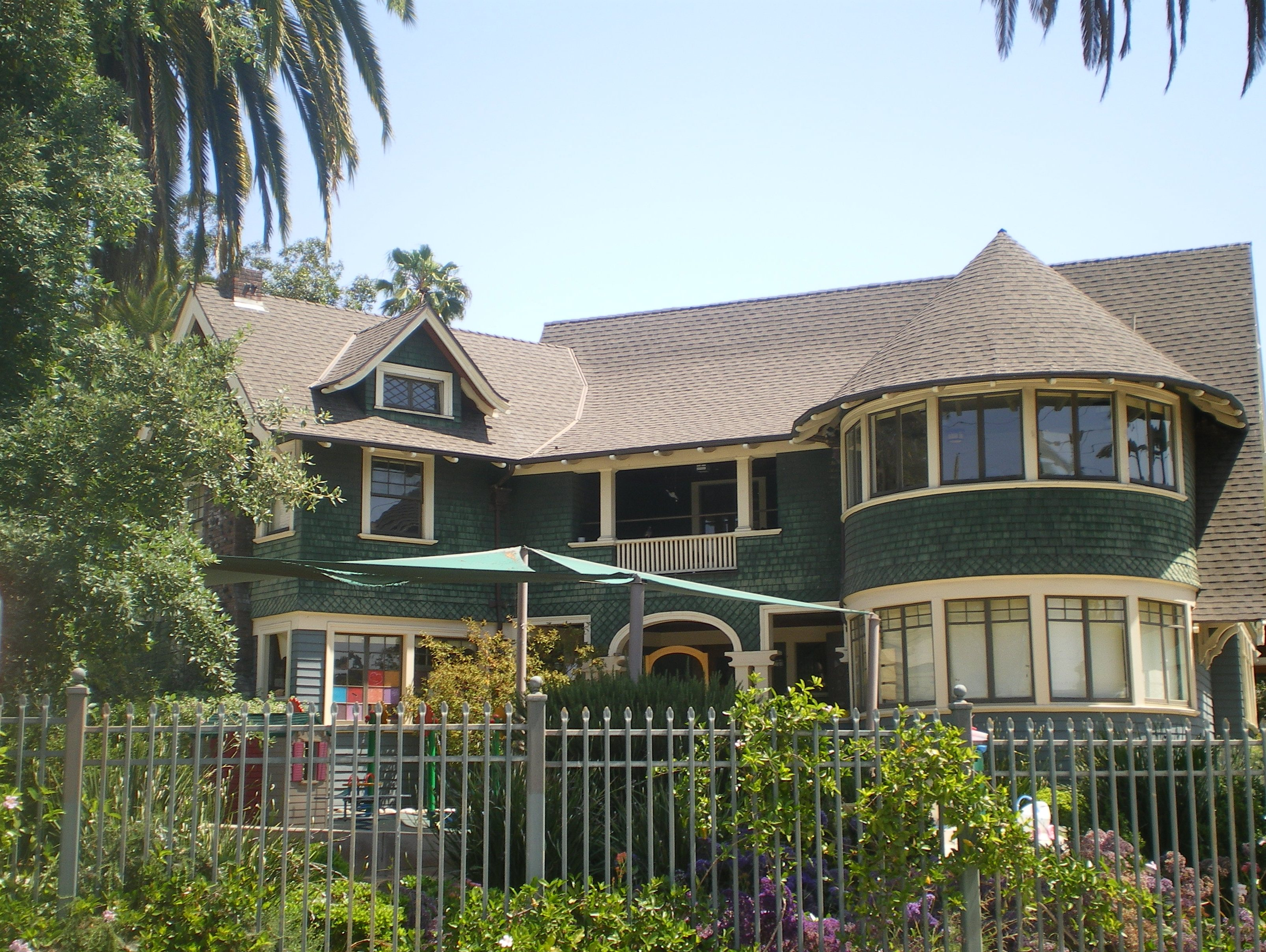
- Ziegler Estate, 2008

- Location within the Los Angeles metropolitan area Location within California Location within the United States
- Location: 4601 N. Figueroa St., Highland Park, Los Angeles, California
- Coordinates: 34°5′55″N 118°12′16″W
- Built: 1904
- Architect: Hornbeck, Charles; Wilson, Alfred P.
- Architectural style: Queen Anne, American Craftsman-Bungalow
- NRHP reference No.: 02000679
- LAHCM No.: 416

Significant dates
- Added to NRHP: June 27, 2002
- Designated LAHCM: February 21, 1989

Located in Northeast Los Angeles near the Southwest Museum, the Ziegler Estate is a historic building on Figueroa Street in the Highland Park section of Los Angeles, California. Built in 1904, the building was designed by Charles Hornbeck and Alfred P. Wilson with elements of both Queen Anne and American Craftsman architecture. In the 1950s, Carl Dentzel, then director of the Southwest Museum, purchased it as a potential addition to the Southwest Museum Complex, which also included the Casa de Adobe and the Braun Research Library. The house was recently used as a day-care facility, which closed to allow for renovation.

The Ziegler Estate was nominated by Charles J. Fisher and the Highland Park Heritage Trust for Los Angeles Historic Cultural designation, and was declared Monument #416 on February 21, 1989. On October 3, 2003, it was placed on the National Register of Historic Places.

== See also ==
- Los Angeles Historic-Cultural Monuments on the East and Northeast Sides
- List of Registered Historic Places in Los Angeles
