= Ernest and Florence Bent Halstead House and Grounds =

Coordinates: 34.095053°N 118.211291°W

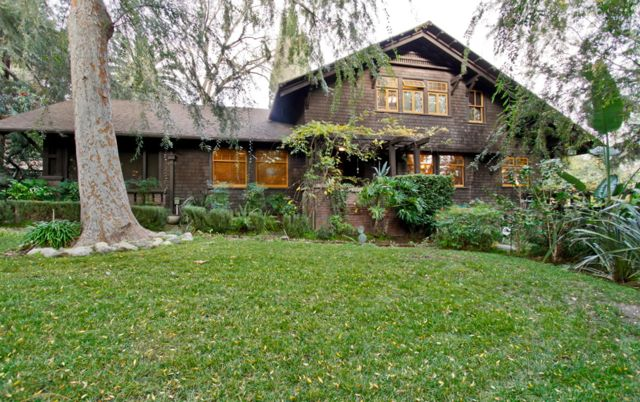
- The Bent-Halstead House
- Location: 4200 Glenalbyn Drive, Los Angeles
- Built: 1912
- Architectural style(s): American Craftsman
- Owner: Private

Los Angeles Historic-Cultural Monument
- Designated: November 4, 1988
- Reference no.: 394

The Ernest and Florence Bent Halstead House is an American Craftsman style home built in 1912 in Los Angeles, California.

== History ==
Built in 1912, the Bent-Halstead House was designed by the firm of Eager & Eager for Ernest Bent. It was later owned by Bent's sister, Florence Bent-Halstead. The house features a floor plan similar to a Ranch-style house, far ahead of its time.

The Bent brothers' construction company built the Devil's Gate Dam in the Arroyo Seco in Pasadena, California, and Sweetwater Dam in San Diego County, California.

== Historic-Cultural Monument ==
The Ernest and Florence Bent Halstead House and Grounds is a Los Angeles Historic-Cultural Monument, declared Monument #394 on November 4, 1988. It had been nominated by Charles J. Fisher and the Highland Park Heritage Trust.

The house is located at 4200 Glenalbyn Drive in Mt. Washington, Los Angeles.

== See also ==
- List of Los Angeles Historic-Cultural Monuments on the East and Northeast Sides
