= Charles J. Fisher =

American writer

Charles J. Fisher is an American published author and Los Angeles–based historic preservation activist who has successfully nominated more than 180 historic buildings as City of Los Angeles Historic-Cultural Monuments, as well as designated historic buildings for the County of Ventura and in the cities of Glendale, Monrovia, Ojai and Sierra Madre.

Fisher, a native Angeleno, together with other historical preservation advocates, founded the Highland Park Heritage Trust in 1982 to halt the demolition of pristine Craftsman and Mission Revival homes in favor of low-quality, high-density apartment structures. The Heritage Trust historic survey assessed hundreds of properties to create the Highland Park Historic Preservation Overlay Zone (Highland Park-Garvanza HPOZ), the largest Historic Preservation Overlay Zone in the city of Los Angeles. Fisher has served three times as president of the Heritage Trust, and served for 25 years on the Highland Park-Garvanza HPOZ board.

Fisher has worked in conjunction with the Los Angeles Conservancy, the Highland Park Heritage Trust, various historical societies, and numerous Los Angeles neighborhood councils, resident's groups, community groups, and advocacy groups to preserve Los Angeles' unique historic architectural and cultural legacy.

He also the author of two books, Highland Park (2008) and Garvanza (2010), both published by Arcadia Press. He is working on a comprehensive book giving a history of each of the Los Angeles City Historic Cultural Monuments.

== Successful monument nominations ==
Year	Monument #	Monument name
		City of Glendale
2022	143	Sherman and Henrietta Ford House
2019	132	Cole Residence
2019	131	Josiah T. Wright Residence
2017	118	Freeman Residence
		City of Los Angeles
2024	1311	Astro Family Restaurant
2023	1293	Cunningham Residence
2023	1285	White-Mooers House
2022	1281	Jablonski Residence
2022	1272	Queen of Elysian Heights
2022	1261	Throop House
2021	1252	Eddie "Rochester" Anderson Residence
2021	1243	Medway Residence
2021	1230	Art A. Smith Courtyard Apartments
2021	1225	Harrington Residence
2020	1210	Bonnet House
2019	1197	Morris Abrams Chateau des Roses
2019	1196	Fred C. Thomson Building
2019	1189	Hunter Ranch House
2019	1188	Collins Hacienda
2018	1172	Wallace Beery's Hollywood Hideaway
2018	1169	The Montecito
2018	1162	Walter Daniels Duplex
2017	1155	F. and W. Grand Silver Store Building
2017	1150	Schaefer House
2017	1151	Hollywood Reporter Building
2016	1130	Hollywood Palladium
2016	1117	Welfer Residence
2016	1116	Albert Van Luit Complex
2016	1114	Redwine Building
2016	1110	Restovich House
2016	1109	Casa de Mi Sueño
2016	1104	Hammers House
2016	1103	Sheldon-Graves House
2015	1100	Polito House
2015	1099	Fernbacher Flats
2015	1097	Fifth Church of Christ Scientist
2015	1094	Gillespie House
2015	1087	Wilshire Professional Building
2015	1084	Villa Minola
2015	1083	Zieger House
2014	1073	Charles C. Hurd Residence
2014	1071	York Boulevard Church of Christ
2014	1070	The Polynesian
2014	1069	Hlaffer-Courcier Residence
2014	1068	J. W. Blank Residence
2014	1061	Abraham Gore Residence
2013	1041	Donnelly House
2013	1038	Gibbons-Del Rio Residence
2013	1037	Southaven
2013	1027	John Anson Ford Residence
2013	1026	Sherwood House
2013	1025	Durex Model Home
2013	1024	Lechner House
2012	1022	Los Angeles Department of Water and Power General Office Building
2012	1020	Firestone Tire Company Building
2012	1018	Thorsen Residence
2012	1017	Young-Gribling Residence
2012	1015	Stein House
2011	1010	North Sycamore Chateau
2011	1004	Richard Henry Dana Branch Library
2011	999	Marsh Duplex
2011	998	Boettcher House
2011	997	Clifford Clinton Residence
2011	996	Garden of Oz
2011	994	Arensberg-Stendahl Home Gallery
2011	992	T. R. Craig Residence "Peppergate Ranch"
2010	986	Lento Brick Court
2010	985	Sun Realty Company Building
2010	984	Spreckels Building
2010	979	Venice West Cafe
2010	973	Henry Shire Residence
2010	972	Shire Art House
2010	971	Villa Palombo-Tagneri
2009	952	Kaye Residence
2009	951	James F. Real Studio-Office
2009	950	Original Echo Park Clubhouse
2009	949	Bank of America – Echo Park Branch
2009	944	Hermon Car Wall
2009	943	Heerman Estate
2008	939	The Black Cat Tavern
2008	932	Clarence G. Badger Residence
2008	931	Castle Crag
2008	929	Oliver Flats
2008	928	Chateau Alpine
2008	927	Sturdevant Bungalow
2008	924	Bigford Residence
2008	923	Kennedy-Solow Residence
2008	922	Edward A. “Tink” Adams House
2008	916	Petitfils Residence
2008	915	Victor Rossetti Residence
2008	913	Blackburn Residence
2007	899	Charles C. Chapman Building
2007	897	Haven of Rest
2007	894	Monroe Cottage
2007	893	Castera Residence
2007	890	Waite Residence
2007	889	McNary House
2007	878	Arwin Manor
2007	877	Wilkins House
2007	874	Garber House
2007	872	Raphael Junction Block Building (New York Suspender Factory-California Ice Company)
2007	870	San Marino Villas (Site of - Demolished illegally on April 11, 2014)
2007	868	O'Neil Duplex No. 1
2007	861	Monsignor O'Brien House
2007	859	Orchard Gables Cottage
2006	858	One Hundred North Sycamore
2006	855	Statton Residence
2006	854	Cline Residence and Museum
2006	849	Nickel-Leong Mansion
2006	844	Purviance Residence (Initially rejected, adopted after City Council motion by Eric Garcetti)
2006	840	Amsalem A. Ernst House
2006	839	Paul Landacre Cabin
2005	827	Arthur B. Benton Residence
2005	824	Mary Stilson Residence
2005	823	Marshall Flats
2005	810	Edward J. Borgmeyer House
2005	809	Franklin T. Briles Residence
2005	805	J. A. Howsley House
2005	802	Hodel Residence and Teahouse
2005	796	Jacobsen Duplex
2005	163	Site of Walt Disney Studio (Nominated in 2005 to annex the site of the Animator's School.)
2004	781	Mills Cottage
2004	778	Murdock Residence
1994	614	Wolford House
1994	613	Scholfield House
1994	612	Bircher-Share Residence
1994	611	Minster Residence
1993	585	Occidental College Hall of Letters Building (Savoy Apartments)
1993	582	W. F. Poor Residence
1993	581	York Boulevard State Bank - Bank of America and Store Fronts
1993	575	Security Trust and Savings Bank (Highland Park Branch)
1992	565	Charles H. Greenshaw Residence
1992	564	E. A. Spencer Estate
1992	558	Department of Water and Power Distributing Station No. 2
1992	556	Charlie and Nettie Williams Home
1991	550	A. J. Madison House
1991	549	Highland Theatre Building
1991	541	Reverend Williel Thomson Residence
1991	540	Piper House (Site of - Destroyed by Fire in 1992)
1991	539	J. E. Maxwell Residence
1991	529	Montecito View House
1991	528	Dr. Franklin S. Whaley Residence
1991	516	St. Johns Episcopal Church
1990	508	Gilmore Gasoline Service Station
1990	503	Wachtel Studio-Home and Eucalyptus Grove
1990	494	Kelman Residence and Carriage Barn
1990	493	Casa de Adobe
1990	492	Arroyo Seco Bank Building
1990	491	James B. Booth Residence and Carriage House
1990	483	J. B. Merrill House
1990	482	Arthur S. Bent House
1990	481	Mauer House
1989	470	Ivar I. Phillips Residence
1989	469	Ivar I. Phillips Dwelling
1989	464	Fargo House
1989	443	Bowman Residence (Exterior only)
1989	442	Albion Cottages and Milagro Market
1989	437	A. H. Judson Estate (Site of - Demolished in 1992)
1989	418	George W. Wilson Estate (Site of - Destroyed by Fire on December 14, 1989)
1989	416	Zieglar Estate
1989	413	Octagon House (Heritage Square)
1989	412	Garvanza Pumping Station and Site of Highland Reservoir
1989	411	Robert Edmund Williams House (Hathaway Home for Children)
1988	404	Los Angeles Railway Huron Substation
1988	402	Frederic M. Ashley House
1988	400	Sunrise Court
1988	395	H. Stanley Bent House (Including Carriage House and Front Fountain)
1988	394	Ernest and Florence Bent Halstead House and Grounds
1988	393	Wiles House and Grounds
1988	392	Treehaven, Guest House and Grounds
1988	389	C. M. Church House
1988	380	Reeves House (Site of - Destroyed by fire on October 10, 2017)
1988	379	Morrell House
1988	378	Wheeler-Smith House
1988	377	Ollie Tract (except Lot 7)
1988	376	William U. Smith House and Arroyo Stone Wall
1988	375	Putnam House
1988	374	G. W. E. Griffith House
1988	373	Arroyo Stone House and Arroyo Stone Wall
1988	372	Mary P. Field House and Arroyo Stone Wall
1988	371	Tustin House and Arroyo Stone Wall
1988	370	Herivel House and Arroyo Stone Wall
1988	369	Johnson House and Arroyo Stone Wall
1988	366	Latter House and Arroyo Stone Wall
1988	339	Santa Fe's Arroyo Seco Bridge
1988	338	Drake House
		City of Monrovia
2019	148	Route 66 Business Block
		City of Ojai
2013	20	Arbolada House 'B'
		City of Sierra Madre
2017	1	Casa de Monte Lado
2016	10	Webster House
2016	32	Becker House
2014	41	Blumer Farmhouse
		County of Ventura
2010	169	William Ford Residence
2010	170	Acacia Mansion
