= San Antonio Winery =

American winery located in California

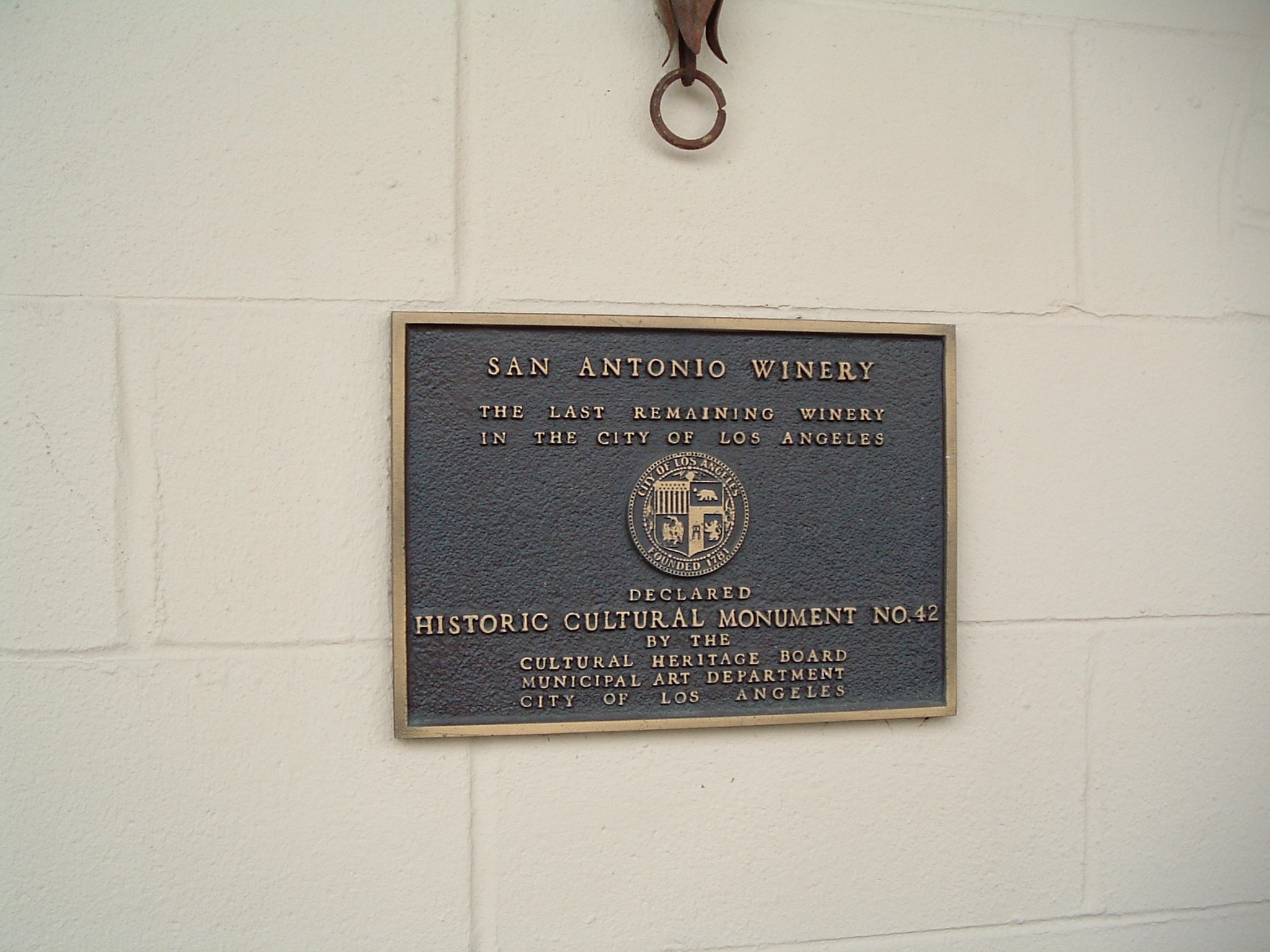
- Location: Lincoln Heights, Los Angeles, California, United States 34.0637°N 118.2239°W
- Appellation: California wine
- Founded: 1917
- Varietals: Cabernet Sauvignon, Chardonnay, Merlot, Pinot noir, Sauvignon blanc, Syrah
- Distribution: International
- Website: sanantoniowinery.com

Los Angeles Historic-Cultural Monument
- Designated: September 14, 1966
- Reference no.: 42

The San Antonio Winery is a winery in the Lincoln Heights district in the city of Los Angeles It has operated since 1917 just east of downtown at 737 Lamar Street, south of North Main Street. The winery includes a wine and gift shop, restaurant, and various rooms available for private events.

The winery uses grapes from the 500-acre (2.0 km^{2}) Riboli family farm in Monterey, a smaller Napa Valley vineyard, and contracts with other Californian growers. Besides the bottling and distribution at the original winery site, they have an energy-efficient winemaking facility in Paso Robles and opened a tasting room there in 2016. San Antonio produces varietal, table wines, and dessert wines, both red and white.

== History ==
In 1917, Santo Cambianica, an Italian man from the northern Italy province of Lombardy, immigrated to Los Angeles and started the winery at its current location. Hoping for good luck, he dedicated the winery to Saint Anthony (in Italian: San Antonio) by naming it as such. When Prohibition was enacted in 1920, Cambianica asked for permission from the Catholic Church to continue operating his winery for communion wine. They also sold grapes to home wine makers. The winery has been declared as historical monument #42 in the city of Los Angeles.

== Brands ==
San Antonio Winery produces and markets several wine brands.

- Stella Rosa is one of the best-selling brands of semi-sweet wine in the United States. In 2020, according to data analysis from Nielsen, the Stella Rosa brand was the seventh most popular wine by total sales, and #1 fastest growing wine. The grapes for Stella Rosa wines are sourced from the Asti region of Piedmont, Italy, where the wines are fully produced. They undergo arrested fermentation via a process called the Charmat method to produce a frizzante texture.

== See also ==
- Los Angeles Historic-Cultural Monuments on the East and Northeast Sides
