= List of Los Angeles Historic-Cultural Monuments on the East and Northeast Sides =

This is a list of Los Angeles Historic-Cultural Monuments on the East and Northeast Sides of the city of Los Angeles, California, in the United States. There are more than 140 Los Angeles Historic-Cultural Monuments (LAHCM) in this area. It includes the communities of Boyle Heights, Highland Park, Eagle Rock, Lincoln Heights, Mt. Washington, Hermon, Garvanza and Montecito Heights. They are designated by the City's Cultural Heritage Commission.

== Current and former Historic-Cultural Monuments ==
HCM #	Landmark name	Image	Date designated	Locality	Neighborhood	Description
10	Eagle Rock		November 16, 1962	Terminus of N. Figueroa St. 34°8′36″N 118°11′01″W	Eagle Rock	Large outcropping of rock, with an overhang which produces a shadow that looks like an eagle in flight under certain lighting conditions.
22	Palms-Southern Pacific Railroad Depot		August 9, 1963	3800 Homer Street; 34°5′18″N 118°12′29″W	Montecito Heights, Lincoln Heights	Rail depot built c. 1887 in Palms, became part of the Pacific Electric Railway in 1911; relocated to Heritage Square
40	Hale House		June 15, 1966	3800 Homer St. 34°5′18″N 118°12′28″W	Montecito Heights, Lincoln Heights	Colorful Victorian house called the most photographed house in Los Angeles; moved to Heritage Square Museum in 1970
42	San Antonio Winery		September 14, 1966	737 Lamar St. 34°3′50″N 118°13′25″W	Lincoln Heights	Winery founded in 1917; the last remaining winery in the city of Los Angeles.
54	Old 6th Street Wooden Bridge		May 22, 1968	Hollenbeck Park Lake; 34°2′26″N 118°13′03″W	Boyle Heights	Bridge demolished in 1968
59	Eagle Rock City Hall		February 26, 1969	2035 Colorado Blvd. 34°8′21″N 118°12′38″W	Eagle Rock	This three-level, Spanish tile-roofed building was constructed in 1922, three years after Eagle Rock was incorporated as a City. It later became a part of the City of Los Angeles.
62	Judson Studios	Judson Studios, May 2008	August 13, 1969	200-204 S. Avenue 66; 34°6′45″N 118°10′47″W	Highland Park	Founded in 1897.
65	Valley Knudsen Garden Residence		April 15, 1970	3800 Homer St. 34°5′17″N 118°12′29″W	Montecito Heights, Lincoln Heights	This home was built around 1877 in East Los Angeles (Lincoln Heights) for a man named Richard E.Shaw. This 19th Century Mansard style residence was sold to the city and moved to Heritage Square Museum in 1971 from 1926 Johnston st, Lincoln Heights 90031. In February, 1971, the building was dedicated to Mrs Valley Knudsen the founder and president of the Bel Air Garden Club, which paid for much of the house’s renovation.
68	Charles Lummis Residence		September 2, 1970	200 E. Avenue 43; 34°5′35″N 118°12′25″W	Highland Park	Also known as El Alisal; fanciful rock house built by Charles Fletcher Lummis now operated as a museum
97	Residence at 1620 Pleasant Avenue		February 23, 1972	1620 Pleasant Avenue; 34°2′52″N 118°13′14″W	Boyle Heights	High Victorian Italianate house demolished in 1973
98	Mt. Pleasant House		March 15, 1972	3800 Homer St. 34°5′18″N 118°12′27″W	Montecito Heights, Lincoln Heights	High Victorian Italianate mansion built in 1876; moved to Heritage Square Museum in 1975
102	Residence at 1030 Cesar E. Chavez Avenue		October 4, 1972	1030 Cesar E. Chavez Avenue; 34°3′13″N 118°13′28″W	Boyle Heights	One of the few brick houses from the Victorian era remaining in Los Angeles
105	Hiner House		November 15, 1972	4757 N. Figueroa St. 34°6′05″N 118°12′12″W	Highland Park	California chalet house with Oriental influence built by music professor Edwin C. Hiner in 1922 using stones from the Arroyo Seco
106	San Encino Abbey		November 15, 1972	6211 Arroyo Glen; 34°6′48″N 118°11′06″W	Highland Park	Modeled on a 17th-century monastery and includes rocks and bits of masonry from old monasteries, castles and European ruins
107	McClure Residence		November 15, 1972	432-498 N. Avenue 66; 34°7′01″N 118°10′35″W	Garvanza	Queen Anne and Eastlake style Victorian house built c. 1890
108	Beaudry Avenue House		January 3, 1973	3800 Homer St. 34°5′16″N 118°12′30″W	Montecito Heights, Lincoln Heights	Italianate, Queen Anne and Eastlake style Victorian house built in 1885; moved to Heritage Square Museum in 1974
142	El Mio		April 16, 1975	5905 El Mio Dr. 34°6′51″N 118°11′34″W	Highland Park	Queen Anne and Eastlake house built in 1887 for Judge David Patterson Hatch, who relocated from Santa Barbara to preside over the Lucky Baldwin breach of promise lawsuit. The house is listed on the National Register under the Smith Estate, named after a family that owned it for over 60 years.
143	Residence at 6028 Hayes Avenue		April 16, 1975	6028 Hayes Ave. 34°6′35″N 118°11′13″W	Highland Park	
144	Residence at 2054-2056 Griffin Avenue		May 21, 1975	2054-2056 Griffin Ave. 34°4′09″N 118°12′41″W	Lincoln Heights	
145	Residence at 3537 Griffin Avenue		May 21, 1975	3537 Griffin Ave. 34°5′09″N 118°12′37″W	Montecito Heights	
153	Lincoln Park Carousel		April 21, 1976	Valley Boulevard & Mission Road	Lincoln Heights	Demolished: 08-25-1976 after severe fire damage
156	Fire Station No. 1		July 7, 1976	2230 Pasadena Ave. 34°4′31″N 118°13′06″W	Lincoln Heights	The 1940 LAFD station is classified as an example of Streamline Moderne architecture.
157	Residence at 3110 N. Broadway		July 7, 1976	3110 N. Broadway; 34°4′25″N 118°12′31″W	Lincoln Heights	
164	Glendale-Hyperion Bridge		October 20, 1976	Los Angeles River	Griffith Park	The 56-foot-wide (17 m), 1,370-foot-long (420 m) bridge crosses over the Los Angeles River, Golden State Freeway and Riverside Drive, between Ettrick Street and Glenfeliz Boulevard. Completed in 1929, it features a series of reinforced concrete arches.
245	Lincoln Avenue Church Building		June 4, 1981	3800 Homer Street	Montecito Heights, Lincoln Heights	
261	Lincoln Heights Branch Library		June 3, 1983	2530 Workman St. 34°04′34″N 118°12′51″W	Lincoln Heights	Second oldest branch library in Los Angeles; built in 1916 with a grant from Andrew Carnegie
262	Residence at 2700 Eagle Street		June 3, 1983	2700 Eagle St. 34°2′16.7″N 118°12′30.26″W	Boyle Heights	
263	Villa Rafael		June 3, 1983	2123 Parkside Ave. 34°4′11″N 118°12′01″W	Lincoln Heights	
265	Bridge at Fourth and Lorena Streets		June 7, 1983	Fourth and Lorena Streets	Boyle Heights	
269	Mount Washington Cable Car Station		June 28, 1983	200-202 W. Avenue 43; 34°5′43″N 118°12′35″W	Mt. Washington	
274	Highland Park Police Station		January 4, 1984	6045 York Blvd. 34°7′8″N 118°11′12″W	Highland Park	Former police station built in 1926; now used as the Los Angeles Police Museum
282	Highland Park Masonic Temple		August 29, 1984	104 N. Avenue 56; 34°6′32″N 118°11′37″W	Highland Park	Well-preserved Masonic Temple built in 1923; now used as a banquet facility
283	Southwest Museum	Southwest Museum from Debs Park	August 29, 1984	234 Museum Dr. 34°6′3″N 118°12′21″W	Mt. Washington	Museum and archive for American Indian and Western art and artifacts; opened 1914
284	Highland Park Ebell Club Building		August 29, 1984	125-135 S. Avenue 57; 34°6′31″N 118°11′32″W	Highland Park	Ebell women's club, Highland Park chapter building, built 1912.
287	Yoakum House		January 18, 1985	140-154 S. Avenue 59; 34°6′33″N 118°11′26″W	Highland Park	Father Finis Ewing Yoakum (Pisgah Home halfway house founder) lived in this the 2-story house; built in 1915 Tudor revival style;
292	Old Eagle Rock Branch Library		June 18, 1985	2225 Colorado Blvd. 34°8′22″N 118°12′53″W	Eagle Rock	The former Carnegie library was built in 1915 in a Mission Revival and Spanish Colonial Revival style
304	Malabar Branch Library		May 19, 1987	2801 Wabash Ave. 34°3′2″N 118°11′47″W	Boyle Heights	Branch library; built in 1926; ornamental frieze above entrance
322	Fletcher Drive Bridge		July 21, 1987	Fletcher Drive at Los Angeles River	Atwater Village	
338	Drake House		January 26, 1988	210-220 S. Avenue 60; 34°6′35″N 118°11′17″W	Highland Park	
339	Santa Fe Arroyo Seco Railroad Bridge		January 26, 1988	162 S. Avenue 61; 34°6′35″N 118°11′12″W	Highland Park	
359	Breed Street Shul (Congregation Talmud Torah)		November 4, 2001	247 N. Breed St. 34°2′48″N 118°12′31″W	Boyle Heights	Largest Orthodox synagogue in the western United States from 1915 to 1951
366	Latter House and Arroyo Stone Wall		June 21, 1988	137-151 S. Avenue 57; 34°6′30″N 118°11′32″W	Highland Park	
369	Johnson House & Arroyo Stone Wall		July 15, 1988	4985 N. Figueroa St. 34°6′16″N 118°12′09″W	Highland Park	
370	Herivel House & Arroyo Stone Wall		July 15, 1988	4979-4985 N. Figueroa St. 34°6′15″N 118°12′09″W	Highland Park	
371	Tustin House & Arroyo Stone Wall		July 15, 1988	4967-4973 N. Figueroa St. 34°6′15″N 118°12′10″W	Highland Park	
372	Mary P. Field House & Arroyo Stone Wall		July 15, 1988	4967-4971 N. Sycamore Terrace; 34°6′16″N 118°12′10″W	Highland Park	
373	Arroyo Stone House & Arroyo Stone Wall		July 15, 1988	4939 N. Figueroa St. 34°6′12″N 118°12′10″W	Highland Park	
374	G.W.E. Griffith House		July 15, 1988	5915-5919 Echo St. 34°6′35″N 118°11′22″W	Highland Park	
375	Putnam House		July 15, 1988	5944-5948 Hayes Ave. 34°6′32″N 118°11′19″W	Highland Park	
376	William U. Smith House & Arroyo Stone Wall		July 15, 1988	140 S. Avenue 57	Highland Park	
377	Ollie Tract		July 15, 1988	179-199 S. Avenue 57; 5701-5731 Benner Street	Highland Park	
378	Wheeler - Smith House		July 15, 1988	5676-5688 Ash Street		
379	Morrell House		July 15, 1988	215 N. Avenue 53	Highland Park	
380	Reeves House		July 15, 1988	219 N. Avenue 53	Highland Park	Destroyed by trash fire: 10-10-2017
383	Residence at 1203-1207 Kipling Avenue		August 5, 1988	1203-1207 Kipling Avenue	Eagle Rock	
384	Department of Water and Power Building		August 5, 1988	2417 Daly St. 34°4′27″N 118°12′56″W	Lincoln Heights	
388	Edison Electric Company (Los Angeles No. 3 Steam Power Plant)		October 21, 1988	650 S. Avenue 21; 34°3′49″N 118°13′01″W	Lincoln Heights	
389	C. M. Church House		October 4, 1988	5907 Echo St. 34°6′35″N 118°11′24″W	Highland Park	
392	Treehaven Guest House and Grounds		November 4, 1988	4211 Glenalbyn Dr. 34°5′44″N 118°12′40″W	Mt. Washington	
393	Wiles House and Grounds		November 4, 1988	4224 Glenalbyn Dr. 34°5′43″N 118°12′38″W	Mt. Washington	
394	Ernest and Florence Bent Halstead House and Grounds		November 4, 1988	4200 Glenalbyn Dr. 34°5′42″N 118°12′40″W	Mt. Washington	An American Craftsman style home built in 1908
395	H. Stanley Bent House		November 4, 1988	4201 Glenalbyn Dr. 34°5′44″N 118°12′42″W	Mt. Washington	includes carriage house and front fountain
396	Federal Bank Building		November 23, 1988	2201 N. Broadway	Lincoln Heights	
400	Sunrise Court		November 23, 1988	5721-5729 Monte Vista Street	Highland Park	
402	Frederic M. Ashley House		December 9, 1988	740-742 N. Avenue 66; 34°7′10″N 118°10′28″W	Garvanza	
404	Los Angeles Railway Huron Substation		December 20, 1988	2640 N. Huron St. 34°5′07″N 118°13′19″W	Cypress Park	
411	Robert Edmund Williams House (Hathaway Home for Children)		January 18, 1989	840 N. Avenue 66	Garvanza	
412	Garvanza Pumping Station and site of Highland Reservoir		January 20, 1989	420 N. Avenue 62	Garvanza	
413	Octagon House		January 20, 1989	3800 Homer St. 34°5′17″N 118°12′30″W	Montecito Heights, Lincoln Heights	Eight-sided house built by Gilbert Longfellow in 1893; Now located at Heritage Square Museum
416	Ziegler Estate		February 21, 1989	4601 N. Figueroa Blvd. 34°5′55″N 118°12′16″W	Highland Park	
418	George W. Wilson Estate		February 17, 1989	616 N. Avenue 66	Highland Park	Destroyed by fire: 12-14-1989
437	A. H. Judson Estate		May 19, 1989	4909-4915 N. Sycamore Terrace; 4911 Pasadena Avenue Terrace	Mount Washington	Demolished: 01-01-1992
442	Albion Cottages and Milagro Market		June 20, 1989	1801-1813 Albion Street	Lincoln Heights	
443	Bowman Residence		June 20, 1989	2425 Griffin Avenue	Lincoln Heights	
461	Meyers House		November 3, 1989	4340 Eagle Rock Boulevard	Eagle Rock	Destroyed by fire: 01-01-1992
464	Fargo House		November 3, 1989	206 Thorne Street	Garvanza	
468	Sacred Heart Church		December 5, 1989	2210 Sichel St. 34°4′14″N 118°12′45″W	Lincoln Heights	
469	Ivar I. Phillips Dwelling		December 20, 1989	4200 N. Figueroa Street	Highland Park	
470	Ivar I. Phillips Residence		December 20, 1989	4204 N. Figueroa Street	Highland Park	
471	Argus Court		December 20, 1989	1760-1768 Colorado Boulevard	Eagle Rock	
481	Mauer House		March 23, 1990	932 Rome Drive	Mt. Washington	
482	Arthur S. Bent House		May 1, 1987	161-169 S. Avenue 49	Highland Park	
483	J. B. Merrill House		March 23, 1990	815 Elyria Drive	Mt. Washington	
486	Nineteenth Century Los Angeles Chinese Cemetery Shrine		August 31, 1990	204 N. Evergreen Street	Boyle Heights	Oldest surviving structure of Chinese settlement in Los Angeles; use of traditional ceremonies brought from China
492	Arroyo Seco Bank Building		July 13, 1990	6169-6199 York Blvd.; 6301-6311 N. Figueroa St.	Highland Park	
493	Casa de Adobe		July 13, 1990	4603-4613 Figueroa St & 4610-4618 Woodside	Highland Park	
494	Kelman Residence and Carriage Barn		July 13, 1990	5029 Echo Street	Highland Park	
503	Wachtel Studio - Home & Eucalyptus Grove		October 9, 1990	315 W. Avenue 43 & 4306 Glenmuir Avenue	Mt. Washington	
528	Dr. Franklin S. Whaley Residence		April 23, 1991	6434 Crescent Street	Garvanza	
529	Montecito View House		April 23, 1991	4115 Berenice Place	Montecito Heights	
533	Residence at 2660 Sichel Street		June 11, 1991	2660 Sichel Street	Lincoln Heights	
536	Eagle Rock Playground Clubhouse		July 2, 1991	1100 Eagle Vista Drive	Eagle Rock Designed by Richard Neutra in 1949.	
537	Eagle Rock Women's Twentieth Century Clubhouse		July 2, 1991	1841-1855 Colorado Bl/5101-5105 Hermosa Ave	Eagle Rock	
539	J.E. Maxwell Residence		July 19, 1991	211 S. Avenue 52	Highland Park	
540	Piper House (Los Angeles)		July 19, 1991	326 N. Avenue 53	Highland Park	Destroyed by fire: 08-20-1995
541	Reverend Williel Thomson Residence		July 19, 1991	215 S. Avenue 52	Highland Park	
542	Swanson House		July 2, 1991	2373 Addison Way	Eagle Rock	
549	Highland Theater Building		October 2, 1991	103 E. Avenue 56 & 5600-5608 N Figueroa	Highland Park	
550	A.J. Madison House		October 2, 1991	148-150 S. Avenue 56	Highland Park	
554	La Paloma (house)		March 18, 1992	357-369 N. Avenue 53 & 5300-5320 Granada St	Highland Park	
556	Charlie and Nettie Williams Home		April 21, 1992	212-214 N. Avenue 57	Highland Park	
558	Department of Water and Power Distributing Station No. 2		April 21, 1992	211-235 N. Avenue 61; 6100-6114 Mount Angelus Drive; 6112 Monte Vista Street	Highland Park	
562	Eagle Rock Women's Christian Temperence Union Home		May 26, 1992	2222-2244 Laverna Ave & 2225-2245 Norwalk Ave.; 2225-2245 Norwalk Ave & 2222-2244 Laverna Av	Eagle Rock	
564	E.A. Spencer Estate		August 25, 1992	5660 Ash Street	Highland Park	An American Foursquare style home designed by Charles C. Dodge in 1898
565	Charles H. Greenshaw Residence		August 25, 1992	1102-1114 Lantana Dr & 6371-7381 Rosswd Ter	Garvanza	
569	Van De Kamp's Holland Dutch Bakery		May 12, 1992	2900-2930 Fletcher Dr & 3016-3020 San Fernando Rd.	Glassell Park	Now house the satellite campus of Los Angeles City College.
575	Security Trust and Savings Bank (Highland Park Branch)		February 9, 1993	101-107 N. Avenue 56/5601-5603 N Figueroa St	Highland Park	
581	York Boulevard State Bank - Bank of America and Storefronts		August 10, 1993	1301-1313 N. Avenue 51 & 5057-5061 York Blvd	Highland Park	
582	W.F. Poor Resldence		August 10, 1993	120 N. Avenue 54	Highland Park	
585	Occidental College Hall of Letters Building (Savoy Apartments)		October 15, 1993	121 N. Avenue 50	Highland Park	Built in 1904 and designed by Oliver Perry Dennis and Lyman Farwell, this originally three storey, brick building is the only remaining principal structure from the Highland Park campus of Occidental College that was in use from 1897 until 1914.
587	Lincoln Heights Jail (Los Angeles City Jail)		November 30, 1993	401-449 N. Avenue 19	Lincoln Heights	
590	Brooklyn Avenue Neighborhood Corridor		March 8, 1994	Cesar E. Chavez Avenue	Boyle Heights	
611	Minister Residence		November 8, 1994	4151-4167 Sea View Drive & 4163 Sea View Ln	Mt. Washington	
612	Birtcher-Share Residence		November 8, 1994	4200-4216 Sea View Drive & 4234 Sea View Ln	Mt. Washington	
613	Scholfield House		November 8, 1994	4222-4230 Sea View Drive & 4252 Sea View Ln	Mt. Washington	
614	Wolford House		November 8, 1994	4242 Sea View Drive & 4260 Sea View Lane	Mt. Washington	Architect James DeLong designed this Usonian style house in 1951.
691	Carl C. Warden Residence		March 23, 2001	878 N. Rome Drive	Mt. Washington	1909, Meyer & Holler
692	Dahlia Motors Building		April 24, 2001	1627 W. Colorado Boulevard	Eagle Rock	
713	Santa Fe Coast Lines Hospital		January 3, 2006	610-30 S. Louis St. 34°2′16″N 118°12′31″W	Boyle Heights	Hospital built for employees of Santa Fe Railroad; later known as Linda Vista Hospital
717	Pilot House		July 30, 2002	735 Rome Drive	Mt. Washington	
734	Bell Commercial Block		October 29, 2002	1948-1958 West Colorado Blvd	Eagle Rock	
735	Jeffries House		October 29, 2002	571 Cypress Avenue	Cypress Park	
736	Monterey Trailer Park		November 5, 2002	6411 Monterey Rd	Hermon	
738	Alfred W. and Grace D. Hare Residence		November 22, 2002	2430 W Ridgeview Ave	Eagle Rock	
752	Hanson Puthuff House		April 29, 2003	5261 College View Ave	Eagle Rock	
753	H.W. Ayres House		April 29, 2003	3923 San Rafael Ave	Mt. Washington	
758	Keran Residence		July 29, 2003	2501 West Hill Dr	Eagle Rock	
760	Case Residence		July 29, 2003	2400 West Hill Dr	Eagle Rock	
771	J.L. Hodge Residence		December 16, 2003	5329 N Mt Royal Dr	Eagle Rock	
778	Murdock Residence		May 18, 2004	4219 N Figueroa St	Highland Park	
781	Mills Cottage		June 15, 2004	4746 Toland Way	Highland Park	
788	Sears, Roebuck & Company Mail Order Building		April 21, 2006	2650 E. Olympic Blvd. 34°1′24″N 118°13′15″W	Boyle Heights	1,800,000-square-foot (170,000 m^{2}) Sears mail order distribution center built in 1927; an iconic landmark of the Eastside
802	Hodel Residence and Tea House		June 1, 2005	6508, 6512, 6516 N. Monterey Rd; 6511, 6515, 6519 N. Short Way	Hermon	
807	Church of the Epiphany		June 15, 2005	2808 N Altura St	Lincoln Heights	Oldest operating Episcopal church in Los Angeles; Cesar Chavez gave speeches in the church hall and La Raza was printed in the church basement.
845	Mount Washington Hotel-Self Realization Fellowship International Headquarters		August 16, 2006	3880 & 3846 San Rafael Ave; 701 & 721 Mt. Washington Dr	Mt. Washington	
849	Nickel Leong Mansion		August 16, 2006	3509 E Thorpe Ave; 901 & 903 N Isabel St	Cypress Park	
877	Wilkins House		July 3, 2007	915-917 North Avenue 57	Highland Park	Built for John Wilkins in 1911; the house is emblematic of Craftsman style architecture.
889	McNary House		October 12, 2007	4777 Eagle Rock Blvd	Eagle Rock	
890	Waite Residence		October 12, 2007	2431 Hill Drive	Eagle Rock	
891	Boyle Hotel - Cummings Block		October 24, 2007	101-105 North Boyle Avenue; 1781-1785 East 1st Street	Boyle Heights	
894	Monroe Cottage		October 30, 2007	6310 Crescent St	Garvanza	
903	Washington Boulevard Bridge, No. 53C1375		January 30, 2008	E. Washington Boulevard between Soto St. and E. 23rd St.	Boyle Heights	
905	Sixth Street Bridge, No. 53C1880		January 30, 2008	E. 6th St. between Mateo St. and S. Boyle Ave.	Boyle Heights	Built in 1932, the 6th Street viaduct was demolished in 2016 due to concerns over seismic instability. A new replacement bridge will be built.
908	Riverside-Figueroa Bridge, No. 53C0160		January 30, 2008	Riverside Dr between Barclay St and N San Fernando Rd	Cypress Park	Demolished in 2015
931	Castle Crag (house)		July 29, 2008	5027 El Verano Avenue	Eagle Rock	Queen Anne-style early Pioneer residence structure
944	Hermon Car Wall		January 28, 2009	400 former block Pullman Ave. (east of Monterey Rd.); 34°6′2.19″N 118°11′20.12″W	Hermon	Also called "The Model T Wall". In the style of Antoni Gaudí, Albert Emmanuel Sederquist from 1932 to the 1940s built this retaining wall sculpture with parts of cars and a schoolhouse destroyed in an earthquake. When designated, one of three folk art LAHCM's, along with #15 Watts Towers and #184 Tower of Wooden Pallets (demolished).
951	James F. Real Studio Office		April 22, 2009	77 Patrician Way; 34°8′33.31″N 118°10′57.1″W	Eagle Rock	Late Modern, first "Thin Shell" type in L.A., 1958.
982	Gless Farmhouse			131 S. Boyle St.	Boyle Heights	Queen Anne style, 1887.
989	Coons Residence		October 5, 2010	2071 W. Escarpa Drive	Eagle Rock	Two-story Spanish Colonial Revival style home for Arthur Coons, the President of Occidental College from 1946 to 1965.
1004	Richard Henry Dana Branch Library		September 14, 2011	3320 Pepper Street	Cypress Park	Los Angeles branch library built in 1926, designed in the Georgian Revival Style by architect Harry Sims Bent. Named for author of Two Years Before the Mast.
1009	Heritage Square Museum		December 16, 2011	3800 Homer Street	Montecito Heights, Lincoln Heights	Established in 1969, Heritage Square is the home of eight historic buildings, train cars and a 1920s pharmacy.
1017	Young-Gribling Residence		April 25, 2012	3320 N. Griffin Avenue	Lincoln Heights	Built in 1885, this Victorian house was designed by the architect Robert Brown Young for his brother, A. J. From 1902 until 1954 it was the home of building contractor Arthur Gribling and his wife, Mabel.
1233	Centro de Arte Público		August 24, 2021	5605–5607 N. Figueroa Street	Highland Park	

== Non-HCM historic sites recognized by state and nation ==
Code	Landmark name	Image	Date designated	Locality	Neighborhood	Description
2447	Binford Residence			2200-2212 Eastlake Ave. & 3201 Baldwin St.	Lincoln Heights	
2454	Schliebitz Residence			2063 Griffin Ave.	Lincoln Heights	
2455	Nicol Residence			2309 Hancock St.	Lincoln Heights	
2456	Lemberger - Sigler Residence			2800 Manitou Ave.	Lincoln Heights	
2457	Todd Residence			2808 Manitou Ave.	Lincoln Heights	
2458	Stoltenberg Residence			2901-2907 Manitou Ave.	Lincoln Heights	
2460	Olin Residence			2622-2624 Mozart St.	Lincoln Heights	
2475	Girard-Vai Residence			2113-2113 1/2 Parkside Ave.	Lincoln Heights	
2476	Clark-Doody Residence			2139-2141 Parkside Ave.	Lincoln Heights	
2502	Richard Henry Dana Branch Library			3320 Pepper Ave.	Cypress Park	This former Los Angeles Public Library branch was built in 1926 and was designed by architect Harry S. Bent in the Georgian Revival style.
2537	Foyen Residence			2242 Workman St.	Lincoln Heights	

== See also ==
- Bibliography of Los Angeles
- Outline of the history of Los Angeles
- Bibliography of California history

=== Lists of L.A. Historic-Cultural Monuments ===
- Historic-Cultural Monuments in Downtown Los Angeles
- Historic-Cultural Monuments in the Harbor area
- Historic-Cultural Monuments in Hollywood
- Historic-Cultural Monuments in the San Fernando Valley
- Historic-Cultural Monuments in Silver Lake, Angelino Heights, and Echo Park
- Historic-Cultural Monuments in South Los Angeles
- Historic-Cultural Monuments on the Westside
- Historic-Cultural Monuments in the Wilshire and Westlake areas

=== Other ===
- City of Los Angeles' Historic Preservation Overlay Zones
- National Register of Historic Places listings in Los Angeles
- National Register of Historic Places listings in Los Angeles County
- List of California Historical Landmarks
