= Lester S. Moore =

American architect

- Born: September 1871; Topeka, Kansas
- Died: October 11, 1924 (aged 53); Los Angeles, California
- Occupation: Architect

Lester Sherwood Moore (1871–1924) was an American architect.

Moore designed residential homes and other buildings in the early 20th century. He was based in Los Angeles, California, United States, and is credited for being one of the first to recognize and appreciate Mission Style as a worthy architectural form. Moore's office was located in the Tajo Building, #307, at the NW corner of First and Broadway in Los Angeles.

== Biography ==
Moore, born in Topeka, Kansas in September 1871, was the second of five children born to Douglas J. and Cynthia A. Moore. His father, a farmer, painter and occasional huckster, was a Canadian immigrant who fought with the 11th Kansas Cavalry during the American Civil War, but did not become a naturalized citizen of the United States until 1886. He enlisted in the war as a private, but was a corporal before the war's end. Moore's mother was born in Illinois.

After moving to California, Moore married Anna "Belle" Russ in Los Angeles on June 6, 1894. Initially the two lived with Anna's parents, John and Louise Russ, but subsequently moved to 3301 Griffin Ave, Los Angeles. They had two children. Dorothy L. Moore was born in 1901 and Barbara M. Moore was born in 1906. Around 1918 Moore and his family moved to Kern County, where he worked for the CCM (Chanslor-Canfield Midway) Oil Company as a Geologic Engineer. Moore died in Los Angeles on October 11, 1924, at the age of 53. The 1930 Federal Census shows his wife Anna, and Daughter Barbara, were back living in Los Angeles with Anna's mother, who was now living at their old address on Griffin Ave.

== Work ==
One of Moore's notable achievements is the "Montecito View House" (1909) which was declared Los Angeles Historic Cultural Monument #529 on April 23, 1991. This 1909 house is a 1½ story California bungalow in the Craftsman style overlooking the Arroyo Seco from Montecito Heights, and is located at 4115 Berenice Place, Los Angeles. Another was the Colonial Revival style "Reeves House" (1905) at 219 N. Avenue 53, in Highland Park, California, which was declared Los Angeles Historic Cultural Monument #380 on July 15, 1988, but was destroyed by fire on October 10, 2017. He also designed the Thomas J. Washburn House (1911) which was purchased in 1941 by Hattie McDaniel, the first black actress to win an Academy Award when she won the Best Supporting Actress Oscar for her role as Mammy in Gone with the Wind.

Moore became associated with Riverside, California when he submitted plans for a new Riverside County courthouse in 1902. Moore did not win the contract, but he did subsequently design a number of homes and other structures in Riverside. Many of the Riverside homes Moore designed were located in the somewhat exclusive area now known as the Rubidoux Heights Historic District, which included one section commonly referred to as "Banker's Row".

== List of structures designed by Lester S. Moore ==
Year built	Style	Location	Structure Name & Details	Ref Source
UNK		South Pasadena, CA	J. A. Hobert House; Built before 1911	
UNK	Bungalow	San Marino, CA	The Hart Bungalow; Built before 1911	
UNK		Los Angeles	Apartment Building at W. 6th St; Built around 1900	USC Digital Archives
UNK		Pasadena, CA	A. Truenan House, 5201 Pasadena Ave, Pasadena, CA	LA Planning Document
1903	Beaux-Arts	2433 N. Broadway, Lincoln Heights, Los Angeles, CA	Eastgate Masonic Temple (Building severely altered in early 1970s)	Los Angeles Times
1903		Montebello, CA (aka Newmark, CA)	Mrs. G. Reeves-Collins House	
1905	Colonial Revival	219 N. Avenue 53, Highland Park, Los Angeles, CA	Reeves House; Los Angeles Historic Cultural Monument #380 (Destroyed by fire on October 10, 2017)	Los Angeles OHR
1908	Craftsman	3587 Mount Rubidoux Dr, Riverside, CA	William B. Clancy Residence;Riverside Structure of Merit #350; Mt Rubidoux Historic District	
1909	Craftsman	4115 Berenice Place, Los Angeles	The Montecito View House; Los Angeles Historic Cultural Monument #529	Los Angeles OHR
1909	Spanish-Mediterranean Revival	3563 Mount Rubidoux Dr, Riverside, CA	Stanley J. Castleman Residence; Riverside Structure of Merit #349; Mt Rubidoux Historic District	
1909	Craftsman	4540 University Ave, Riverside, CA	M. B. Sleeper House; Riverside Structure of Merit #230; Mt Rubidoux Historic District	
1909	Craftsman	4522 Indian Hill Rd, Riverside, CA	A.M. Pier Residence; Riverside Structure of Merit #361; Mt Rubidoux Historic District	
1910	Craftsman	4555 Mission Inn Ave, Riverside, CA	Residence of Isaac Logan; Riverside City Structure of Merit #339; Mount Rubidoux Historic District; Seventh St Historic District	
1910	Craftsman	3511 Mount Rubidoux Dr, Riverside, CA	W. T. Dinsmore Residence; Riverside City Structure of Merit #347; Mount Rubidoux Historic District	
1910	Craftsman	4526 University Ave, Riverside, CA	W.P. Danchy Residence; Riverside City Structure of Merit #169; Mount Rubidoux Historic District	
1910	Craftsman	3471 Redwood Dr, Riverside, CA	M.J. Wade Residence; Riverside City Structure of Merit #359; Mount Rubidoux Historic District	
1910	Craftsman/California Bungalow	2041 Arroyo Dr, Riverside, CA	A.D. Shamel House	
1910	Craftsman	335 Monterey Rd, South Pasadena, CA	Ezra & Ida Thompsan Residence	
1911	Mediterranean Revival	2203 South Harvard Boulevard, Los Angeles	Thomas J. Washburn House	
1911		4625 Glenwood Dr, Riverside, CA	Bigelow's Bungalow	
1911		4495 Fifth St, Riverside, CA	The Phillips House	
1912	Mission Revival	? San Andreas Ave, Riverside, CA	The University of Riverside Citrus Exp Station	
1912		814 South Flower St; Los Angeles	Pierce Brothers and Company Funeral Home	
1912	Prairie	3783 & 3811 Mount Rubidoux Dr, Riverside, CA	LeRoy and LaMonte Simms Houses (twins); Riverside City Structure of Merit #353 and 354; Mt Rubidoux Historic District	
1912	Craftsman	4509 University, Riverside, CA	The Harry Stewart House	
1912	Craftsman	4495 Fifth St, Riverside, CA	Residence of Nora A. Philips; Coloney Heights Historic District	
1913	Italianate Craftsman	2835 Holliston Ave, Altadena, CA	The Richard and Mabelle Hill House	Zillow.com
1913	Craftsman, river rock	Big Santa Anita Canyon, CA	Sierra Club's Muir Lodge; Destroyed by flood in March 1938	
1913		Wilmington, Los Angeles	Calvary Presbyterian Church	
1913		Buena Vista and Florida Ave, Hemet, CA	Hemet Public Library - The Carnegie Library (razed 1969)	
1914	Craftsman/American Foursquare	4477 University Ave, Riverside, CA	The Hugh Craig House; Evergreen Quarter Historic District	
1915	Mediterranean Revival	4495 Mission Inn Ave, Riverside, CA	Residence of Robert J. Lutz; Colony Heights Historic District, Seventh St Historic District	
1917	Prairie	3354 Orange St, Riverside, CA	E.E. Stewart Residence; Riverside City Structure of Merit #538; Heritage Square Historic District	
1917	Mediterranean Revival	4541 Mission Inn Ave, Riverside, CA (Orig. 1541 Seventh St)	Residence of Mary E. Brehm; Riverside City Structure of Merit #338; Mount Rubidoux Historic District; Seventh St Historic District	
