= Los Angeles Railway Huron Substation =

Former electrical substation in Los Angeles

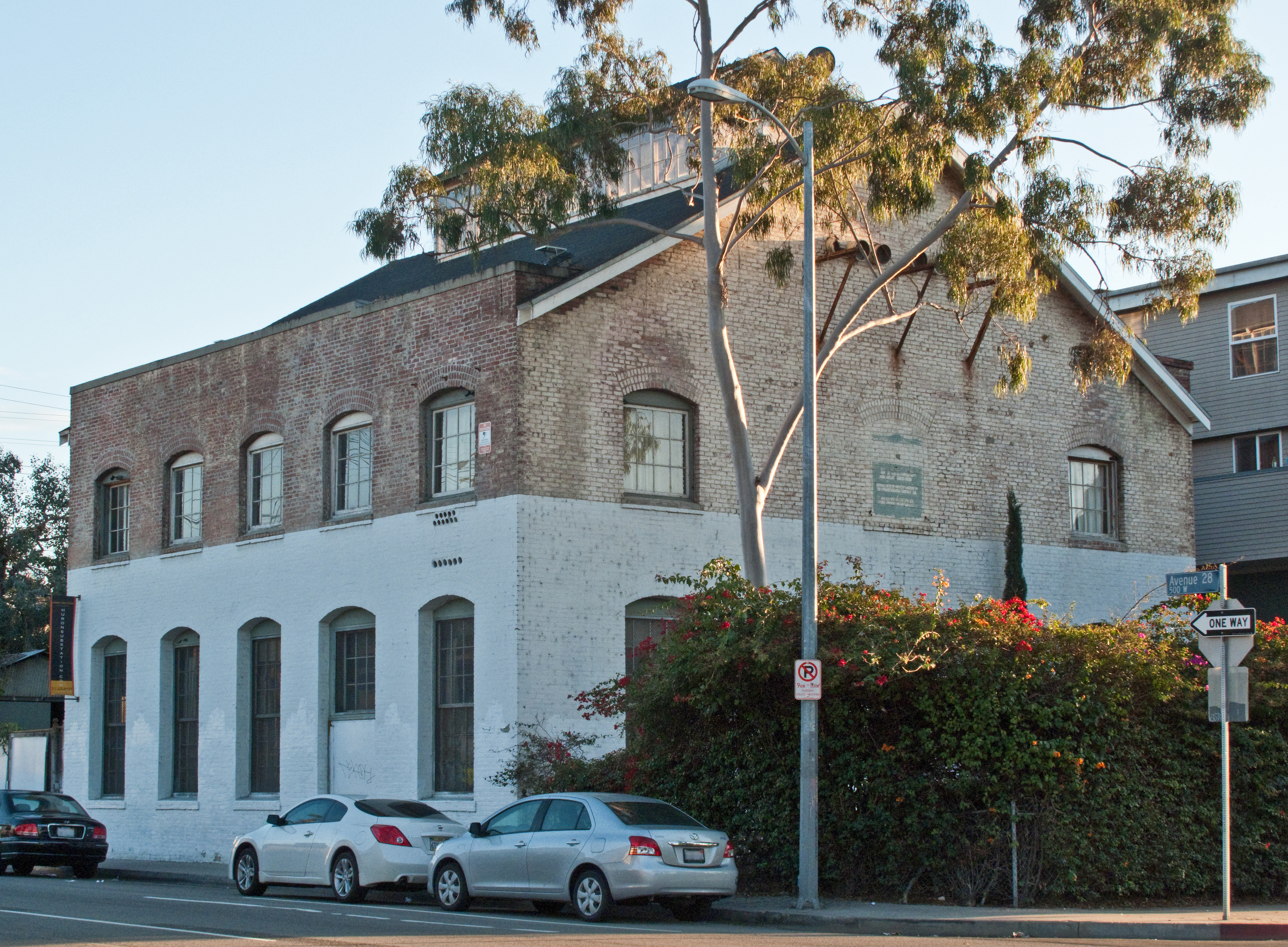
Exterior View

The Huron Substation is a former electrical substation in Los Angeles, California, United States. Built between 1906 and 1908 and designed by Edward S Cobb, the substation converted AC current to DC current for the nearby Los Angeles Railway Yellow Cars. Located in the Cypress Park neighborhood of Los Angeles, the site was declared a Historic-Cultural Monument (number 404) in 1988. The site is currently an event venue that has been featured in numerous film and television productions.

The Huron Substation is the second oldest remaining substation of its kind in Los Angeles. Shortly before the Yellow Cars ceased operation, the City of Los Angeles sold the building in the 1950s. The building has served many uses since then, including a signal manufacturing plant and welding shop. After it was designated as a Historic-Cultural Monument, the site was victim to a fire and was later purchased by a furniture designer who renovated the building. The building was sold again in 2005 and served as a residence and event space. in 2019, the building was listed for sale again; it is unclear if the building was sold. The building currently serves as an event space and filming location, notable productions that have featured the substation include: The Fast and the Furious, NCIS: New Orleans, and Malibu's Most Wanted.

The Metro A Line Lincoln/Cypress Station is nearby, and the route uses Right-Of-Way previously used by the Yellow Cars which were powered by this substation.
