= Los Angeles and Mount Washington Railway =

Defunct incline railway (1909–1919)

Coordinates: 34.0953°N 118.2098°W

Vintage postcard of the Los Angeles and Mount Washington Railway Company base station.

The Los Angeles and Mount Washington Railway Company was an early 20th-century incline railway which once operated in what is today known as the Mount Washington and Highland Park neighborhoods north of Downtown Los Angeles in the Northeast LA area.

Inspired by nearby Angels Flight on Hill Street in Downtown Los Angeles, the railway entered service in May 1909 to promote the area as a hillside suburb. Built by developer Robert Marsh, the "L.A. & Mt. Washington Ry. Co." had of a pair of electrically powered, counterbalanced trolley-style cars connected to an underground steel cable loop running the length of Avenue 43—then a dirt road—to Marsh's Mount Washington Hotel at the 940 ft summit.

The rail cars' speed was 4 mph (6.4 km/h). At the top of the railway, visitors enjoyed at that time an as yet-unspoiled vista of the surrounding landscape, stretching east from the nearby San Gabriel Mountains and west to the Pacific Ocean. The ride became popular, operating until midnight on weekends. However, worn equipment and concerns over safety led to its final closure in 1919. By 1930, Avenue 43 had been paved into a street for automobiles and the railway tracks and equipment had long since been removed.

The Mount Washington Hotel remains, having been purchased by the Self-Realization Fellowship in 1925. It was declared Historic Monument #845 by the City of Los Angeles on August 16, 2006.

The base station of the LA&MWRC is also still standing. Currently located at 200 W Avenue 43, Los Angeles, CA 90065, the cable car station overlooks the Metro A Line just south of the Southwest Museum stop in the Highland Park neighborhood of Northeast LA. The base station on Avenue 43 was declared Historic Monument #269 in 1983.
