= Grit bin =

Roadside container for a mixture of salt and grit

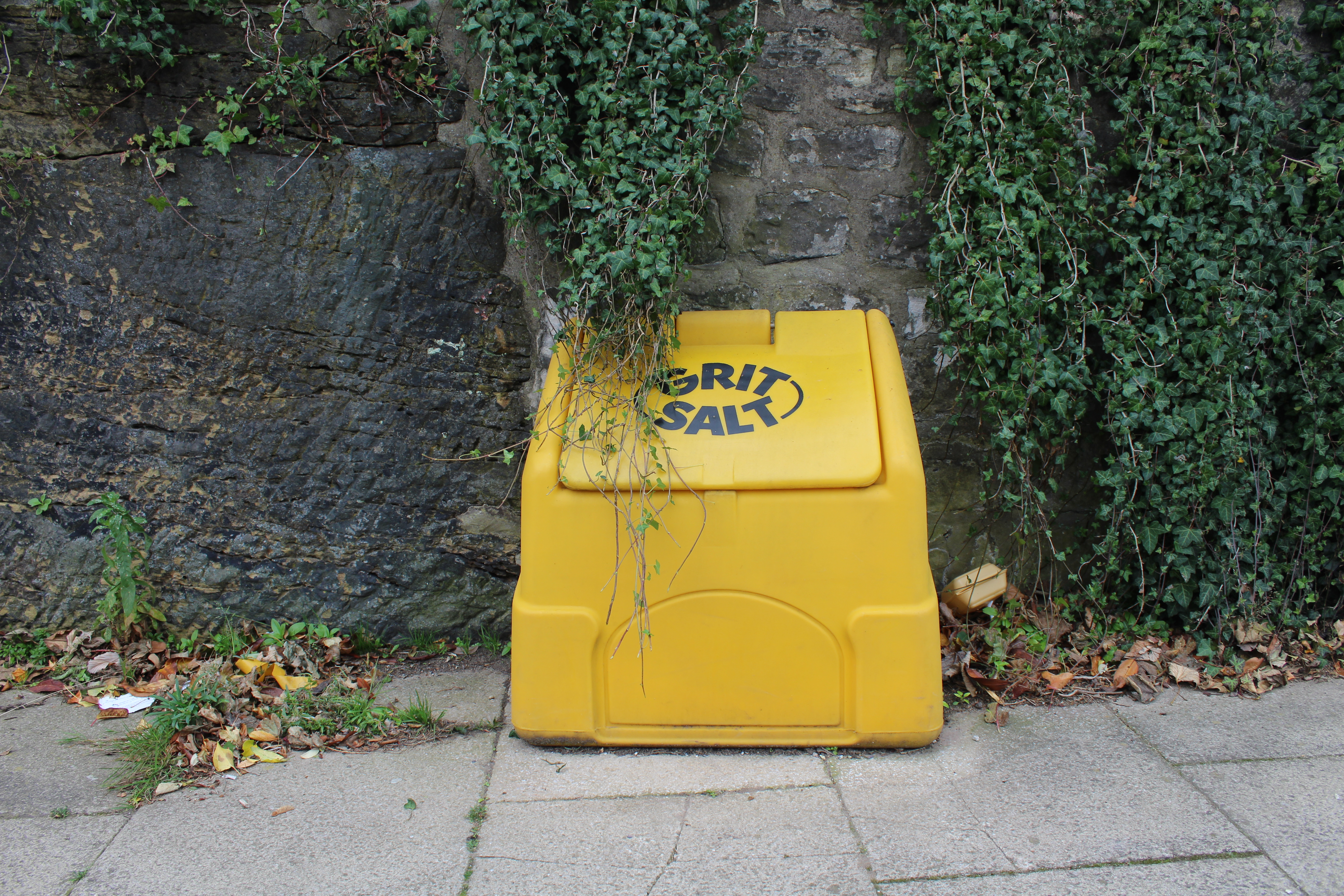
A grit bin made from fibreglass

A grit bin, salt bin or sand bin is an item of street furniture, commonly found in countries where freezing temperatures and snowfall occur, which holds a mixture of salt and grit that is spread over roads if they have snow or ice on them. Spreading rock salt over roads and pathways is commonly done either by hand or with a winter service vehicle and helps improve road safety in frosty conditions. The salt helps reduce the freezing temperature of the ice, which can be effective in temperatures of up to -9°C (16°F). Roads that are not gritted during winter are much more dangerous for vehicles and foot traffic, so busy routes can be gritted several times per day under harsh snowy conditions.

== How it works ==
Anyone may use a grit bin to clear a public path or road, though they are generally not intended for personal use. Typically, a spade or shovel is used to spread a thin layer of grit onto the road surface, covering any snow or ice. The salt lowers the melting point of the snow causing it to melt (see sodium chloride). The grit component improves the friction between a vehicle's tires and the road.

Some grit bins have a small compartment, which could be used for storing a spade or shovel. The one featured in the photograph at the top of the page is filled through the top hatch.

The salt boxes of Baltimore, Maryland, United States, have been in use since at least 1969, and have attracted attention on social media as a symbol of Baltimore culture.

In Sweden, the bins contain mainly sand and sometimes sand mixed with salt. The construction and appearance of the bins are similar to bins in other countries.

== Construction of grit bins ==
A prefab concrete bin that has been replaced by a plastic one

Grit bins were originally made of concrete, wood or even stone, though these are now increasingly being replaced by models constructed from plastic partly from safety concerns: vehicles/people hitting a plastic grit bin will suffer less damage. However, the lower weight of plastic makes grit bins easier to steal or tip over.

== Problems ==
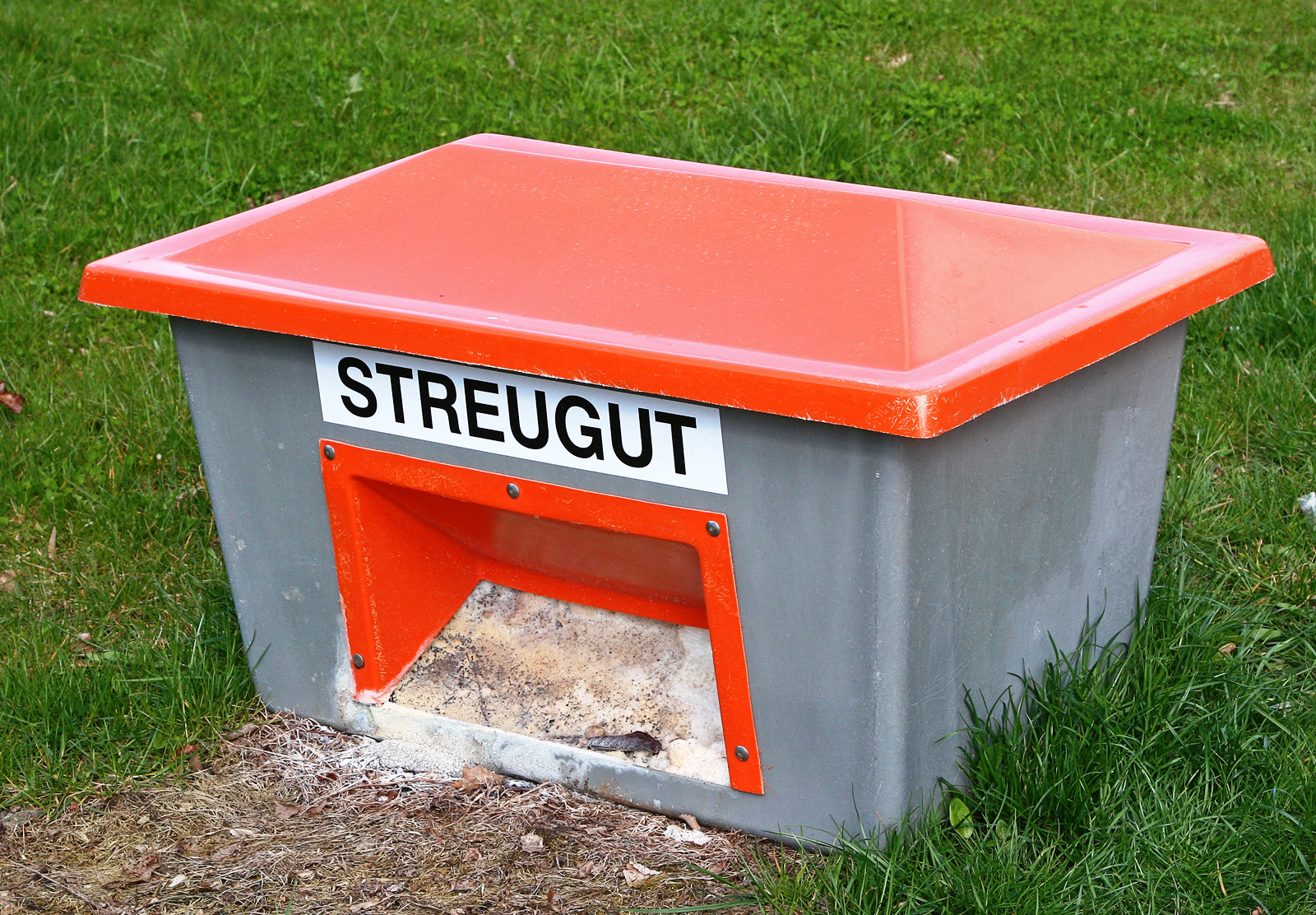
German grit bin

Grit bins can be subjected to vandalism, such as arson. The lid can also be left open, leaving rain to dilute the rock salt in the mixture, leaving it much less effective than dry rock salt. In the United Kingdom, the local county council is usually responsible for maintaining and refilling grit bins as well as spreading rock salt on the roads.

In Norway, the problem with tipping grit bins over has been solved by making them large enough to hold about 500 kg (1,100 lb) of grit, and to continually keep it topped up.
