= Longfellow–Hastings House =

Historic house in California, United States

- U.S. National Register of Historic Places
- Los Angeles Historic-Cultural Monument
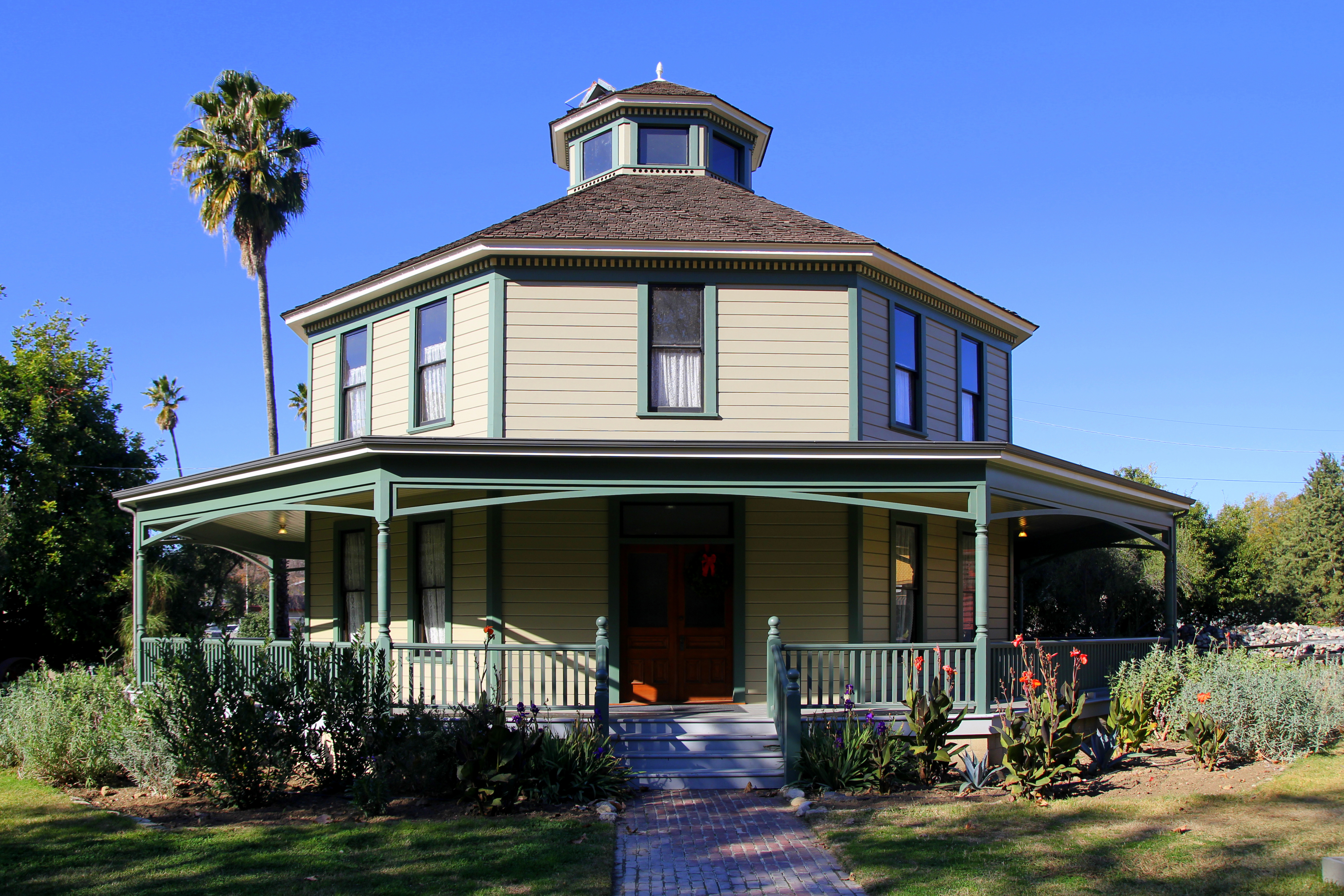

- Location within the Los Angeles metropolitan area Location within California Location within the United States
- Location: Heritage Square Museum, Highland Park, Los Angeles, California
- Coordinates: 34°8′40″N 118°6′45″W
- Built: 1893
- Architect: Gilbert Longfellow
- Architectural style: Octagon house
- NRHP reference No.: 82002197
- LAHCM No.: 413

Significant dates
- Added to NRHP: March 2, 1982
- Designated LAHCM: January 20, 1989

The Longfellow–Hastings House, also known as the Octagon House, is an historic octagon house that was located at 85 South Allen Avenue in Pasadena, California. The house was built in 1893 by Gilbert Longfellow, who had previously built a similar house on the Atlantic coast. The two-story house has a frieze and a dentilated cornice and was originally surrounded by a verandah. It is one of the few octagon houses remaining in the Western United States.

The house was added to the National Register of Historic Places on March 2, 1982. It is now located at the Heritage Square Museum, its home since the mid-1980s.
