= Heritage Square Museum =

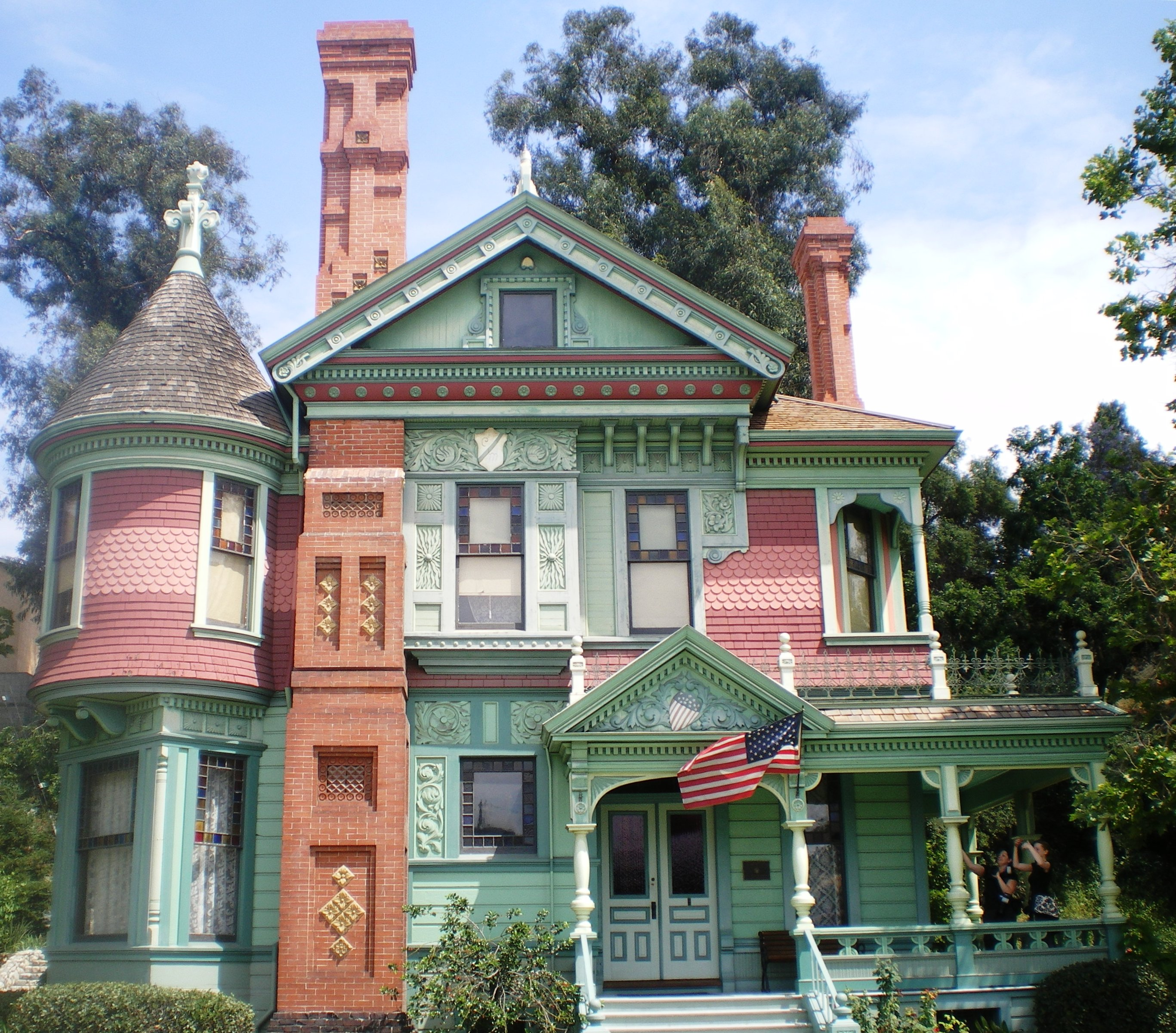
- Hale House, Heritage Square Museum, Los Angeles
- Established: 1969
- Location: 3800 Homer Street; Montecito Heights; Los Angeles, California
- Coordinates: 34°05′17.30″N 118°12′29.89″W
- Type: Historic house museum
- Public transit access: Heritage Square
- Website: heritagesquare.org

Heritage Square Museum is a living history and open-air architecture museum located beside the Arroyo Seco Parkway in the Montecito Heights neighborhood of Los Angeles, California, in the southern Arroyo Seco area. The living history museum shows the story of development in Southern California through historical architectural examples.

The museum focuses on interpreting the years 1850 to 1950, a century of unprecedented growth in Los Angeles. Volunteer interpreters give thorough tours that incorporate the history, architecture, and culture of the region. Other specialized living history events, lectures, and items of historical interest are given on a periodic basis.

== History ==
During the rapid urban expansion of the 1960s, Victorian buildings in Los Angeles were being demolished at an alarming rate. The Los Angeles Historic-Cultural Monument program, established in 1961, could evaluate properties and list-register them, but not protect them. In 1969, at the request of the Los Angeles Cultural Heritage Commission, a group of concerned citizens established the Cultural Heritage Foundation to counteract this destruction. The Foundation organized Heritage Square as a last-chance haven for architecturally and historically significant buildings to be moved to, which otherwise would have been demolished at their original locations.

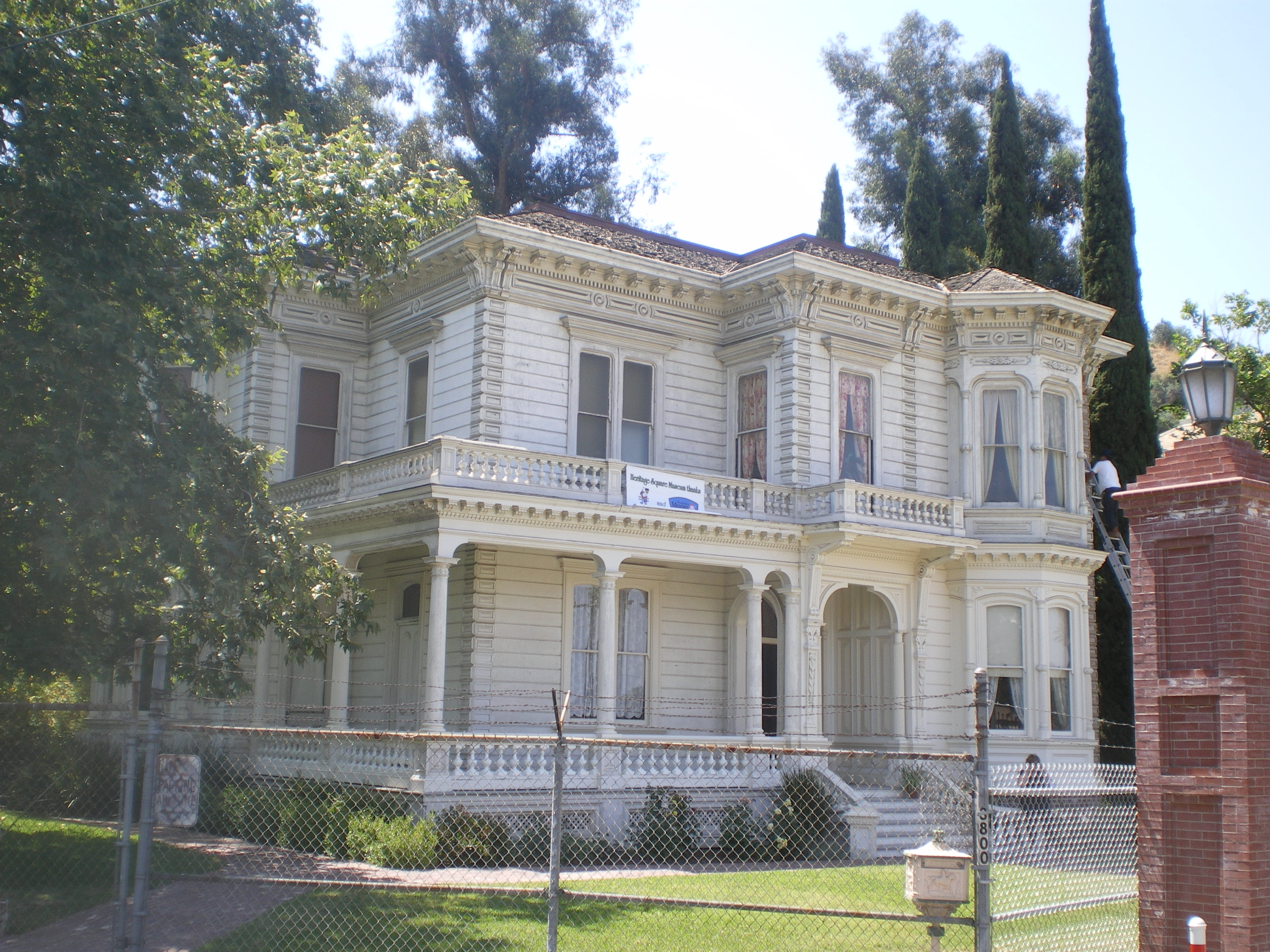
Mount Pleasant House

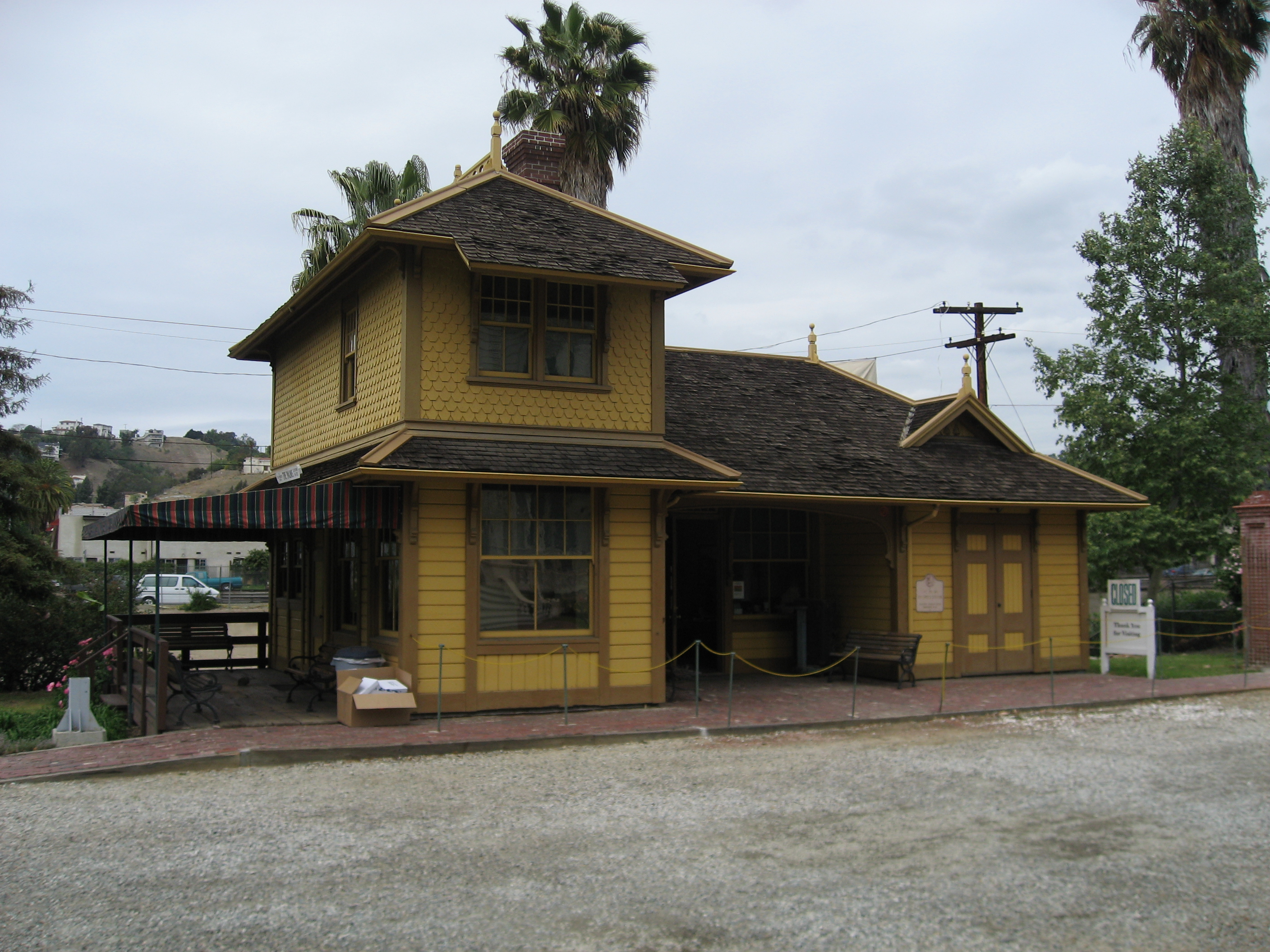
The 1875 Palms Depot, in new Heritage Square setting

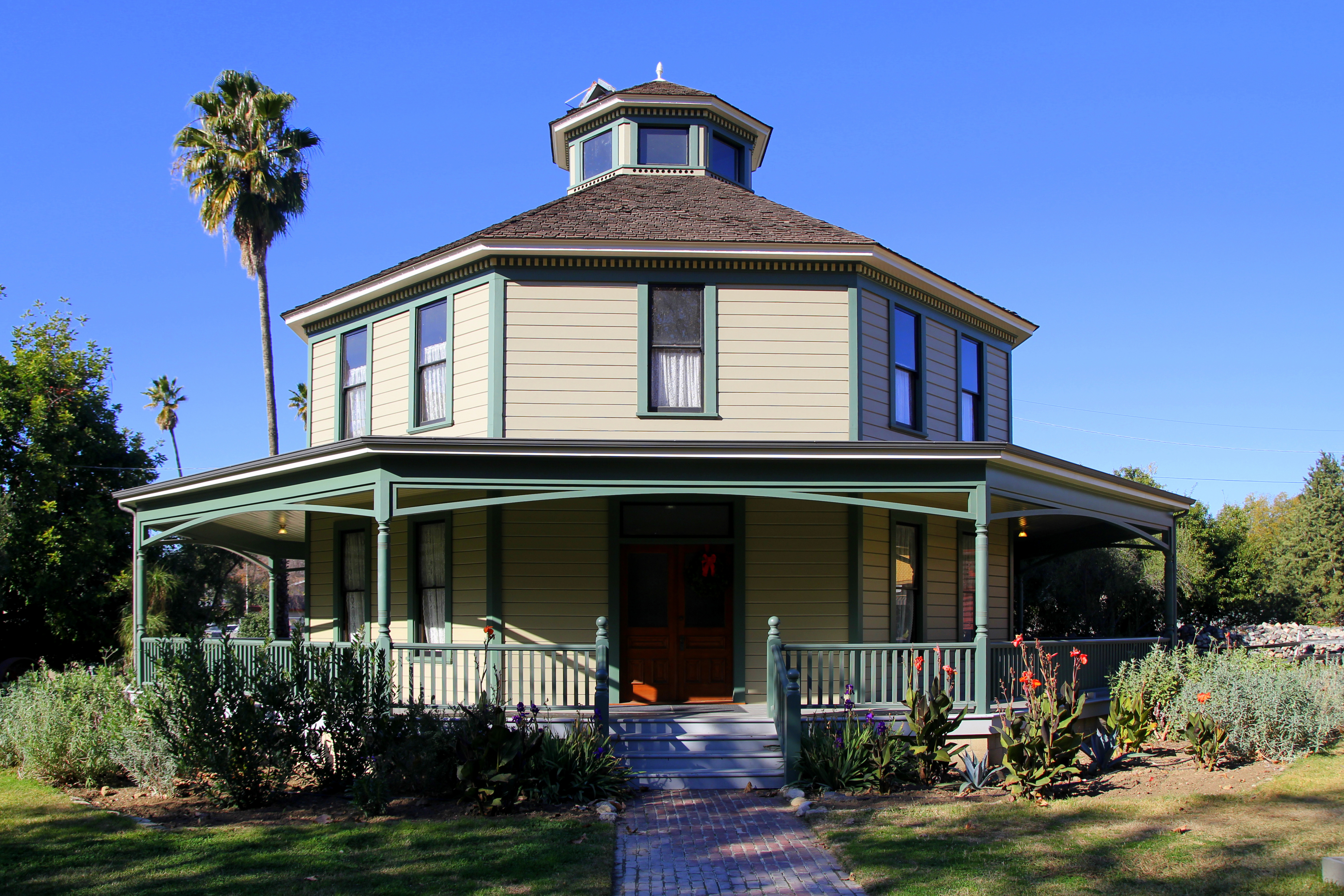
Longfellow-Hastings Octagon House

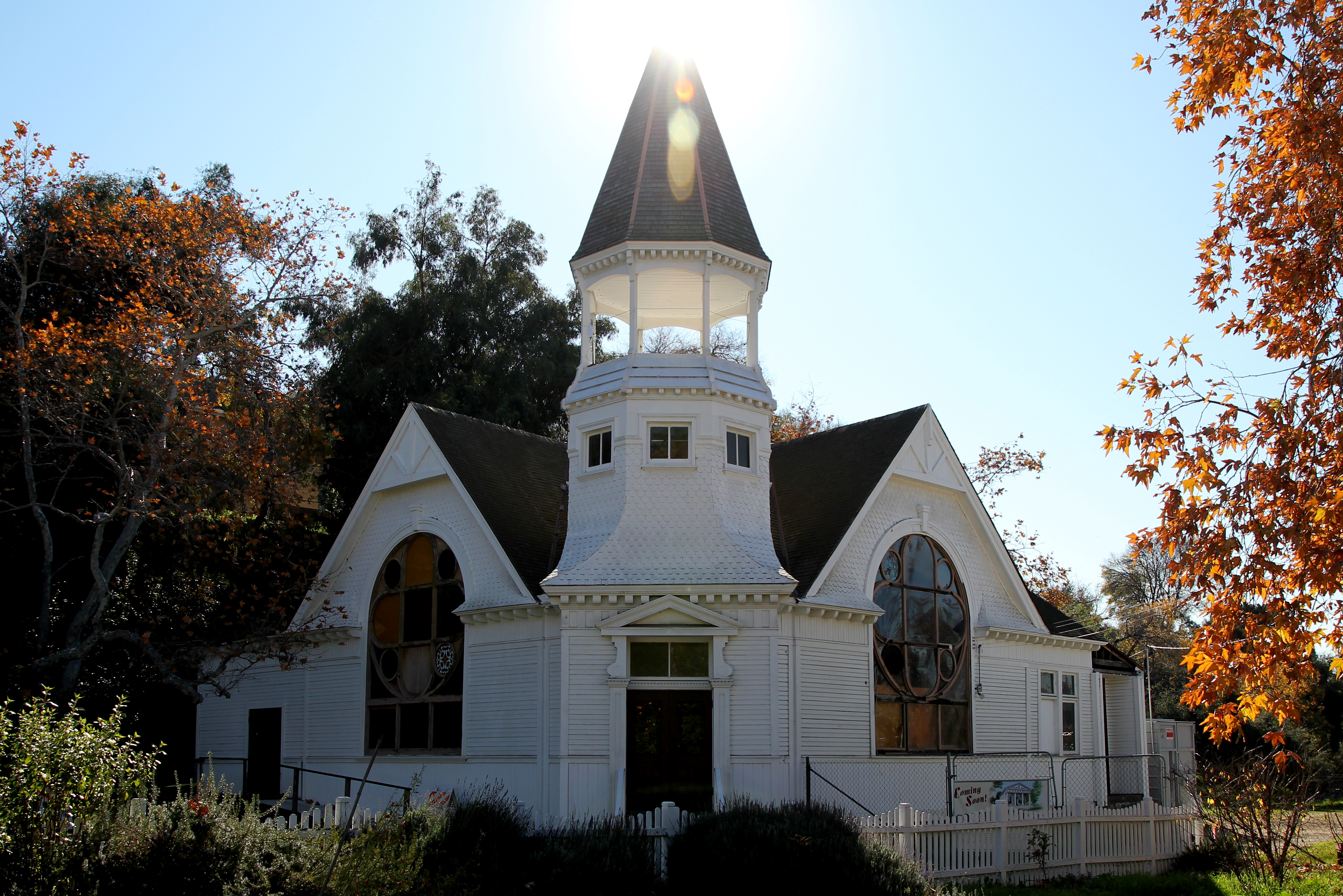
Lincoln Avenue Methodist Church

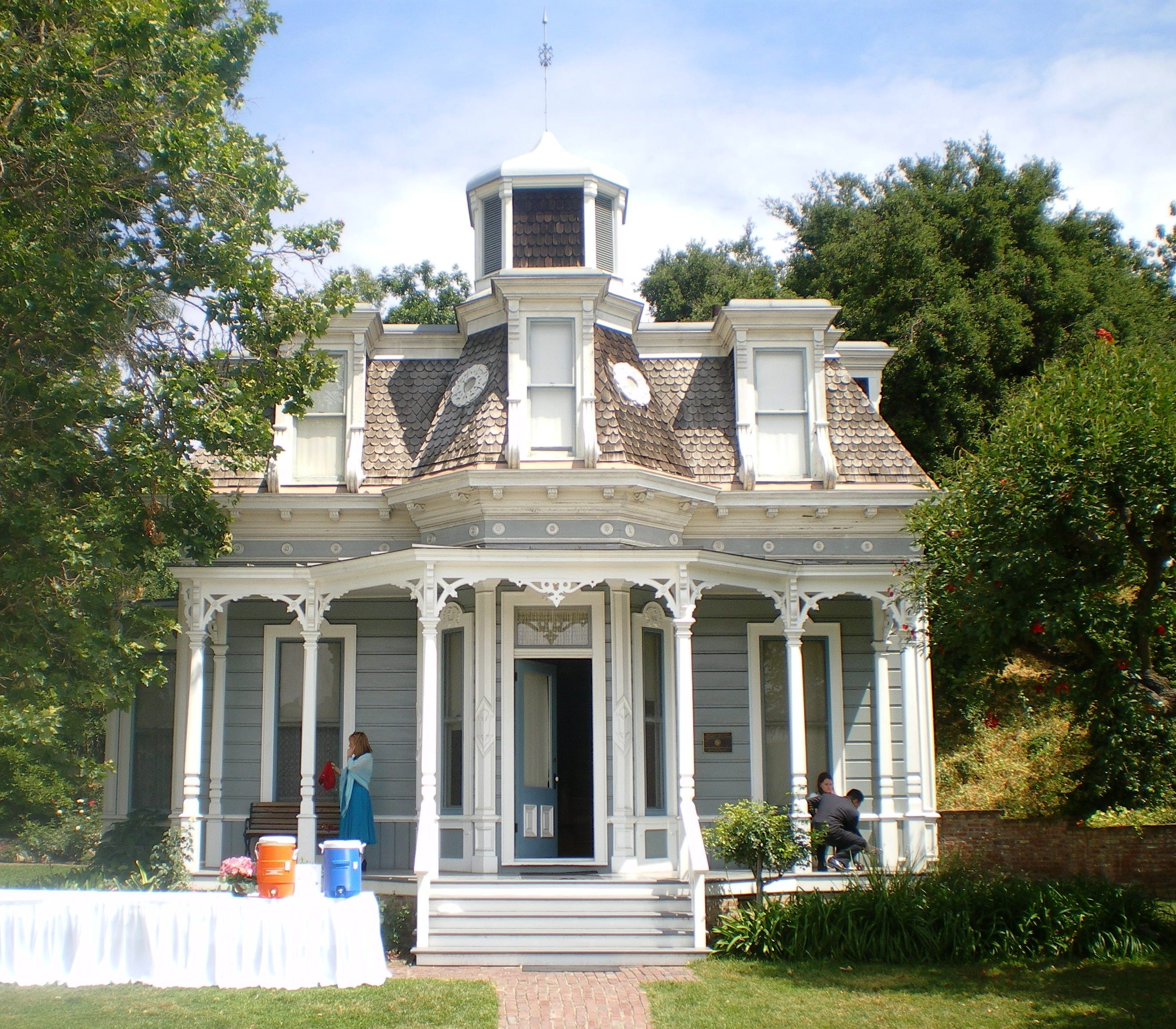
Valley Knudsen Garden Residence — Shaw House.

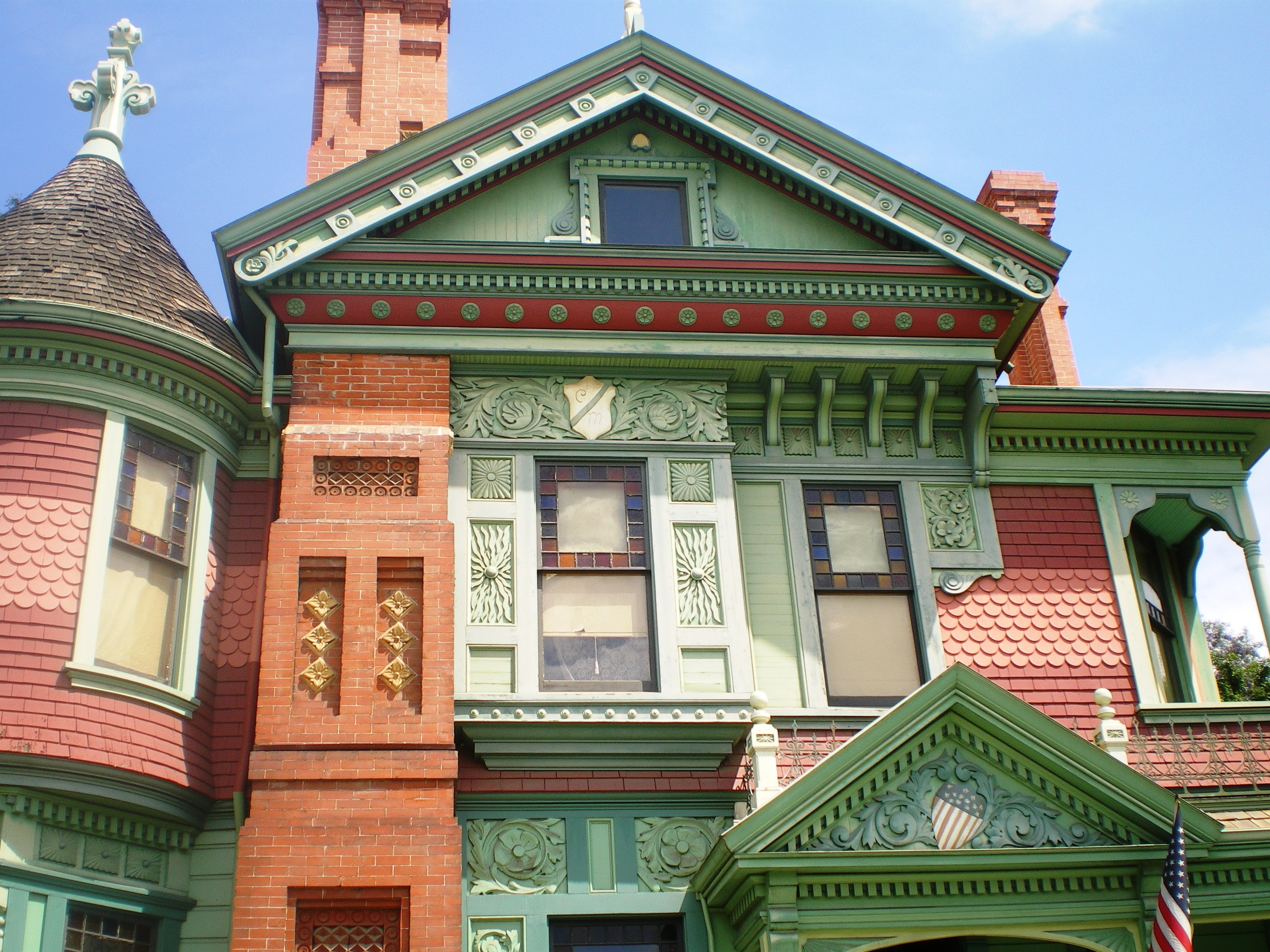
The Hale House facade.

== Buildings collection ==
Eight historic buildings, and a vintage train car and a trolley car, were stopped from demolition and moved to the Heritage Square location between 1969 and 2005. They include:

=== Mt. Pleasant House ===
The Mount Pleasant House was built in 1876 by prominent businessman and lumber baron William Hayes Perry. Designed by renowned architect Ezra F. Kysor, the home contains detailing to convey the wealth and social status of the family. These elements include Corinthian columns, fine hardwood floors, a sweeping main staircase, and marble fireplace mantles. It was built in the fashionable neighborhood (in the 19th century) of Boyle Heights. The Perry's Mount Pleasant House was considered the finest and most expensive residence to arrive in mid-1870s Los Angeles.

The outward sweep of the entrance stairway, the sculpted brackets under the eaves, the slanted bay windows, and the narrow Corinthian columns are characteristic of its Victorian Italianate style. In 1975, the house was moved from 1315 Mount Pleasant Street to the museum grounds, and restoration was begun by the Colonial Dames Society of America.

=== The Palms Depot ===
The Palms Depot was built c. 1875 for the Los Angeles and Independence Railroad, and was later absorbed into the Pacific Electric Railway in 1911. It continued to provide service until 1953. The Palms Depot was declared a Los Angeles Historic-Cultural Monument in 1963, and to avoid demolition was moved to the museum grounds.

=== Longfellow-Hastings Octagon House ===
One of only about 500 octagonal buildings remaining in the United States, the octagon house has a unique story. The type is based on the mid-19th century ideas of Orson Squire Fowler, that eight-sided homes were preferable to the standard four-sided type. The builders of octagonal structures believed that: windows on eight sides gave more light and better air circulation (lowering heating expense in winter and cooler in summer); and that they were easier and less expensive to construct. Fowler's architectural ideas were popular in the East through the 1850s, where most octagonal structures and homes were built. After the Civil War interest waned in the octagonal style. This octagon house is unusual being built later, in 1893. It was built by Gilbert Longfellow at 3800 Homer Street, L.A. It was declared a Los Angeles Historic-Cultural Monument (# 413), and was moved to the museum grounds.

=== The John J. Ford House ===
The Ford House was built in 1887 as part of a large tract of simple middle-class homes in downtown Los Angeles built by the Beaudry Brothers. The home is particularly interesting because of its inhabitant – John J. Ford, a well-known wood carver. Ford's works include carvings for the California State Capitol, the Iolani Palace in Hawaii, and Leland Stanford's private railroad car. Because of his occupation, the exterior and interior carvings were all done by hand in ornate, one-of-a-kind patterns.

=== Lincoln Avenue Methodist Church ===
The Lincoln Avenue Methodist Church was built in 1897, located at 732 North Orange Grove Boulevard in Pasadena. Designed in the Carpenter Gothic and Queen Anne styles, the floor plan also follows the Methodist tradition of non-axial plans. This plan, with the entrance in one corner and the pulpit in the opposite, is known as the Akron style, having originated in Akron, Ohio.

=== Carriage Barn ===
The carriage barn was built in 1899 on the grounds of what is now Pasadena's Huntington Memorial Hospital for Dr. Osborne, a member of the hospital's staff. Its architectural style is Queen Anne Cottage with Gothic Revival influences. It has three gables and a distinctive pitched roof. The barn was saved from demolition and moved to the Heritage Square Museum in 1981.

=== Valley Knudsen Garden Residence — Shaw House ===
A unique style for the West Coast, the Shaw House is a Second Empire home with a French mansard roof. It is of a smaller scale than the Hale and Perry Houses.

=== Hale House ===
The Hale House was built in 1887 by George W. Morgan, a land speculator and real estate developer, at the foot of Mount Washington just a few blocks from the museum in Highland Park in Los Angeles. The building is an outstanding example of the Queen Anne and Eastlake styles.

The house was sold many times and was moved from 4501 to 4425 North Pasadena Avenue (now Figueroa Street) before being purchased by James G. Hale in 1906. It remained in the Hale Family until it was acquired by the museum in 1970, as a Los Angeles Historic-Cultural Monument (No. 40). The exterior colors of Hale House were reproduced from chips of the original colors found on the house during restoration. The interior has been restored to represent the rooms as they may have appeared in 1899.

=== The Salt Box ===
The Salt Box was one of the last homes on Bunker Hill, and one of the first moved to the Heritage Square Museum grounds. It was of the Saltbox style. Shortly after its arrival, an arson fire destroyed it. It has a place of remembrance as a Los Angeles Historic-Cultural Monument.

== See also ==
- List of Los Angeles Historic-Cultural Monuments on the East and Northeast Sides
