= Montecito View House =

Coordinates: 34.089749°N 118.203164°W

- Montecito View House on the cover of the Mutual Building pamphlet, published mid-1920s (date unknown)
- Built: 1909
- Architect: Lester S. Moore

Los Angeles Historic-Cultural Monument
- Designated: April 23, 1991
- Reference no.: 529

The Montecito View House, located at 4115 Berenice Place in Montecito Heights, Los Angeles, is a Craftsman bungalow designed by architect Lester S. Moore and built in 1909. It was one of the first homes constructed in Montecito Heights, and was featured on the cover of the Mutual Building Company's advertising pamphlet. Interesting aspects of the home include clinker brick and Arroyo stone chimney. The style is reminiscent of the work of Greene and Greene, Pasadena.

Advocated by Charles J. Fisher, the house was declared Los Angeles Historic-Cultural Monument #529 on April 23, 1991.

== See also ==
- Los Angeles Historic-Cultural Monuments on the East and Northeast Sides
- National Register of Historic Places listings in Los Angeles, California
