= Baltimore salt box =

Wooden Bin

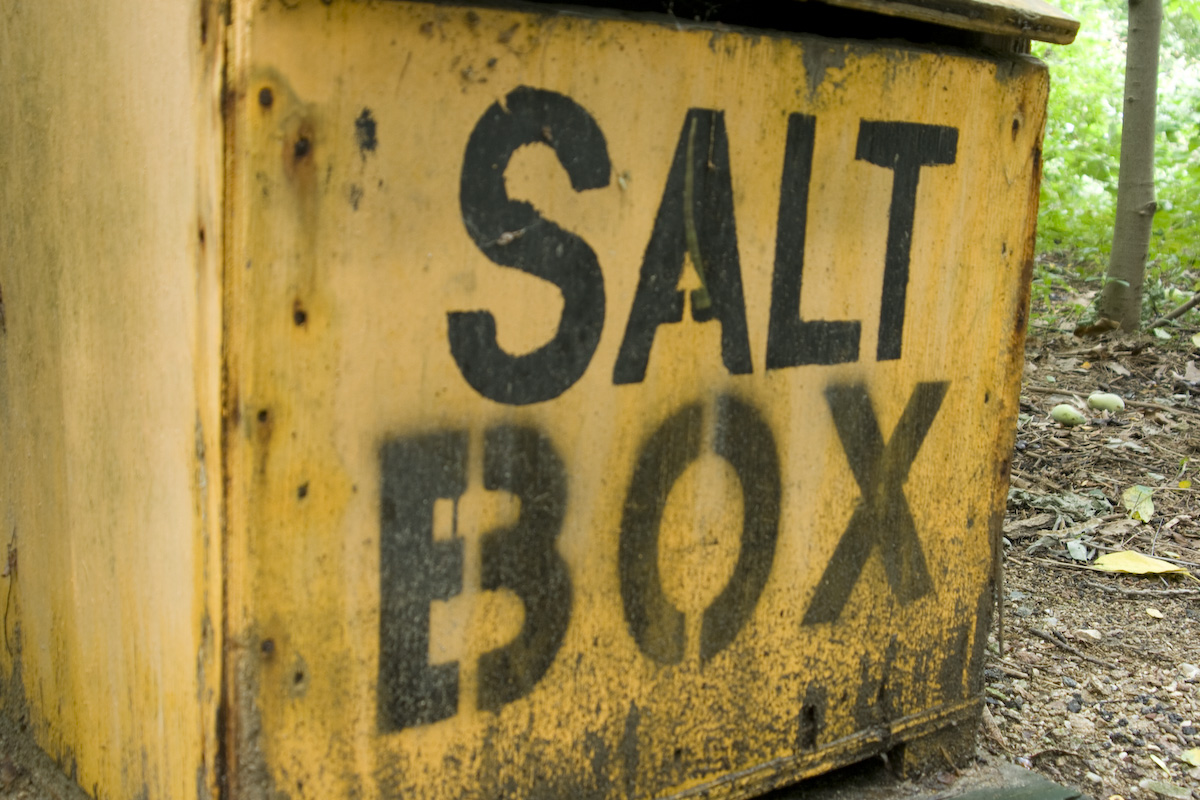

A Baltimore salt box is an example of a grit bin as used in Baltimore, Maryland. They are wooden boxes with hinged covers and are annually distributed around as a supplement to the city's snow removal and road salting operations. They are a service of Baltimore's Department of Transportation, which distributes the boxes around the city in the late fall (no precise date is given) in anticipation of winter weather. The boxes are filled with a mixture of road salt and sand for citizens to spread as needed to assist with traction and to prevent or melt icy patches on city streets.

The box is painted safety yellow for high visibility, and marked "salt box" on the front panel in characteristic stenciled black capital letters. They are typically are removed in the springtime, for refurbishment and redistribution the next season.

== History ==
Not much is known about when the publicly supported salt box became a regular practice in the city, although references to the placement of sand boxes by the Baltimore City Bureau of Highways appear in Snow and Ice Control Program reports as early as 1959. Neighboring counties with their own methods of distribution, variously described as barrels, bins and boxes, appear to have ended the practice in 2004, to the dismay of the county residents.

== Other uses ==
Besides the practical use, the humble salt box has its fans for many reasons, as demonstrated by an eponymous social media presence on Instagram established in 2018. In 2020, awareness of the salt boxes was greatly increased when a local artist noticed that salt boxes remained unseasonably present, due to the COVID-19 pandemic They decided to spruce up a local box by adding decorative elements, thus creating street art.

=== Civic engagement ===
The artist alerted the city's Department of Transportation, which responded favorably and "approved of the modification", encouraging further citizen artist engagement and coining the trend of salt box art. The artist posted guidelines for acceptable alterations to city property to their website, and the community produced many more in a spontaneous public art response. The salt box social media account launched a Google Map of Baltimore Salt Boxes, including categories for both unaltered salt boxes and art boxes, gathering contributions via crowdsourcing. With growing attention by local media, the salt box story quickly became a viral phenomenon over the winter of 2021 gaining nationwide and international notice. Aside from popular media, local politicians have taken note of the artist's project, with salutary remarks from the state's city senators, and one contributed by a councilman. In a nod to the plural use of the salt box for public safety, one box quotes Mayor Brandon Scott's own viral social media moment, reminding citizens to wear their face masks properly with the saying "Shorty, pull ya mask up".

=== Public Art ===
In accordance with the guideline expressed by the Department of Transportation, "as long as they have a salt theme or highlight something special in the surrounding neighborhood", salt box art themes include visual and word based puns on the theme of salt and spices, ice and snow, portraits, and tributes to local Baltimore culture. Well-known Baltimoreans with salt box homages include Billie Holiday, Cab Calloway, Divine, Tupac Shakur, Tori Amos, John Waters, as well as the Baltimore Black Sox, and Natty Boh among other cultural touchstones. Since permanence nor return of the original art is guaranteed, the main collaborators behind the art salt box phenomenon have put forward a plan with the Department of Transportation for citizens to choose to remove their art for safekeeping and reuse the following season, or to adopt a box for long term maintenance.

== Derivatives ==
Replicas of the salt box are available from the salt box artist in 3D printed plastic, and another artist's version is available in reclaimed wood, with an accompanying zine and customizable labels, and a piggy bank. For charitable fundraising purposes, a designed image of the salt box is available on printed clothing and stickers, in support of the Maryland based Moveable Feast (organization). A free coloring sheet was made for use by school-aged children, for submission in a contest for a winning design to be produced by the Department of Transportation as a special edition salt box in Fall 2021.
