= The Salt Box =

Coordinates: 34.0605°N 118.2455°W

- The Salt Box
- Interactive map of The Salt Box
- Governing body: private

Los Angeles Historic-Cultural Monument
- Designated: 1962
- Reference no.: 5

The Salt Box was a house built in the early 1880s in the Bunker Hill section of Los Angeles, California. Designed in the saltbox style that was popularized in New England, it was originally located at 339 South Bunker Hill Avenue (231 South Bunker Hill prior to a renumbering in the early 1890s). It was the home of physician Dr. A.G. Cook for most of the 1880s. In the late 19th century, Bunker Hill was one of the most prestigious neighborhoods in Los Angeles and was the site of many elegant Victorian homes. The Los Angeles Times wrote of old Bunker Hill: "Nowhere else in Los Angeles was the architecture so ornate. The mansions were wooden-frame Victorian with Gothic gingerbread touches applied with a heavy hand to simulate masonry." Though not as elegant as many of its Victorian neighbors, the Salt Box was "cherished by architecture students for the simplicity of its design."

In the 1950s, the Los Angeles Community Redevelopment Agency adopted a redevelopment plan for the Bunker Hill area. In the early 1960s, historic preservationists began efforts to preserve the Salt Box and another Bunker Hill mansion, known as the Castle. When the Los Angeles Cultural Heritage Board was formed in August 1962, the Salt Box was one of the first structures designated as a Historic Cultural Monument (HCM #5) on the Board's first day of business. The Castle received historic designation in May 1964, becoming Historic Cultural Monument #27. For several years after the Salt Box received historic designation, efforts continued to find a way to save the structure while still making room for redevelopment. By 1968, all of the Victorian homes of Bunker Hill Avenue had been demolished, except for the Salt Box and a second home, called the Castle. In August 1968, the Los Angeles Times urban affairs editor, Ray Herbert, wrote an article indicating that the two homes were to be demolished the following month to make room for a $500 million skyscraper development. Herbert noted that plans to relocate them to a planned Heritage Park had failed: "The end has come for Bunker Hill's two remaining turn-of-the-century mansions." Carl Mason, president of the Southern California Chapter of the American Institute of Architects said, "If it was just these two buildings, it wouldn't be so disturbing, but it's symptomatic of a lack of respect for our past -- of no one giving a damn about our heritage."

In September 1968, with demolition set for October 1, 1968, the Salt Box and the Castle were saved when the Los Angeles Recreation and Park Commission voted to move the two structures to city-owned land in Montecito Heights where the Heritage Square Museum was eventually built. Finally, in March 1969, the Salt Box and the Castle were moved to their new home in Montecito Heights to become center-pieces for the planned Heritage Square. Both structures were badly deteriorated after years of neglect, and a fundraising campaign was launched to raise money to restore the two homes. In October 1969, just seven months after the move, both structures were destroyed in a fire ignited by vandals. The Los Angeles Times reported that the two structures had been invaded by vandals and youths who used them for parties since they were relocated.

The house was photographed earlier in 1967 by Guy Webster and featured prominently on the cover of blues guitarist Taj Mahal's self-titled debut album, released in early 1968. At the time the house was still in its original location, surrounded by a barbed wire fence.

== See also ==
- List of Los Angeles Historic-Cultural Monuments in Downtown Los Angeles
- Heritage Square Museum
