= Mount Washington, Los Angeles =

Mount Washington
- Neighborhoods of Los Angeles
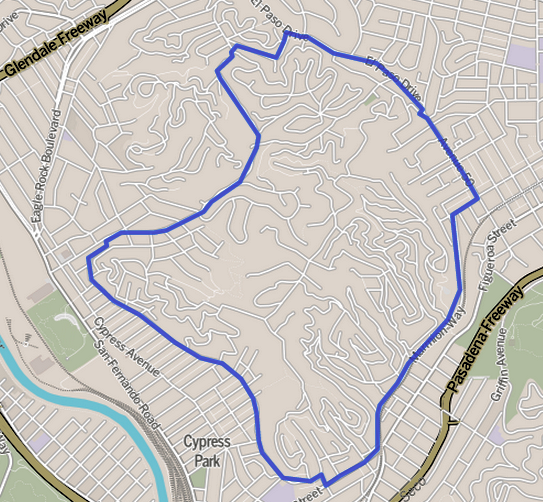
- Mount Washington neighborhood, as delineated by the Los Angeles Times

- Location within Central Los Angeles
- Coordinates: 34°06′02″N 118°12′58″W
- Country: United States
- State: California
- County: County of Los Angeles
- City: City of Los Angeles

Government
  - City Council: Eunisses Hernandez
  - State Assembly: Wendy Carrillo (D)
  - State Senate: Maria Elena Durazo (D)
  - U.S. House: Jimmy Gomez (D)

Area
  - Total: 1.9 sq mi (4.9 km^{2})

Population (2000)
  - Total: 12,728
  - Density: 6,878/sq mi (2,656/km^{2})
- ZIP Code: 90065, 90042
- Area code: 213/323

Mount Washington is a historic neighborhood in the Repetto Hills of Northeast Los Angeles, California. Founded in 1909, it includes the Southwest Museum, the world headquarters of the Self-Realization Fellowship, and Eldred Street, one of the three steepest streets in the United States.

== History ==
In the 19th century the area was part of Rancho San Rafael.

Mount Washington was founded in 1909 as a subdivision laid out by real estate developer Robert Marsh. Marsh built the Mount Washington Hotel at the summit of Mount Washington, and the Los Angeles and Mount Washington Railway Company was soon established as a funicular railway up the hill as an alternative to constructing roads up the area's steep hillsides. The railway operated until January 1919. The "beauty and the quirky nature of Mount Washington" has inspired songs.

== Population ==
The 2000 U.S. census counted 12,728 residents in the 1.85-square-mile Mount Washington neighborhood—or 6,878 people per square mile, an average population density for the city. In 2008, the city estimated that the resident population had increased to 13,531.

In 2008 the median age for residents was 33, about average for the city and the county. The percentage of never-married men (40.9%) was among the county's highest.

According to the Mapping L.A. project of the Los Angeles Times, based on the 2000 census, the neighborhood was "moderately diverse" ethnically, with a high percentage of Latino residents. The breakdown was Latinos, 61.2%; whites, 20.8%; Asians, 12.8%; blacks, 2.6%; and others, 2.7%. Mexico (44.4%) and El Salvador (9.6%) were the most common places of birth for the 41.5% of the residents who were born abroad—an average figure for Los Angeles.

Over the last decade, the demographics have been shifting. As of 2009, Mount Washington has no racial or ethnic group in a majority. According to the American Community Survey (2009), Mount Washington is 33% White, 3% Black, 47% Latino, 9% Asian, and 7% other (census tract 1851). The only census tract entirely within Mount Washington's boundaries is census tract 1851 (census tracts 1852 and 1862 are also in Mount Washington but also include surrounding neighborhoods). Census tract 1851 is on the east side of Mount Washington, and includes Moon Canyon Park and the Carlin G. Smith Recreation area; and it is extremely racially and ethnically diverse, even for Los Angeles.

The 2000 census found that the median yearly household income in 2008 dollars was $57,725, about average for the city. The average household size of 2.9 people was about the same as Los Angeles as a whole. Renters occupied 45.1% of the housing stock and house- or apartment-owners held 54.9%.

According to the New York Times in 2010, Mount Washington (tract 1851) has a median household income of about $60,000; and 30% of its residents have a household income greater than $100,000 per year; neighboring census tracts shared with Mount Washington and other neighborhoods also have somewhat similar income data.

== Geography ==
According to the Mapping L.A. project, Mount Washington is bordered on the north by Eagle Rock, on the east by Highland Park, on the south, southwest and west by Cypress Park and on the northwest by Glassell Park.

Mount Washington is split between Los Angeles City Council districts 1 and 14 and is part of California's 34th congressional district. The neighborhood lies mostly within ZIP code 90065, with an eastern portion in 90042, and the area code is 323.

== Education ==
Twenty-five percent of Mount Washington residents aged 25 and older had earned a four-year degree by 2000, an average figure for both the city and the county. One school lies within the neighborhood — Mount Washington Elementary School, LAUSD, at 3981 San Rafael Avenue. Mount Washington students "consistently score among the top schools in Los Angeles on the Academic Performance Index."

== Notable places ==
- Southwest Museum
- Lummis House
- World Headquarters of the Self-Realization Fellowship
- Eldred Street, between Avenue 50 and Cross Avenue on the northeast side of Mount Washington, with a slope of 33% grade, is one of the three steepest streets in Los Angeles and one of the steeper streets in the world (Baldwin Street, Dunedin, New Zealand is 35% and Bradford Street in San Francisco is 41%). Bottom of the steep climb is 34.10853°N 118.2081°W

== Notable residents ==
- Mahershala Ali, actor
- Nancy Cartwright, actor and voice actor of Bart Simpson of the multi Emmy Award winning television show "The Simpsons"
- James Simpson Conwell, City Council member, businessman and inventor
- Marilyn Ferguson, bestselling New Age author and publisher
- Jake Longstreth, artist and co-host of internet radio show Time Crisis with Ezra Koenig
- Inger Lorre, singer and musician (Nymphs)
- Matthew Murphy, singer and musician (The Wombats)
- Jack Smith, columnist
- Jesse Thorn, public radio host and founder of the Maximum Fun podcast network
- Antonio Villaraigosa, mayor of Los Angeles and speaker of the State Assembly
- Paramahansa Yogananda, yogi and guru who founded the Self-Realization Fellowship

== See also ==
- Los Angeles Historic-Cultural Monuments on the East and Northeast Sides
