= Alsace, California =

Unincorporated community in California, United States

Coordinates: 33°58′43″N 118°24′56″W

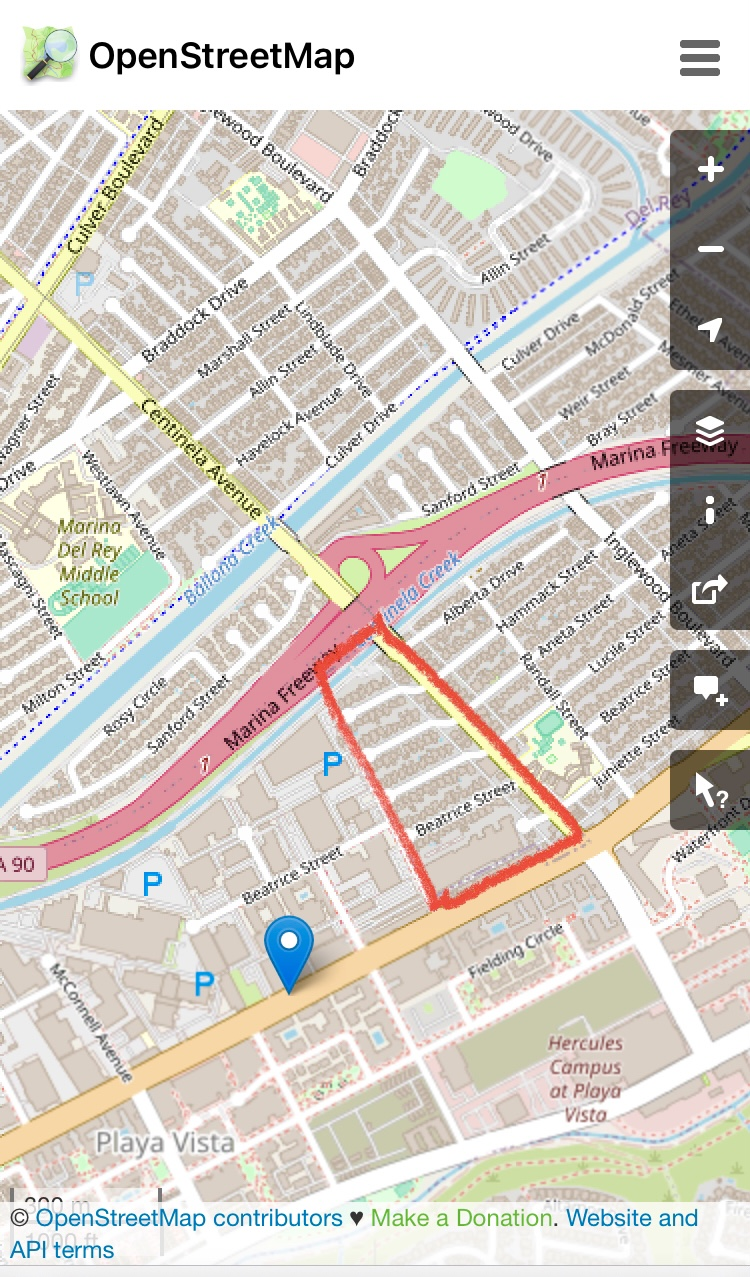
Approximate boundaries of unincorporated Alsace

Alsace is a place name designating what was originally an interurban trolley stop, and is now an approximately five-block enclave of unincorporated Los Angeles County in the Westside region, surrounded by Del Rey, just north of the Playa Vista neighborhood of Los Angeles, California, United States.

== Geography ==
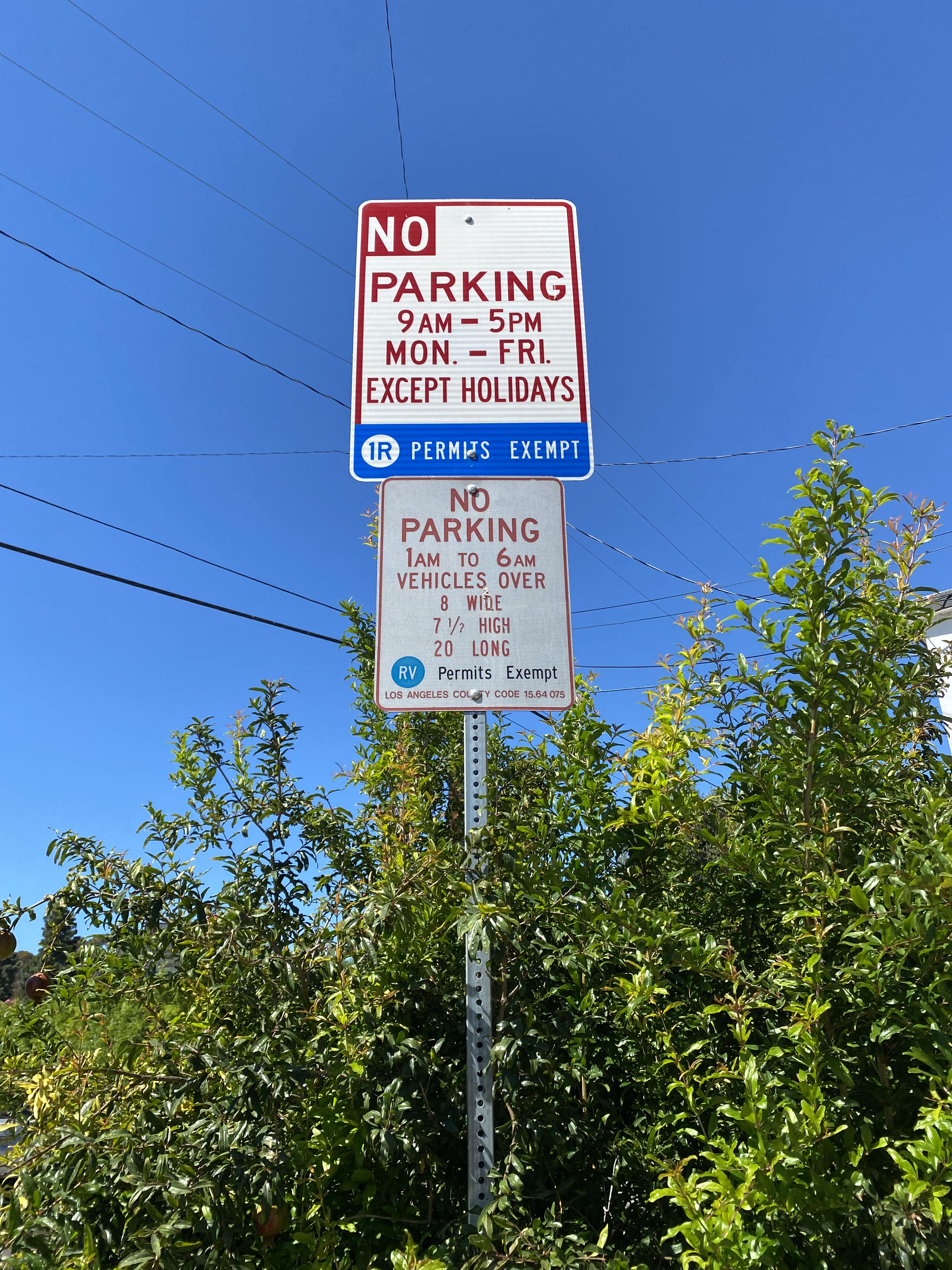
Parking restriction signs with Los Angeles County markings signify that Alsace is distinct from the surrounding City of Los Angeles neighborhoods

The Alsace area is one of approximately 472 recognized neighborhoods in Los Angeles County.

Although historically Alsace was a large, amorphously defined section of Los Angeles lying between Ballona Creek and what is now Jefferson Boulevard, today Alsace consists of a five-block strip of unincorporated Los Angeles County land bounded Jefferson Boulevard, Centinela Avenue, Grosvenor Boulevard, and Centinela Creek Channel (or Marina Freeway, California State Route 90, which runs parallel to the creek channel in this section).

The streets of Alsace include one-block sections of Hammack Street, Aneta Street, Lucile Street, Beatrice Street, as well as a very short span of Juniette Street, all of which dead-end before Grosvenor.

Alsace has one east-west paved alley (parallel to Jefferson) and one north-south paved alley (parallel to Centinela). As is common in certain unincorporated sections of Los Angeles County, the streets in the Alsace do not have sidewalks as the County has limited funds available for sidewalk construction and maintenance.

== Government ==
The Alsace county island is served by Los Angeles County first responders, including the Los Angeles County Sheriff Department located in nearby Marina del Rey.

The Los Angeles County Department of Public Works and the Los Angeles County Department of Regional Planning refer to this area as West Fox Hills. (Fox Hills is a nearby neighborhood in the city of Culver City.)

== History ==
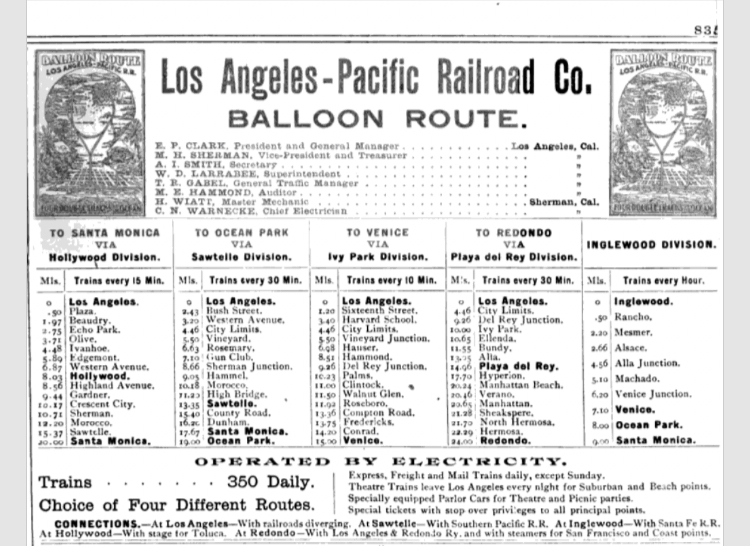
Alsace station is listed in the far right column

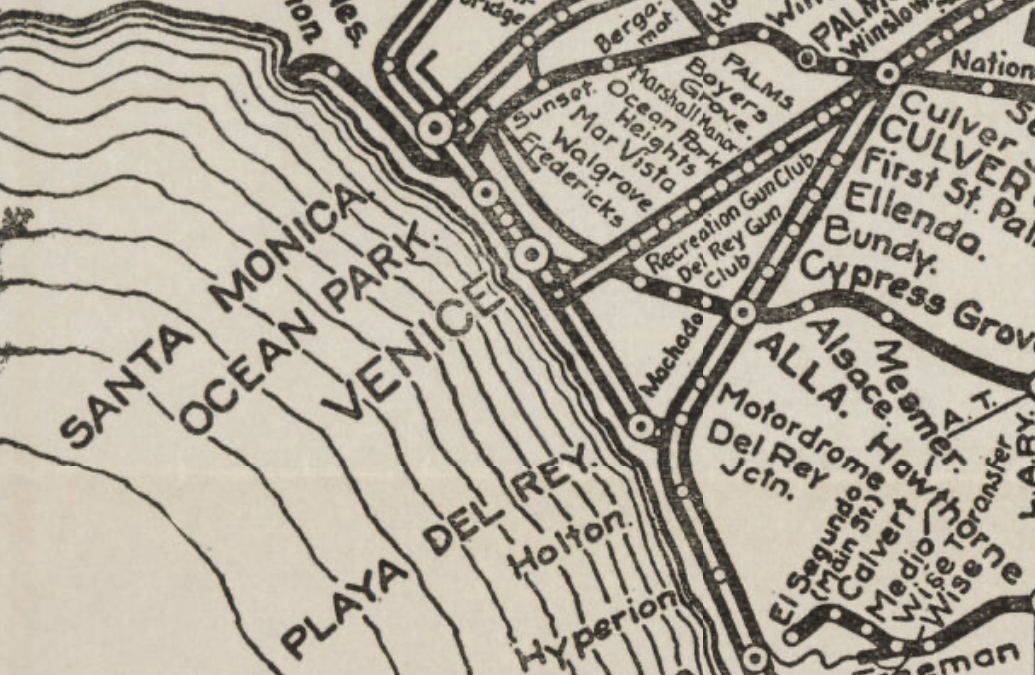
Location of Alsace station in 1913

Alsace was a stop on the Venice–Inglewood Line of the Los Angeles’ electric interurban system, located at what is now the intersection of Centinela Avenue and Jefferson Boulevard. Local historian the Militant Angeleno connects the place name with the ancestral homeland of local ranchero and real estate developer Louis Mesmer.

Oil was discovered in the area in 1929 and drilling was conducted on the otherwise undeveloped Alsace section for a period of less than a decade thereafter. After that, Alsace and adjacent areas remained primarily agricultural through the 1950s.

Pictures of the Hughes Airport as late as 1952 confirm that that area remained undeveloped as of that date. Shortly thereafter, it was developed as Tract No. 10038 and construction commenced on free-standing single-family residences completed in 1953 and 1954. By 1960, the housing development portion of the Alsace was completed and was shown on the maps as currently configured.

== See also ==
- County island
- Cypress Grove, California
- Alla, California
- Motordrome, California
- Machado, California
