= Mark Scholz =

German-American oncologist and author (born 1955)

- Born: 1955 (age 70–71)
- Education: Occidental College (1976); Creighton University (1983) MD; University of Southern California (1984)
- Occupations: Oncologist, author
- Years active: 1984–present
- Website: markscholz.com

Mark Scholz (born 1955) is a German-American, double board-certified oncologist and author. He serves as medical director of Prostate Oncology Specialists Inc. in Marina del Rey, CA, a medical practice exclusively focused on prostate cancer. He is also the executive director of the Prostate Cancer Research Institute. He received his medical degree from Creighton University in Omaha, NE. Dr. Scholz completed his Internal Medicine internship and Medical Oncology fellowship at University of Southern California Medical Center.

== Career ==
Scholz received his medical degree from Creighton University in Omaha, Nebraska and completed his internal medicine internship and medical oncology fellowship at University of Southern California Medical Center. He served as oncology director at the memorial campus of the Centinela Freeman Regional Medical Center from 1996 to 2001. His hospital affiliations include St. John's Health Center, Marina del Rey Hospital, Los Angeles County Hospital and Motion Picture Hospital. He continues as a primary investigator actively supervising a number of ongoing prostate cancer clinical trials and has authored or coauthored over 90 scholarly articles and abstracts in his area of expertise.

He is a past president and co-founder of the Prostate Cancer Research Institute, a non-profit organization dedicated to patient education and research.

== Author ==
Dr. Scholz is co-author of the book Invasion of the Prostate Snatchers and The Key to Prostate Cancer: 30 Experts Explain 15 Stages of Prostate Cancer. Dr. Scholz has written and produced educational material on the subject of prostate cancer in various media including DVDs, blogs, newsletters and pamphlets. He is frequently an invited guest speaker in the community at prostate cancer conferences and prostate cancer support groups throughout the world. He is also an educational speaker on behalf of Amgen, Dendreon and Sanofi-Aventis.
