= Motordrome, California =

Archaic place name in Los Angeles County

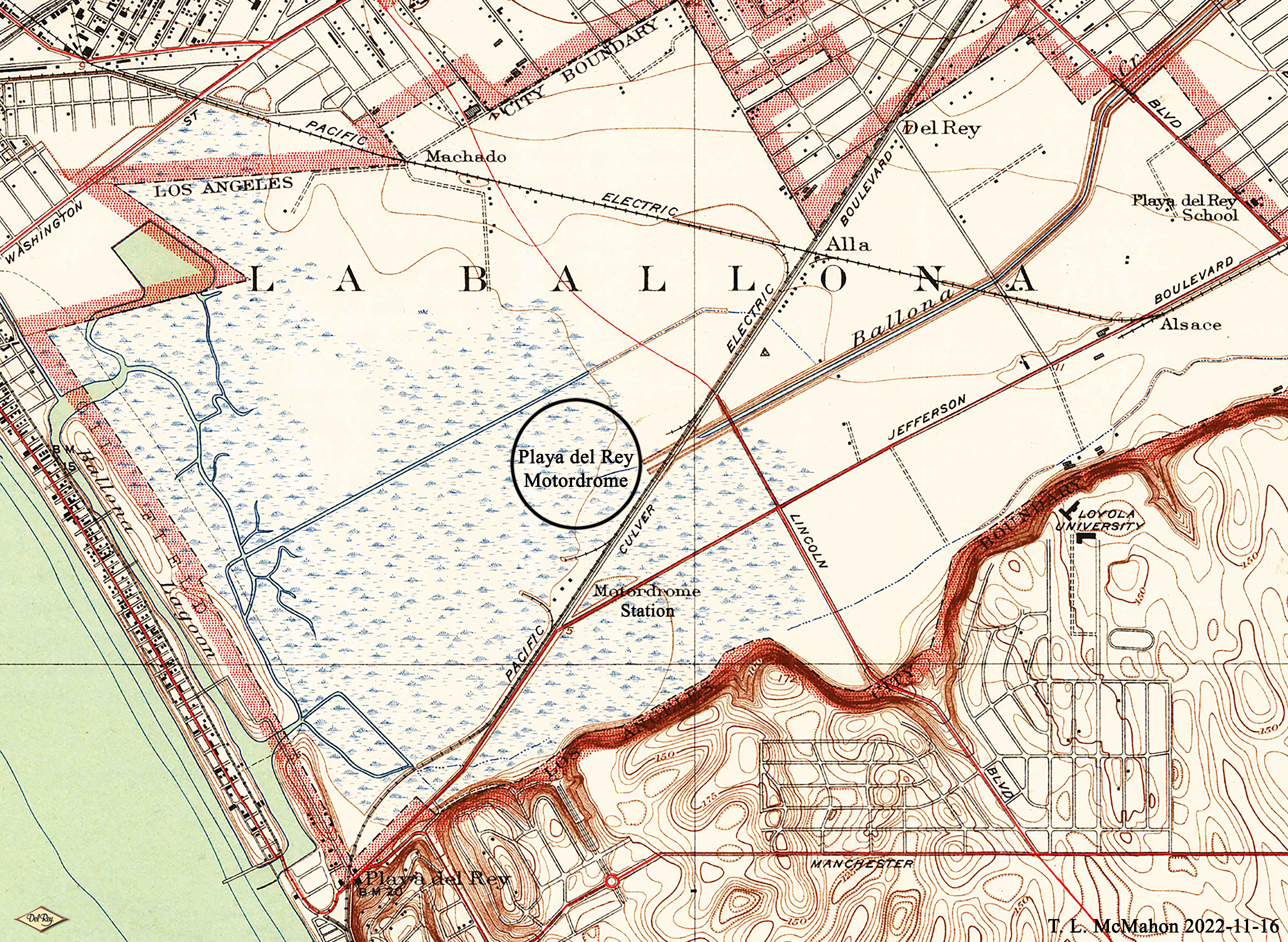
Playa del Rey Motordrome location on USGS Map CA Venice 1934

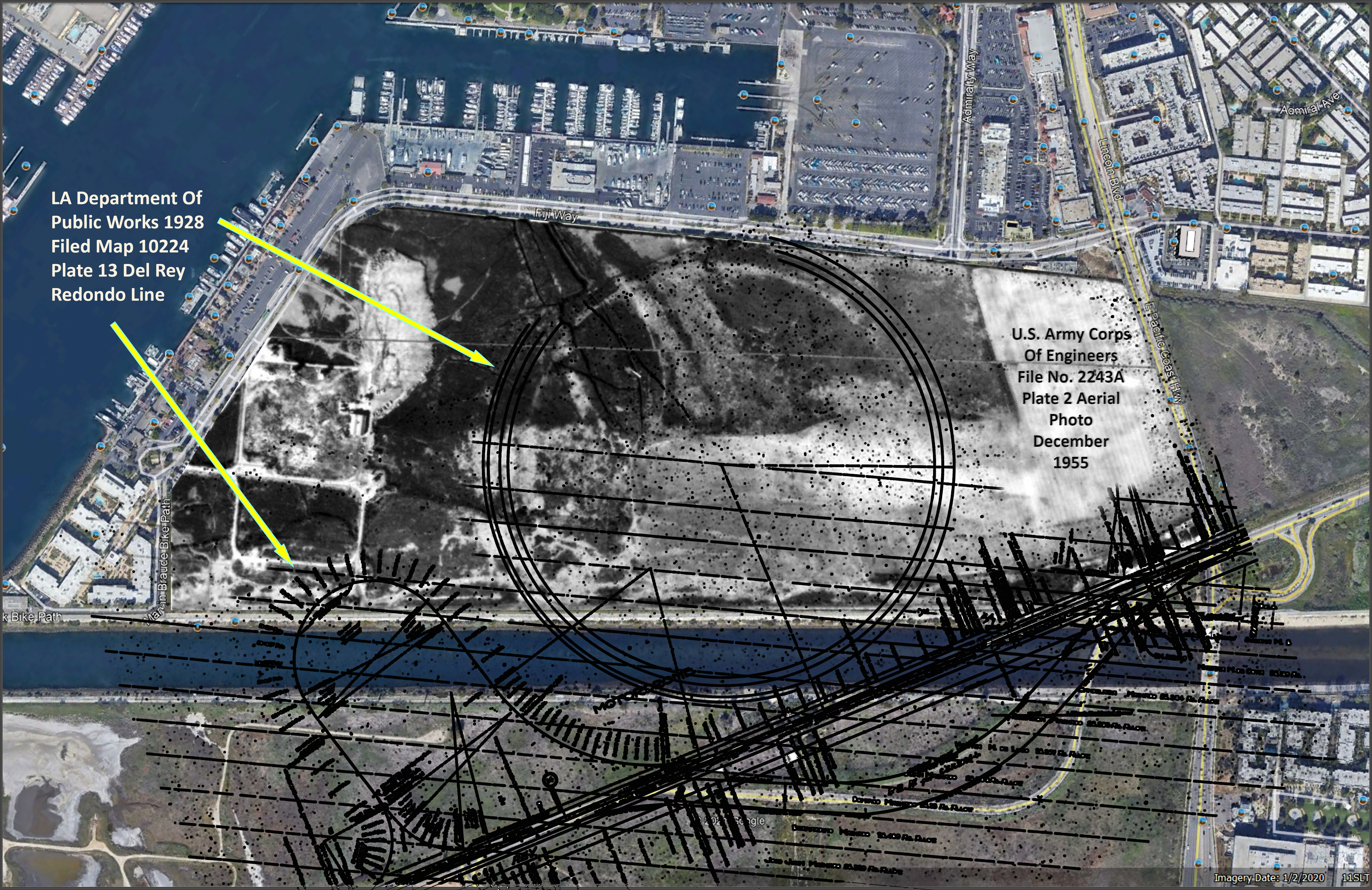
Motordrome precise location based on Army Corps of Engineers aerial photo from 1950s

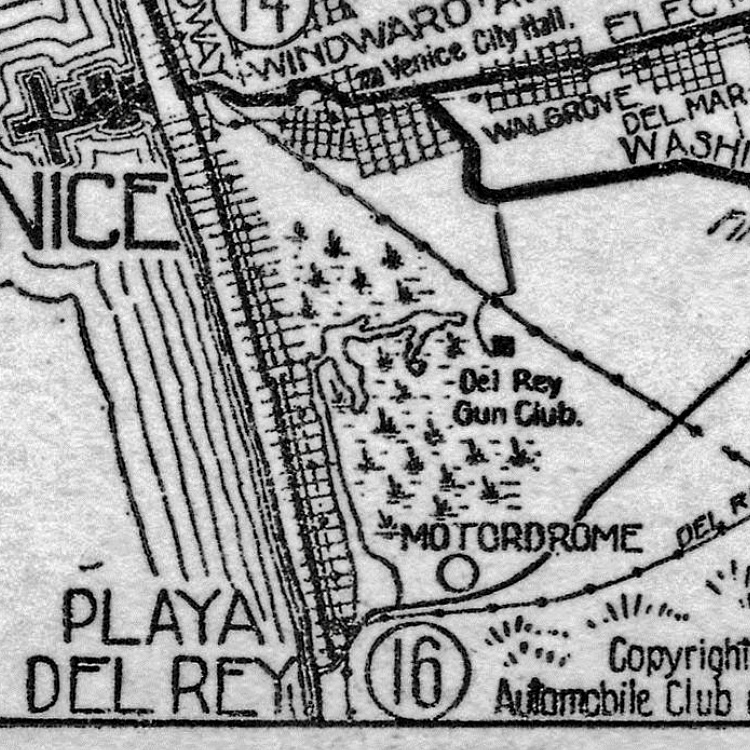
Motordrome on an Auto Club map, 1914

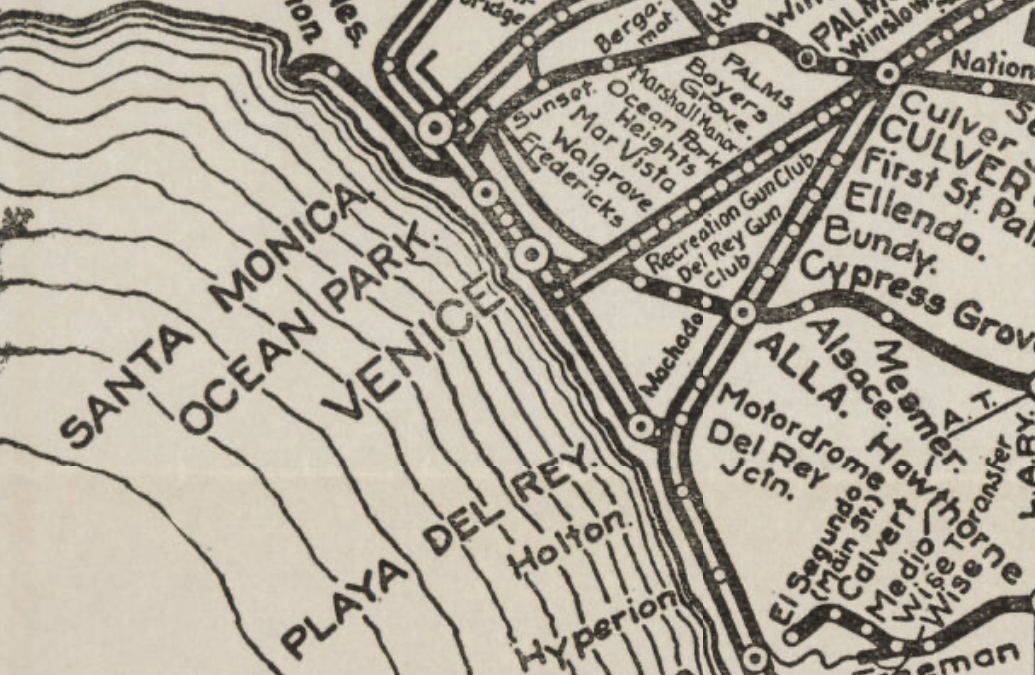
Motordrome on 1913 Pacific Electric route map

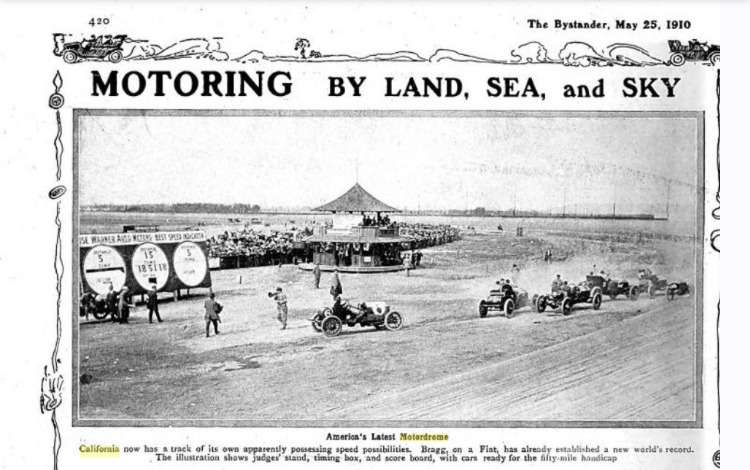
Opening races of Los Angeles Motordrome pictured in Bystander magazine (1910)

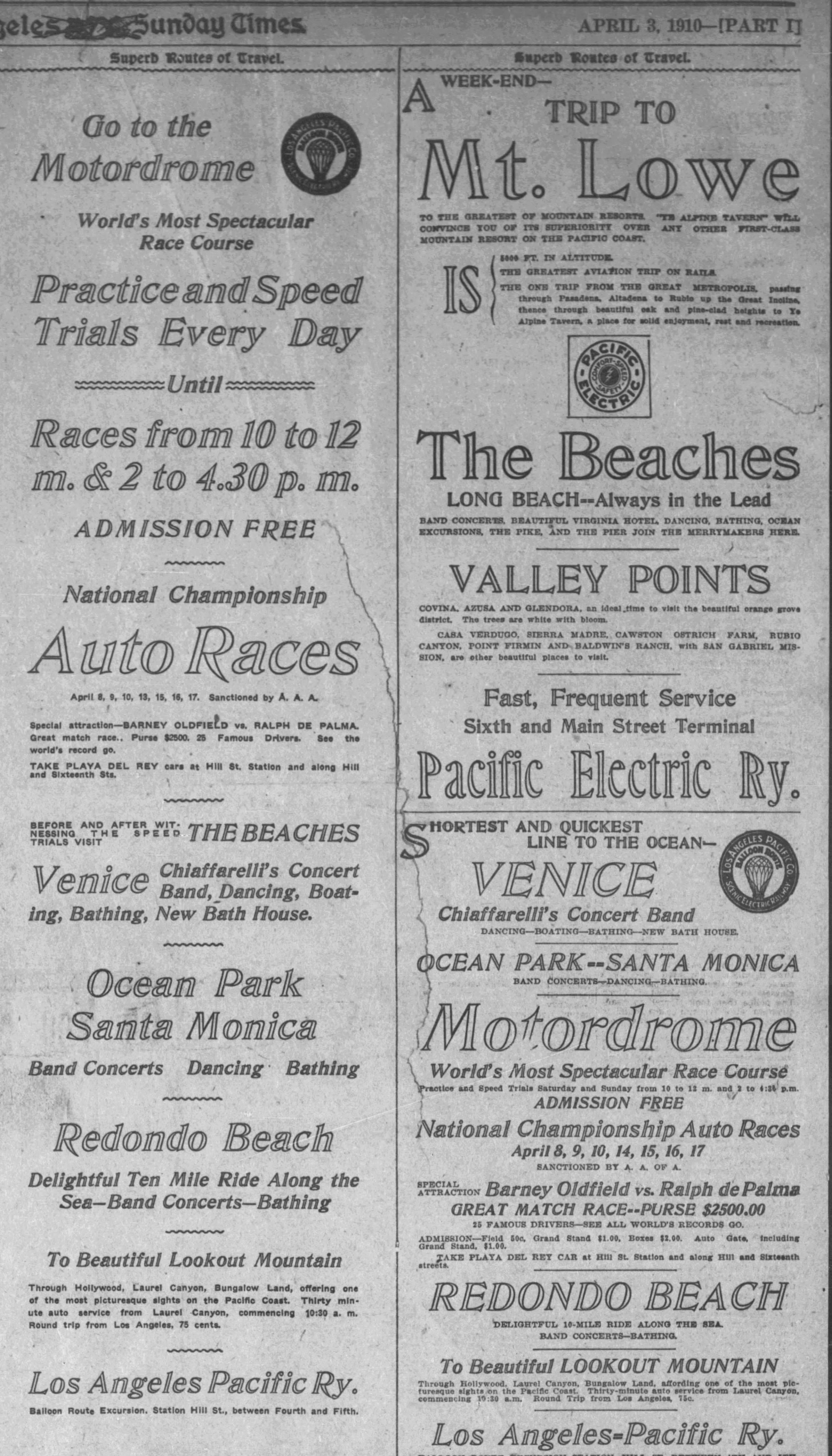
"Go to the Motordrome: Practice and Speed Trials Every Day" The Los Angeles Times, April 3, 1910

Motordrome is an archaic placename in Los Angeles County, California. It designates a rail spur that existed in the 1910s on the Redondo Beach via Del Rey Line, named for the Los Angeles Motordrome race track and airfield. Motordrome station lay at an elevation of 7 feet (2 m). The coordinates for Motordrome preserved in the GNIS (33°58′07″N 118°26′21″W) place it near the present-day intersections of Jefferson Boulevard and Culver Boulevard, in what is now the Ballona Wetlands Ecological Reserve.

Even though the racetrack was destroyed in a fire in 1913, and the rails were removed by 1918, the place name persisted on USGS survey maps until at least the 1930s.

The Barnes Circus train partially derailed at Motordrome in 1914, injuring four.

== See also ==
- Alla, California
- Alsace, California
- Cypress Grove, California
- Machado, California
