= Centinela Freeman Regional Medical Center, Memorial Campus =

Coordinates: 33°58′3″N 118°20′41″W

- Centinela Freeman HealthSystem

Geography
- Location: Inglewood, California, United States

Organization
- Care system: Private
- Type: Community
- Affiliated university: None

Services
- Beds: 358

History
- Former name: Daniel Freeman Memorial Hospital
- Founded: 1954
- Closed: 2007

Links
- Lists: Hospitals in California

Centinela Freeman Regional Medical Center, Memorial Campus was a hospital that was located at 333 N. Prairie Ave, Inglewood, California, USA. The hospital was operated by Centinela Freeman HealthSystem, and was one of the three campuses of the Centinela Freeman Regional Medical Center.

== History ==
The hospital was founded by the Sisters of St. Joseph of Carondelet in 1954 as Daniel Freeman Memorial Hospital, named after Daniel Freeman, founder of the city of Inglewood. Carondelet later purchased a hospital in Marina del Rey and named it Daniel Freeman Marina Hospital. The two Daniel Freeman hospitals were acquired in 2001 by Tenet Healthcare. The name was changed in 2004, when the hospital was transferred to the Centinela Freeman HealthSystem.

Daniel Freeman Memorial Hospital transferred most medical services away from the facility in 2006, and was closed in 2007, after consolidating its services with Centinela Hospital Medical Center. Centinela Hospital Medical Center continues to operate after being purchased by Prime Healthcare Services in 2007. The Centinela Freeman HealthSystem's remaining hospital, Daniel Freeman Marina Hospital continued operations as Marina Del Rey Hospital, an independent for-profit facility for several years before being purchased by Cedars-Sinai Medical Center in 2015.

Bonanza actor Dan Blocker died of a pulmonary embolism there after being discharged from the hospital following routine gall bladder surgery. One of the most famous victims from the 1992 Los Angeles riots that was treated here was truck driver Reginald Denny after he was pulled from his truck and nearly beaten to death and was brought here by several people who rescued him from the intersection of Florence Avenue and Normandie Avenue in South Central Los Angeles.

== See also ==
- Centinela Freeman Regional Medical Center, Centinela Campus
- Centinela Freeman Regional Medical Center, Marina Campus
- Frank D. Parent, headed fund drive to establish hospital, 1952
