= Cypress Grove =

Cypress Grove may refer to:

- Cypress Grove (musician)
- Cypress Grove, California
- Cypress Grove Chevre, cheese company
- Cypress Grove Plantation, a Southern plantation owned by President Zachary Taylor near Rodney, Mississippi.
- Cypress Grove (EP), extended play by Glaive
