= Centinela Freeman HealthSystem =

Centinela Freeman HealthSystem previously operated three hospitals in the West Los Angeles area of California in the United States, collectively known as the Centinela Freeman Regional Medical Center:

- Centinela Campus in Inglewood; formerly known as Centinela Hospital was purchased by Prime Healthcare Services in 2007 and is now operating as Centinela Hospital Medical Center.
- Memorial Campus in Inglewood; formerly known as Daniel Freeman Memorial Hospital had its services consolidated with Centinela Hospital Medical Center and was closed in 2007.
- Marina Campus in Marina del Rey; formerly known as Daniel Freeman Marina Hospital is now operating as Marina Del Rey Hospital, and has been a part of Cedars-Sinai Medical Center's system of healthcare services since 2015.

== History ==
In 2004, Tenet Healthcare transferred the three hospitals to Centinela Freeman HealthSystem, a newly formed regional health care network owned by local physicians, community leaders, investors, and hospital executives.
