= Machado, California =

Archaic place name

Coordinates: 33°59′04″N 118°26′49″W

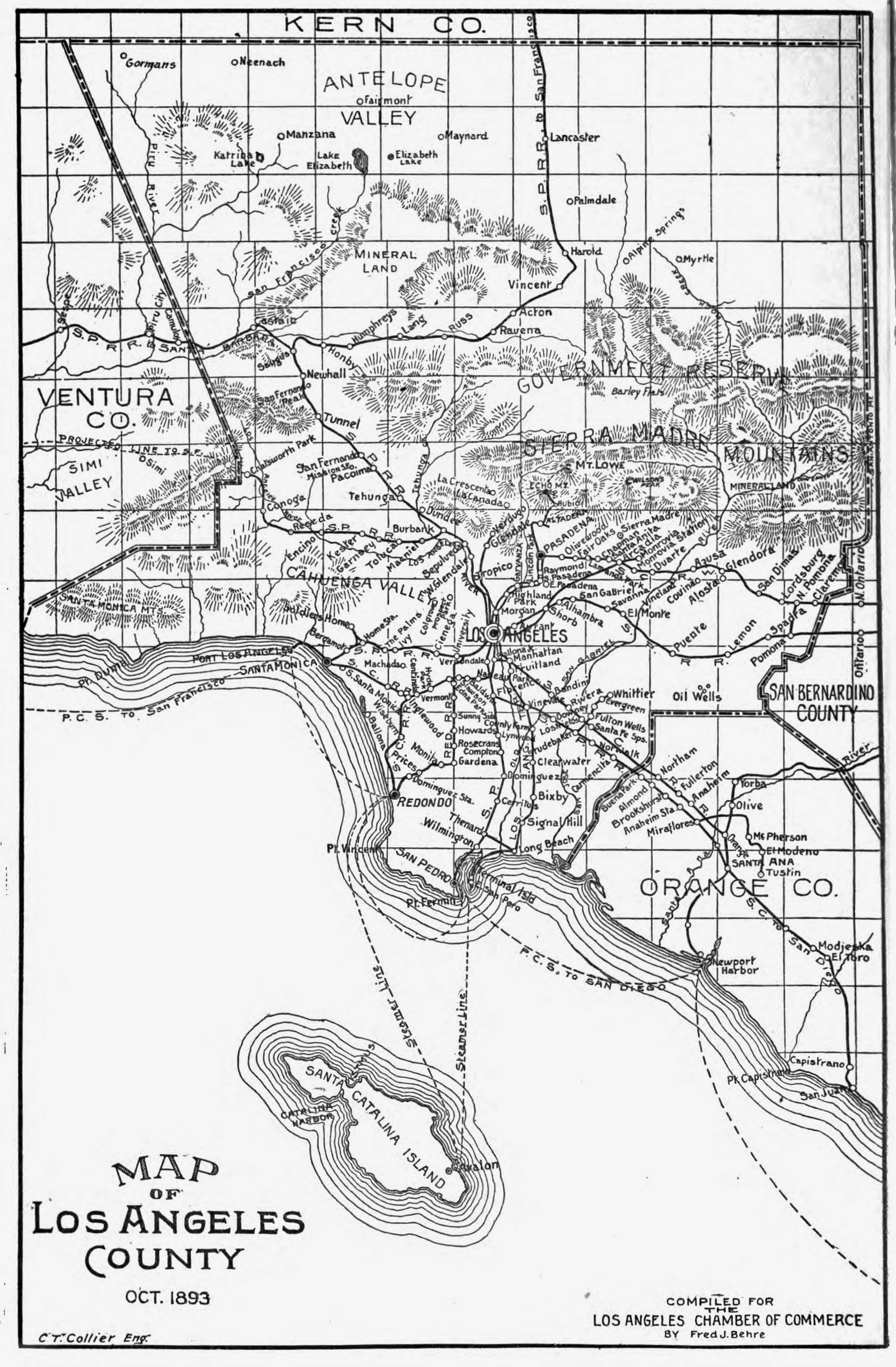
"Machada" on a map of Los Angeles County published October 1893 for the World's Columbian Exposition

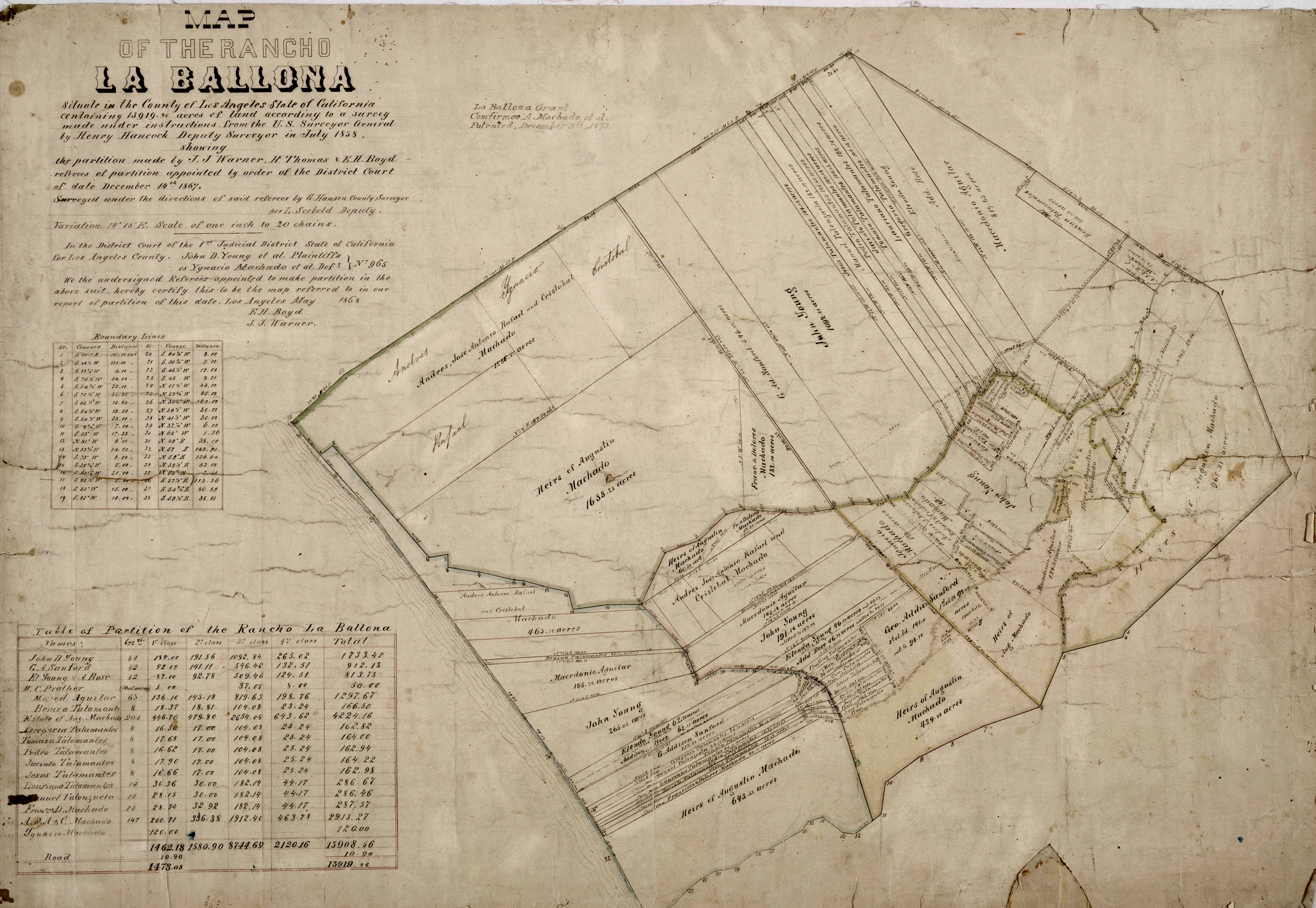
The future site of the Machado rail stop was owned by the heirs of Agustín Machado circa 1868

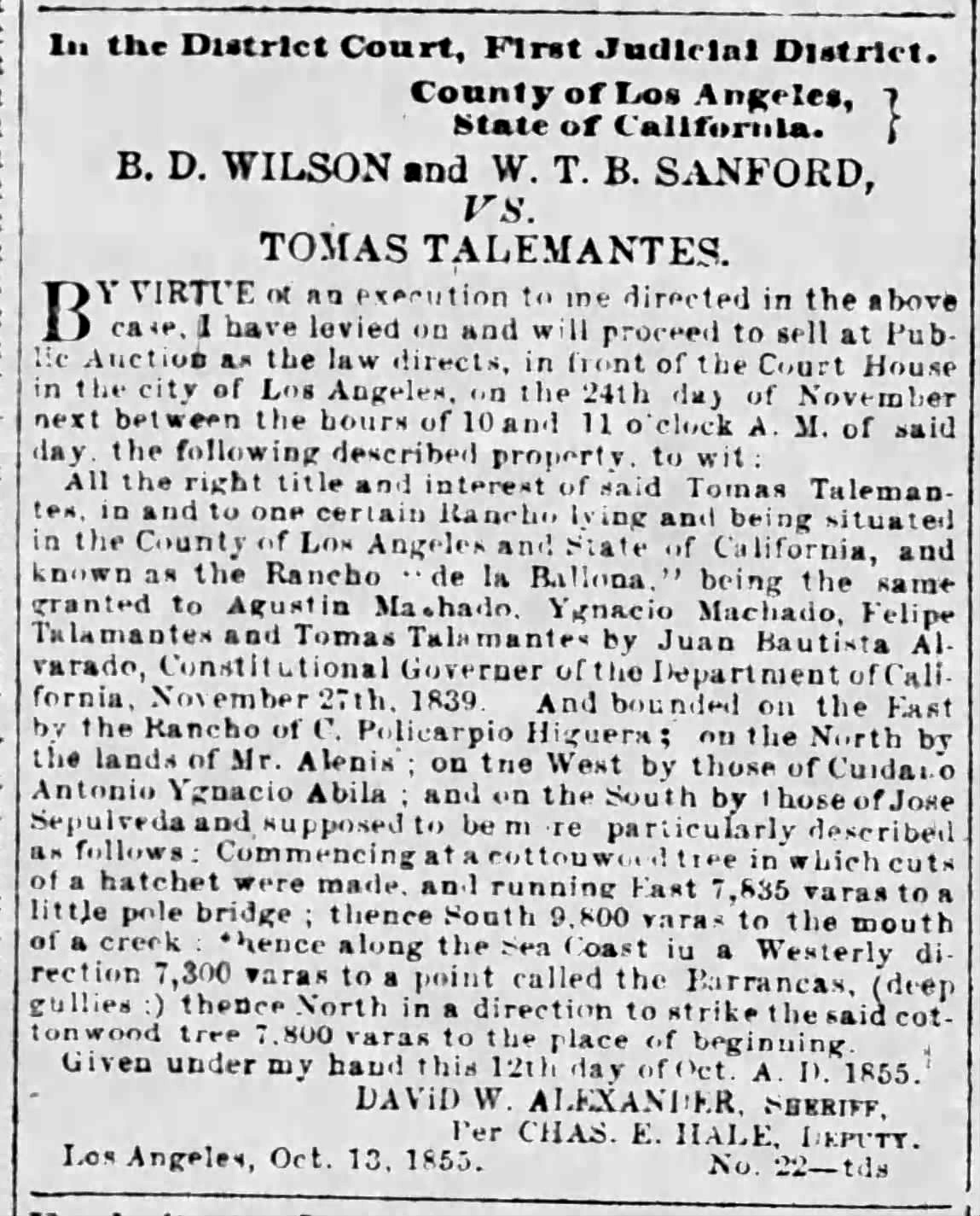
Los Angeles Star, Los Angeles, California, November 3, 1855

Machado refers to three locations in Los Angeles, California, all named for the rancho-era Machado family. Machado is a name derived from Portuguese, meaning "hatchet", The family may have used a hatchet to mark their lands: An 1855 real estate description mentions a "cottonwood tree marked with cuts of a hatchet."

(1) Machado is a former rail stop in Los Angeles County, California. It laid at an elevation of 13 feet (4 m). Machado was a stop on the Venice–Inglewood Line just north of Alla Junction; the line, which dated to the late 19th century, was lightly used for both passengers and freight. Machado still appeared on USGS maps as of 1934.

(2) Machado post office was organized circa 1878 when an application was made to the Post Office Department. The new Machado post office station was located northwest quarter section 12 township 2W range 15 west, half a mile north of Ballona Creek and one mile west of La Ballona station.

(3) Machado Lake was a 19th century name for Bixby Slough, now Harbor Regional Park lake.

== See also ==
- Alla, California
- Motordrome, California
- Alsace, California
- Cypress Grove, California
