= Los Angeles Motordrome =

Racetrack and airfield (1910-1913)

Coordinates: 33.968°N 118.439°W

- Los Angeles Motordrome as depicted on a vintage postcard; Ballona watershed visible in background.
- Location: Motordrome, near Playa del Rey, California, United States
- Opened: 1910
- Closed: 1913

Circular
- Surface: Wood
- Length: 0.99 mi (1.6 km)
- Turns: 1

The Los Angeles Motordrome was a circular 1-mile (1.6 km) wood board race track. It was located in Playa del Rey, California, and opened in 1910. In addition to automobile racing, it was used for motorcycle competition and aviation activities.

The Motordrome was a scaled-up version of a bicycling velodrome, and was built by Jack Prince, a pre-eminent constructor of velodromes at the time. It was the first of numerous board tracks built for auto racing in the 1910s and 1920s. As an early example of a race track purpose-built for competition, it marked the first use of then-innovative safety features that later became common to most tracks. The Motordrome was highly successful, attracting many competitors and large crowds of paying spectators, but it lasted just three years. A fire destroyed the track in January 1913.

== Background ==
Velodrome and board track builder Jack Prince. Photo is from 1916.

The Motordrome was the brainchild of Hungarian-born mechanical engineer Frederick Moskovics, who at the time was an employee of Remy Electric, and who later became an early member of the Society of Automotive Engineers and eventually, president of the Stutz Motor Company. Moskovics had previously worked for Maybach and Daimler-Motoren-Gesellschaft, and through these connections had become involved in racing as the manager of Daimler's racing team in 1904.

Years before, as a student, Moskovics had pursued an interest in bicycle racing, and had made the acquaintance of champion bicycle racer Jack Prince. Prince, an Englishman, had emigrated to the United States after the end of his racing career and developed a thriving business building velodromes. By 1909, Prince had built the Los Angeles Coliseum Motordrome, a velodrome-like motorcycle racing facility that was just over 1/4 mile (0.40 km) in circumference.

Around the time that Moskovics' career brought him to Los Angeles, in 1909, Carl Fisher was developing the Indianapolis Motor Speedway, and automobile racing was gaining momentum as a business. To bring racing to Los Angeles, Moskovics partnered with his old friend Prince; a group of local businessmen including oil man and racing enthusiast Frank A. Garbutt; and the Pacific Electric Railway Company, which supplied spectators by building a line to the new track. Public announcements were made and contracts were let in January 1910, and race dates for officially-sanctioned contests were obtained from the Automobile Association of America's Contest Board.

== Construction ==
The Motordrome incorporated many features that were new ideas at the time, and eventually became common to many race tracks.

Construction began on January 31, 1910 and was scheduled for just 25 days to complete the racing surface and another 30 to build the grandstands and the rest of the facilities. The cost was $75,000 (about $1.7 million in 2012 dollars), and an additional $10,000 was invested in arc lighting equipment for night racing. Pine was used for the track surface, as that species was thought to be the most resistant to sun exposure, and the track was treated with a coating made from crushed sea shells to improve traction. Two shiploads of lumber were used, comprising 300 linear miles of 2×4 boards. The track was 75 feet (23 m) wide, including a 30-foot (9.1 m) apron of crushed rock, and banked at a 1:3 ratio, making the outer rim 25 feet (7.6 m) off the ground.

Around the inner circumference, there was a 125-foot (38 m) buffer between the racing surface and the spectator fence, including a 10-foot (3.0 m) sand trap. At Garbutt's suggestion, a sturdy guard rail was erected around the outer rim. Another guard rail was erected around the inner edge of the track, at a height calculated by Moskovics to coincide with the wheel hubs of racing cars, and a second rail was erected just above the first to arrest the tendency of cars to overturn.

While the racing facilities were being built, Pacific Electric Railway constructed a special 3/4-mile (1.2 km) track spur to deliver spectators via Red Car trolley. The Motordrome stop of Redondo Beach via Playa del Rey Line persisted on USGS survey maps into the 1930s.

Due to the raised outer rim of the circular raceway, viewing was completely closed off from outside the grounds. Seating was provided for 40,000 spectators, including a covered grandstand built to hold 12,000. Access to the infield and pits was provided by three cement-lined tunnels.

== Racing history ==
A head-to-head grudge match between Barney Oldfield and Ralph DePalma was an opening day attraction.

While Prince was overseeing construction, Moskovics traveled east to promote the venture and secure commitments from notable competitors. The opening event at the Motordrome was a nine-day series of races and exhibitions that ran from April 8, 1910 to April 17. Notable racers Barney Oldfield, Ralph DePalma, Lewis Strang, Ray Harroun, Joe Nikrent, and Caleb Bragg were all in attendance.

The Motordrome's promoters had promised that world records would fall at the new race track, and efforts were made to deliver as quickly as possible. Prince had predicted 35-second lap times prior to construction, and laps of just over 36 seconds were produced in a preliminary contest between Oldfield and DePalma, prior to opening day, breaking a one-mile record of 37.7 seconds previously set by Strang. By the time the inaugural race meet concluded, additional records were set for 5-mile (8.0 km) (DePalma, 3:15.62) and 10-mile (16 km) (George Robertson, 6:31) runs.

Because only a limited number of AAA-sanctioned auto racing events were available, motorcycle races were also held to keep the Motordrome fully utilized. The first major motorcycling event was held on May 8, 1910, with notable early motorcycle racer Jake DeRosier establishing new records for 25-mile (40 km), 50-mile (80 km), 100-mile (160 km) and one-hour runs.

In 1911, the Motordrome hosted its first 24-hour endurance race, won by Valentine Hust and Frank Verbeck in a Fiat, completing 1,491 miles (2,400 km) at an average speed of 62 1/8 miles per hour (100.0 km/h). In May of that same year, "Texas Cyclone" Eddie Hasha set a new 1-mile (1.6 km) motorcycle record at the Motordrome, reaching 95 miles per hour (153 km/h). That record fell in December 1912 to Lee Humiston, who broke 100 miles per hour (160 km/h) while riding an Excelsior, a speed never reached or bested by any of the automobiles.

== Aviation ==
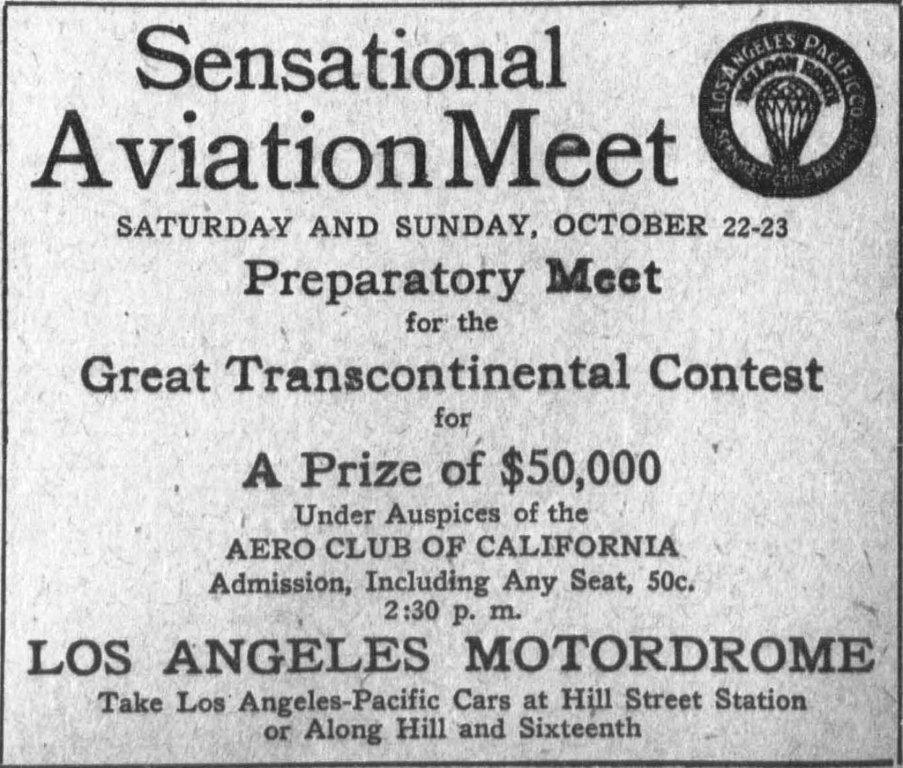
Aviation exhibitions were also a spectator attraction.

Plans to include aviation uses were made early-on, with Moskovics inviting the Aero Club of America and aircraft manufacturers, including the Wright Brothers and Glenn Curtiss, to make use of the Motordrome's facility for experimentation and exhibition. The Aero Club constructed a hangar large enough for 16 machines at the track, and on some occasions automobiles were used to tow un-powered aircraft. Later in 1910, Curtiss moved to California from New York and set up a shop and a flight school at the Motordrome, and used the facility for sea plane experiments for a time before moving that work to San Diego.

== Demise and legacy ==
On August 11, 1913, a fire blamed on vagrants burned part of the Motordrome's race track. Though the facility was not fully destroyed, the owners elected not to rebuild it, in part because the trolley line had out-lived its useful life. Nevertheless, the track had made its mark and there was widespread interest in building others like it. By 1929, at least 24 board tracks had been constructed around the country.

== See also ==
- Beverly Hills Speedway
- Brooklands
