= Cypress Grove, California =

Archaic place name

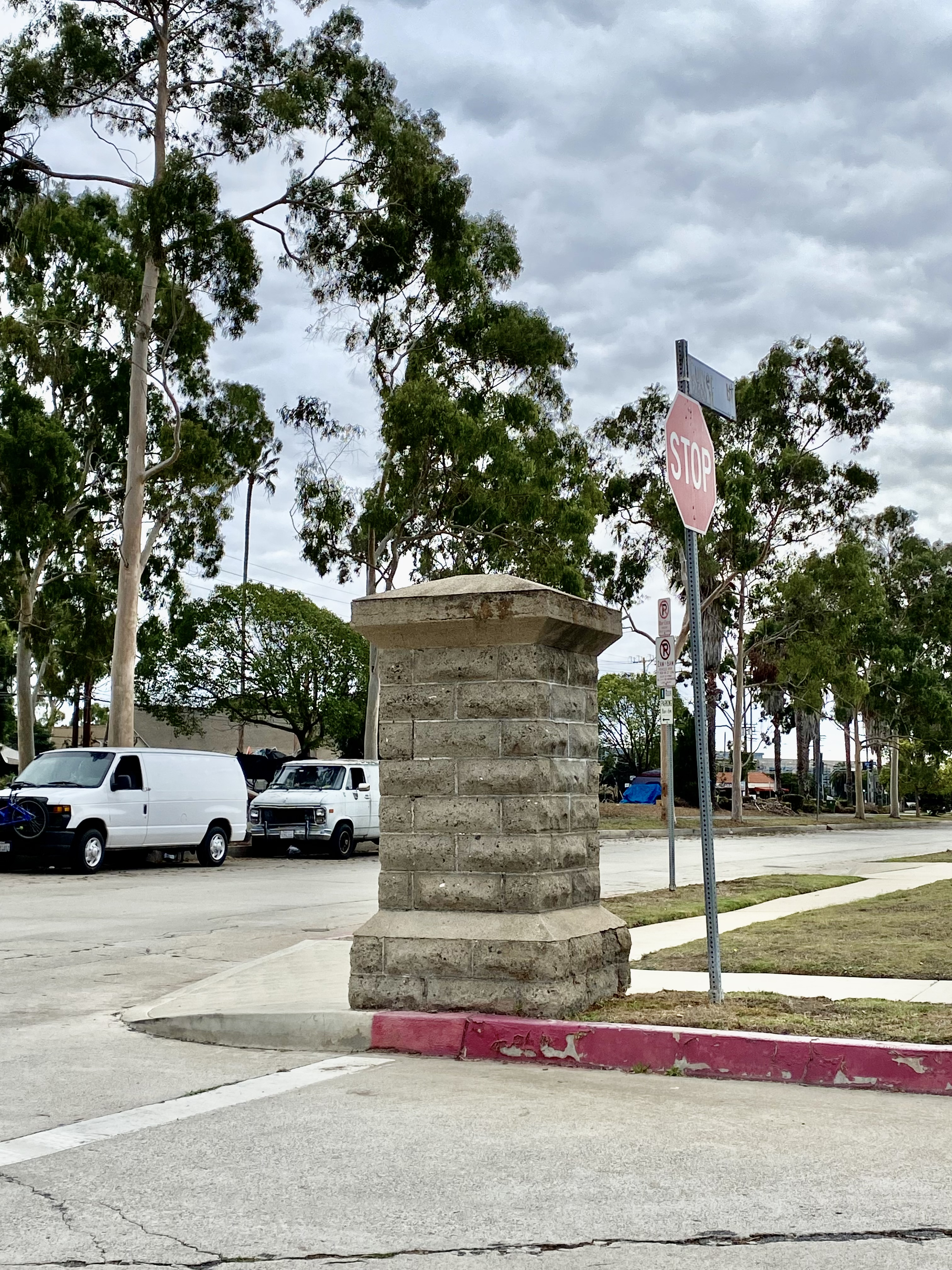
Little Culver and Mascagni Street, surviving gate post from the never-built Venice Del Rey; Culver Boulevard Bike Path, a rail trail built on the old Playa Del Rey streetcar right-of-way, is visible in the background.

Cypress Grove, California was a stop on the Redondo Beach via Playa Del Rey Line of the Los Angeles streetcar system.

The Cypress Grove stop was located just east of Alla Junction in what is now the Del Rey neighborhood of Los Angeles in Los Angeles County, California. Based on the coordinates (33.9911229°N 118.4211888°W) in the Geographic Names Information System, the stop was at what is now the intersection of Centinela Avenue and Culver Boulevard.

The planned Venice Del Rey development near the Cypress Grove stop of the Playa Del Rey Line was platted in 1905, and several streets were constructed and named after composers (Beethoven, Verdi, Wagner, Mascagni, et al.), but the residences were never built.

Cypress Grove
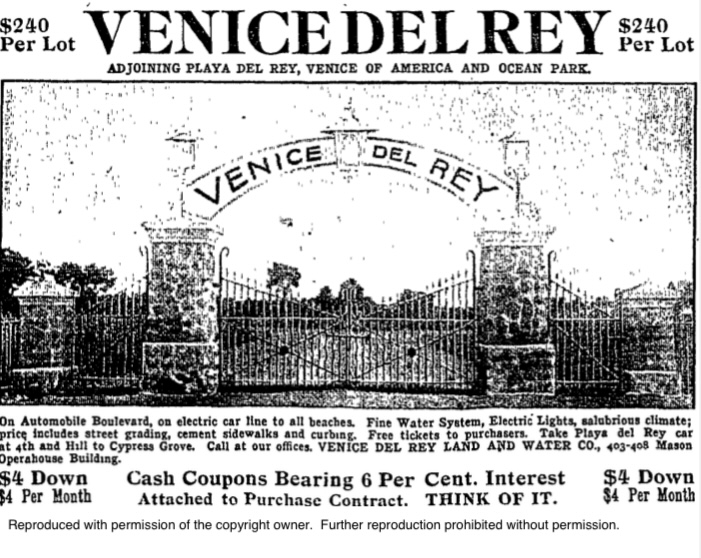
Venice Del Rey Land and Water Company advertisement, 1905, inviting buyers to inspect lots near the Cypress Grove stop of the Playa Del Rey Line

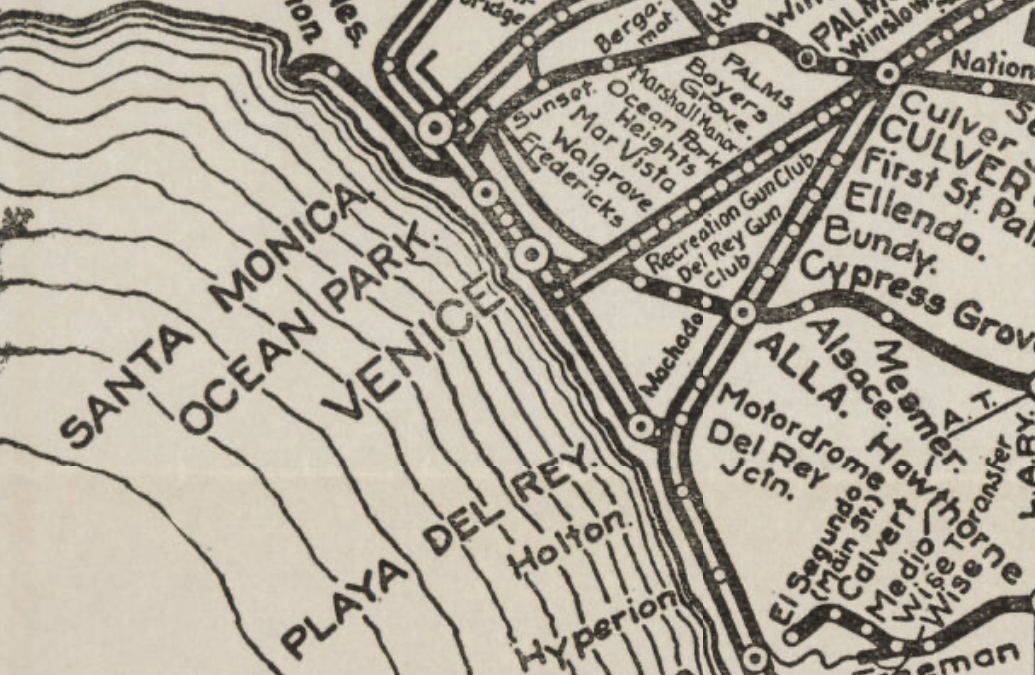
Cypress Grove visible on 1912 map of PE system

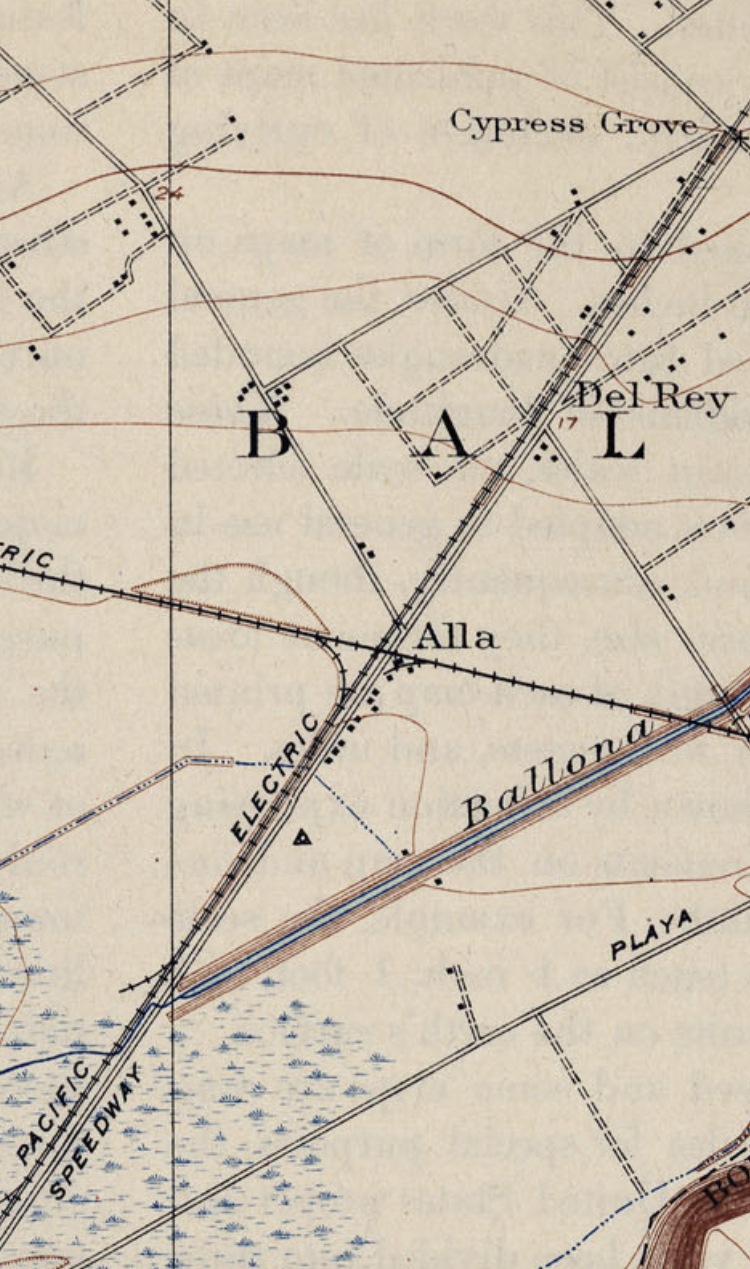
Cypress Grove on 1923 USGS map of Venice quadrangle; Speedway was an early name for what is now Culver Boulevard

== See also ==
- Alla, California
- Alsace, California
- Motordrome, California
- Machado, California
