= Alla, California =

Former rail junction, archaic place name

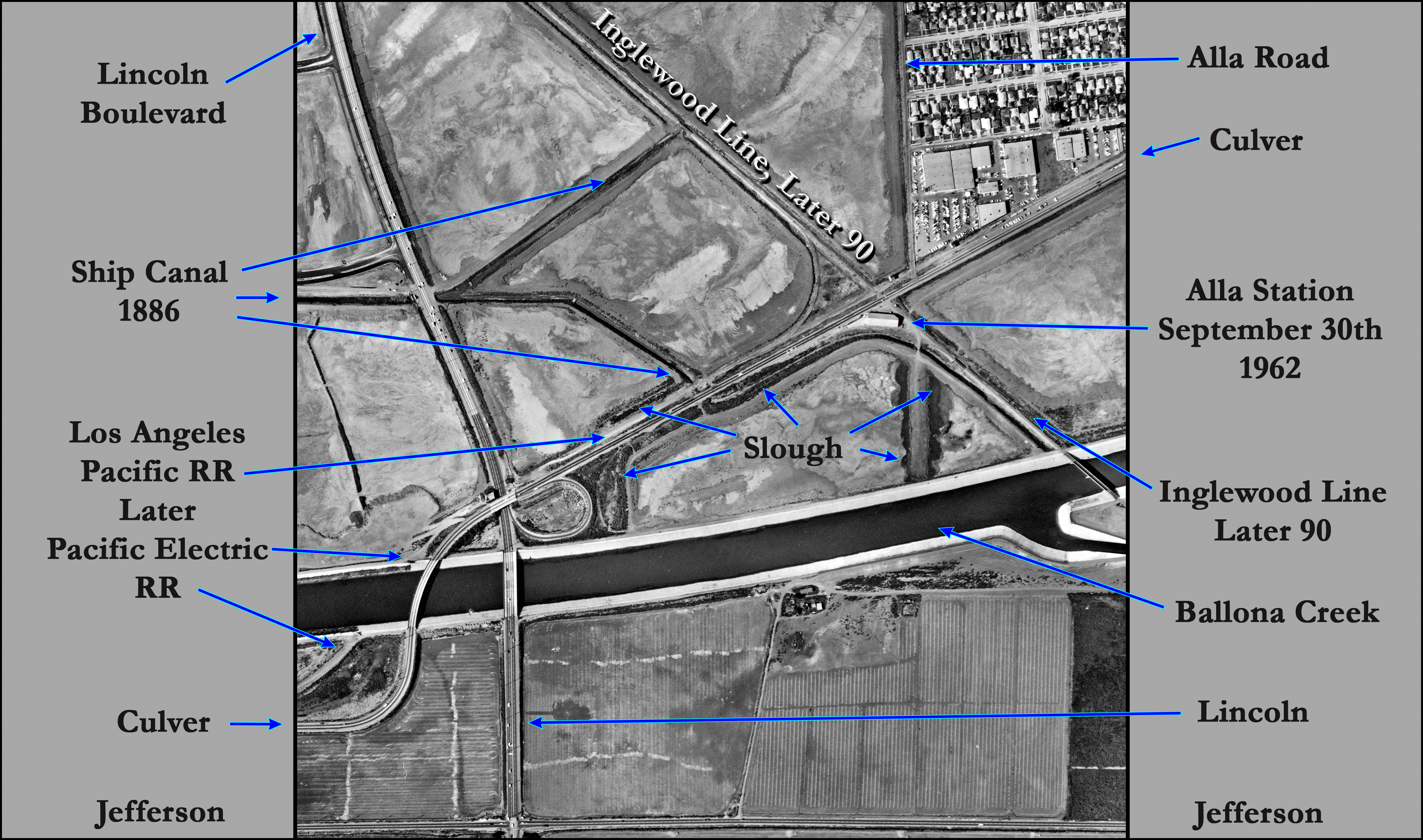
Alla Station and environs, 1962

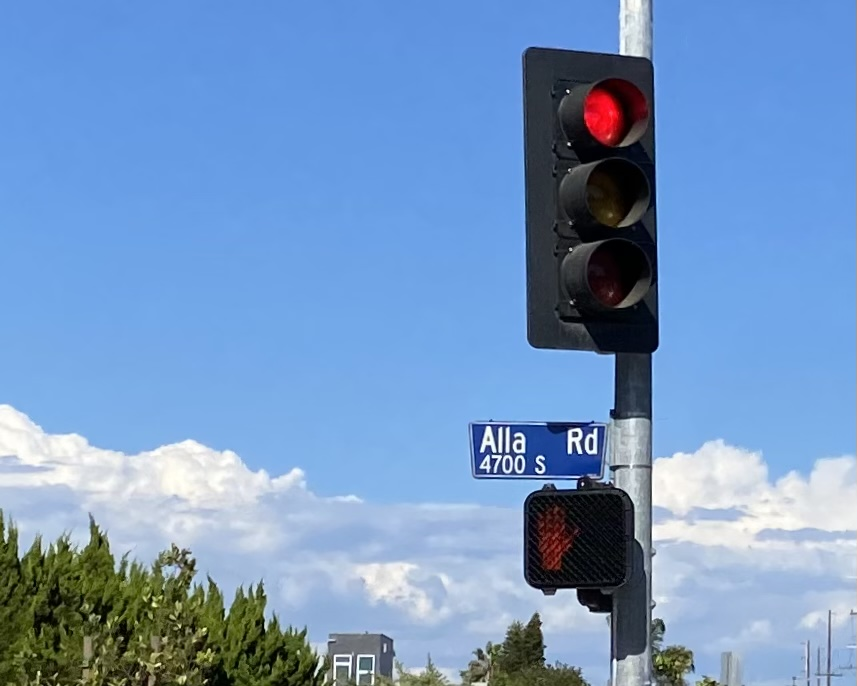
Alla Road was probably laid out between 1902 and 1905

Alla is a former streetcar station and archaic place name located near Marina del Rey in the Westside region of Los Angeles County, California.

The former Glen Alla Park (now Bill Rosendahl Del Rey Park) is also derivative of this place name; the park sits near the intersection of Glencoe Avenue and Alla Road.

Alla lies at an elevation of 16 feet (5 m).

== History ==
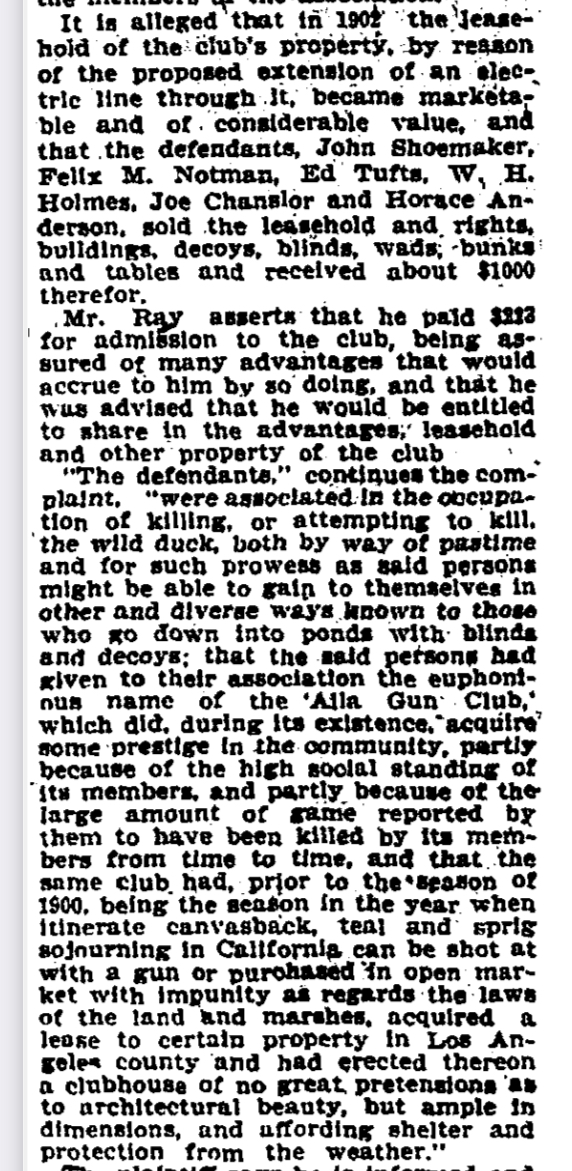
Alla Gun Club members hunted canvasback and teal ducks

Alla is named after hunting lodge, Alla Gun Club, that existed around 1900 and organized duck hunts at what is now Ballona Wetland Ecological Reserve. The Alla station was named after the club's old hunting grounds.

In 1902, Alla Station was described as being “two miles distant” from the new Playa Del Rey development; the coordinates of the station recorded in the GNIS (33°58′52″N 118°25′47″W) place it on the north side of Culver Boulevard near what is now the Marina Freeway.

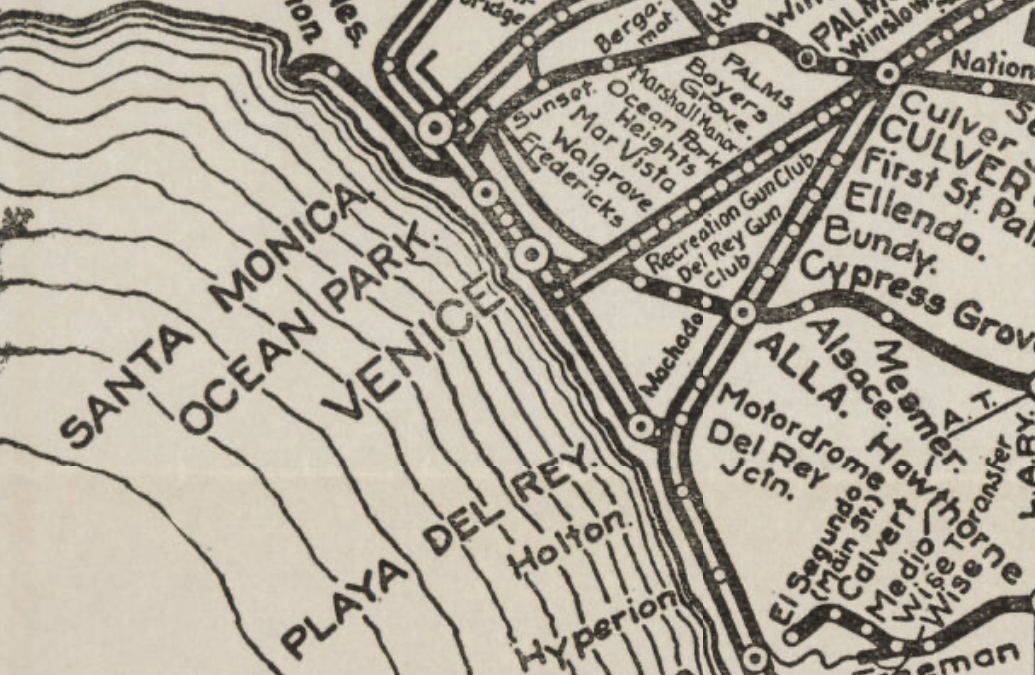
Alla pictured on 1912 Pacific Electric route map

Alla Station was the site of a wye where the Inglewood Line and Redondo via Del Rey Lines of the Los Angeles electric streetcar system crossed and was sometimes called Alla Junction.

Circa 1929, The Pacific Electric Magazine reported an improvement would be made at “Culver Blvd. at Alla Station on the Inglewood Line [to] reconstruct and pave tracks across the street…at an estimated cost of $680.00. The work is necessary to conform with improvement of Culver Boulevard by the County of Los Angeles.

In 1937, the same magazine reported “The U.S. Government, in connection with the Los Angeles County Flood Control District, is deepening, widening and improving Ballona Creek flood control channel which crosses our Del Rey Redondo line near Alla Station…Re-alignment of the railway, which requires a shorter crossing of the channel by a single-track bridge, has been worked out and is now under construction at an estimated gross cost of more than $42,000.00.”

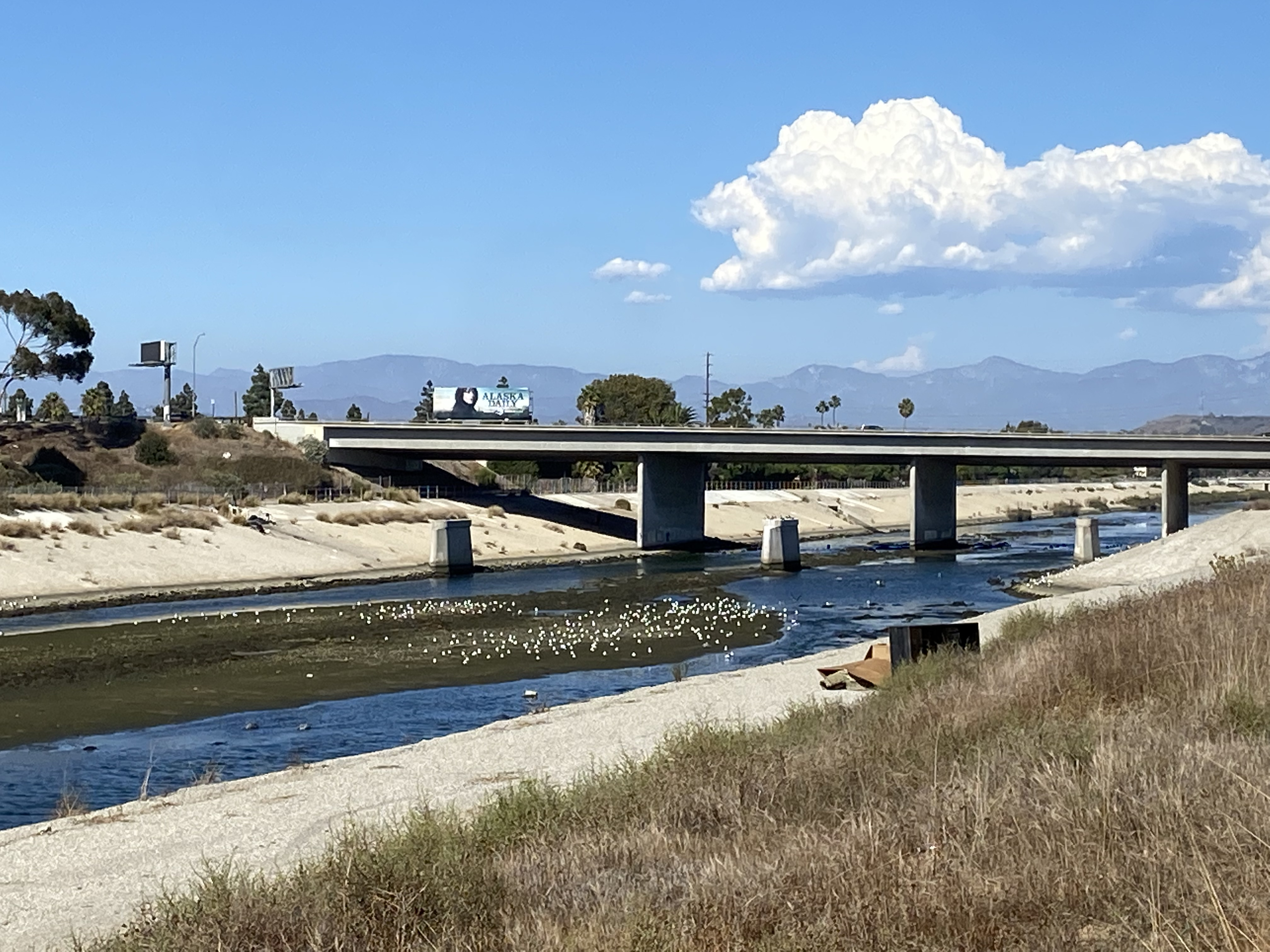
Pylons from former rail bridge of Inglewood-Venice Line route over Ballona Creek, close to the location of Alla station

=== Settlement ===
In 1921 the Los Angeles Herald reported, “At Alla station, between Redondo and Playa del Rey, 25 Mexican families were reported marooned in a wash. Their little homes had been built on high piles and deep water was flowing through the wash.” The USGS-produced “Venice Quadrangle” topographical maps for both 1923 and 1930 show approximately 10 homes established along the tracks just to the southwest of Alla Junction.

== See also ==
- Motordrome, California
- Alsace, California
- Machado, California
- Cypress Grove, California
