= Centinela Avenue =

Street in Los Angeles County, United States

Coordinates: 33.976337°N 118.358606°W

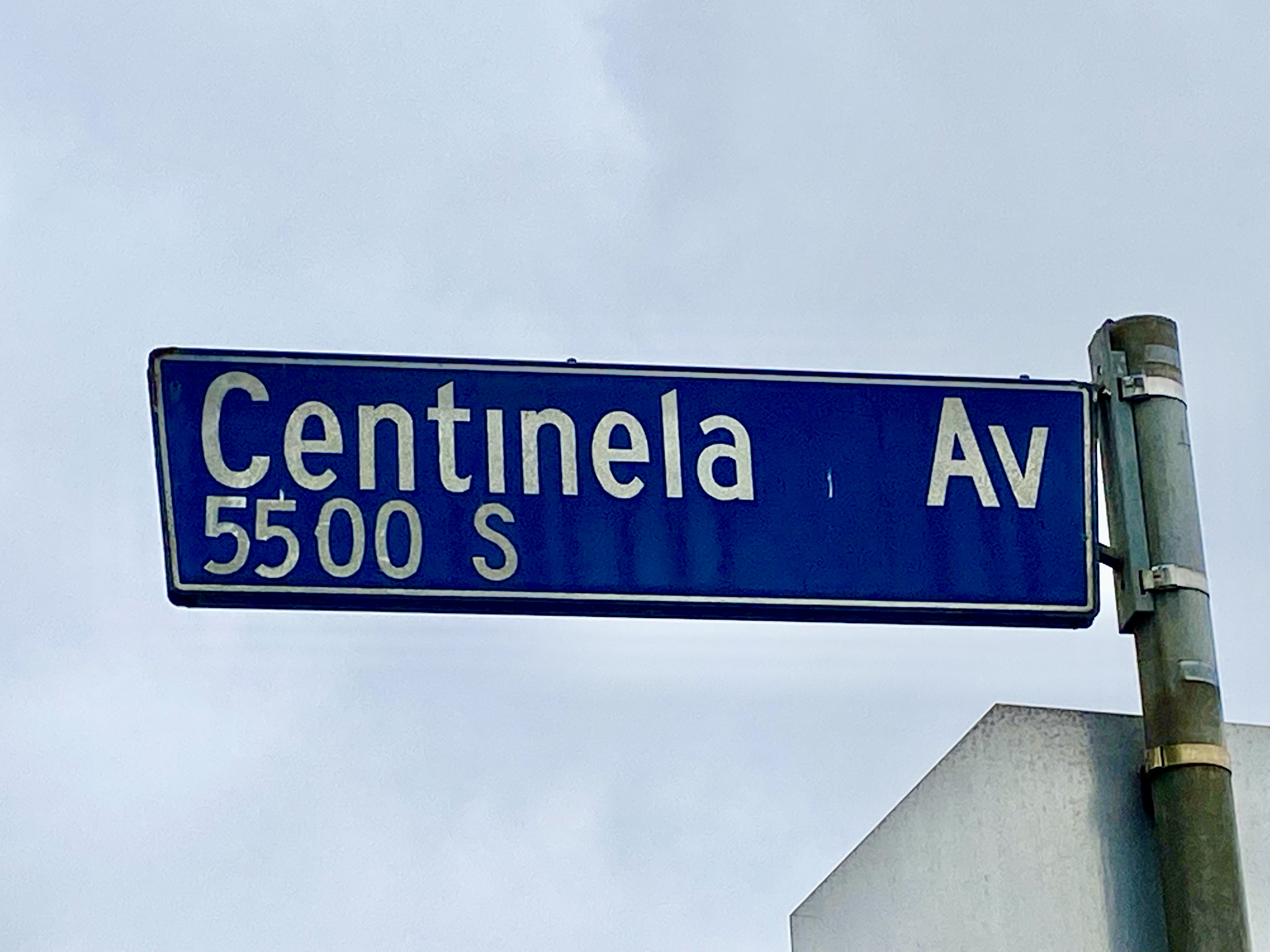
- Interactive map of Centinela Avenue
- Namesake: Rancho Aguaje de la Centinela
- Length: 10.2 mi (16.4 km)
- Location: Los Angeles County, California, United States
- Northern end: San Vincente Boulevard, Brentwood
- Major junctions: I-10 in Los Angeles; SR 2 at the Santa Monica–Los Angeles line I-405 in Culver City
- Southern end: Florence Avenue in Inglewood

Centinela Avenue is a 10.2 mile (16.4 km) major street in the Westside region of Los Angeles County, California.

== Geography ==
Centinela Avenue is a major thoroughfare in Culver City, Inglewood, Ladera Heights, Mar Vista, Santa Monica, and West Los Angeles.

It is named after the 19th century Rancho Aguaje de la Centinela, whose site of former ranchlands it passes through. Bundy Drive is named for Tom Bundy, tennis player and developer of the Miracle Mile.

=== Route ===
The street runs primarily north–south, with a southern east–west section.

Centinela Avenue is not a continuous street but is separated into northern and southern sections, with a jog connected by Ocean Park Boulevard.

==== Northern section ====
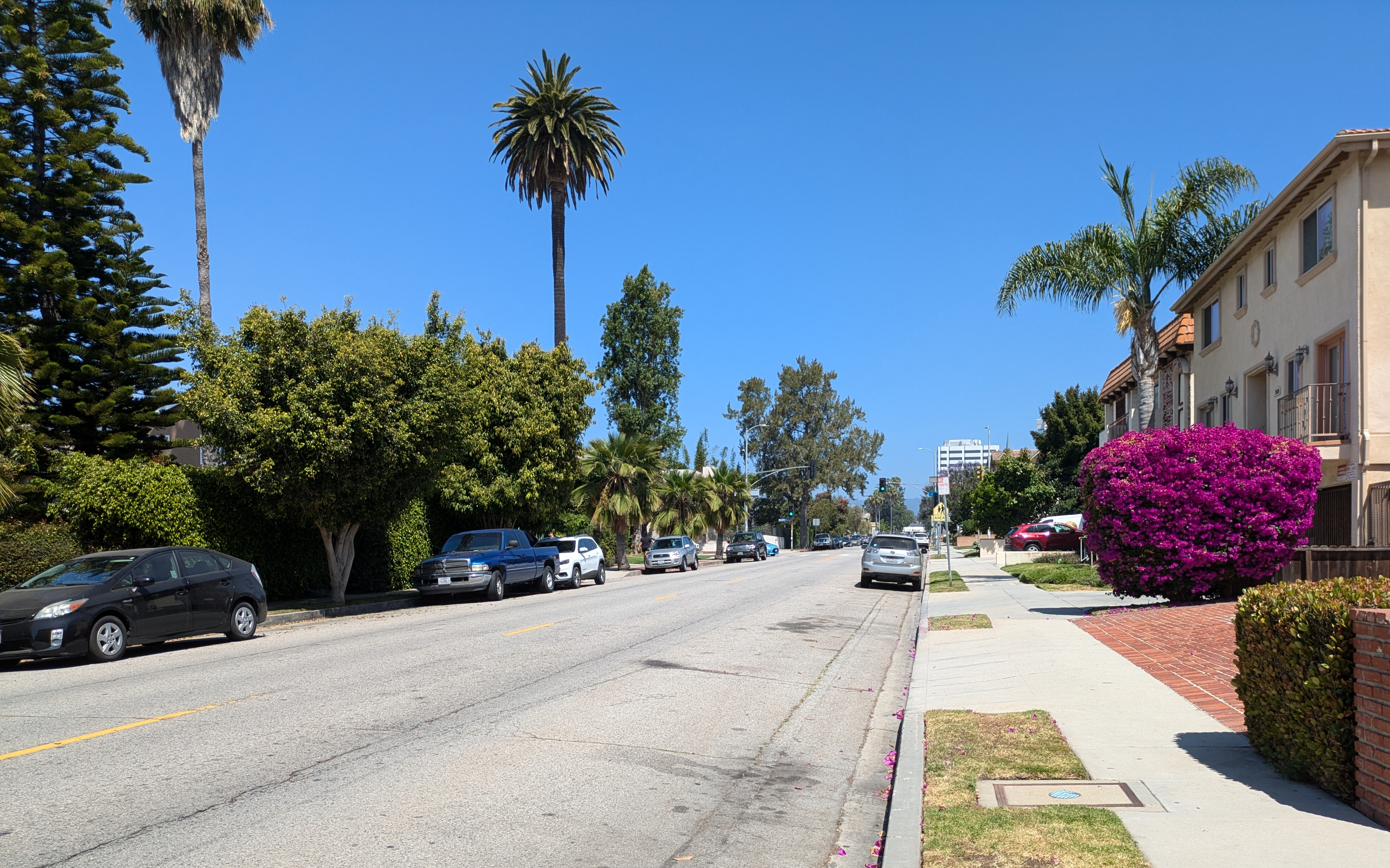
Northern section

The northern section of Centinela Avenue is a minor two lane street. It begins near the Brentwood Country Club in Brentwood, Los Angeles. (Note: (it had an earlier designation of Cambridge St.)) It proceeds south, ending at Ocean Park Boulevard and the Santa Monica Airport, a block west of the southern section of Centinela Avenue. It is the official dividing line between the cities of Santa Monica and Los Angeles.

This section of Centinela has two discontinuities. Going north, staying on Centinela requires a half-block jog west at Olympic Boulevard, and another half-block jog northeast at Wilshire Boulevard.

==== Southern section ====
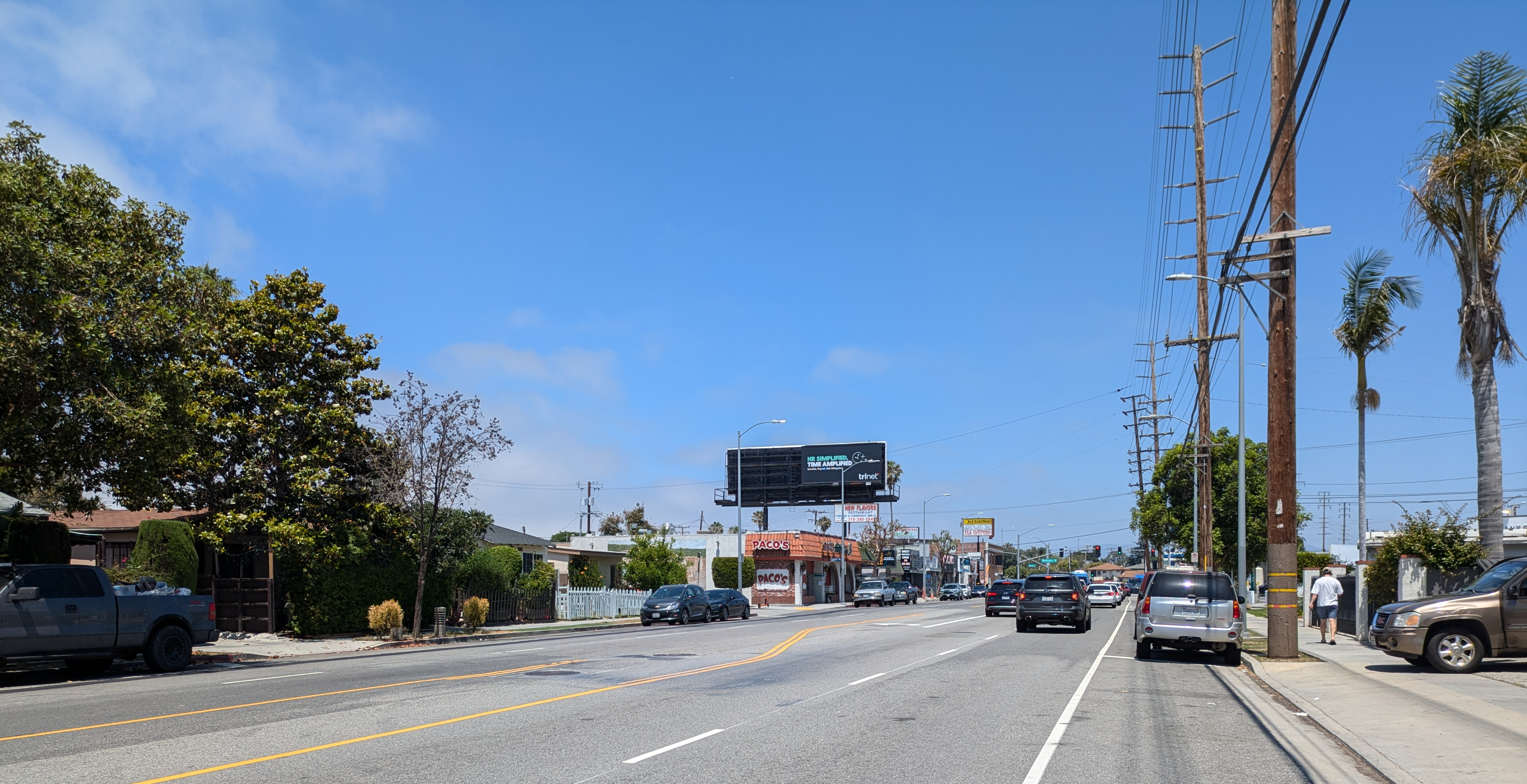
Southern section

The southern section of Centinela Avenue is a four-lane major thoroughfare. It starts off as Bundy Drive at Sunset Boulevard in Brentwood, passing through West Los Angeles to the Santa Monica Airport, where at Stanwood Drive its name changes to Centinela Avenue.

Centinela crosses and offers entry points to the following bike paths: Expo Bike Path (see Expo/Bundy station), Culver Boulevard Median Bike Path and Ballona Creek Bike Path.

At its intersection with Jefferson Boulevard, Centinela Avenue angles southeastward to become an east–west street. It runs parallel to/on the south of Slauson Avenue. Centinela Avenue ends at the intersection with Florence Avenue in Inglewood. Centinela Park and Centinela Hospital Medical Center are located within here.

== History ==
The southern section was laid out in the 1890s. As reported by the Los Angeles Times’ Inglewood column in 1896, the route was laid out to connect Mesmer Station along the Santa Fe Railroad line (later the Venice–Inglewood line of the Pacific Electric) and “the brick-kiln northerly of here” (property that later became Centinela Park). The proposed line of the 60 ft (18 m)-wide road ran along “the northernly boundary of the Centinela grant” and rights-of-way were offered by Daniel Freeman and one Mrs. Cook.

== Public transport ==
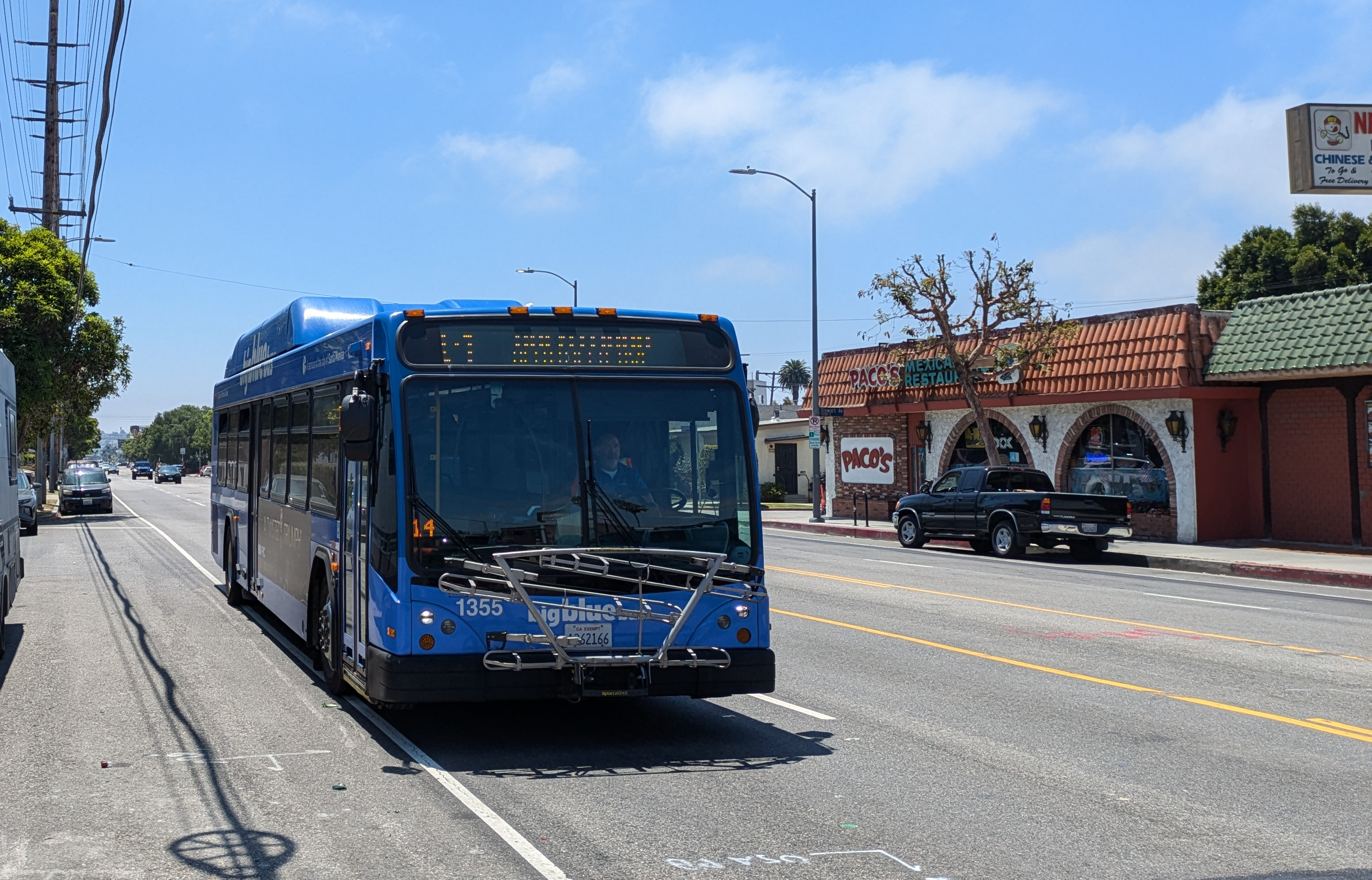
Big Blue Bus on Centinela Avenue

The north–south portion of the avenue is served by Santa Monica Transit line 14 and the west–east portion by Metro Local line 110.

The Bundy/Expo Metro station of the Metro E Line is located on Bundy Drive south of Olympic Boulevard.

== Notable residents ==
Nicole Brown Simpson lived at 875 South Bundy Drive with her and O. J. Simpson's children, Sydney and Justin, at the time Nicole and Ron Goldman were murdered in the courtyard of that address, on June 12, 1994. The house sat empty for two years, until the next owner extensively remodeled it and had the address changed.
