= Jefferson/USC station =

Los Angeles Metro Rail station

Jefferson/USC
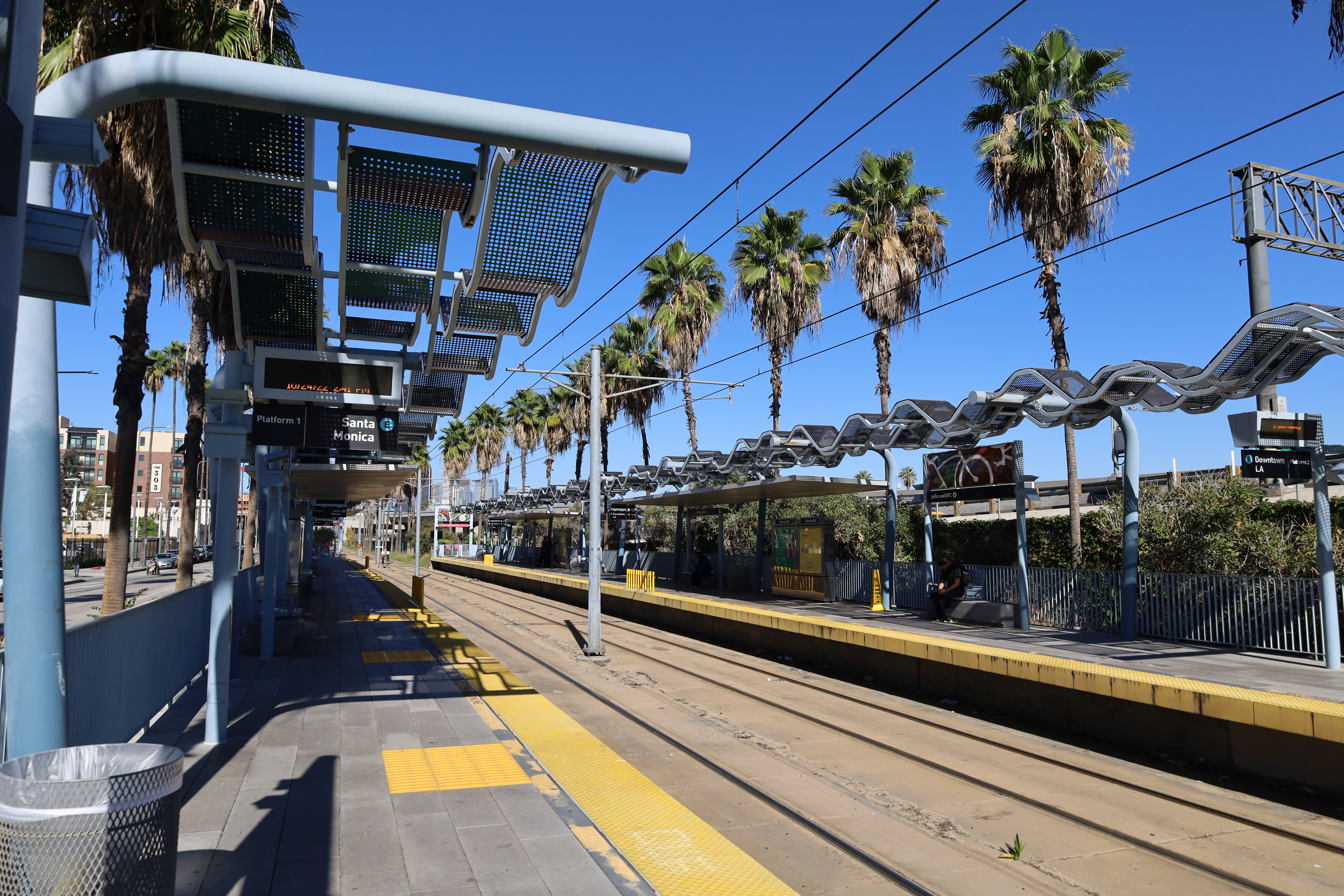
- Jefferson/USC station platform in 2022

General information
- Location: 3214 South Flower Street; Los Angeles, California
- Coordinates: 34.0214°N 118.2787°W
- Owner: Los Angeles County Metropolitan Transportation Authority
- Platforms: 2 side platforms
- Tracks: 2
- Connections: LADOT DASH; Los Angeles Metro Bus

Construction
- Structure type: At-grade
- Cycle facilities: Metro Bike Share station and racks
- Accessible: Yes

History
- Opened: April 28, 2012

Passengers
- FY 2025: 1,306 (avg. wkdy boardings)

Services
Preceding station	Metro Rail	Following station
Expo Park/USC toward Santa Monica	E Line	LATTC/Ortho Institute toward East LA
Location

Jefferson/USC station is an at-grade light rail station on the E Line of the Los Angeles Metro Rail system. The station is located alongside Flower Street at its intersection with Jefferson Boulevard, after which the station is named, along with the nearby University of Southern California (USC). The station also has nearby stops for the J Line of the Los Angeles Metro Busway system, southbound buses stop on Flower Street, across from the station and northbound buses stop on Figueroa Street, one block to the west. Jefferson/USC station serves the North University Park in neighborhood of Los Angeles.

The station is located across the street from the Galen Center, an indoor arena that is the home of the USC basketball and volleyball teams. During the 2028 Summer Olympics, the station will serve spectators traveling to and from venues located on the USC campus including Badminton and rhythmic gymnastics at the Galen Center and the Media Village/Main Press Center at the University Village residential and retail center.

== Service ==
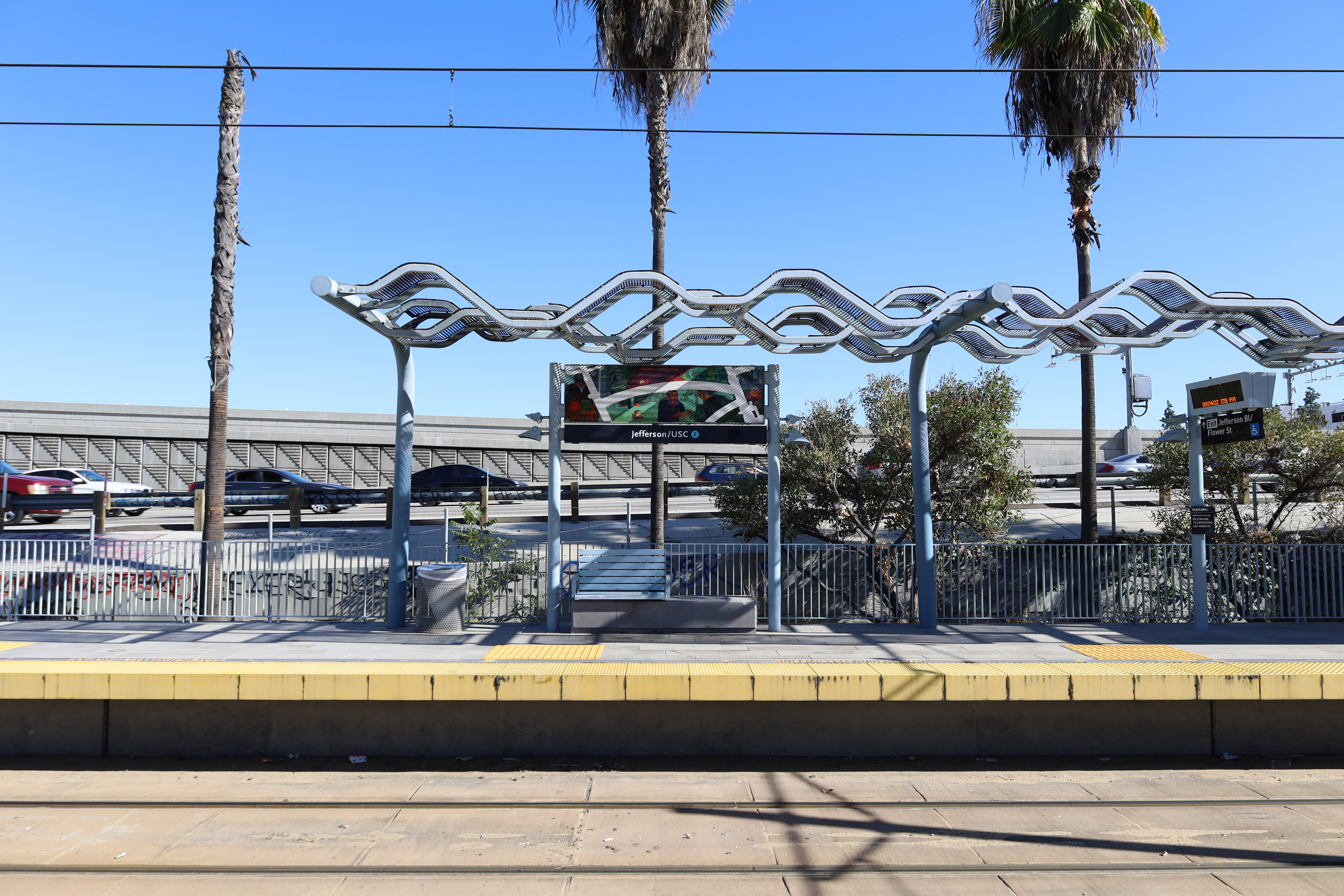
Interstate 110 immediately adjacent to the station platform

=== Hours and frequency ===
E Line service hours are from approximately 4:30 a.m. and 11:45 p.m daily. Trains operate every 8 minutes during peak hours, Monday to Friday. Trains run every 10 minutes, during midday on weekdays and weekends, from 9:00 a.m. to 7:00 p.m. Night and early morning service is approximately every 20 minutes every day.

=== Connections ===
As of December 15, 2024, the following connections are available:

- LADOT DASH: F, King-East
- Los Angeles Metro Bus: 2, 38, 81, 102

== Notable places nearby ==
The station is within walking distance of the following notable places:

- Galen Center
- Shrine Auditorium
- USC Village
- University of Southern California

== Station artwork ==
The station's art was created by artist Samuel Rodriguez. The installation, entitled "Urban Dualities" is a visual narrative that includes fragments of building facades, vintage rail cars, realistically rendered human figures, and fictional characters."
