= Eddie Hasha =

American motorcycle racer (1890–1912)

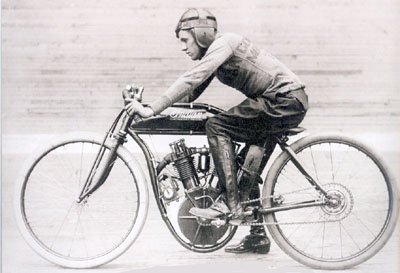
- Hasha racing at Newark Motordrome in 1912
- Nationality: American
- Born: 1890, Waco, Texas, U.S.
- Died: September 8, 1912 (aged 21-22) Newark Motordrome, Newark, New Jersey, U.S.
- Years active: 1911–1912

William Edward Hasha (died September 8, 1912) was an American motorcycle racer on board tracks early in the twentieth century. His death contributed to the demise of the board tracks. He was nicknamed the "Texas Cyclone" since he was from Waco, Texas, United States.

== Racing career ==
Hasha began racing on board tracks in 1911 at Denver. He rode an 8-valve Indian motorcycle. In May 1911, Hasha attained a speed of 95 miles per hour (153 km/h) at the Playa del Rey, California, motordrome, setting a record for the mile. In 1912, Hasha beat all of the established stars at the Los Angeles Motordrome, and set professional records in the process. He then headed from the western United States to the east.

At one point, Hasha went into a brief hiatus when he worked at a Harley-Davidson dealership in Dallas, having known Arthur Davidson as a close friend and business partner, who at one time loaned a racing motorcycle to Hasha in a 1910 race, defeating Bob Stubbs at Waco, Texas; he went back into motorcycle racing soon afterwards.

== Death ==
Hasha competed at the Newark Motordrome in Newark, New Jersey, on September 8, 1912, in front of 5000 spectators. After the feature event was completed, he competed in a five-mile handicap race against five other riders. Among them was Ray Seymour, who held the world record. Hasha and Seymour were the only two riders to race without a handicap; the other four were given a one-lap handicap. Hasha held a slight lead at the end of the first lap. While leading on the third lap, Hasha's motorcycle began to misfire. He reached his hand down to make an adjustment, and was overtaken by Seymour. Hasha accelerated, picking up enough speed to close on Seymour. Traveling at 92 miles per hour (148 km/h), Hasha's motorcycle suddenly turned sharply into the rail surrounding the track. The bike rode the rail for around 100 feet (30 m), killing a boy who had put his head over the rail to watch the race. The machine then struck a large post. Hasha flew out of the racing area into the grandstands, and was killed instantly. Three other boys and a young man were also killed. The now-riderless machine dropped back onto the racing surface into the path of last-place rider Johnny Albright. The motorcycle hit the Denver rider in the shoulder and he slid down the track between the two machines. Albright died four hours later without regaining consciousness. Spectators panicked at the sight of a spinning motorcycle heading their way. Several people had broken bones and flesh wounds as they fought and trampled each other in the rush to get out of the way. It took over an hour to clear the grandstands. Medics came from all parts of the city to attend to the injured and those who had fainted.

== Impact on board tracks ==
Hasha's death made the front page of The New York Times. Having opened earlier that year on July 4, the board track was shut down and never reopened. The deaths brought comparisons between board track racing and Roman gladiatorial contests. Short 1/4–1/3 mi (0.4–0.5 km) board tracks began to close after they were labeled "murderdromes" by the media.
