= Invasion of the Prostate Snatchers =

- Author: Mark Scholz, Ralph H. Blum
- Language: English, French
- Genre: Medical
- Publisher: Other Press, Random House
- Media type: Print (Hardcover, Paperback) e-Book
- Pages: 320 (Hardcover), 304 (Paperback)
- ISBN: 978-1-59051-342-2 (Hardcover), ISBN 978-1-59051-515-0 (Paperback), ISBN 978-1-59051-385-9 (e-book)

Invasion of the Prostate Snatchers is a book written by Dr. Mark Scholz and Ralph Blum in 2010. Invasion of the Prostate Snatchers is distributed and sold online and in book stores through Random House Publisher Services via Other Press Publishing.
