= Venice–Inglewood Line =

Historic rail route in California

Venice–Inglewood
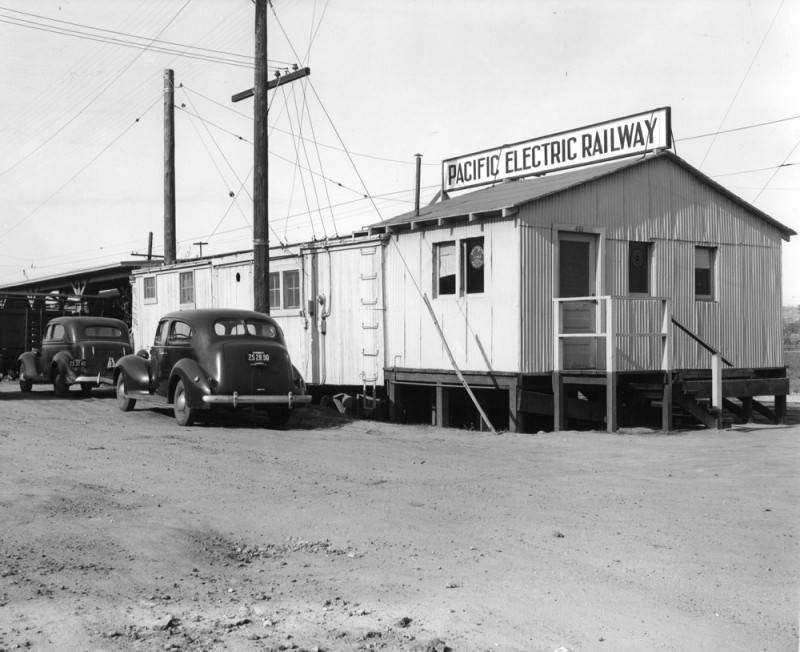
- 401 N. Eucalyptus Avenue, Inglewood, c. 1937 (Los Angeles Photographers Photo Collection, LAPL)

Overview
- Locale: Los Angeles County, California
- Termini: Ocean Park; Inglewood

Service
- Type: Interurban
- System: Pacific Electric
- Operator: Pacific Electric
- Daily ridership: <1 (1927)

History
- Opened: c. October 18, 1902 (under Los Angeles Pacific Railroad)
- Closed: September 13, 1928

Technical
- Line length: 9.056 mi (14.574 km)
- Track gauge: 1,435 mm (4 ft 8 1/2 in) standard gauge
- Electrification: Overhead line, 600 V DC

The Venice–Inglewood Line is a former railway line in Los Angeles County, California. The route was established by the Atchison, Topeka and Santa Fe Railway in 1887 before eventually being absorbed into the Pacific Electric interurban railway system. Service under electrification was very sparse, providing a suburban route between Venice and Inglewood.

== History ==
=== California Central ===
The branch line was built by the Atchison, Topeka and Santa Fe Railway, opening in June 1887 from Inglewood to Port Ballona (on the site of today's Playa del Rey).

Los Angeles and Santa Monica Railroad was incorporated on January 6, 1886, to build a railroad line from downtown Los Angeles to a depot on the Santa Monica Bay in Los Angeles County. In March 1886, the Los Angeles Herald reported that the "surveyors of the Santa Monica Railroad have just crossed the S.P. track at Ballona, just where the county road crossed that track near La Ballona station. The terminus is finally fixed at South Santa Monica, near where the old Juan Bernard wharf is."

California Central Railway purchased the Los Angeles and Santa Monica Railroad, but the Los Angeles and Santa Monica Railroad company had not started any work on any rail lines, California Central Railway did get needed right of way land. The 18.03 mi (29.02 km) line was opened for business on September 7, 1887, with stops (from northeast to southwest) at Ballona Junction, Nadeau Park, Baldwin, Slauson, Wildeson, Hyde Park, Inglewood, Danville, Mesmer, and Port Ballona. A train left Los Angeles at 9:15 a.m. on the one-hour journey and returned from Port Ballona at 4 p.m.

=== Santa Fe and Santa Monica ===
The oceanside terminal was moved to Ocean Park, under the April 4, 1892 charter of the Santa Fe and Santa Monica "to build from a point at or near 'Mesmer Station' on line of Southern California Railway Company between Inglewood and Ballona, Los Angeles County, to Town of Santa Monica."

=== Los Angeles Pacific & Pacific Electric ===
The route was acquired by the Los Angeles Pacific Railroad on March 21, 1902, and was shortly after electrified for service by that October. Service was limited to a single daily car. After Pacific Electric absorbed the company in 1911, service consisted of a single round trip mixed train (combined passenger and freight) daily except Sunday, when additional trains were run. Passenger trips ended after September 13, 1928. A single early morning westbound trip of the Venice Short Line to Redondo Beach was routed to Alla between 1936 and 1940.

=== Southern Pacific ===
According to Abandoned Rails, “The line also served produce warehouses and other small businesses until the 1960s. Under the ownership of the Southern Pacific, most of the rails remained in place until 1977.” In 1976, Southern Pacific applied to abandon the track past Alla through Machado to Venice.

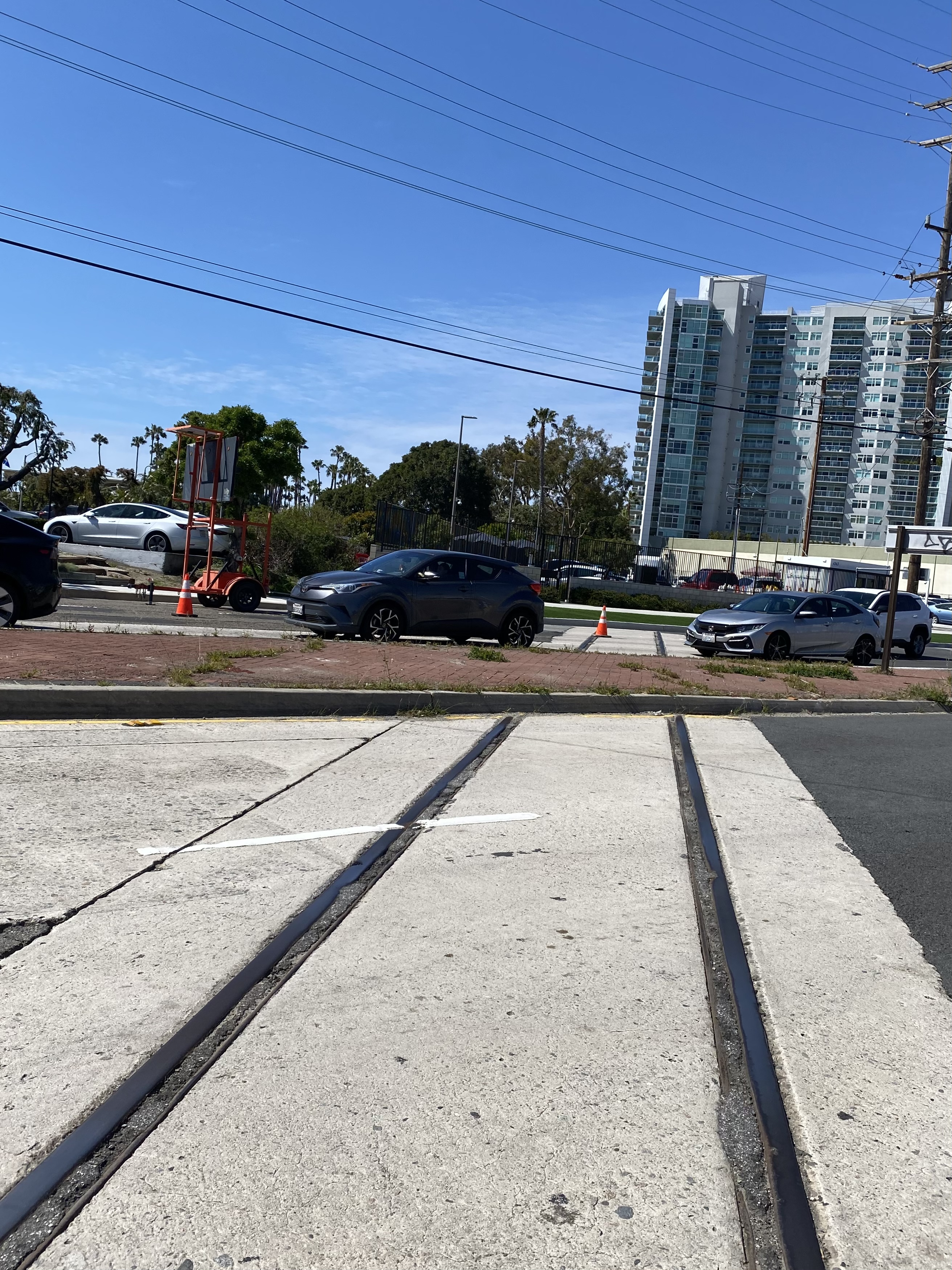
Venice–Inglewood tracks crossing Lincoln Blvd. toward Marina Del Rey

All tracks along the route had been removed or paved over by 1981. Though much of the right-of-way has been built over, most of it has not been merged with neighboring parcels. The former route can be traced through a series of oddly-shaped, narrow structures, parking lots, and strips of vacant land. The former embankment can still be seen along the south side of Rogers Park in Inglewood.

== Route ==
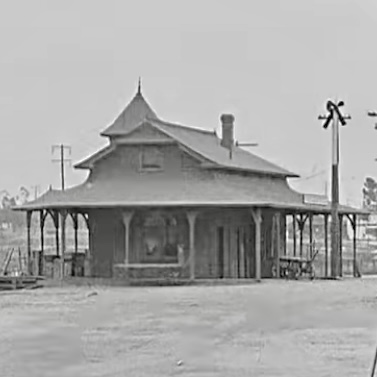
Inglewood depot, as pictured in the 1920 Buster Keaton short, One Week

The Venice–Inglewood Line was a single-track line in a private right of way. The line originated at the Pacific Electric Inglewood Depot and the Atchison, Topeka and Santa Fe Railway junction at Ivy Avenue and Ballona Street in Inglewood.

From the station, the line ran westerly and northwesterly following intermittent sections of Ballona Street, Hyde Park Boulevard and Thorneburn Street while crossing La Cienega Boulevard at-grade and passing under La Tijera Boulevard. The section of right-of-way from La Cienega to Centinela remains as a vacant strip parallel to the Centinela Creek flood control channel, with the undercrossing beneath La Tijera still visible. The section east of La Cienega has been partially developed with a storage facility, but continues along the north side of Oak street as an empty strip planted with trees and grass.

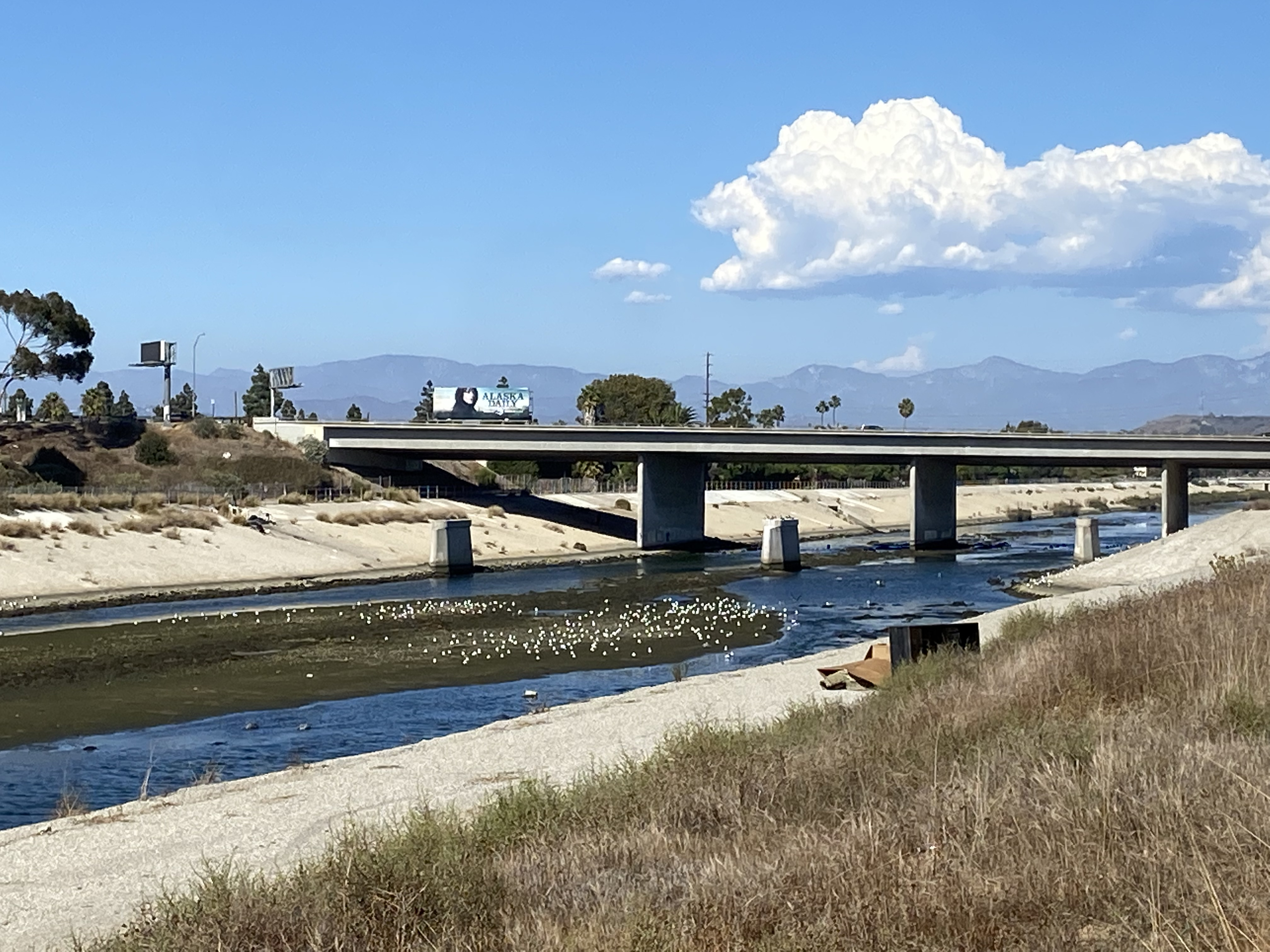
Rail bridge pylons remaining from Ballona Creek crossing of Venice–Inglewood Line; 90 freeway to the rear

Continuing northwesterly, the line ran approximately one-half mile (0.8 km) before paralleling Centinela Avenue (on the south) and crossing Sepulveda Boulevard at-grade. Following Centinela Avenue, the single track line curved westerly and southwesterly to run between Centinela and the Hughes Airport. The line ran between the runaways and the south side of Centinela–Jefferson Boulevard. It then crossed Jefferson Boulevard to head northwesterly and cross Ballona Creek. Nothing remains of most of this section, as the Hughes Airport was redeveloped into the Playa Vista neighborhood. However a small portion of the right-of-way remains on the south side of Centinela just west of Sepulveda, as a derelict strip of dirt that interrupts the sidewalk, and support columns for the crossing are still visible in Ballona Creek.

The Venice–Inglewood Line continued northwesterly from Ballona Creek crossing Culver Boulevard and the adjacent Redondo Beach via Playa del Rey Line at-grade to Alla Wye. It then ran adjacent to California State Route 90 on a separate right of way which remains vacant. Next, the track crossed Lincoln Boulevard (where a small section of track is still visible) and ran northwesterly to follow intermittent sections of Oxford Avenue while crossing Washington Street and then Washington Boulevard. This portion of track was subdivided for residential development, creating a long row of unusually small, narrow houses along Oxford Avenue.

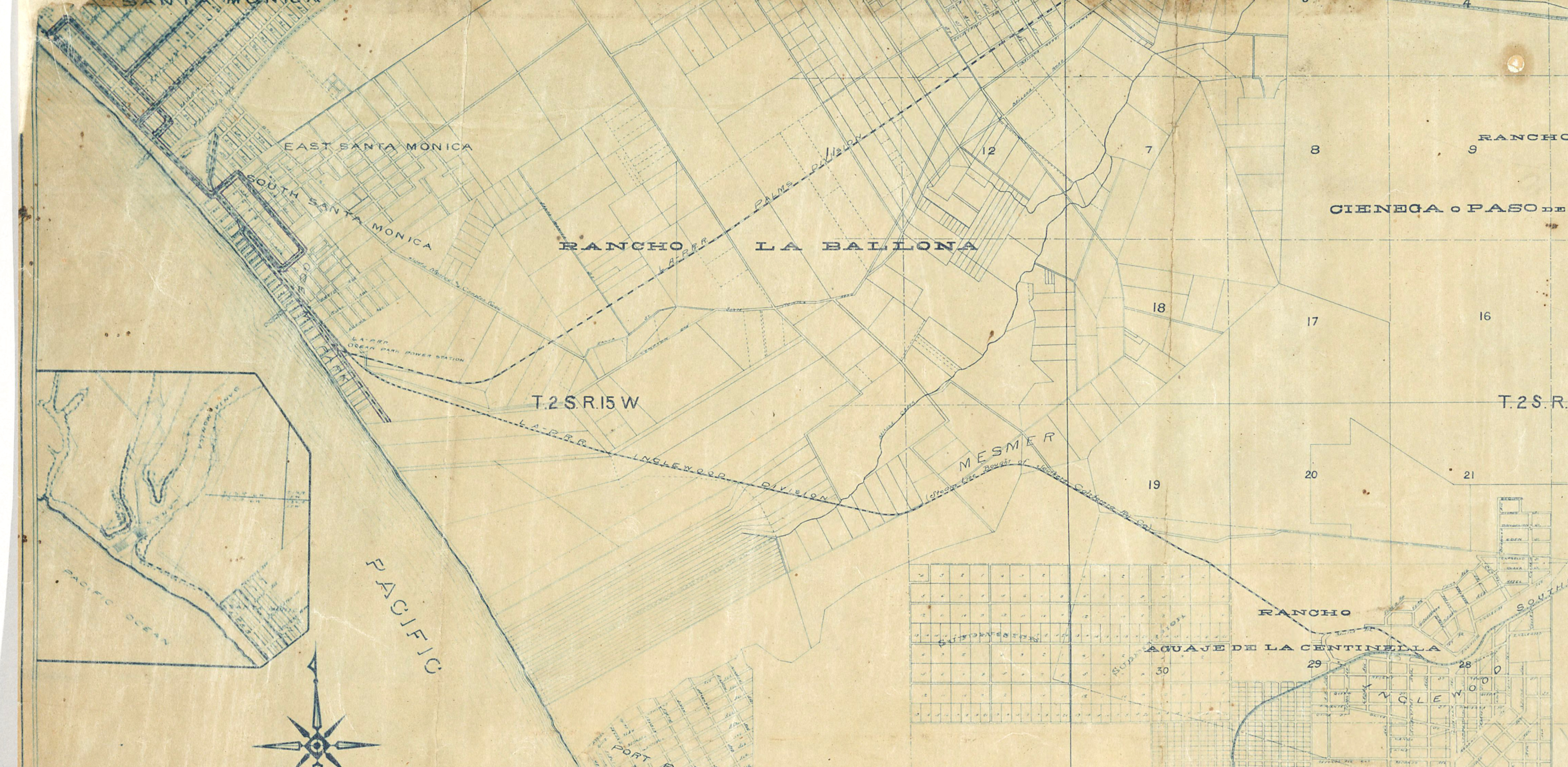
Inglewood Division...steam line bought of Southern California Ry. Co. (map c. 1900)

The line then crossed Venice Boulevard (with the Venice Short Line) and continued northwesterly following the west side of Electric Avenue through Venice to cross Main Street and reach the terminus of the line at the Ocean Park Carhouse (west of Main Street between Paloma and Thornton Avenues in Venice, a site which would later house a Metro bus yard). Another source mentions a Santa Monica terminus at 5th Avenue (and Electric). The distance covered by the Venice–Inglewood route was 9.056 miles (14.574 km).

== Ridership ==
While the Santa Fe experienced strong initial ridership on the line, declining passenger loads contributed to the company's decision to sell the route. A survey by the California Railroad Commission for the week ending September 3, 1927 revealed that a single passenger had ridden the line in the time period; eight trips were made the entire month.
