= Marina Del Rey Hospital =

Coordinates: 33°58′55″N 118°26′23″W

- Cedars-Sinai Health System

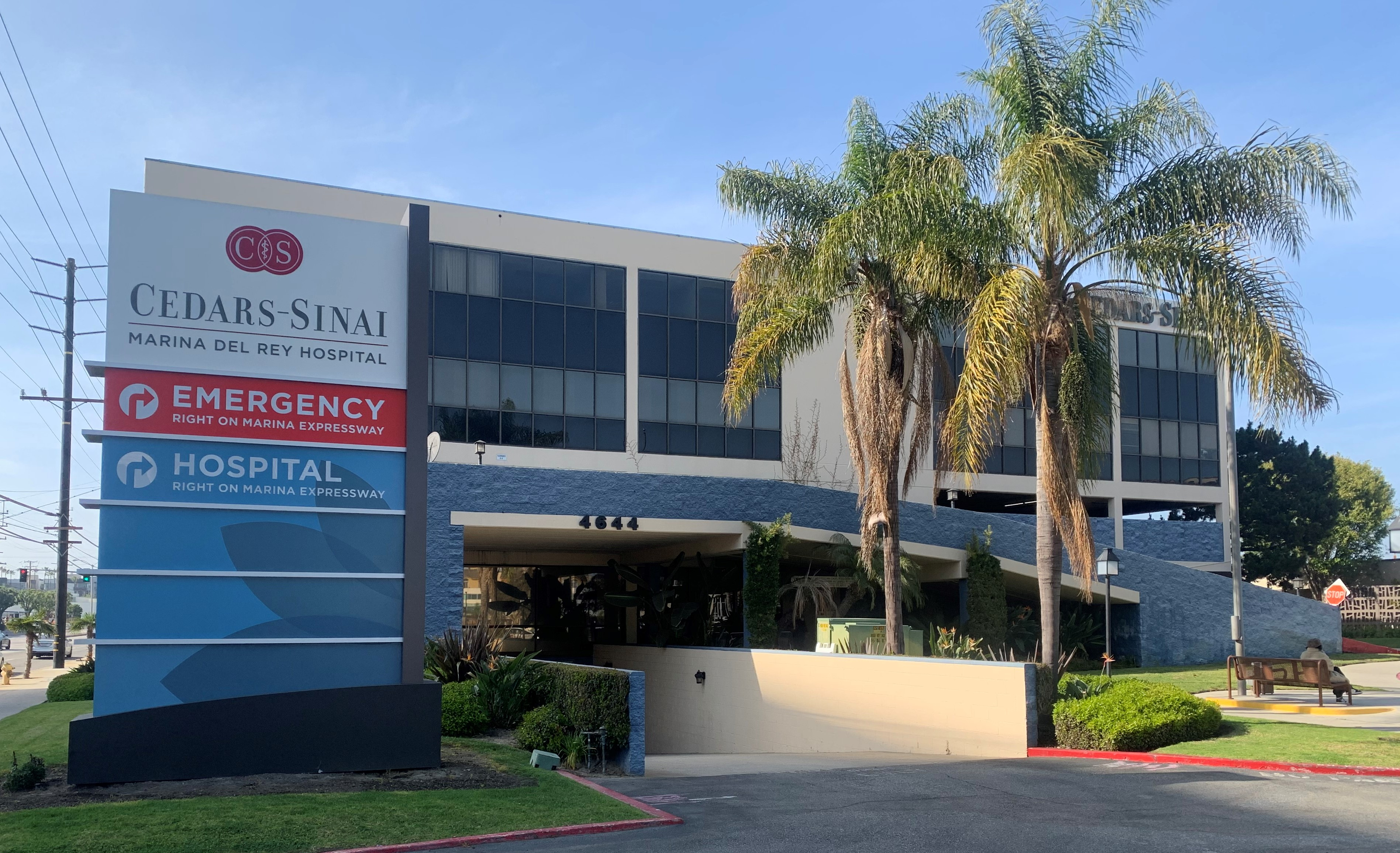

Geography
- Location: Los Angeles, California, United States

Organization
- Care system: Nonprofit
- Type: Community
- Affiliated university: None

Services
- Beds: 133

History
- Opened: 1969

Links
- Website: www.marinahospital.com
- Lists: Hospitals in California

Marina Del Rey Hospital is a 133-bed acute care, Joint Commission accredited hospital in Los Angeles offering general acute medical services and 24/7 emergency care. Marina Del Rey Hospital, originally known as Marina Mercy Hospital underwent construction in 1969 and became a part of Cedars-Sinai Health System in September 2015.

== History ==
In 1980, the hospital was purchased by the Sisters of St. Joseph of Carondelet, founders of Daniel Freeman Memorial Hospital in Inglewood, California. They renamed the Marina del Rey facility Daniel Freeman Marina Hospital. The two Daniel Freeman hospitals were acquired in 2001 by Tenet Healthcare. The name of the Marina hospital was changed in 2004 when the Hospital transferred to the Centinela Freeman HealthSystem, and became the Centinela-Freeman Regional Medical Center, Marina Campus. In November 2007, the hospital was renamed Marina Del Rey Hospital.

Marina Del Rey Hospital is a community hospital that also offers specialty care in spine, orthopedics, surgical weight loss, minimally invasive general surgery and emergency care services.

The hospital's clinic for spine services is Marina Spine Center led by Robert Watkins IV M.D., Robert Watkins III, M.D., David Chang, M.D. and Sean Bond, P.A.

The hospital's clinic for surgical weight loss is Marina Weight Loss Center, formerly known as L.A. Bariatrics, is led by Jeremy Korman, M.D. The center is accredited by the Joint Commission and holds the Bariatric Surgery Center of Excellence designation by the American College of Surgeon and American Society for Metabolic and Bariatric Surgery. Marina Weight Loss Center is registered as a Medicare approved bariatric facility since 2006.

In September 2015, it was announced that Cedars-Sinai Medical Group had purchased Marina Del Rey Hospital from a partnership led by Los Angeles-based private investment firm Westridge Capital; terms were not disclosed, but public records indicated that the hospital property had traded hands for $25.3 million in mid-August 2015. News reports characterized the acquisition as part of a consolidation trend in the United States healthcare sector among hospitals and health insurance companies. Cedars-Sinai Medical Group has stated that as an affiliate hospital, Marina Del Rey will revert to nonprofit status.
