= Centinela Hospital Medical Center =

Coordinates: 33.950274°N 118.348215°W

- Prime Healthcare Services

Geography
- Location: 555 E Hardy St., Inglewood, California, United States

Organization
- Care system: Private, Not-for-profit
- Type: Teaching
- Affiliated university: None

Services
- Beds: 369

History
- Founded: 1924

Links
- Website: https://www.centinelamed.com/
- Lists: Hospitals in California

Centinela Hospital Medical Center is a non-profit hospital located in Inglewood, California United States.

== History ==
The hospital serves 369 beds, and also offers a level II emergency department, orthopedic care, advanced cardiac services, and peripheral artery disease treatment.

== Prime Healthcare Services ==
Prior to being purchased by Prime Healthcare Services in 2007, the hospital was linked to the Daniel Freeman Campus.
