= Jefferson Boulevard =

Street in Los Angeles and Culver City, California

- Namesake: Thomas Jefferson
- Length: 9.71 mi (15.63 km)
- Location: Los Angeles and Culver City, California
- Nearest metro station: : La Cienega/Jefferson; Jefferson/USC
- West end: Sepulveda Boulevard in Playa Del Rey
- East end: Central Avenue in Los Angeles

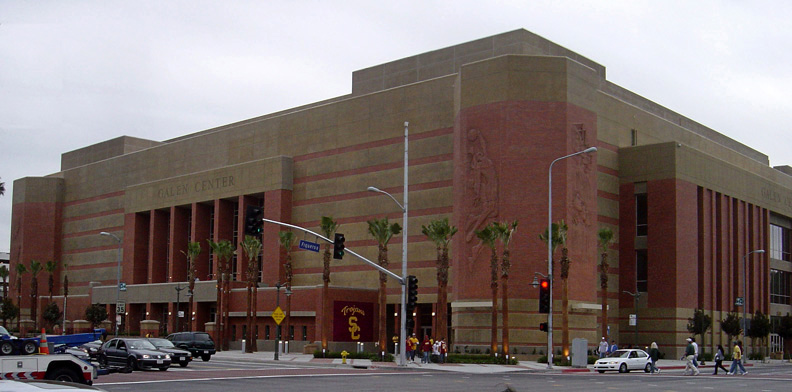
USC Trojans' Galen Center at Jefferson Blvd. and Figueroa St.

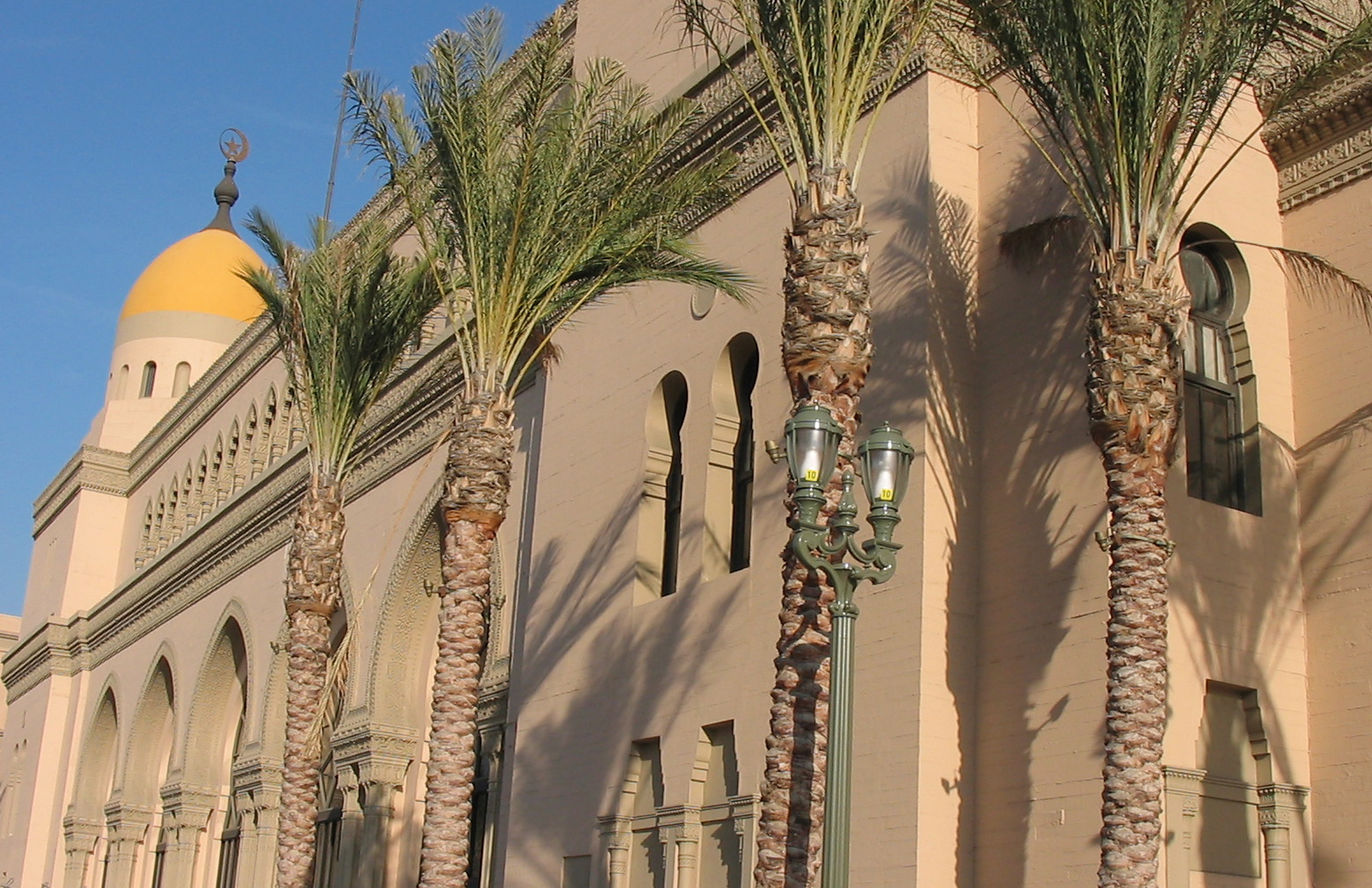
Shrine Auditorium

Jefferson Boulevard is a major arterial road in Los Angeles County. Its eastern terminus is at Central Avenue east of Exposition Park. At its entrance to Culver City, it splits with National Boulevard. North of Sawtelle Boulevard, it merges with Sepulveda Boulevard. Jefferson returns before Slauson Avenue and ends at Culver Boulevard; its western terminus is near Playa Del Rey.

== Education and transportation ==
University of Southern California (USC) is located on Jefferson Boulevard from Figueroa Street to Vermont Avenue. Its sports center complex, the Galen Center, is located at the southeast corner of Jefferson and Figueroa.

Bus service is operated through Jefferson Boulevard between Playa Vista and West L.A. Transit Center by Culver City Transit line 4, between West LA Transit Center and USC by Metro Local line 38, and east of USC by Metro Local line 102. The Metro E Line serves two light rail stations at Jefferson: one at Flower Street near USC and the other on La Cienega Boulevard.

== Little New Orleans ==
Los Angeles saw an influx of Creoles of color to the area in the mid-1900s, to the point that by the 1950s a portion of Jefferson Boulevard and Jefferson Park (a neighborhood that ran partially along Jefferson Boulevard) was unofficially dubbed "Little New Orleans". The population was predominantly Creole and held many Creole-owned businesses such as Harold & Belle's creole restaurant and the Big Loaf Bakery, which was considered to be the "only place in Los Angeles that made New Orleans style Baguettes".

== Notable landmarks ==
- Galen Center
- Shrine Auditorium
