= Los Angeles Recreation and Park Commission =

Supervisory committee organized 1904

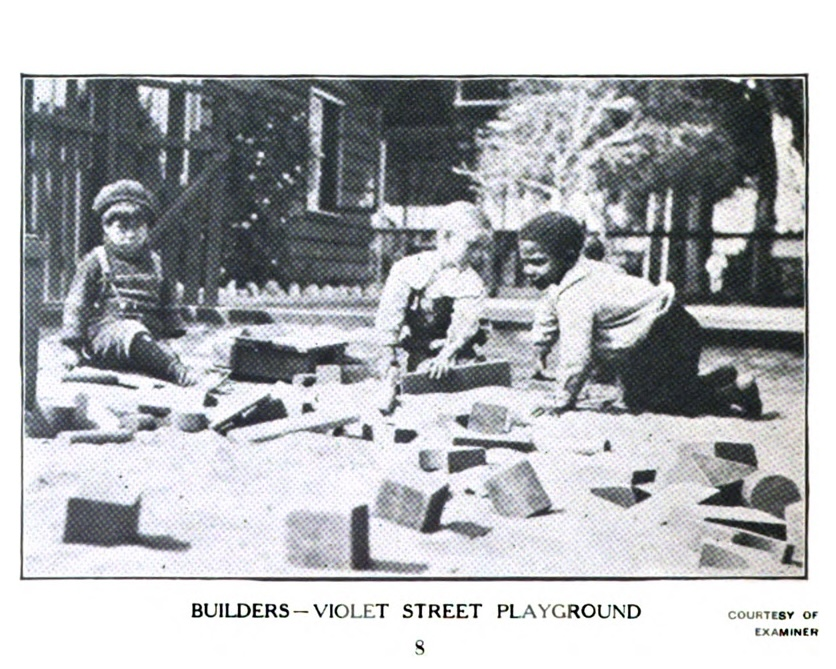
"Builders, Violet Street Playground," (Los Angeles Playground Commission annual report, 1908)

The City of Los Angeles park and playground departments, also referred to as commissions or committees, were the two municipal government agencies which managed parks and recreational facilities in Los Angeles, California, before the current Department of Recreation and Parks was chartered in 1947. The Park Department was founded with the first Los Angeles city charter in 1889. The Playground Department was founded in 1904 and was renamed the Department of Playground and Recreation in the 1925 charter.

== History ==
The Los Angeles Department of Parks was organized in 1889. The Los Angeles Playground Commission was organized by the city council in 1904 as an unpaid five-person commission; the commissioners had authority to hire a superintendent and staff. Arabella Page Rodman served as president from the time of its organization. By 1908, they had created two playgrounds, at Violet Street Park and Echo Park, and a Spanish Renaissance-style recreation center intended "offer something of what the social settlement or YMCA building furnishes." Planned for 1910 were playgrounds at Hazard Playground and Slauson Avenue Playground. By 1914 Downey Playground and Exposition Park Athletic Field had been established. A municipal bathhouse and a "Mexican settlement" bathhouse were established in 1915. Mrs. Leafie Sloane-Orcutt was president of the Los Angeles Park Commission from 1916 to 1920. She was the first woman park commission president in the United States and the first woman park commissioner in California.

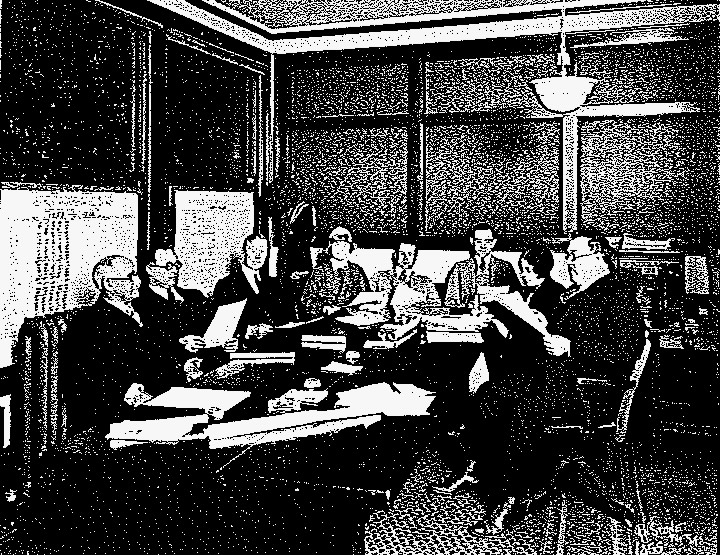
Superintendent Frank Shearer and members of the Parks Commission meet at City Hall in 1927

In 1934 and 1935, the Park Commission was heavily involved in the planning for Griffith Observatory, including approving exhibits such as a seismograph, a presentation on the telescope manufacturing process, and a model of an oil field. Eagle Rock Park was conceived at a 1936 meeting of the Park Commission chief and the Eagle Rock Chamber of Commerce. In 1939 the Commission asked the Chief of Police to please look into removing the possibly dangerous "coyotes, foxes, wildcats and mountain lions" of Griffith Park. Also that year, Van M. Griffith, whose parents Griffith J. Griffith and Tina (Mesmer) Griffith gave Griffith Park to the city, joined the Park Commission.

The Park Commission oversaw the Griffith Park Zoo within Griffith Park. For example, in 1938 the city council asked the Park Commission to investigate the feasibility of buying the Zoopark (formerly the Selig Zoo) collection of birds and animals for the Griffith Park Zoo. In 1941 the Commission approved the establishment of a "bird fountain" in Lafayette Park to be funded in honor of Mickey Bishop, "the famous Ambassador canary." Mickey Bishop was a literal canary, and the bird bath remained standing in the park until at least 1979. While Encino School was under construction in 1956, the Park Commission allowed lunchtime use of Encino Park as a play area.

== Governance ==
The five-person board of the current Recreation and Park Commission is responsible for departmental budget, staffing, contracting, leasing, purchasing and establishment of policies for Los Angeles city parks and recreation facilities.

== See also ==
- Casa de Castelar
- P-22
- City of Los Angeles Department of Recreation and Parks
