= Los Angeles Department of Parks and Recreation =

Los Angeles Department of Parks and Recreation may refer to:

- City of Los Angeles Department of Recreation and Parks
- Los Angeles County Department of Parks and Recreation
