= Play equity =

Play equity is the concept of ensuring all children have equitable access to play opportunities, sports programs and healthy movement. Youth sports, as well as structured and unstructured play, can contribute to the physical, emotional, social and academic development of young people. Play equity relates to the ongoing effort of providing opportunities and pathways to these benefits by removing barriers to access that can include economics, gender, ability, or where children reside.

This concept is predicated on the relationship between positive youth development and physical activity, commonly referred to in the United States as sports-based youth development. Play equity broadly encompasses the issue of a lack of access to resources – including facilities, trained coaches, organized programs and equipment – in underrepresented or lower-income communities.

== Origins ==
The term “play equity” was conceptualized and introduced by LA84 Foundation President & CEO Renata Simril, who proposed driving greater access to play for youth being confronted as a social justice issue.

Simril also set in motion an effort to address the disparities in access through collective impact by collaborating with government entities, pro sports teams, philanthropy, educational institutions, youth sports organizations and health providers to ensure children's access to play for their lifelong well-being.

The term play equity has since been adopted as part of growing movement to provide more youth with the opportunity to realize the benefits of sport and play for their future success and well-being, by organizations in youth sports, government, pro sports, the national media and others.

In the United Nations Rights of the Child, Article 31 declares that play is the right of all children. It recognizes "the right of the child to rest and leisure, to engage in play and recreational activities appropriate to the age of the child and to participate freely in cultural life and the arts."

== History ==
Youth ages 6-18 from low-income homes in the United States quit sports because of the financial costs at six times the rate of kids from high-income homes.

In the United States, participation studies find that kids from households that earn below $25,000 are five times less likely to participate in sports than children from more affluent homes. Black and Latino youth are twice as likely to reside in areas with subpar park space per capita. And 80 percent of young people, many in poor communities, do not meet federal guidelines for daily physical activity.

Advocates addressing youth sports and the barriers to access have witnessed the trend grow significantly over the last decade, with participation rates for healthy levels of activity for kids continuing to fall.

Part of the rise of the gap between children from less affluent households and those from families with higher incomes is the rise of youth sports as a lucrative industry while at the same time budget cuts and changing priorities at some public schools have also limited traditional physical education classes and school-based organized sports.

In this environment where schools have been forced to defund sports enrichment programs, profits for the youth sports industry in the United States have been projected to reach $77.6 billion by 2026, Many parents cannot afford private team registrations, travel, apparel, equipment and other expenses related to sports participation.

== Work and applications ==
Those working to achieve play equity broadly seek to eliminate the barriers to participation in quality youth sports, play and healthy movement experiences by kids in low-income communities, so every child, regardless of their social or economic circumstances, or their ability, have access to a positive youth sports experience.

An initial step was the LA84 Foundation establishing the Play Equity Fund, a 501(c)(3) public charity, in 2014 with the mission to address the growing inequities in youth sport, to drive social change and create more collaboration regionally and nationally.

In 2020 following the murder of George Floyd, the Play Equity Fund created a partnership with 11 pro sports teams in Los Angeles and Orange County, titled the Alliance, where the teams merged their resources in a five-year effort to aid underserved Black and Latino children through sports. In 2023, Angel City Football Club began playing as an NWSL club in Los Angeles and joined the Alliance to bring the collaboration to 12 teams in Southern California.

This model of pro sports organizations supporting play equity was followed in Seattle in 2023 with the Seattle Alliance For Play Equity.

In 2022, the Play Equity Fund and Nike partnered to address play equity for girls in the communities of Boyle Heights and Watts. By 2023, the partnership had supported 1,000 girls, trained 130 coaches and awarded $770,000 in grants to 13 partner organizations in Boyle Heights and Watts.

The King County Play Equity Coalition was established in Seattle, a network of organizations dedicated to challenging systems to center physical activity as a key part of health and youth development. Milwaukee has established a play equity-based model for their fields and neighborhood sports facilities.

The Philadelphia Youth Sports Collaborative also uses a play equity model to bring all children high-quality, sports-based youth development programs in schools and neighborhoods.
