= St. Mary's Episcopal School =

Girls school in Memphis, Tennessee, US

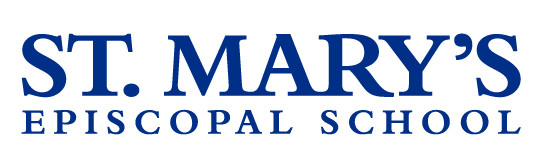

Location
- 60 Perkins Ext; Memphis, Tennessee 38117; United States; 35.1300°N 89.9078°W

Information
- Type: Private, day, college-prep
- Religious affiliation: Episcopal Church
- Established: 1847; 179 years ago
- Sister school: (Early Childhood-Middle School) Presbyterian Day School (Middle School-Upper School) Memphis University School
- CEEB code: 431462
- Head of School: Albert L. Throckmorton
- Grades: Age 2–12th grade
- Gender: Girls
- Enrollment: 825 (2024-25)
- Student to teacher ratio: 10:1
- Colors: Bl ue and White
- Athletics conference: TSSAA
- Mascot: The Turkey
- Accreditation: SACS, SAIS
- Feeder schools: Grace-St. Luke's Episcopal School, Woodland Presbyterian School
- Feeder to: Itself
- Website: www.stmarysschool.org

St. Mary's Episcopal School (SMS) is a private, independent school for girls from age 2 through 12th grade, located in Memphis, Tennessee, United States. St Mary's is the oldest private school in Memphis, and has been described as being the oldest school for girls in the mid-south region.

== History ==
St. Mary’s Episcopal School was established in 1847 by Mary Foote Pope. It is the oldest private school in Memphis. The school, founded at Calvary Episcopal Church, changed locations many times, including to Hernando, Mississippi in 1862 until the end of the Civil War.

From 1910 to 1949, Helen Loomis guided St. Mary's through the Great Depression and the two world wars. From 1949 to 1958, Gilmore Lynn directed St. Mary's through a period of growth, to 400 students. In 1953, she moved St. Mary's to its current location at the intersection of Perkins and Walnut Grove in Memphis.

Nathaniel C. Hughes was headmaster of St. Mary’s from 1962 to 1973. During his tenure, St. Mary's graduated an increasingly high percentage of National Merit Scholars, incorporated as an independent Episcopal school, and became the first independent girls’ school in Memphis to integrate its student body. Mary McClintock Davis, dean of the upper school from 1964 to 1979, "stood with Nat Hughes (the headmaster) to allow persons of all colors to be admitted" to the school. This occurred at a time when many private schools were being formed to avoid integration into the public schools.

St. Mary's grew rapidly during the 1970s, with the upper school increasing from 107 to 250 students during Davis’s tenure. The school continued to have a diverse student body; in 2014, minorities represented a fifth of the student body. The school expanded physically with several large construction projects during the 2000s. In 2012 it upgraded its data, network and phone telecommunications systems to permit greater use of technology.

St. Mary's Episcopal School has been supported by the Bishops of the Dioceses of Tennessee and West Tennessee. The school has been associated with the Church of the Holy Communion since 1953. It has previously been associated with Calvary Episcopal Church, St. Mary's Cathedral, and Grace-St. Luke's Episcopal Church.

== Academics ==
St. Mary's is a college preparatory program. Girls can also participate in many extracurricular activities, including sports, mock trials, debate, theater, robotics, and recycling competitions. Another project by students involved recycling efforts.

== Administration ==
The head of the school is Albert Throckmorton.

== Divisions ==
- Shaw Early Childhood Center: St. Mary's Place (2-year-olds), Pre-Kindergarten, Junior Kindergarten, Senior Kindergarten
- Lower School: 1st–5th grade
- Middle School: 6th–8th grade
- Upper School: 9th–12th grade

== Athletics ==
St. Mary's is a member school of the Tennessee Secondary School Athletic Association. Middle and Upper School students can compete in soccer, cross country, golf, volleyball, basketball, bowling, dance, swimming, fencing, lacrosse, track and field, tennis, and trap shooting.

The mascot of St. Mary's is the Turkey, formerly the Southern Belle. In the spring semester of 2013, USA Today included the St. Mary's Turkey in its Best High School Mascot Contest. Online voting led Turkey to win first place in the state of Tennessee, followed by a first-place victory in the Southeast region. The regional win advanced Turkey to the national competition, where it placed fifth.

== Online School for Girls ==
St. Mary’s is a charter member of the Online School for Girls, an electronic setting offering advanced academic instruction for girls worldwide. The mission of OSG is to "provide an exceptional all-girls educational experience by connecting girls worldwide through relevant and engaging coursework in a dynamic online learning community." The Head of School at St. Mary's, Albert Throckmorton, serves as the vice- resident on the OSG Board of Trustees.

== Notable alumnae ==
- Andrea Armani (Class of 1996), professor of Engineering
- Gwen Robinson Awsumb (Class of 1932), first woman elected to Memphis City Council
- Lee McGeorge Durrell (Class of 1967), naturalist, author, zookeeper and television presenter
- Crissy Garrett Haslam (Class of 1976), wife of Bill Haslam, governor of Tennessee
- Nora W. Tyson (Class of 1975), United States Navy vice admiral
- Windland Smith Rice (Class of 1988), photographer
- Arabella Page Rodman (Class of 1885), civic leader
- Gabrielle Rose (Class of 1995), competitive swimmer in the 1996 and 2000 Summer Olympics
