= Mesmer family of California =

Early Los Angeles settlers and developers

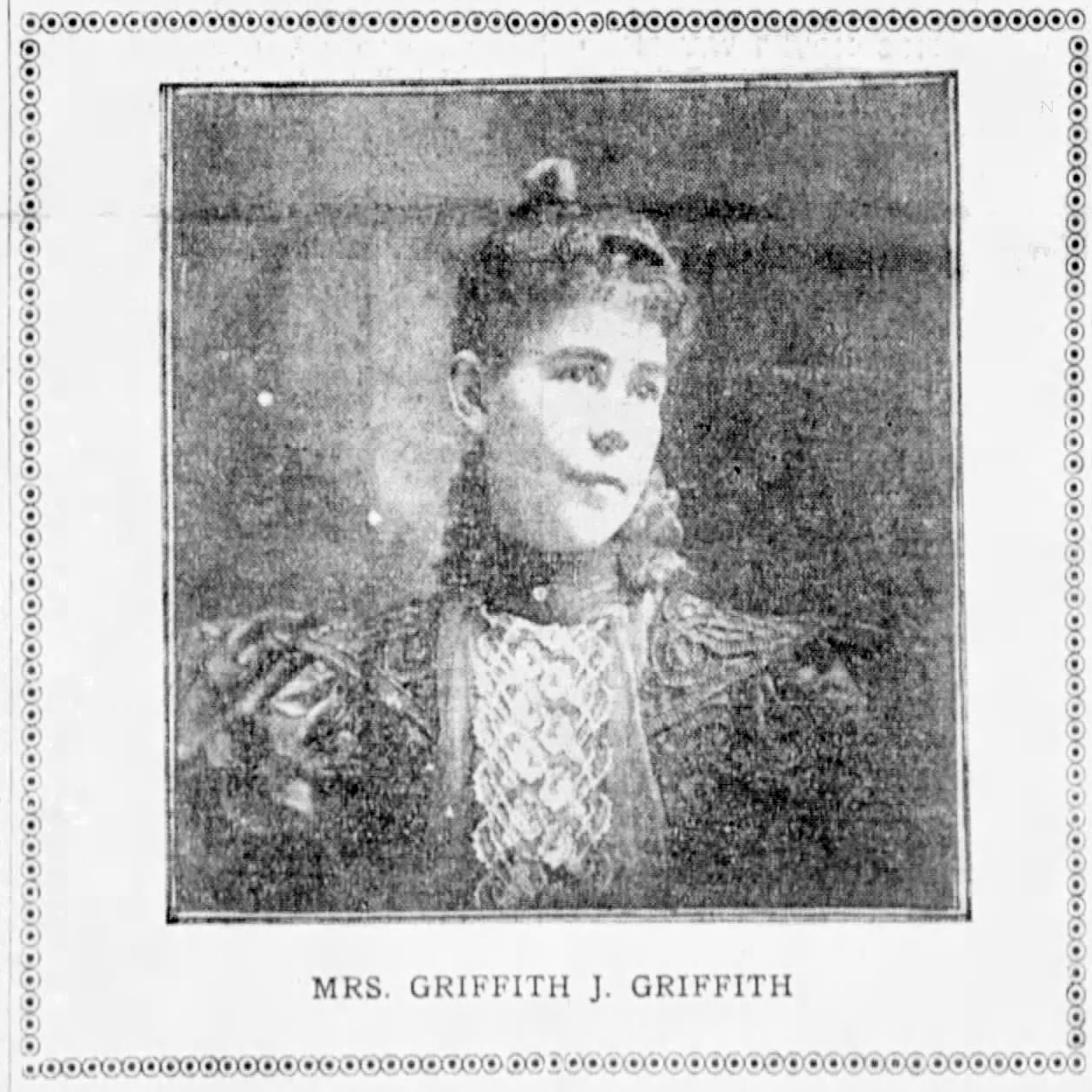
Mary Agnes Christina "Tina" Mesmer Griffith

The Mesmer family of California was a wealthy family of early Los Angeles settlers who contributed to the development of the city between the rancho era and the explosive growth of the post-WWII era.

== Louis Mesmer ==
Louis Aloise Moessmer Mesmer (February 20, 1829 – August 18, 1900) was, in his day, “considered in the front rank of the leaders of the city.”

Originally from Alsace, a region of eastern France with strong German cultural influence, Mesmer was trained as a bread baker. He initially worked in Ohio and then along the Fraser River in British Columbia, where he tried his hand at mining and then baked for the Hudson Bay Company. Mesmer immigrated to California in 1859, when the population of Los Angeles was fewer than 3,500 people. He had $20,000 in savings and used it to buy a bakery on Main Street, which he ran for two years. In those days he was apparently the only local producer of matzah, “which he sold to nearly all the Jewish families of Southern California.”

He sold the bakery and bought the United States Hotel in 1862, greatly expanding the building over time and operating a wholesale wine and liquor storefront on the ground floor. The United States Hotel was "the third hotel built in the city" but was rebuilt from scratch in 1886. In the early 20th century it was described by a historian as being "redolent of the romance of old Los Angeles." In 1887, the Los Angeles Times described it as "one of the best-known landmarks in Los Angeles…and practically the only hotel…Everybody knew Louis Mesmer…for that matter everyone knows him even now." (The hotel, which was managed by Mesmer’s son Tony, was sold by the family shortly after Mesmer’s death in 1900.)

After construction was halted due to funding issues, Louis Mesmer also oversaw the completion of St. Vibiana's Cathedral at the behest of Bishop Tadeo Amat and Bishop Mora. His son Joseph’s wedding there in 1879 to Rose Elizabeth Bushard was the “first marriage solemnized in the cathedral.”

The family home, which he purchased from “Mr. Hayes” in 1871, was on Fort Street between 1st and 2nd. The property later became the address 125 S. Broadway in the early 20th century downtown theater district.

According to his Los Angeles Herald obituary, “In 1880 he had put down the first regular cement squares sidewalk, for which he was arrested for an infringement of the Schlinger patent. As there were no federal courts south of San Francisco, he was arrested, taken by the United States marshal to San Francisco, and there the case was compromised. He broke the value of the patent, which inured to the public's benefit, but at a cost of over $800.”

In 1887, Mesmer, Moye Wicks and others were partners in the ultimately failed effort to build a harbor and settlement at Port Ballona, at what is now considered Playa Del Rey and the greater Ballona Wetlands complex.

According to another source (a landmark-status application for a building in Playa Del Rey), “Louis Mesmer had been an acquaintance of the Machado family…On February 23, 1890, Louis Mesmer inherited a significant percentage of the La Ballona Rancho from the estate of Andres Bristwalter, a Mesmer business partner and an acquaintance of the Machados. Louis Mesmer had purchased or obtained the balance of the Rancho La Ballona holdings through business dealings with Daniel Freeman and others.”

In 1893, Daniel Freeman and Louis Mesmer jointly requested a survey of the boundary between Rancho La Ballona and Rancho Sausal Redondo.

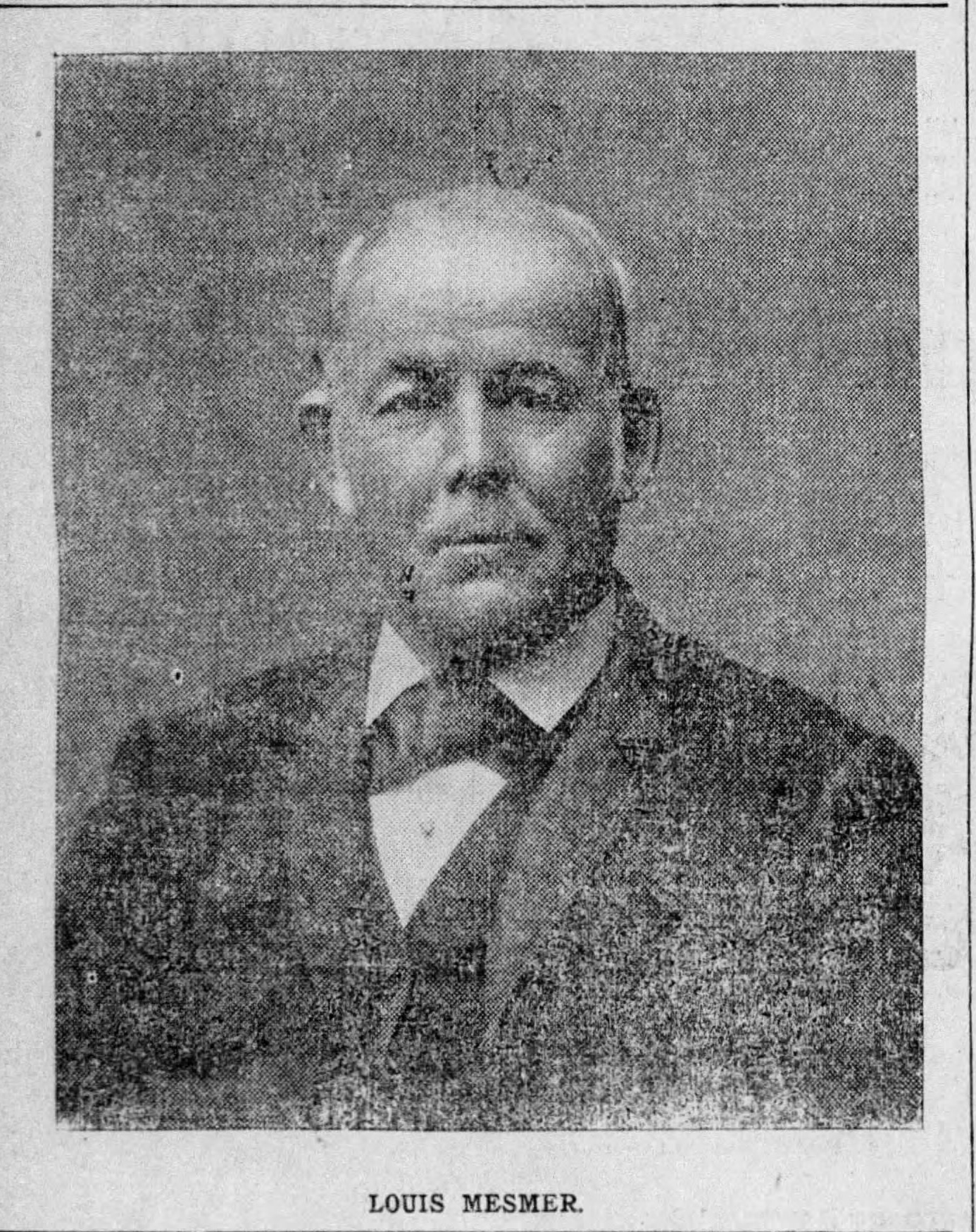
Louis Mesmer, Los Angeles Times obituary photo

Mesmer’s first wife, and mother of his children, was Catherine Forst (October 28, 1833 – October 2, 1891). His second wife, Jennie E. Swan, was many years his junior and their marriage by elopement triggered several weeks of breathless “scandal sheet” coverage in the Los Angeles Times. He was survived by his sons Joseph, Tony, and Alphonse, and his daughters Christina and Lucile; also a stepdaughter, Mrs. Ziba Patterson.

His estate was valued at $350,000 and was left in large part to Joseph Mesmer, with stipulations that the other heirs would only receive bequests if they did not contest the terms of the will. At the time of his death, Louis Mesmer owned “the Kraemer rancho” near Fullerton in Orange County, 766 acres (3.10 km^{2}) acres of the former Rancho La Ballona, 5 acres (20,000 m^{2}) acres at Port Ballona, “several lots in the Business Center tract,” the house on Broadway, a lot on Hill Street, and the U. S. Hotel.

== Joseph Mesmer ==
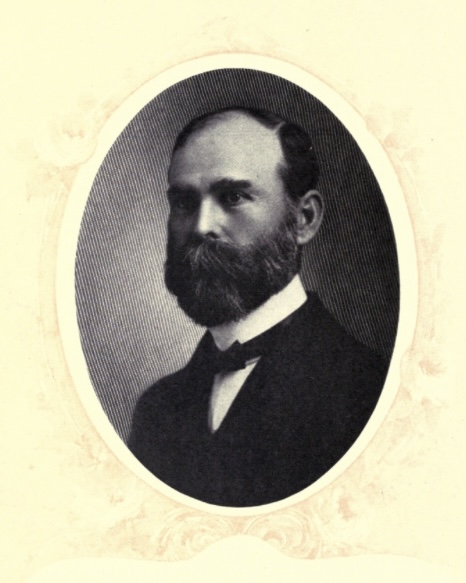
Portrait of Joseph Mesmer, circa 1906

Joseph Mesmer (November 3, 1855 – November 28, 1947) was an active, even profligate, civic booster of Los Angeles in his working lifetime. According to Whitewashed Adobe: The Rise of Los Angeles and the Remaking of Its Mexican Past (2004), “Mesmer is a little-studied but important figure in the history of land use and planning in Los Angeles.” He has been called the "Father of the Los Angeles Civic Center."

Mesmer’s obituary noted that he was a “great supporter of the Owens River project, the great aqueduct that brought water to a thirsty valley.” Described as a “one-man planning commission,” he was a member of the Los Angeles City Parks Commission (including one term as park commissioner), Los Angeles City Planning Commission, the Freeholders’ Charter Commission (to frame a new city charter), promoted the development of the Los Angeles Civic Center, and lobbied for decades for the creation of a Los Angeles Union Station. He was president of the North Los Angeles Development Company for 28 years.

As a 1921 biography put it “Mr. Mesmer for years has been a foremost advocate of development work in Southern California, particularly in Los Angeles city and county. Probably no citizen has been more liberal of his time and study in behalf of various plans and movements to beautify and improve the city.” He seems to have organized fundraising to buy the second federal courthouse and post office building (later replaced by the Spring Street Courthouse), the Temple Block that became the Los Angeles City Hall site, and the Los Angeles Chamber of Commerce building. He also was involved in expanding and extending several streets downtown and advocated for the “demolition and grading of Bunker Hill.” His main commercial interests were the Queen Boot and Shoe Store (which he operated from 1878 to 1906) and the St. Louis Fire and Brick Clay Company. Like his father before him, Mesmer was heavily involved in causes and charities of the Los Angeles Archdiocese.

In old age, he devoted himself to honoring the “pioneer” legacy of his father’s generation. He and his wife Rose Bushard Mesmer were married for 66 years; they died within a year of one another. The couple were parents to six children. Mesmer’s 12-year-old son Clarence drowned at “Ballona Harbor” in 1895 while visiting his grandfather Louis Mesmer. In 1902, the Beach Land Company bought the Port Ballona lands from Joseph Mesmer and began developing Playa Del Rey.

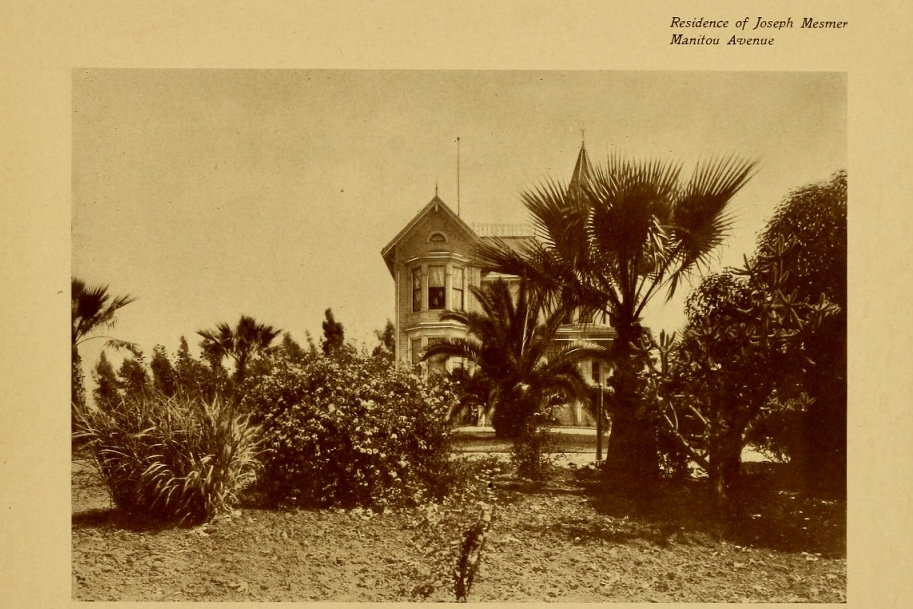
Residence of Joseph Mesmer on Manitou Avenue, from Los Angeles and Vicinity book created for the 1904 St. Louis World’s Fair

The crowning feature of his plans for a great and beautiful city proposes the improvement of the Los Angeles River bed. No other work, declares Mr. Mesmer, “could be projected that would have such beneficial results and mean so much to the city. It would transform the most unsightly feature of Los Angeles into a beautiful parkway, chain of lakes and esplanades such as would charm every beholder by the picture of a park six miles long in the center of the city. It would mean facilities immediately at hand for outing and recreation, walking over the serpentine paths amid shady trees and flowers. with facilities for boating and sailing in the six lakes each three thousand feet long, while the river bed and sides would be lined solidly with concrete and the parapet sidewalks above the surface level would be molded in artistic design, on the top of which would stand at every thirty feet a beautiful electrically lighted gondolier.

— From the Mountains to the Sea: Los Angeles (1921)

== Tina Mesmer Griffith ==
Mary Agnes Christina Mesmer Griffith (February 29, 1864 – August 11, 1948), called Tina, was the oldest daughter of Louis and Catherine Mesmer.

In 1887 she married Griffith J. Griffith, future namesake of Griffith Park.

While her parents and husband were wealthy, “Katarina Mesmer” was also heiress to a valuable piece of property at San Pedro and Washington that had been left to her by family friend Andres Briswalter. (Briswalter was an Alsatian like the Mesmers.) When Louis Mesmer died, the newspaper report about Mesmer’s Will stated, “Mrs. Mary Christina Griffith (wife of G. J. Griffith), another daughter, is left only $500. The testator explains that the reason of the bequest being so small was that, prior to his death, he had secured for his daughter a handsome bequest which would have come to him from the estate of the late Andre Briswalter.”

After 16 years of marriage, on Friday, September 4, 1903, at the Hotel Arcadia in Santa Monica, apparently motivated by a combination of chronic alcohol abuse, paranoia, religious bias, and sheer greed, Griffith shot Tina in the face. She miraculously survived but lost an eye and was permanently disfigured; he was sent to San Quentin Prison for less than two years. The couple divorced. Their only child was Van Griffith. After the end of her abusive marriage, Tina Mesmer lived out her days in virtual seclusion at the home of her younger sister Lucy Mesmer Whipple.

== Van Griffith ==
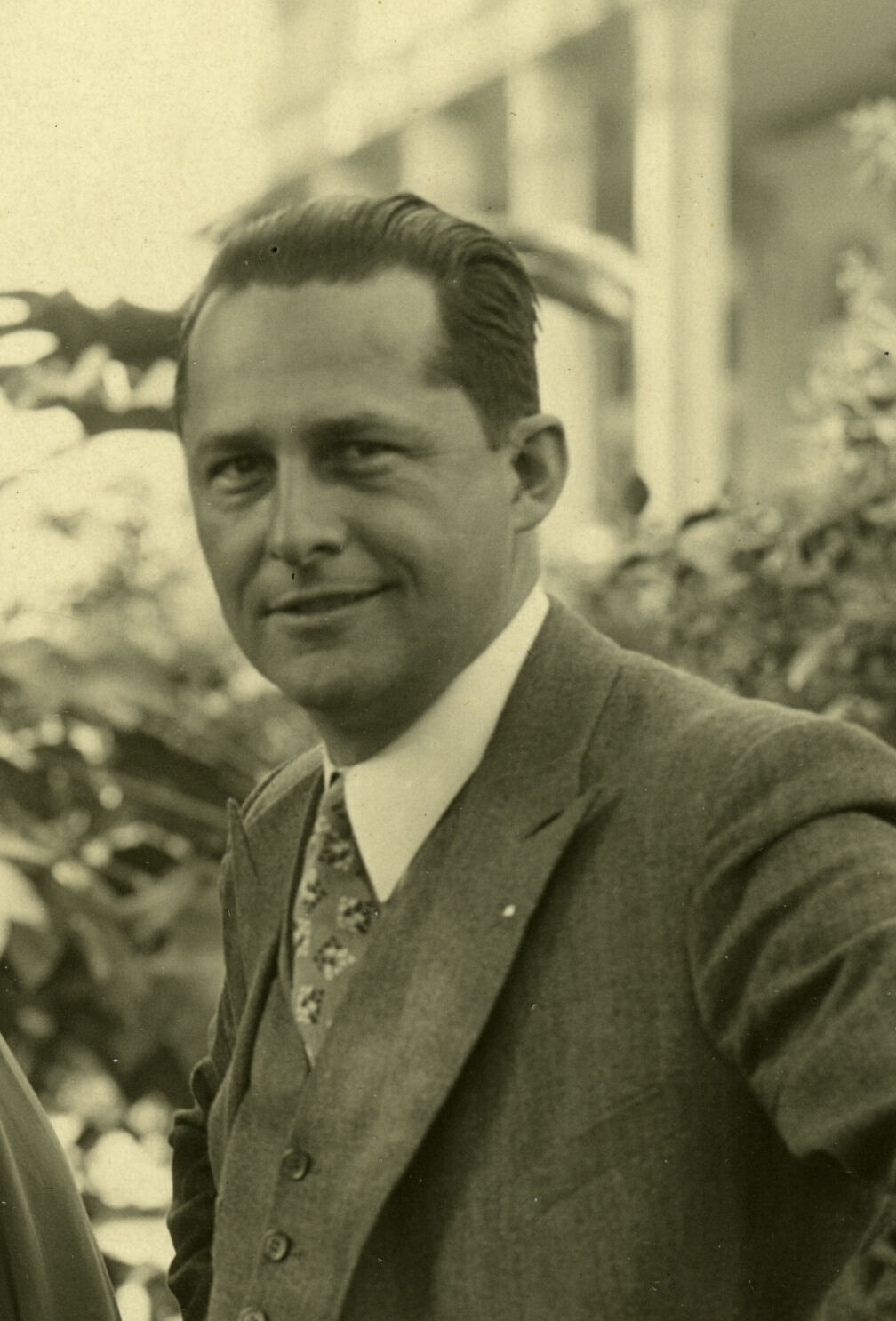
Van M. Griffith, portrait, c. 1925

Vandell Mowry Griffith (August 29, 1888 – July 14, 1974), known as Van Griffith, attended Stanford University and later became a Los Angeles Police Commissioner.

A 1951 LAPD exposé described Griffith as "a millionaire and a dead honest man", as well as a supporter of Mayor Fletcher Bowron.

== Mesmer placename ==
The Mesmer-owned Ballona lands were primarily used for cattle ranching. When the Southern California Railway line was created in 1887, one of the stops, Mesmer Station, was named Mesmer after the family. Local historian the Militant Angeleno argues that neighboring stop, Alsace (now the name of a tiny wedge of unincorporated Los Angeles County) was derived from Louis Mesmer’s homeland of Alsace in Europe. A street named Mesmer Avenue runs from the site of the old railway stop up to Ballona Creek near Inglewood Boulevard, which is one of the older roadways and bridge crossing in the era (dating to at least the late rancho era).

The intersection of Mesmer Avenue and Jefferson Boulevard is now a bus layover stop for five area transit routes.

Mesmer location in west Los Angeles
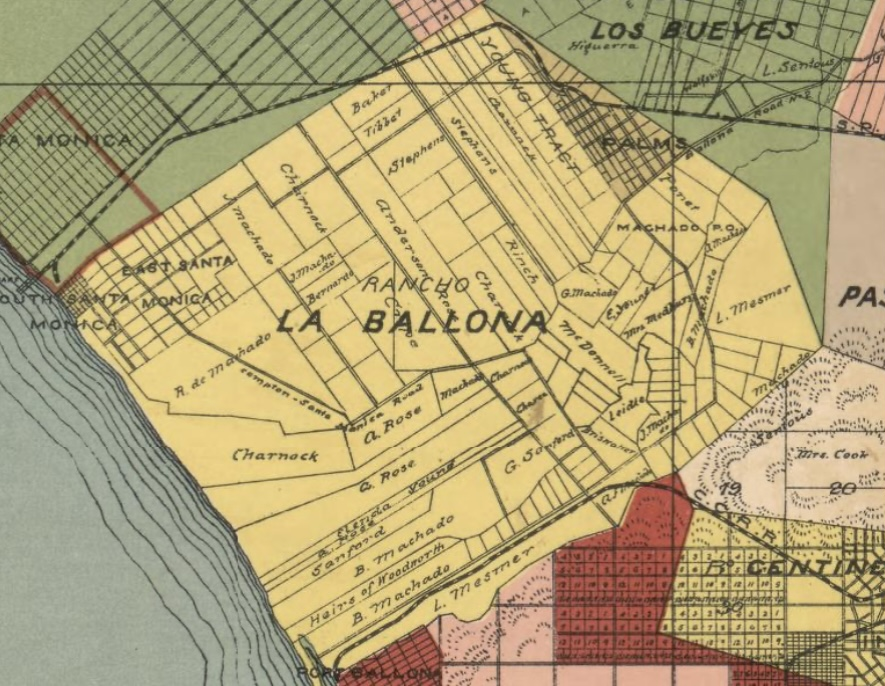
Mesmer (and Briswalter) holdings on the Ballona in 1888

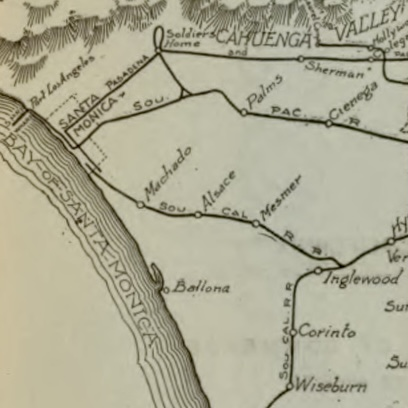
Machado, Alsace, and Mesmer stations in the 1890s

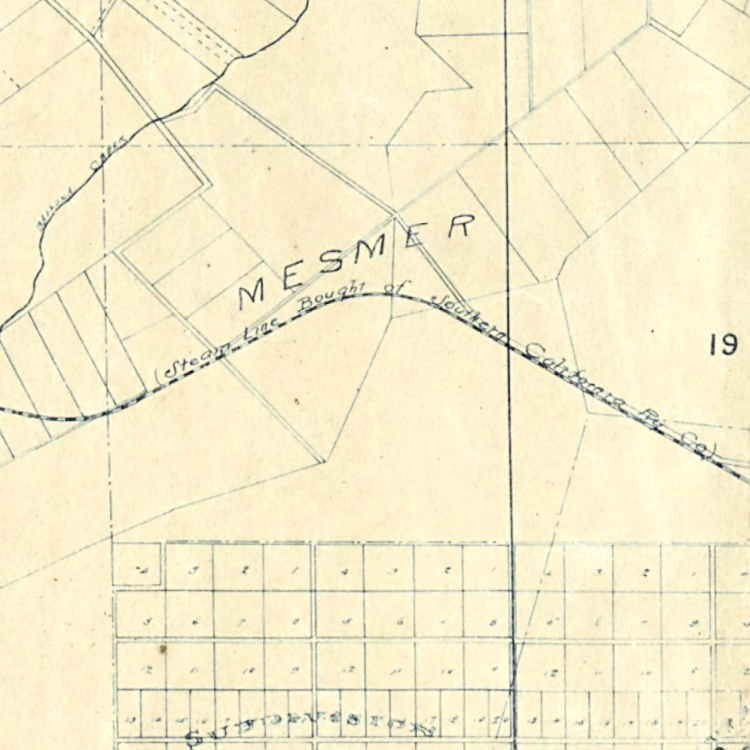
Mesmer placename along California Railway track that became Venice–Inglewood Line (map circa 1900)

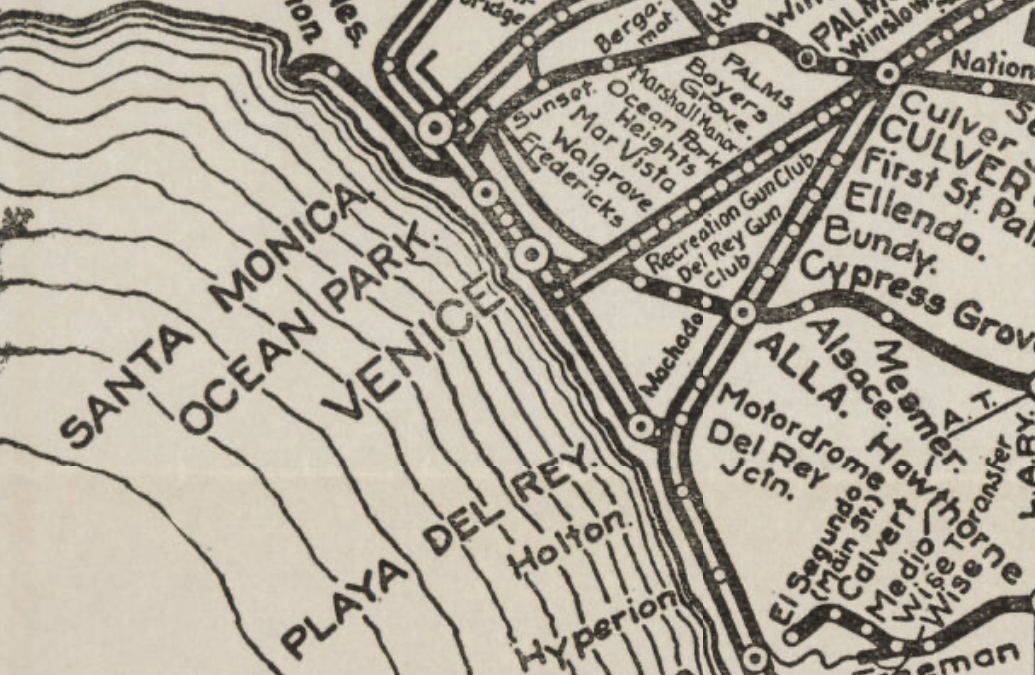
Mesmer station visible on Pacific Electric streetcar map; Del Rey Junction is the old Port Ballona stop

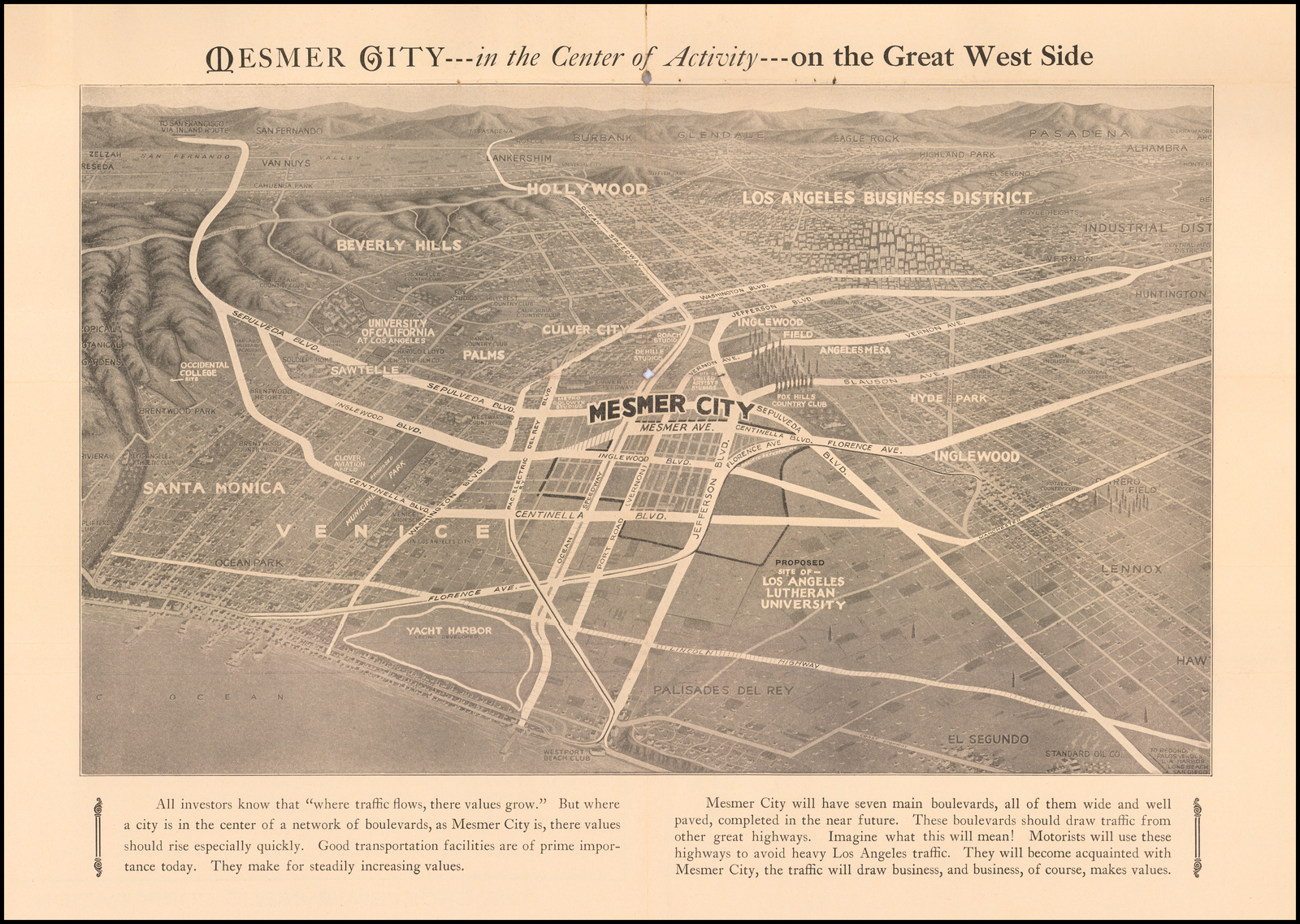
Mesmer City was laid out and marketed in 1924 but never developed.

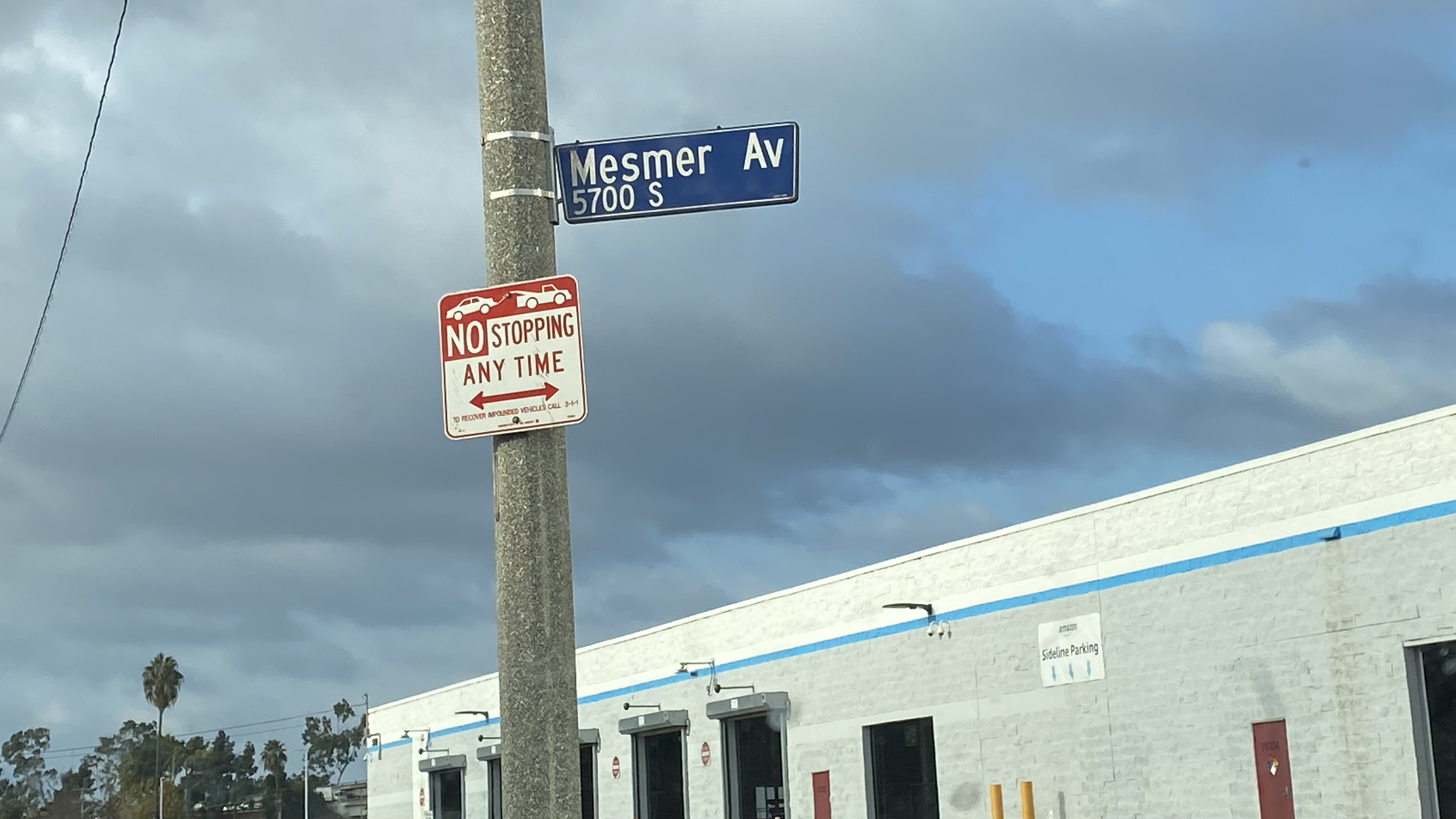
Mesmer Avenue sign at Centinela Avenue, near site of old Mesmer rail stop

== See also ==
- Sepúlveda family of California
- Bixby family of California
