= Gwen Robinson Awsumb =

American politician in Memphis, Tennessee

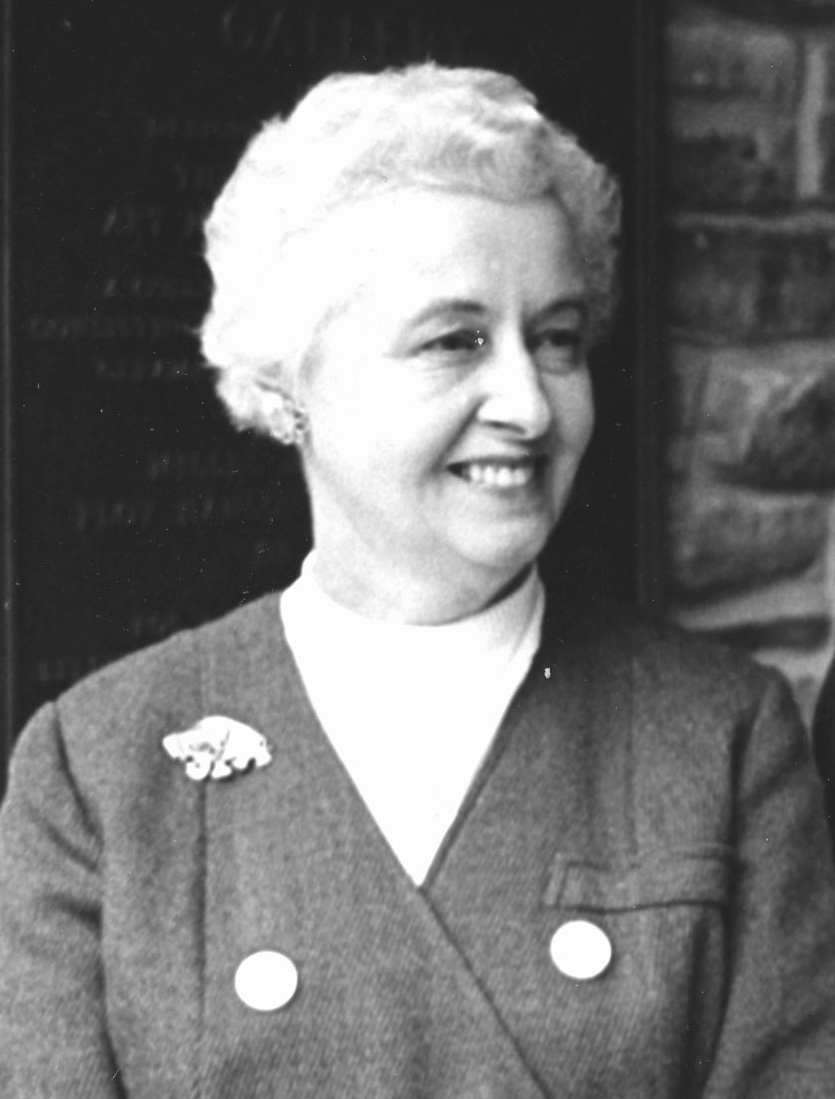
- Gwen Robinson Awsumb

Memphis City Council
- In office 1968–1975
- Constituency: District 2; At-Large

Personal details
- Born: Gwendolyn Van Court Robinson; September 25, 1915 Marshall, Michigan, U.S.
- Died: January 16, 2003 (aged 87) Memphis, Tennessee, U.S.
- Party: Republican
- Spouse: George Wells Awsumb
- Children: 3
- Education: Rhodes College

Gwen Robinson Awsumb (25 September 1915 – 16 January 2003) was an American politician and social activist. In 1967, she became the first woman to be elected to the city council in Memphis, Tennessee, United States. Her legacy is of challenging “political, social, and racial obstacles with her status as a white, female Republican” in the South. During the Memphis sanitation strike in 1968 she became a prominent local figure.

== Early life and education ==
Gwendolyn Van Court Robinson was born on September 25, 1915, in Marshall, Michigan to parents Catherine VanCourt (Pritchartt) Robinson and Carl Arnold Robinson. Her father was a lawyer and served as a Democrat in the Michigan state legislature for 15 years. The family moved to Chicago and then to North Florida during the depths of the Great Depression, before settling in Memphis in 1930 when she was at the age of 15. She graduated from St. Mary's Episcopal School in 1932, but was initially unable to attend college due to the family's financial difficulties. She eventually studied chemistry at Southwestern College (later renamed Rhodes College) and obtained a degree in 1937.

== Political career ==
Awsumb's interest in politics stemmed from her father's career in Michigan. In 1956, she ran a failed campaign as a Republican candidate for the Tennessee General Assembly.

In 1967, Awsumb became the first woman to be elected to the Memphis City Council. After two months into her first term, Awsumb became a prominent figure in the Memphis sanitation strike in 1968. Awsumb had the unenviable position as the council's liaison to Mayor Henry Loeb, who she accused of impeding the council's progress on resolving the strike. Awsumb did not support municipal labor unions in concept and opposed the strike. However, she understood that the strike exacerbated economic inequality for black Americans and she sought compromise in resolving it, such as an immediate wage raise, with her views shifting further to the strikers as police brutality escalated throughout the crisis.

The council elected her as chair in 1970—a position she held until 1975. In addition to the sanitation strike, her tumultuous tenure on the council also featured the assassination of Martin Luther King Jr., tension over racial integration of the city, and increasing participation of women in politics. Awsumb accepted an appointment as the first director of the city's Housing and Community Development in 1975, and served in the position until 1981.

Reflecting on her political career, she described herself as a “middle of the roader” who represented all people, and she was proud that she won majorities of all electoral precincts—including those in predominately white and black locations of the town.

== Personal life ==
Gwen Robinson married Wells Awsumb, son of the prominent Norwegian-American architect George Awsumb, in 1937. They had three children together, George, Carl, and Helen Catherine. Gwen Awsumb died in Memphis, Tennessee on January 16, 2003.

== Legacy ==
A feature column in The Daily Memphian celebrating the city's bicentennial included Awsumb in its list of 200 key historical figures that "you don't know but should." St. Mary's Episcopal School named her a recipient of its Distinguished Alumnae Award in 1996. A collection of her papers and historic records are preserved in the Memphis Public Library, declaring that she left behind "a legacy of awsumbness" in Memphis. After her death in 2003, the Tennessee General Assembly passed a resolution honoring her contributions to the city of Memphis and tenure as a council member and chair.

== See also ==
- Civil rights movement
- History of Memphis, Tennessee
- Women in positions of power
