= Anne Byrn =

American cookbook author

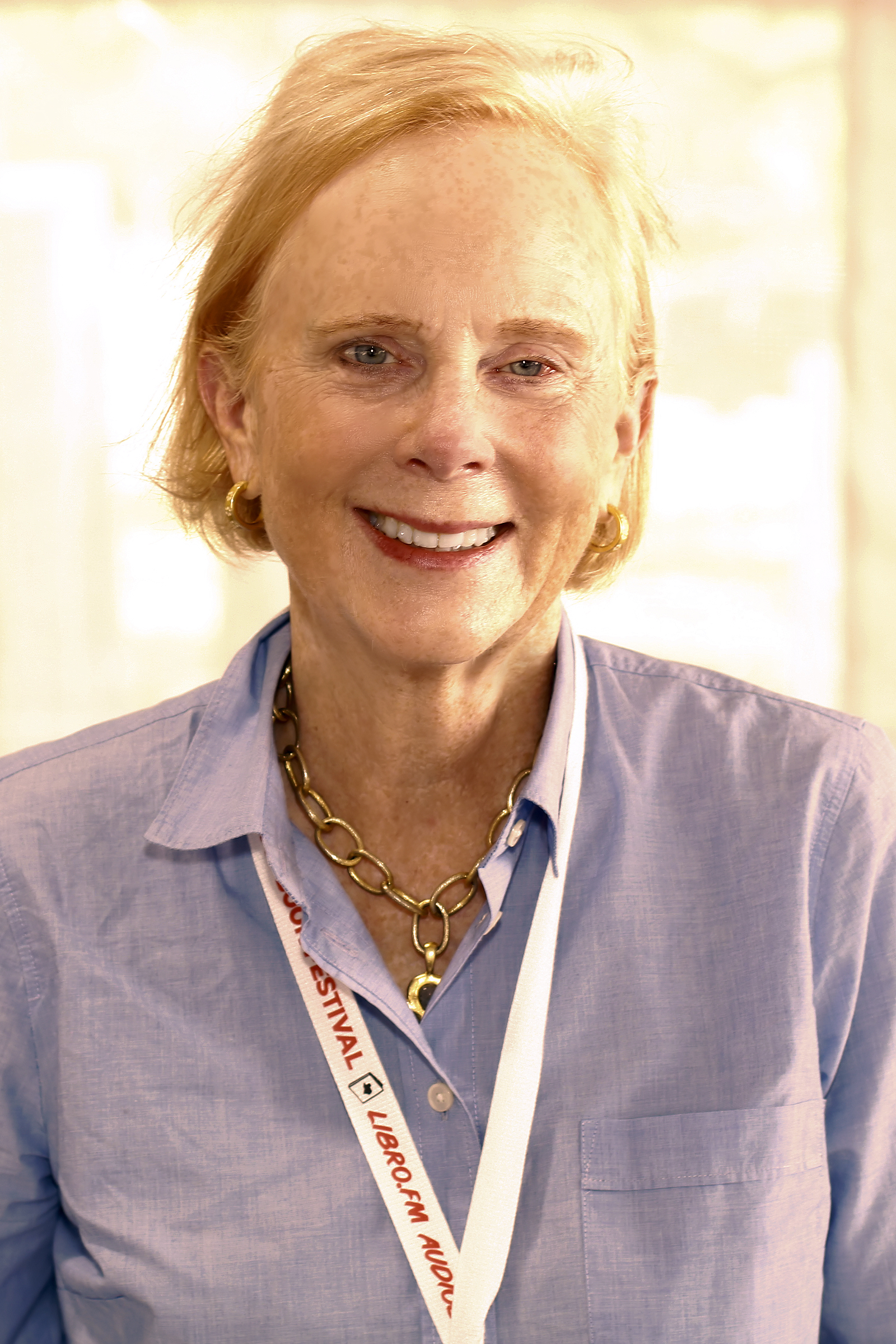
- Byrn at the 2024 Texas Book Festival.
- Born: Nashville, Tennessee
- Education: University of Georgia
- Culinary career
- Cooking style: Southern cuisine
- Website: AnneByrn.com

Anne Byrn is an American cookbook author and the former food editor of The Atlanta Journal-Constitution and The Tennessean.

== Biography ==
Byrn is a fifth-generation Tennessean. She graduated from Harpeth Hall School in Nashville in 1974 and the University of Georgia with a degree in journalism in 1978, and is a member of Alpha Omicron Pi Women's Fraternity at Georgia. She spent 15 years as the food editor of the Atlanta Journal-Constitution. Later, she studied cooking at La Varenne Ecole de Cuisine in Paris. Byrn also received instruction from Julia Child, Marcella Hazan and other chefs.

By 2013, Byrn had sold over 3.5 million copies of her cookbooks.

== Selected works ==
- The Cake Mix Doctor. Workman, 1999, ISBN 978-0761117193
- The Dinner Doctor. Workman, 2003, ISBN 978-0761126805
- Cupcakes!: From the Cake Mix Doctor. Workman, 2005, ISBN 978-0761138198
- What Can I Bring? Cookbook (Cake Mix Doctor). Workman, 2007, ISBN 978-0761143925
- The Cake Mix Doctor Returns!: With 160 All-New Recipes. Workman, 2009, ISBN 978-0761129615
- The Cake Mix Doctor Bakes Gluten-Free. Workman, 2010, ISBN 978-0761160984
- Anne Byrn Saves the Day! Cookbook: 125 Guaranteed-to-Please, Go-To Recipes to Rescue Any Occasion. Workman, 2014, ISBN 978-0761176107
