= Online School for Girls =

American online learning environment

Information
- Established: 2009; 17 years ago
- Gender: Girls

The Online School for Girls (OSG) is a US online learning environment built on the traditions of independent schools and girls' schools. It was founded in 2009 by four such schools forming a non-profit consortium.

== Consortium schools ==
The member schools are:

- Atlanta Girls' School, in Atlanta, Georgia
- The Ellis School, Pittsburgh, Pennsylvania
- **Harpeth Hall School**, Nashville, Tennessee
- **Holton-Arms School**, Bethesda, Maryland
- Hockaday School, Dallas, Texas
- **Laurel School**, Cleveland, Ohio
- Marlborough School, Los Angeles, California
- Miss Porter's School, Farmington, Connecticut
- School of the Holy Child, Rye, New York
- St. Mary's Episcopal School, Memphis, Tennessee
- St. Paul's School for Girls, Baltimore, Maryland
- **Westover School**, Middlebury, Connecticut

Those in bold are the founding members.

There are also a larger number of affiliated schools.
