= Harpeth Hall School =

Prep school in Nashville, Tennessee, US

Location
- 3801 Hobbs Road, Green Hills; Nashville, Tennessee 37215; United States; 36°6′3.07″N 86°50′24.79″W

Information
- Former name: Ward Belmont Seminary
- Type: Private, college-preparatory school
- Motto: Latin: Mentem spiritumque tollamus (Let us lift up the mind and spirit)
- Established: 1951 (Ward Seminary: 1865)
- Sister school: Montgomery Bell Academy
- NCES School ID: 01296378
- Head of school: Jess Hill
- Teaching staff: 81.6 (on an FTE basis)
- Grades: 5–12
- Gender: Girls
- Enrollment: 720 (2026–2027)
- Student to teacher ratio: 8.4
- Campus size: 44 acres (18 ha)
- Campus type: Suburban
- Colors: Magnolia green and silver gray
- Mascot: Honeybear & Bear
- Newspaper: Logos
- Yearbook: Milestones
- Website: www.harpethhall.org

Harpeth Hall School is a private, college-preparatory school for girls in the Green Hills neighborhood of Nashville, Tennessee, United States. Its beginning dates back to 1865 as a seminary for young ladies. After various mergers and name changes, the antecedent school closed in 1951, leading to the founding of the present school. The campus consists of a middle school and high school on a 40-acre (16 ha) site.

== History ==
With the scheduled closing of Nashville's Ward-Belmont College's high school pending about 1950, a group of concerned citizens organized to ensure that a college-preparatory school for girls would continue in the city. This group purchased a 26-acre tract of land known as the P.M. Estes estate in southwest Nashville at the corner of Estes Road and Hobbs Road. One of the building committee members, Mary Elizabeth Cayce, suggested the name of the new school be "Harpeth Hall", because of the proximity to the Harpeth River and that the words sounded "euphonius"

In the fall of 1951, the Ward-Belmont college-preparatory division reopened on a new campus and with a new name—the Harpeth Hall School. Harpeth Hall began the new school term with 161 students in grades 9 through 12, almost all of whom had transferred from Ward-Belmont. A Nashville historical marker at the 3801 Hobbs Road site commemorates the event. The first head of school, Mrs. Susan S. Souby, had previously headed the high school department at Ward-Belmont. The first administrators of Harpeth Hall and all but two members of the faculty were former members of the Ward-Belmont staff. The existing house on the newly acquired property served as Harpeth Hall's first school building, later named Souby Hall. Within the next year, the Southern Association of Colleges and Secondary Schools accredited the school. It rapidly gained membership in the National Association of Independent Schools, the Southern Association of Independent Schools, and the Mid-South Association of Independent Schools.

During Harpeth Hall's first decade, the facilities were expanded to include additional classroom space, an auditorium, gymnasium and cafeteria. In 1968, under the leadership of school head Idanelle McMurry, the Daugh W. Smith Middle School opened.

In 1998, a strategic plan was developed to address future faculty, program and facility needs. In 2000, a five-year, $42 million capital campaign entitled the "Campaign for Harpeth Hall" was launched to address these needs. By 2005, significant improvements to facilities were completed including a new library, a track and soccer complex, a visual arts center, and a middle school. In addition, the following facilities were renovated: the Jack C. Massey Center for Mathematics and Science, George N. Bullard Gymnasium, Frances Bond Davis Theatre, Marnie Sheridan Gallery, and Souby Hall. In 2007, the Hortense Bigelow Ingram Upper School completed major renovations on multiple buildings. A new Athletic and Wellness Center was completed in 2014.

== Diversity ==
When Nashville public schools were desegregated in September 1970, it was a time of turbulence in public education, for fear of the uncertain effects of court-ordered busing of students to achieve racial balance. Thirteen of Nashville's established private schools, including Harpeth Hall, saw an increase in enrollment after the court decision. The IRS was ordered to deny tax-exempt status of any private school with a racially discriminatory admissions policy, but found no such discrimination even though many private schools had no black students. MBA headmaster Francis E. Carter told The Tennessean that black students were welcome, but that none had ever applied, which was typical of private schools in Nashville. Harpeth Hall developed an active program to increase diversity in its student body. In 1979, Harpeth Hall's first black student was Cezanne Gray, who stated, "I like breaking barriers and being the first". In 2015, ethnic and racial minority students comprised 13% of the student body; as of 2018, 16% of the student body received need-based financial grants. According to the school's website, for the school year of 2020–2021 the average per aid grant is $18,568.

== Campus facilities ==
Harpeth Hall School is located in the residential Green Hills neighborhood of Nashville. The nucleus of the campus is Souby Hall, which is the administration building and is the original structure present when the land was purchased. Souby Hall has been extensively remodeled, but retains its original classic facade. As of 2016, there are 11 additional buildings including the upper school complex, a middle school, a library, a gymnasium, a theater, a gallery, a mathematics and science center, a visual arts center, a center for arts and athletics, a track and soccer complex, and an athletic and wellness center. The school has a field house, an eight lane track and two softball fields. In 2007, the school installed AstroTurf, a synthetic playing surface which is used for soccer and lacrosse, a first for a girls school in Tennessee.

In 2000, Harpeth Hall introduced a "laptop initiative" into the curriculum, creating a 1:1 student-to-computer ratio. Each student is given a laptop computer which is provided on a lease and maintained by the school's technology department. A campus network links students and teachers for projects, homework and assignments.

Harpeth Hall collaborates with Montgomery Bell Academy, a school for boys located nearby. Both schools have a strong tradition of single-gender education, but have agreed to participate in joint drama and music programs, community service projects, sharing of athletic field space, and transportation to athletic competitions.

== Academics ==
In 2009, Harpeth Hall became one of the founding members of the Online School for Girls, a program that allows students to take advanced placement classes not offered by their own school. Harpeth Hall students participated in the inaugural year of the Online School, taking classes in Multivariable Calculus, Differential Equations, Computer Programming and Genetics. Eventually the program will allow any girl to enroll in courses, whether she is in public school or home schooled.

In 2011, the school opened a "Center for STEM Education for Girls". The letters stand for "Science, Technology, Engineering and Math", subjects that have stereotypically belonged to boys. The purpose of this program is to increase the number of young women pursuing college degrees and careers in the STEM fields. The program is funded through an Edward E. Ford Foundation Leadership Grant and other donors.

Harpeth Hall has received the National Service-Learning School award. In 2011, the school created a strategic partnership with a rural village in Western Kenya's Lwala Province to support girls' education there and to provide service opportunities for Harpeth Hall students. An example is providing uniforms for sixth-grade African girls.

== Timeline ==
The following table is adapted and condensed from All-Girls Education from Ward Seminary to Harpeth Hall, 1865 to 2015.

Year	Event
1951	Ward-Belmont closes; Harpeth Hall founded
1951	Susan Souby is first head of school
1953	Bullard Gymnasium opens
1954	Original Wallace Educational Building opens
1964	Idanelle "Sam" McMurry becomes head of school
1966	Allison Library opens
1968	Middle School opens
1973	School uniforms adopted; Winterim program begins
1976	New theater, gallery and gymnasium completed
1980	David E. Wood becomes head of school
1985	Center for Mathematics and Science opened
1991	Leah Rhys becomes head of school
1991	Kirkman house becomes residence for school head
1997	Campus-wide internet network established
1998	Ann Teaff appointed head
2001	New library replaces existing library
2002	Laptop computers for every student
2003	Visual arts center opens; track and soccer complex opens
2004	Upper school renovated, renamed
2009	Harpeth Hall founder of Online School for Girls
2015	Stephanie Balmer becomes head of school
2018	Stephanie Balmer dies
2018	Jess Hill becomes head of school

== Notable alumnae ==
- Anne Byrn, cooking writer
- Tracy Caulkins, Olympic swimmer
- Amy Grant, singer, songwriter, musician, author and media personality
- Margaret Groos, Olympic runner
- Minnie Pearl, comedienne
- Mildred T. Stahlman, neonatologist
- V.E. Schwab, author
- Alexandra Walsh, Olympic swimmer
- Gretchen Walsh, Olympic swimmer
- Linden Wiesman, Olympic equestrian
- Reese Witherspoon, actress, producer, and entrepreneur
