= Arabella Page Rodman =

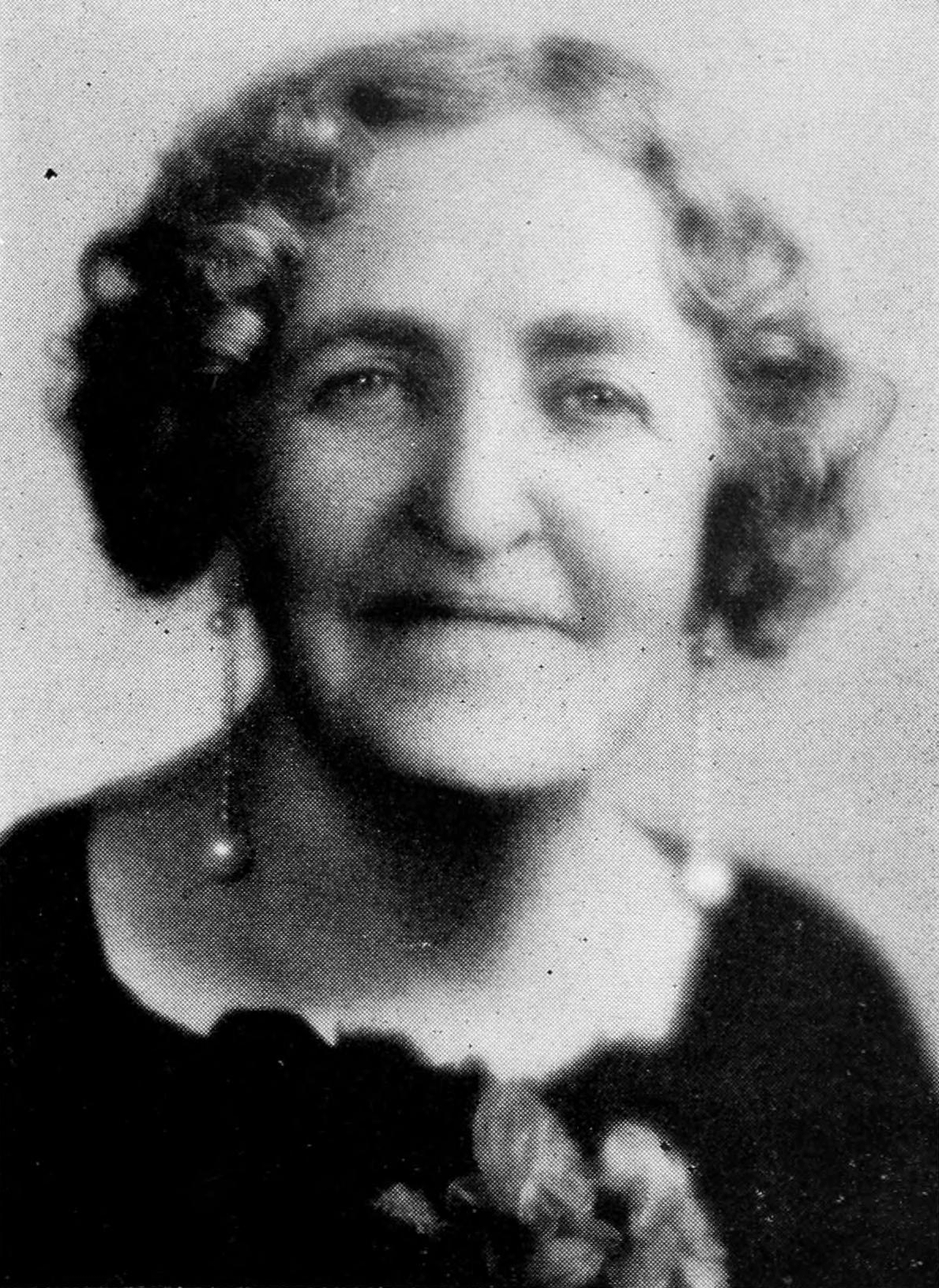
- Rodman c. 1940
- Born: Arabella Page; September 19, 1868; Memphis, Tennessee, U.S.
- Died: December 1955 (aged 87)
- Education: St. Mary's Episcopal School
- Occupations: Civic leader; author; philanthropist
- Known for: Playgrounds
- Notable work: Through Opening Doors
- Political party: Democratic
- Spouse: Willoughby Rodman (m. 1892)
- Children: 2
- Relatives: Thomas Nelson Page
- Awards: Red Cross decorations from France and Belgium

Arabella Page Rodman (née, Page; known after marriage as Mrs. Willoughby Rodman; 1868–1955) was an American civic leader, author, and philanthropist. Associated with organizations for the civic betterment of conditions for children and other public and semi-public philanthropic movements, she established the world's first playground commission in Los Angeles. She was one of the leading speakers on various phases of recreational, vocational, and other social agencies.

== Early life and education ==
Arabella Page was born in Memphis, Tennessee, September 19, 1868. Her parents were John Clifford Page and Ann Arabella Page. Both parents had the same family name but no blood relationship. They were cousins of Thomas Nelson Page, the author. Rodman was of Colonial and Revolutionary ancestry. Her grandfather, John Page from London, England, settled in Virginia. Rodman's father was president of the Jockey Club in Memphis.

She graduated from St. Mary's Episcopal School, Memphis, Tennessee, in June 1885.

== Career ==
Prior to the biennial meeting of the General Federation of Women's Clubs held in Los Angeles, California, in May 1902, Rodman's civic activity had been confined to work in connection with the public schools, she having been instrumental in causing the collection of a fund for the purchase of pictures and statues for school rooms. The result of this meeting was not only to stimulate general work among these clubs, but to suggest opportunities and methods for specific practical work. Soon after the convention, and as its direct result, the Out-Door Art League of the American Civic Association was organized. Of this, Rodman was a member from the start.

She was president of the Los Angeles Civic Association in 1904. She was for three years district chair of civics of the Federated Clubs, and later, California state chair.

She addressed many district and state conventions on civic subjects, and delivered lectures in numerous cities. Among the accomplishments to the credit of the Civic Association were:

- setting apart of Arbor Day, on which trees are planted in all parts of the city
- appointment of a City Forester, with authority over the planting, care and preservation of trees on city streets
- decoration and improvement of school rooms and school grounds
- appointment of a City Billboard Inspector

Rodman established playgrounds in Los Angeles and other California towns. Her greatest efforts were given to the establishment of city playgrounds in Los Angeles. She was President of the Playground Commission since its organization, and had direct supervision of its work. Eleven playgrounds were established and equipped with gymnasiums and apparatus for games, some of them having complete and elaborate outfits, with baths and dressing rooms. Some of them were branches of the Los Angeles Public Library. The immediate result of the public playgrounds was a great decrease in the number of juvenile arrests and the noticeable improvement in the general morale of Los Angeles youth.

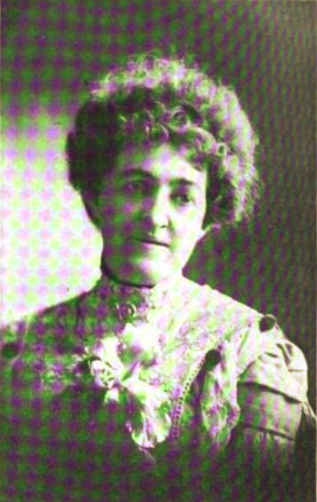
Rodman in a 1909 publication.

Rodman was a speaker for the Woman's Democratic Committee of Los Angeles. She served as a director in the Legal Aid Society, was a member of the Parents and Teachers' Association, and the Juvenile Court Association, and member of the Friday Morning Club and Sierra Club. She served as a member of the Board of Playgrounds and Recreational Association of America, and wrote articles on recreation for Playground Magazine. Rodman promoted the construction of the Los Angeles Memorial Coliseum as well as the founding of the Community Chest. She was the ideator of holding Olympic Games in Los Angeles.

Rodman made her first trip around the world in 1911, and subsequently, five others. She spent two years, 1922–24, in Europe, and was a popular lecturer on European conditions.

"You have done more for the good of your country in making friendly relations than any three commercial commissions." -Herbert Hoover

She was chair of the Committee of Southern California for Foreign Relief from 1914, and was active in many of the organized agencies growing out of World War I, including the Commission for Relief in Belgium and many of the committees handling war work. In 1919, Rodman sailed from San Francisco for India on the steamship Santa Cruz; it was a six months travel on account of her husband's health, with visits to Singapore, Saigon, and Calcutta. After her return in November, work would be immediately commenced in transferring the efforts of the Belgian Committee to relief of the suffering in Serbia and France.

In 1940, she was engaged in World War II war-relief work, organizing for the American Red Cross in her neighborhood district of Silver Lake, having moved there in 1937.

== Personal life ==
On August 3, 1892, she married Willoughby Rodman, a lawyer, and an author of a work on the history of the bench and bar of Southern California and articles for Encyclopedia of Law, essays and poems. The Rodmans had two sons, Thomas Clifford Rodman and Willoughby Page Rodman, both natives of Los Angeles.

Arabella Page Rodman died in December 1955.

== Awards and honors ==
She was conferred numerous medals and decorations, including Red Cross decorations from France and Belgium.

== Selected works ==
- Through Opening Doors, 1947
