= Andrea Armani =

American chemical engineer

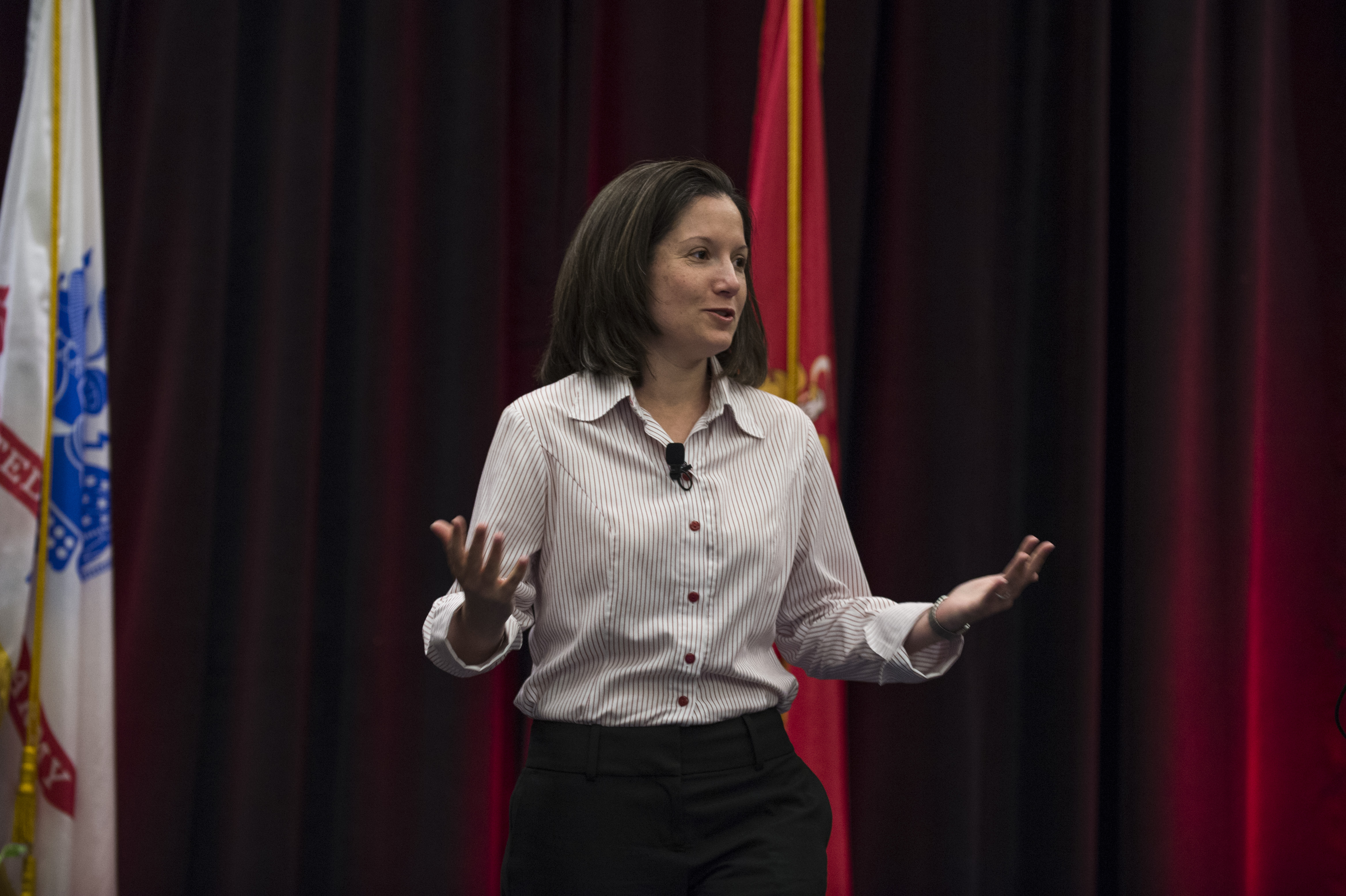
- Andrea Armani in 2017
- Education: California Institute of Technology; University of Chicago
- Awards: Fellow of the National Academy of Inventors (2021) Fellow of the American Association for the Advancement of Science (2021); World Economic Forum Young Global Leader (2015) PECASE (2010)
- Scientific career
- Workplaces: University of Southern California

Andrea Martin Armani is Sr Director of Engineering and Physical Sciences at the Ellison Institute of Technology, the Ray Irani Chair in Engineering and Materials Science, and a professor of chemical engineering and materials science at the USC Viterbi School of Engineering. She was awarded the 2010 Presidential Early Career Award for Scientists and Engineers from Barack Obama and is a World Economic Forum Young Global Leader.

Over the course of her career, Armani has made significant contributions to a wide range of fields, including surface chemistry, nonlinear materials, and linear and nonlinear integrated optical devices. Her findings have applications in everything from diagnostics to telecommunications. Her research group is highly interdisciplinary, working from the fundamentals of material discovery and optics to exploring the clinical and quantum applications.

== Early life and education ==
Armani is from Memphis, Tennessee. She attended St. Mary's Episcopal School and graduated in 1996. She was described by her school as being a "Renaissance woman", took part in Model United Nations and played the flute. She studied physics at the University of Chicago, graduating in 2001. She was the only girl in her physics class. She moved to the California Institute of Technology for her doctoral studies, majoring in applied physics with a minor in biology. From 2006 to 2008 Armani served as a Clare Boothe Luce postdoctoral researcher in biology and chemical engineering at Caltech. Her advisors were Scott E. Fraser and Richard Flagan. While there she worked on single-molecule detection, using a silica surface that is functionalised to bind a target molecule.

== Career and research ==
Armani began her faculty career at the University of Southern California in the Viterbi School of Engineering. When she was offered her position, she delivered a hand-written acceptance letter to Yannis C. Yortsos. She was the director of the W. M. Keck Photonics Cleanroom and John D. O'Brien Nanofabrication Laboratory overseeing its design, construction, and opening. From 2010 to 2017, she was the Fluor Early Career Chair of Engineering, and in 2017, she was appointed the Ray Irani Chair in Chemical Engineering and Materials Science. She has appointments in Chemical Engineering and Materials Science, Biomedical Engineering, Electrical Engineering, Mechanical Engineering, and Chemistry. From 2015 to 2019, she was a Faculty Fellow at Northrop Grumman, and in 2023, she joined the Ellison Institute of Technology as the Sr. Director of Engineering and Physical Sciences. In this role, she leads a team of scientists and engineers advancing biomedical technologies and agritech instrumentation for global impact.

Armani's first research experience, supported by an NSF REU, was in Prof. Heinrich Jaeger's lab studying the self-assembly of diblock co-polymer films. She completed her senior thesis with Prof. David Grier studying optical binding between particles using a linear optical trap. She presented these results at the spring APS March meeting in 2001, which was her first conference presentation.

Once she joined USC, Armani blended optics and chemistry. She used gold nanoparticles to create low power frequency combs, which can be used as high precision light sources in fields such as cybersecurity, chemical sensing and GPS. The gold nanoparticles increase the light that circulates in the device, allowing the microlaser to operate at a range of wavelengths at high intensity. She also works on hybrid organic-inorganic photonics which combine organic materials with conventional integrated photonic devices. In this work, she invented several new organic small molecules to improve optical device performance for Raman lasers, frequency comb generation, and frequency switchable devices. She invented a photo-responsive material and created a flexible indicator from a tri-layer polymer-based device, which changes colour when exposed to UV light. The colour change is due to the polymer irreversibly cleaving when exposed to UV-light. This device could be used in preventive healthcare to protect against skin cancer. She was supported by the Office of Naval Research to develop an interferometric optical biosensor. The proposed biosensor is able to detect DNA and bacteria. She developed a high-resolution polarimetric elastography instrument to characterise the mechanical properties of visco-elastic materials. This has been used to study the extracellular matrix in pancreatic tissue and porcine tissue and has potential in cancer diagnostics.

Armani is interested in using optical devices for epigenetic investigations, and has developed a label-free sensor that can detect and quantify DNA methylation. The sensor incorporates a rare-earth element optical cavity to form a nanolaser. The heterodyned nanolaser sensors can be used to diagnose ovarian cancer as they are sensitive to RASSF1A and BRCA1 promoters. They complement their experimental work with finite element method and finite-difference time-domain method modelling. In 2018 she announced a portable malaria screening device that can be used for rapid screening. The device uses a 633 nm laser to study hemozoin, a magnetic insoluble nanocrystal that forms when heme aggregates. The hemozoin nanoparticles strongly scatter light and can be moved using a magnet, which allows them to be identified by monitoring the intensity of light that passes through a sample.

Her team has also advanced imaging methods, developing new computational analysis techniques and new light-emitting materials. She created a ML-based algorithm that can assess the viability of 3D spheroids and organoids without requiring a dye or fluorescent molecule. She demonstrated that this method can perform longitudinal studies of the impact of cancer therapeutics on spheroids. She also designed and demonstrated a new fluorescent imaging agent that provides information about the spatial separation of HER2 proteins on the surface of cancer cells. This spatial information is not available using other methods, and it is thought to be a key factor in the efficacy of HER2-based therapeutics. She also made a multi-functional molecule that could allow reading and writing of neural activity over large spatial and temporal scales. During COVID19, her team leveraged their expertise in optics and their existing collaborations with the USC medical school to design and validate a UV-C decontamination system. Working with a manufacturing company in the LA-area, they built numerous systems and distributed them throughout the LA area, and they posted the schematics and a detailed parts list online. She also took a leadership role in the NAE "Call to Action" Initiative.

Her lab group are not only involved with research, but actively engaged with the community, running engineering festivals, lab parties and sports days. She is also a co-founder, alongside Orad Reshef, of the Photonics Online Meet-up (POM). Armani is a Fellow of SPIE, Optica (formerly OSA), AAAS, and NAI and was a visiting lecturer of both societies from 2009-2015. She was the faculty advisor for the student chapters of SPIE and Optica at USC. She also was an Associate Editor or Features Editor of Optics Letters from 2009-2023, and she is currently an Associate Editor of ACS Photonics.

== Awards and honors ==
Armani is a Fellow of the SPIE and Optica.

- 2022 Robert E. Hopkins Leadership Award
- 2021 Fellow of the American Association for the Advancement of Science
- 2021 Fellow of the National Academy of Inventors
- 2017 Sigma Xi member
- 2015 World Economic Forum Young Global Leader
- 2014 Popular Science Brilliant 10
- 2013 Grainger Foundation Frontiers of Engineering
- 2011 USC Viterbi Junior Research Award
- 2010 White House Presidential Early Career Award for Scientists and Engineers
- 2010 National Institutes of Health Director's New Innovator Award
- 2010 USC Mellon Mentoring Award for Undergraduates
- 2010 Congressionally Directed Medical Research Program Young Investigator Award
- 2009 MIT Technology Review TR 35 Top 35 Innovators under 35
- 2009 Office of Naval Research Young Investigator Award
- 2008 SPIE Young Investigator Award
- 2007 California Institute of Technology Graduate Dean's Award for Community Service
- 2001 Sigma Xi award for Excellence in Research
