= Hotel Arcadia =

Former hotel in Santa Monica, California

Coordinates: 34.0101°N 118.492°W

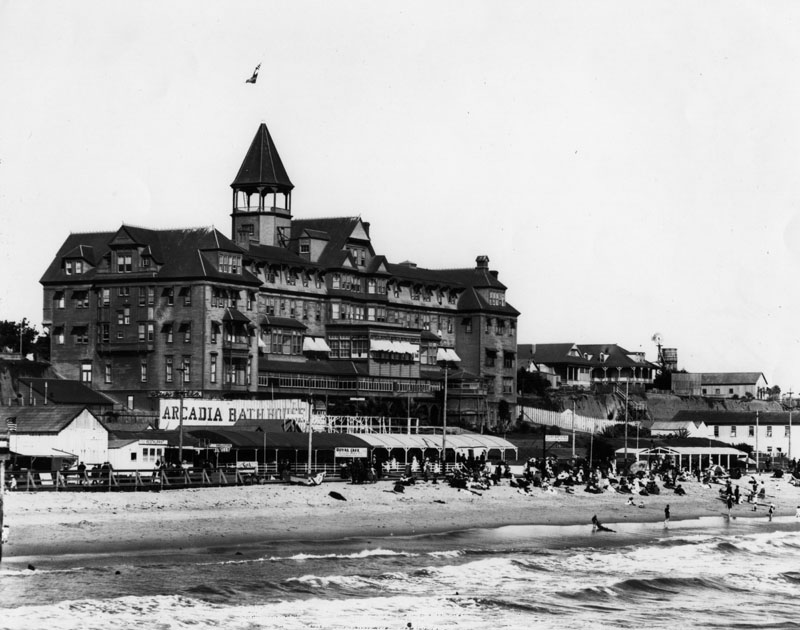
Hotel Arcadia, circa 1890

The Hotel Arcadia was a hotel in Santa Monica, California that stood on the oceanfront between 1886 and 1909. The hotel was located on Ocean Avenue between Colorado and Front (later Pico Boulevard).

Built during what one historian called the Great Boom, the “fashionable and luxurious” hotel attracted wealthy visitors to the climate and scenery of the area, which ultimately became “important factors in the upbuilding of Southern California.”

Named in honor of Arcadia Bandini de Stearns Baker, the five-story hotel built by Jesup W. Scott had “glass observatories” facing the beach. At the time of its completion it was considered the “finest seaside hotel” in the state, comparable only to the Del Monte in Monterey. A history of early Southern California resorts described it as a “summer society capitol.”

In 1903, Griffith J. Griffith shot his wife Tina Mesmer in a room at the Hotel Arcadia as she was packing for the return to Los Angeles after their month at the resort, which she had hoped would put her husband in better mind.

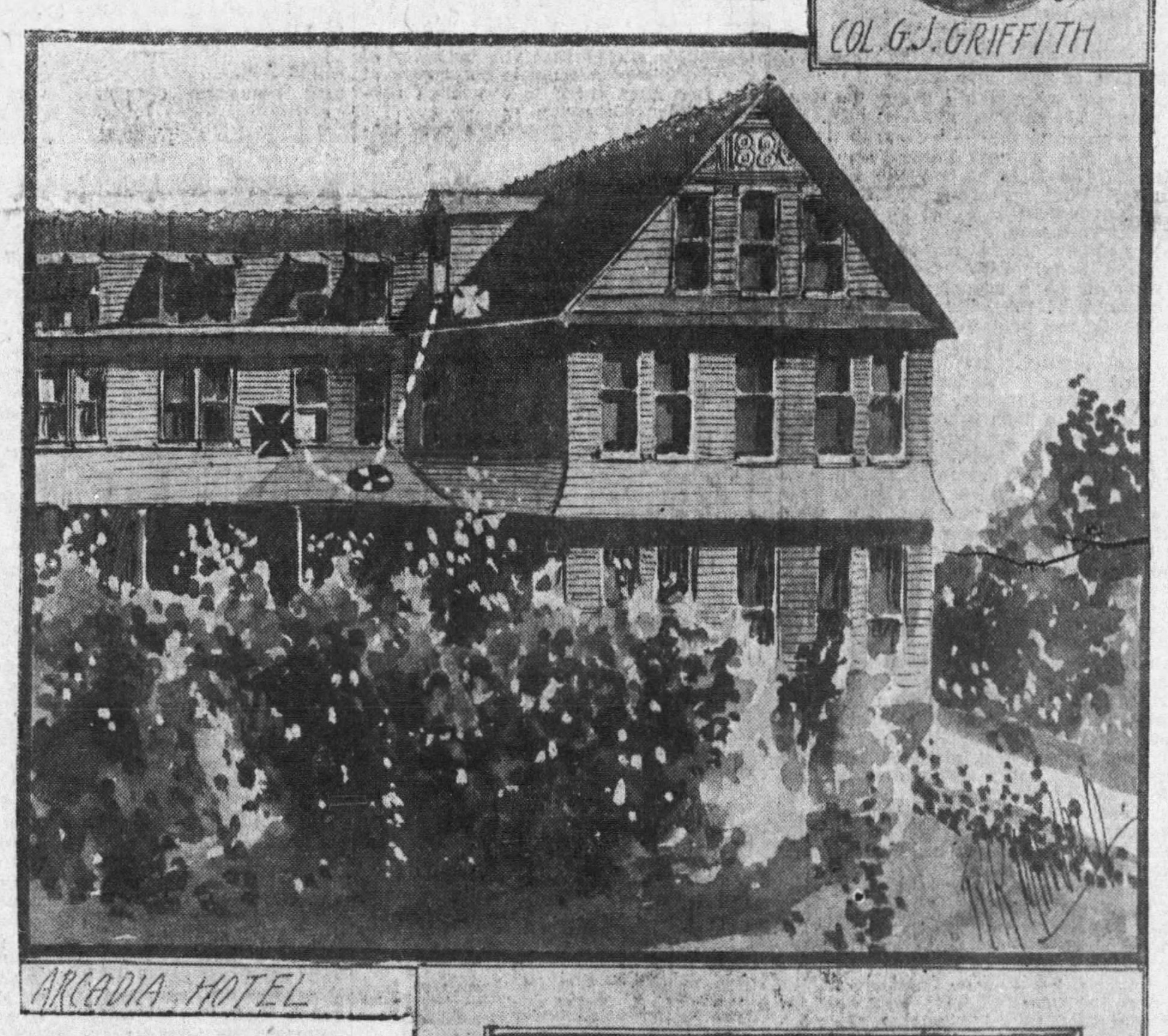
Los Angeles Times illustration (September 5, 1903): "The dotted line indicates where Mrs. Griffith leap or fall from the upper story to the porch roof."

Ultimately, patronage declined and the Arcadia Hotel was demolished in 1909.
