= City of Los Angeles Department of Recreation and Parks =

American government agency in California

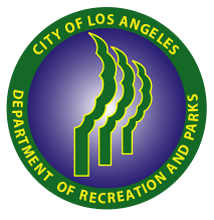

Department overview
- Formed: 1947
- Preceding agencies: Department of Parks; The Department of Playgrounds and Recreation
- Jurisdiction: City of Los Angeles
- Headquarters: Los Angeles 90012
- Department executive: Jimmy Kim, General Manager
- Website: www.laparks.org

The City of Los Angeles Department of Recreation and Parks operates and maintains Los Angeles City parks, playgrounds, swimming pools, golf courses, skateparks, and recreation centers, while also providing recreational programming.

== History ==
The Los Angeles City Council, established when the city charter was approved by the state in 1889, created the Department of Parks the same year of its establishment. In response to the need for proper recreational facilities for young people, the city established the Los Angeles Playground Commission in 1904; that same year, the commission founded the first municipal Playground Department in the United States. The first city playground opening the following year. In 1925, the city charter was changed and a Department of Playground and Recreation was created; the new charter also granted this new department and the Department of Parks control of their own funds. In 1947, voters approved an amendment to the charter that combined the Department of Parks and the Department of Playgrounds and Recreation into the Department of Recreation and Parks, combining the two organizations into its current form.

== Governance and organization ==
The Department of Recreation and Parks is an agency of the government of the City of Los Angeles and is organized and governed according to the City Charter. It is charged with establishing, constructing, maintaining, operating, and controlling parks and recreational facilities in its jurisdiction, as well as managing concessions or privileges for the purpose of public recreation in its facilities.

=== Board of Recreation and Park Commissioners ===
The department is controlled and managed by the Board of Recreation and Park Commissioners. The Board is charged with controlling parks and recreation sites, controlling, appropriating and expending money in the Recreation and Parks Fund and authorizing the City Treasurer to invest surplus funds under its control, and organizing the work of the department into divisions and appointing an administrative officers for them. The Board is also responsible for providing suitable quarters and resources for the department, creating positions in the department, authorizing deputies, assistants and employees and adopting budgets. The Board consists of five Commissioners, appointed by the Mayor and confirmed by the City Council to voluntarily serve five-year terms. The President and Vice President of the Board are elected by the Board from their members in their last meeting in July every year. The Board holds at least two monthly meetings, scheduled for the first and third Thursday of each month. The Board has two committees composed to two board members: the Commission Task Force on Facility Repair and Maintenance and the Commission Task Force on Concessions. The Board appoints a non-member to be secretary to the Board and another as the chief accounting employee who is in charge of approving the withdrawal of funds.

The department's chief administrative officer, the General Manager of Recreation and Parks, is charged with managing the affairs of the department. They appoint, discharge, suspend, or transfer department employees, issue instructions to employees, expend department funds, recommend budgets to the board, certify expenditures to the chief accounting employee, and file regular written reports with the board and the Mayor on department work. They are appointed by the Mayor, subject to confirmation by the City Council, as is the case with most chief administrative officers of the municipal government; the Mayor is also able to remove the Chief Administrative Officer, though the officer is able to appeal their removal to the City Council.

Executive Management Team
Member	Position
Jimmy Kim	General Manager
Matthew Rudnick	Executive Officer
Noel Williams	Chief Financial Officer
Cathie Santo Domingo	Assistant General Manager (Planning, Maintenance & Construction)
Brenda Aguirre	Assistant General Manager (Special Operations Branch)
Chinyere Stoneham	Assistant General Manager (Recreational Services Branch)

Board of Recreation and Park Commissioners
Commissioner	Position
Renata Simril	President
Luis A. Sánchez	Vice President
Marie Lloyd	Member
Fiona Hutton	Member
Benny Tran	Member

== Griffith Observatory ==
Since opening in 1935, Griffith Observatory has been owned and operated by the City of Los Angeles Department of Recreation and Parks.

== See also ==
- Los Angeles Recreation and Park Commission
- Los Angeles Park Ranger Division
