= Green Hills, Nashville, Tennessee =

Neighborhood in Nashville, Tennessee

Green Hills
- Neighborhood
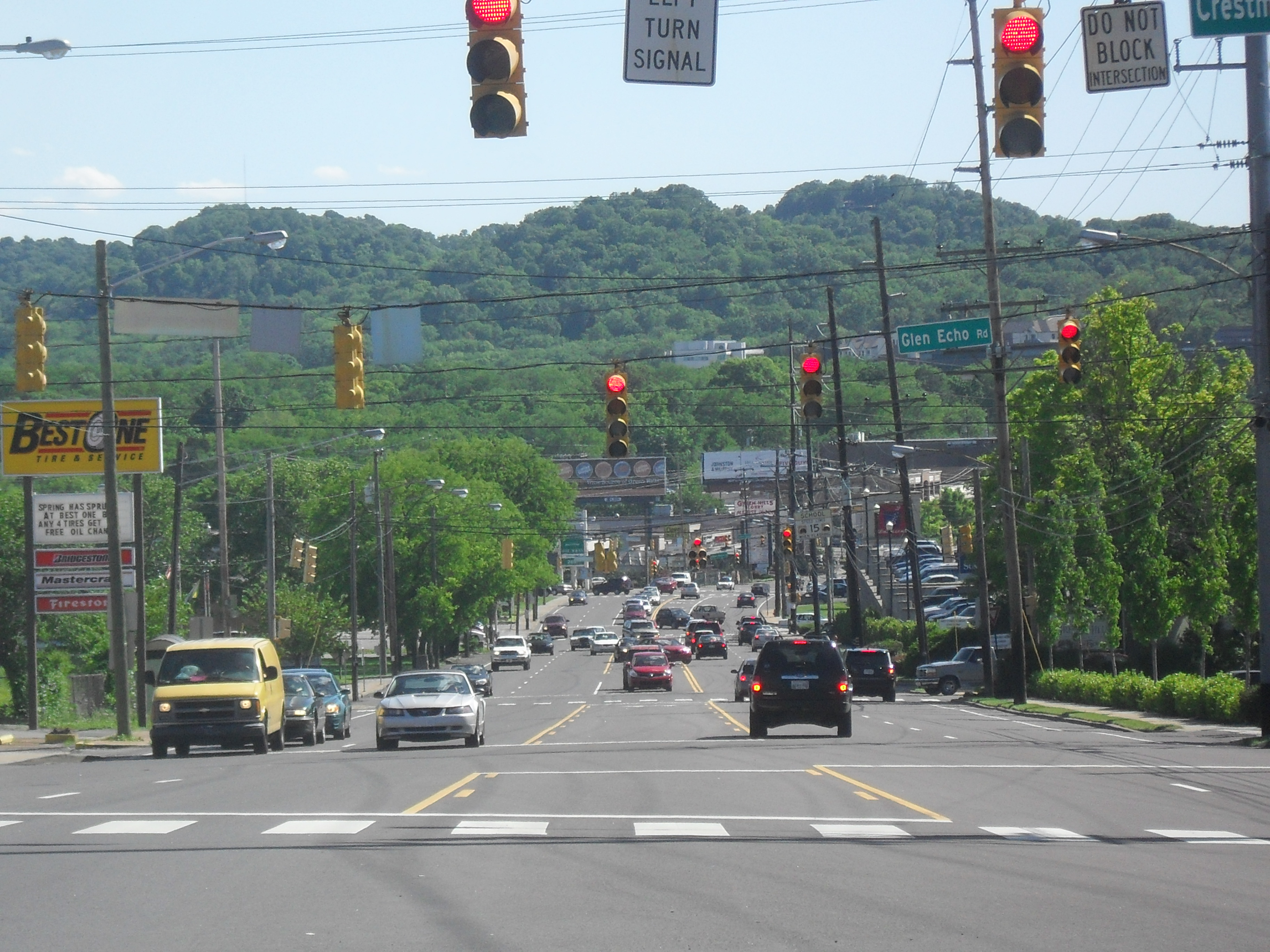
- Green Hills in 2010

- Location within Tennessee Location within the United States
- Coordinates: 36°06′13″N 86°49′00″W
- Country: United States
- State: Tennessee
- County: Davidson
- Time zone: UTC-6 (Central (CST))
  - Summer (DST): UTC-5 (CDT)
- Zip codes: 37215
- Area codes: 615, 629

Green Hills is an affluent neighborhood in Nashville, Tennessee, United States. Green Hills is located south of downtown Nashville on Hillsboro Pike (U.S. Highway 431/Tennessee State Route 106).

Green Hills is within a region extending south to Forest Hills and Williamson County and east-west to Oak Hill and Belle Meade. The neighborhood is in close proximity to three area universities – Vanderbilt, Belmont, and Lipscomb. The former streetcar suburb and urban neighborhood of Hillsboro Village is directly north across I-440.

The Mall at Green Hills is an enclosed shopping center, with its origins as a strip mall in the early 1950s. This was one of the first sizable developments of this type in Nashville. Nordstrom and the Apple Store are more recent additions to the mall. The Bluebird Cafe, a well-known live music venue, is located on Hillsboro Pike in Green Hills.

== History ==
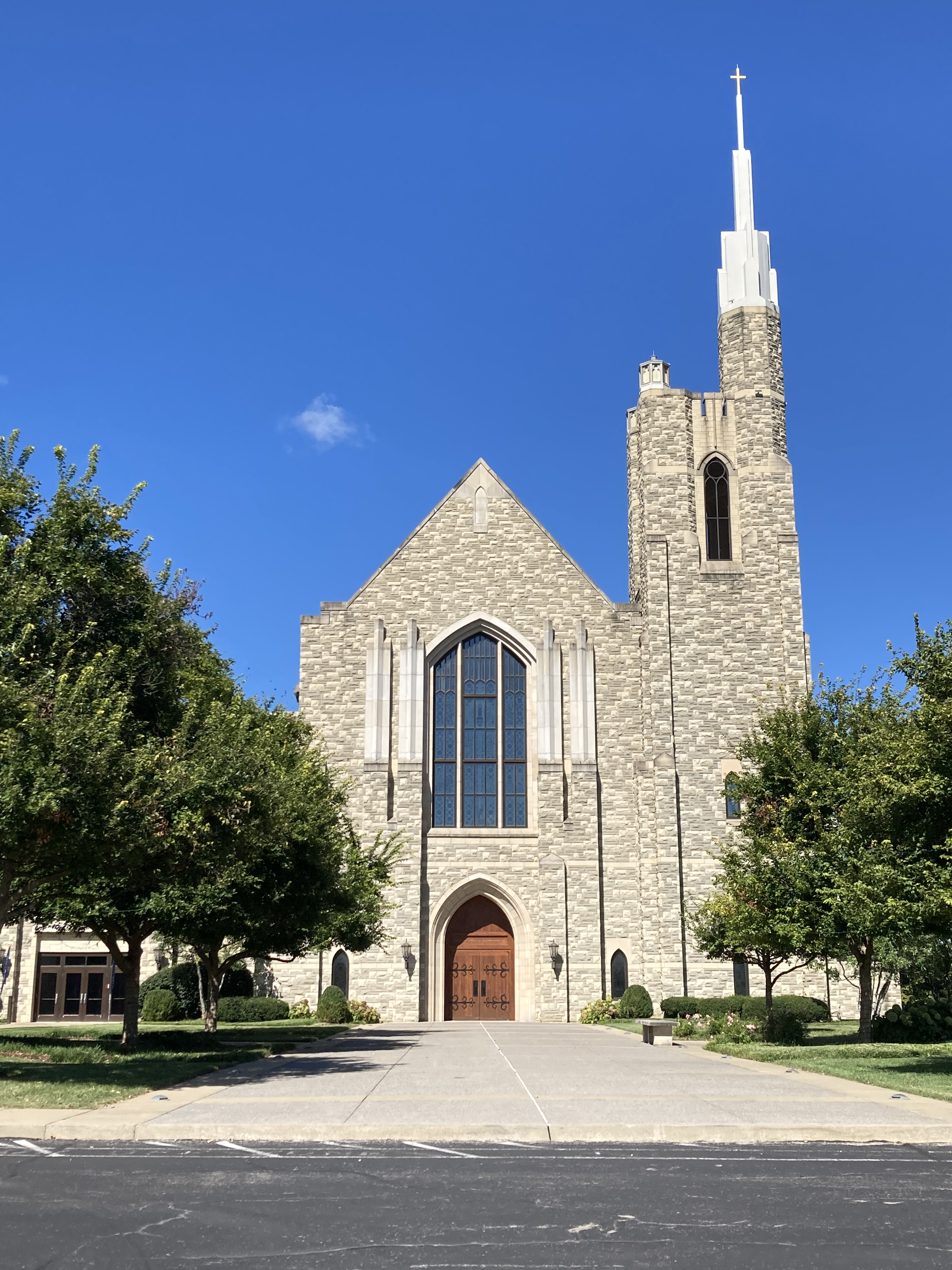
Covenant Presbyterian Church in Green Hills

Early important businesses included the Green Hills Market, one of Nashville's first true supermarkets, and the Green Hills Theater, a cinema. Both of these businesses are now defunct. Residential development began on a small scale in the 1930s, but Green Hills was not highly populated until after World War II. Although there were some preliminary plans toward making the neighborhood an incorporated town in the late 1950s and early 1960s, these never came to fruition.

Typical of its era, Green Hills is a suburban, automobile-oriented neighborhood. It originally consisted primarily of brick-veneer "ranch" style detached houses on large lots. In part due to the presence of subsurface septic sewage disposal systems; sewers were not added until well after the original development. In more recent years, there has been considerable infill as many larger lots and remaining open spaces have been redivided to become the sites of higher-density development.

As Green Hills is neither an incorporated town nor a census-designated place, an exact population is impossible to calculate. The area is roughly bounded to the north by I-440, to the south by Harding Place, to the west by Estes Road, and to the east by Lealand Lane. This area is approximately coextensive with the northern half of United States Postal Service's ZIP code 37215, designated "Green Hills Station". Even so, residents and businesses have a "Nashville, TN" mailing address, unlike some other neighborhoods in Metro Nashville.

Hillsboro High School, located directly across the highway from the Mall, actually predates much of the neighborhood. Another public educational institution is Julia Green Elementary School, a primary school. Major private educational institutions include Lipscomb University (along with its associated elementary and high schools), and Harpeth Hall School, a private all girls' college Prep school, (grades 5th-12th)

In 2023, a mass shooting occurred at The Covenant School in Green Hills, killing three children, three adults, and the perpetrator.
