= Griffith J. Griffith =

American philanthropist, attempted murderer

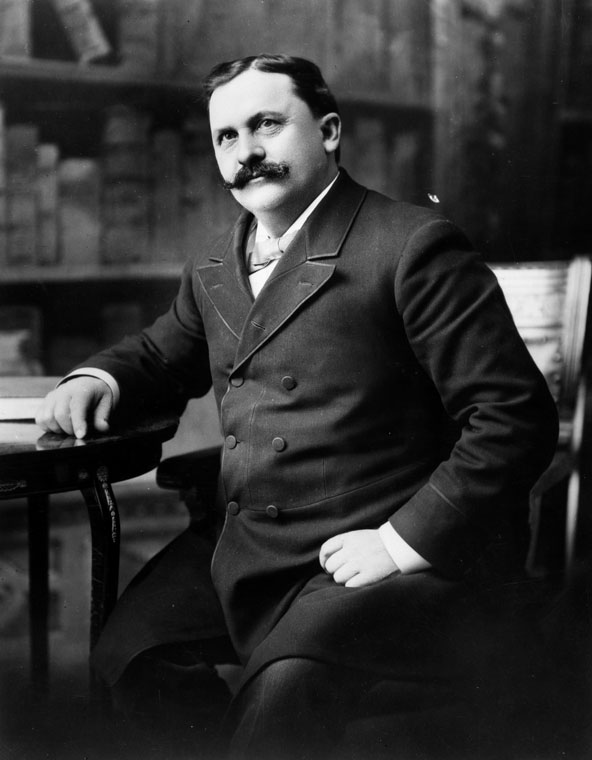
- Born: Griffith Jenkins Griffith; January 4, 1850; Bettws, Glamorganshire, Wales
- Died: July 6, 1919 (aged 69); Los Angeles, California, U.S.
- Resting place: Hollywood Memorial Cemetery; Los Angeles
- Other names: Colonel Griffith J. Griffith
- Occupations: Journalist; Mining and real estate magnate
- Known for: Philanthropy, assault with a deadly weapon
- Spouse: Mary Agnes Christina Mesmer (1887–1904; divorced)
- Children: Vandell Mowry Griffith (1888–1974)

Griffith Jenkins Griffith (January 4, 1850 – July 6, 1919) was a Welsh-born American industrialist and philanthropist. After amassing a significant fortune from a mining syndicate in the 1880s, Griffith donated 3,015 acres (1,220 ha) to the City of Los Angeles that became Griffith Park, and he bequeathed the money to build the park's Greek Theatre and Griffith Observatory. Griffith's legacy was marred by his notorious shooting of his wife in 1903, a crime for which he served a year and nine months in prison.

== Life ==
=== Career and philanthropy ===
Griffith J. Griffith was born in Bettws, Glamorganshire, Wales, on January 4, 1850, to Margaret Jenkins Morgan and Griffith M. Griffith. He immigrated to the United States in 1865, settling in Ashland, Pennsylvania. In 1873, he moved to San Francisco, California, and became manager of the Herald Publishing Company. In 1887, he married Mary Agnes Christina Mesmer (1864–1948), a daughter of early Los Angeles settler and businessman Louis Mesmer.

In 1878, G. J. Griffith became mining correspondent for the Alta California, a San Francisco newspaper. As a reporter, he gained extensive knowledge of the mining industry on the Pacific Coast and in Nevada, which led to his employment by various mining syndicates. As a mining expert, Griffith acquired a fortune.

In 1882, Griffith moved to Los Angeles and purchased approximately 4,000 acres (1,600 ha) of the Rancho Los Feliz Mexican land grant. On December 16, 1896, Griffith and his wife Christina presented 3,015 acres (1,220 ha) of the Rancho Los Feliz to the city of Los Angeles for use as a public park. Griffith called it "a Christmas present." After accepting the donation, the city passed an ordinance to name the property Griffith Park, in honor of the donor.

"It must be made a place of rest and relaxation for the masses, a resort for the rank and file, for the plain people," Griffith told the Los Angeles City Council when he donated the land. "I consider it my obligation to make Los Angeles a happy, cleaner, and finer city. I wish to pay my debt of duty in this way to the community in which I have prospered."

Griffith later donated another 1,000 acres (400 ha) along the Los Angeles River.

=== Crime ===
While vacationing in Santa Monica on September 3, 1903, Griffith shot his wife Tina Mesmer Griffith in the presidential suite of the Arcadia Hotel, as she knelt on the floor before him. The shot did not kill her, but she was left disfigured and lost her right eye. Griffith was charged with assault with a deadly weapon with intent to commit murder. The prosecution was led by Henry T. Gage, former governor of California. Griffith was defended by attorney Earl Rogers, whose cross-examination of the veiled Mrs. Griffith revealed that her husband—generally thought to be a teetotaler—was in fact a secret drunk who was subject to paranoid delusions. Griffith was convicted of a lesser charge, assault with a deadly weapon. The judge sentenced him to two years in San Quentin State Prison, and a $5,000 fine, instructing that he be given "medical aid for his condition of alcoholic insanity". He served time from April 5, 1905 to December 6, 1906.

On November 4, 1904, while he was in jail, Mrs. Griffith was granted a divorce on the grounds of cruelty, and she was awarded custody of their 16-year-old son Vandell. The court also stated that G. J. Griffith would pay for his son's education at Stanford University. The decree was made in the record time of four and a half minutes.

=== Later life ===
G. J. Griffith was released from prison December 3, 1906, after serving nearly two years. His conduct at the penitentiary was called exemplary. Griffith returned to Los Angeles and began lecturing on prison reform.

In December 1912, Griffith offered a second "Christmas present" to Los Angeles, in the form of a Greek Theater and a Hall of Science to be built at his expense in Griffith Park. The offer was accepted by the City Council, but members of the Park Commission objected and instituted a court action to block the donation. Griffith left the offer in his will. He died of liver disease on July 6, 1919. The bulk of his $1.5 million estate was bequeathed to the city for the building of the Greek Theater (1929) and Griffith Observatory (1935). He is interred at the Hollywood Forever Cemetery in Los Angeles in the north end of Section 7, a.k.a. "The Griffith Lawn". While standing at the side of his obelisk and looking north, one can see the Griffith Observatory.

Griffith used the title of Colonel, but official records of military service which support this rank have not been found. Evidence suggests the only military title he ever held was Major of rifle practice with the California National Guard.

== Additional images ==
Griffith J. Griffith
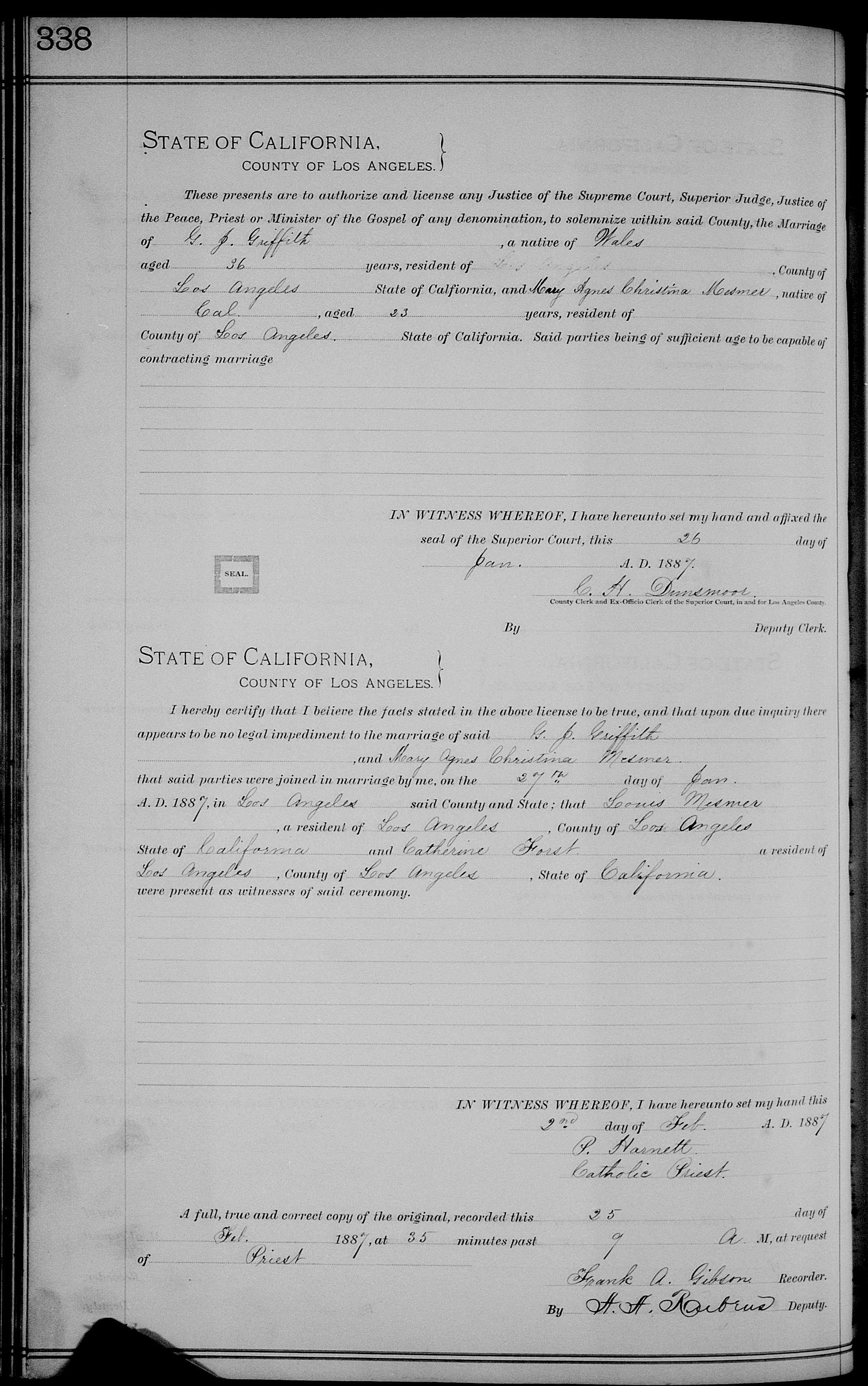
Mary Agnes Christina Mesmer & Griffith Jenkins Griffith marriage record, 1887

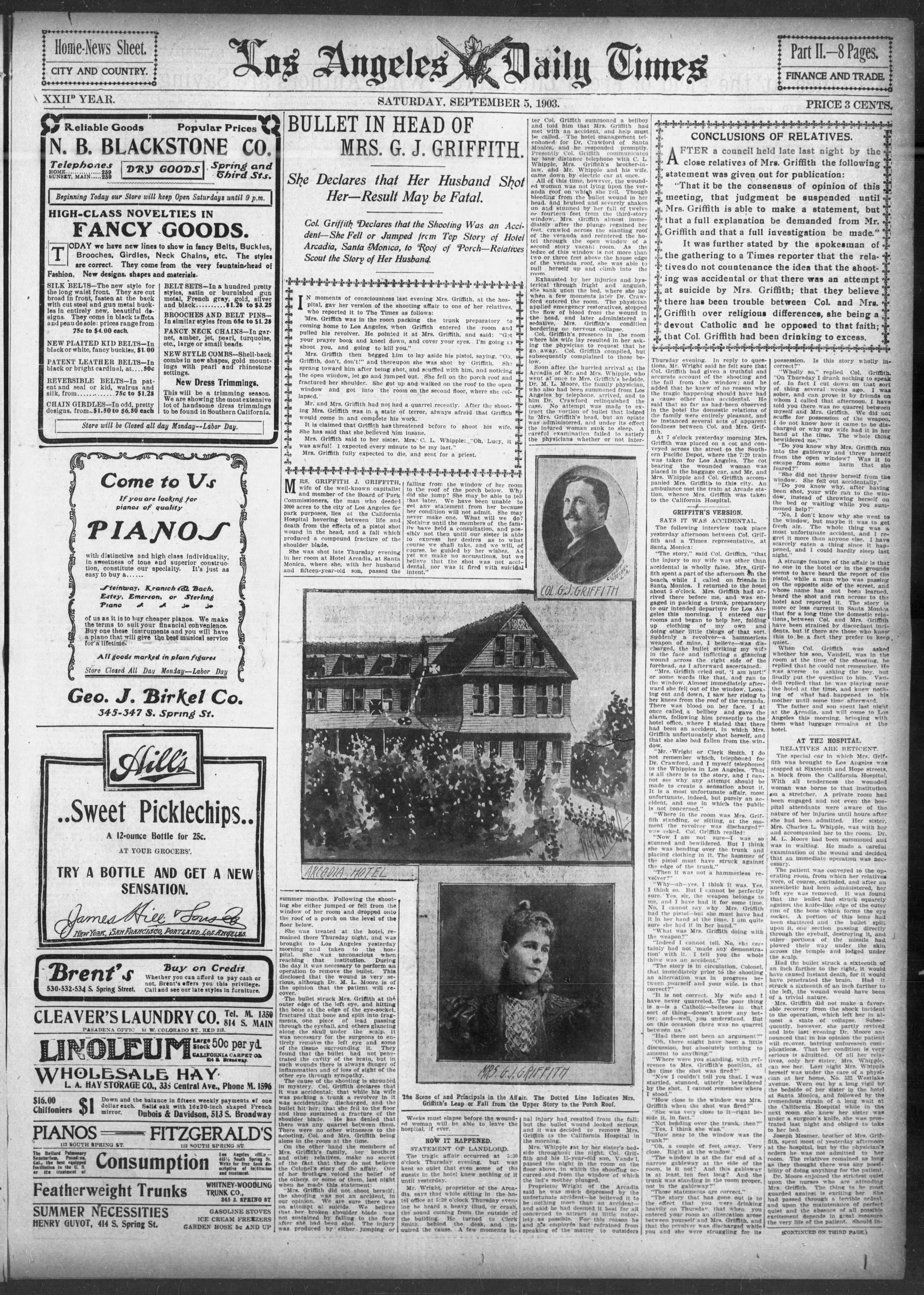
Griffith J. Griffith shot his wife in the face

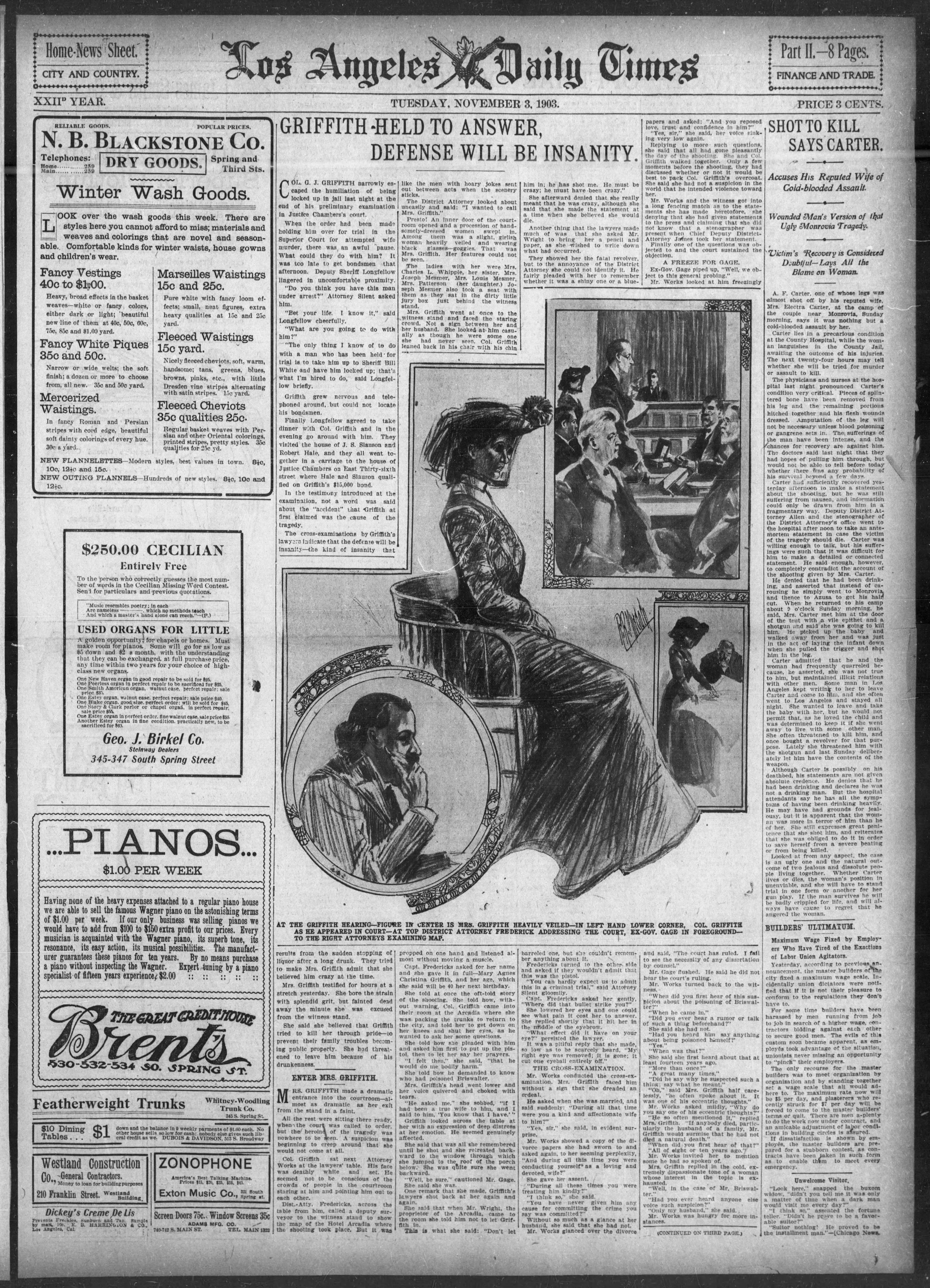
Tina Mesmer testified while heavily veiled; the shooting disfigured her face and destroyed her right eye

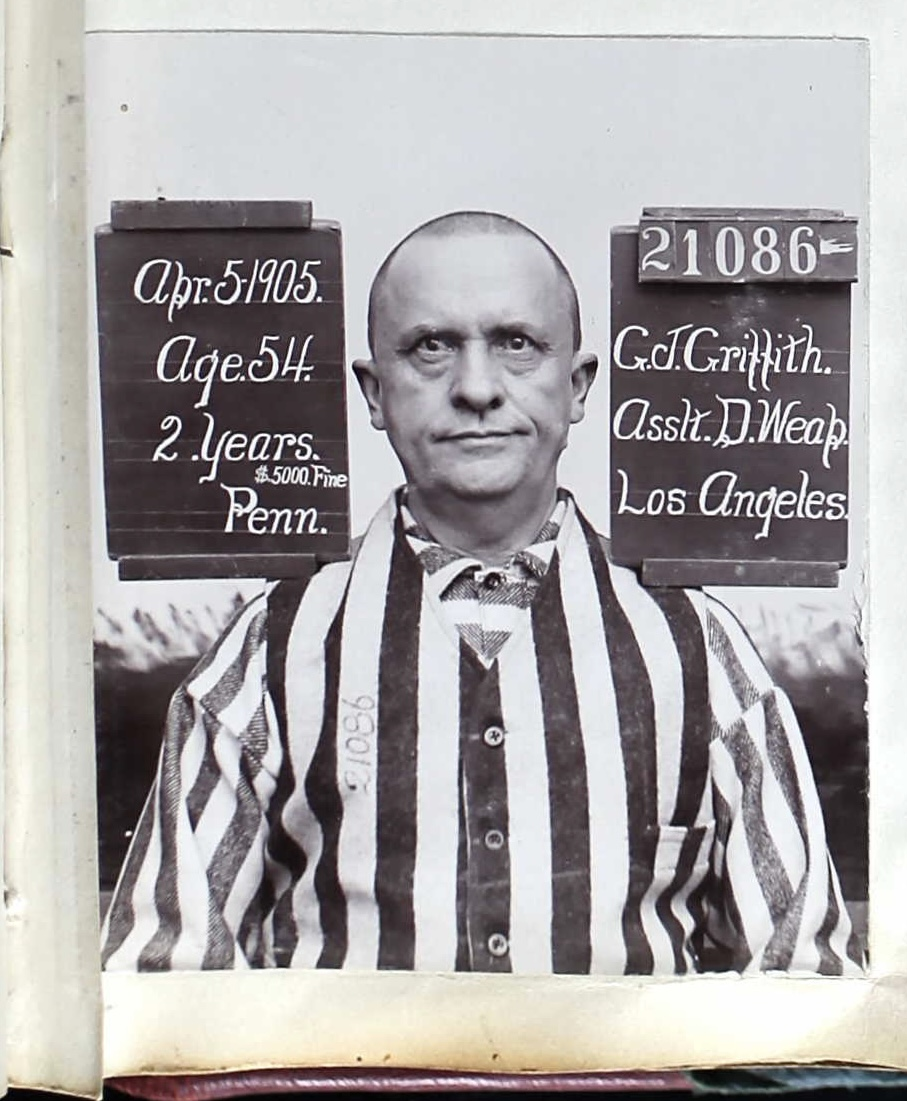
Griffith J. Griffith mug shot, photographed for the San Quentin State Prison register

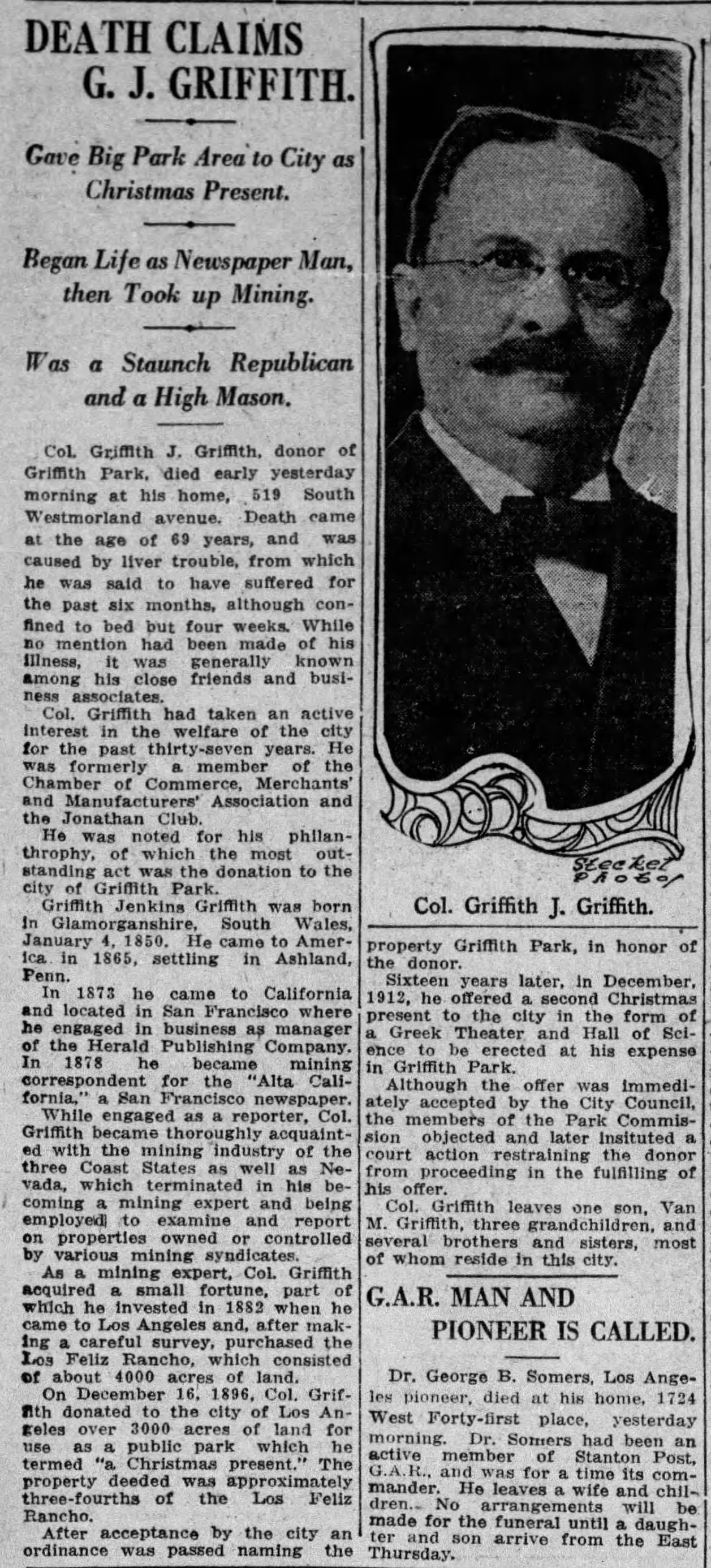
LATimes obit: Death Claims G.J. Griffith

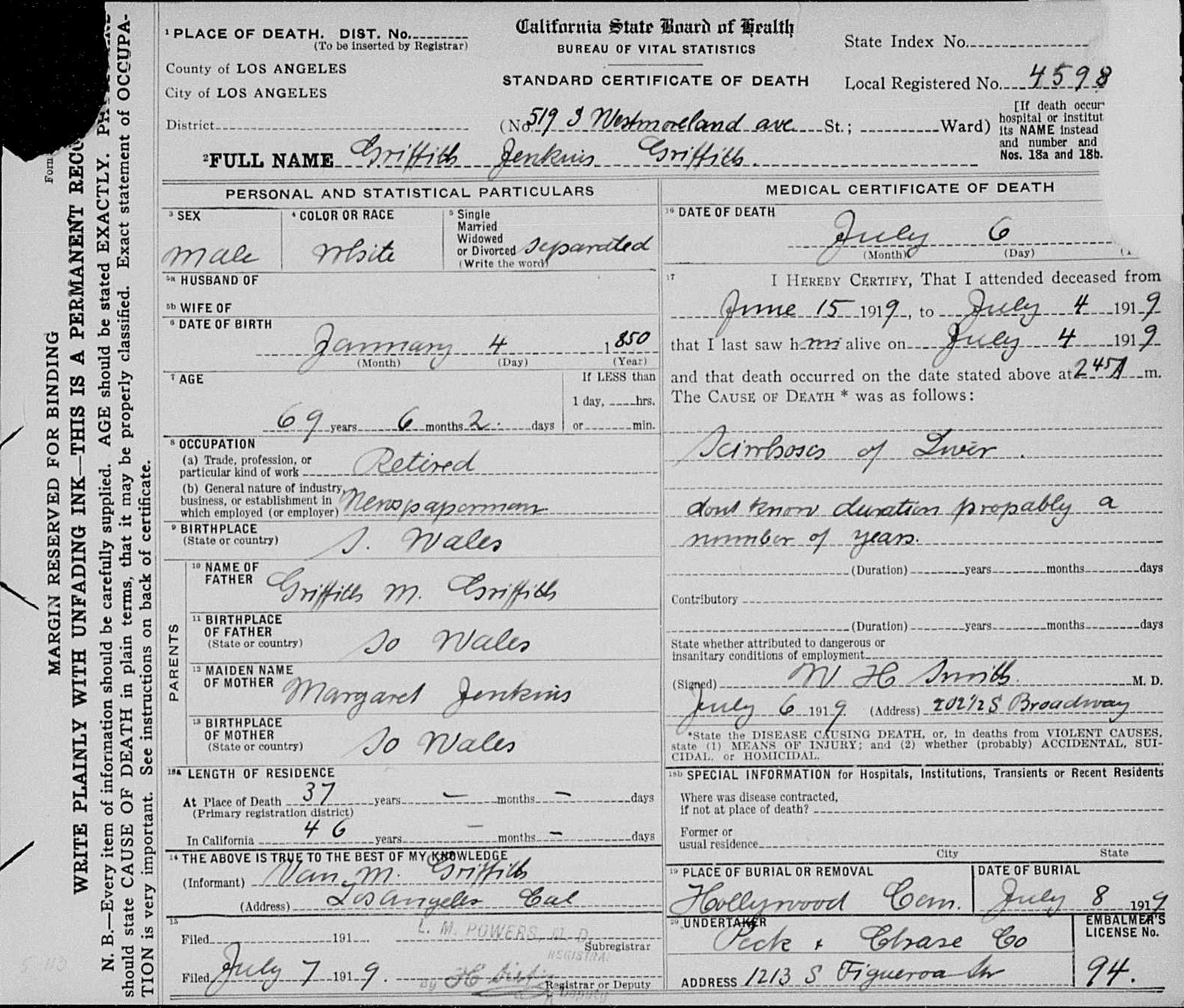
Griffith Jenkins Griffith death certificate
