= Renata Simril =

American nonprofit organization executive

Renata Simril is an established leader and civic organizer in Southern California who serves as the president and CEO of LA84 Foundation and president of the Play Equity Fund, legacy organizations of the 1984 Los Angeles Olympic Summer Games. The LA84 Foundation funds youth sport programs, infrastructure projects, commissions research, and creates educational initiatives. Her career has included serving as Deputy Mayor of Economic Development and Housing for the City of Los Angeles, Senior Vice President of External Affairs for the Los Angeles Dodgers, and Chief of Staff of the Los Angeles Times, a background that provides her with perspective across government, professional sports and media. To expand the work of the LA84 Foundation, Simril founded the Play Equity Fund, LA84's charitable partner, as a platform for advocacy and community partnerships.

== LA84 Foundation & The Play Equity Fund ==
Since the LA84 Foundation was established in 1985, three primary activities have supported its mission ("Life Ready Through Sport") of expanding access to youth sports in Southern California. These include grant-making investments in sports activities intended to create, expand and/or enhance structured youth sport participation across the region, with a particular emphasis on underserved communities, including girls, children of color, and physically challenged and developmentally disabled; coaching education and training; and, research, by developing youth sports related resources and public information.

For over four decades since the 1984 Olympic Games, the Foundation has impacted the region through investments of over $300 million in grants and programs to fund more than 2,500 organizations in support of over 4 million young people; supported the construction and/or renovation of over 400 fields, pools and courts; educational/training clinics for more than 100,000 coaches; and its campus features one of the nation's largest sports libraries and Olympic memorabilia collections.

To deepen the LA84 Foundation's impact, Simril launched the Play Equity Fund. She is credited with establishing the concept and term of "play equity" -- terminology which has expanded nationally to define the disparities between youth who have access to the lifelong benefits of sport, play and movement, and young people who do not. Under her leadership, the two organizations advance initiatives to expand access to play, create cross-sector partnerships, and revitalize infrastructure in Southern California.

The Play Equity Fund was the champion of AB 749, the Youth Sports For All Act. Simril led the advocacy for the legislation that was signed into law by Governor Gavin Newsom for children across California to have access to sports, play and movement. It will create a Blue-Ribbon commission to examine the current landscape of youth sports and make recommendations for establishing a centralized entity to ensure fair access to quality sports programs for all youth in California.

== Career ==
Prior to her appointment to the LA84 Foundation, Simril had most recently served as Senior Vice President and Chief of Staff to the Publisher of the Los Angeles Times, where she oversaw staff operations and special projects. Her earlier career included three seasons with the Los Angeles Dodgers, where she served as Senior Vice President of External Affairs overseeing the restoration of the Dodgers brand and the Dodgers Foundation; and over a decade worked in real estate development with Jones Lang LaSalle, Forest City Development and LCOR, Inc.

Her public service included serving as Deputy Mayor for Economic Development and Housing in the Hahn Administration, where she worked to expand rental and affordable housing in Los Angeles, and as a Development Deputy to Los Angeles City Councilman Mark Ridley-Thomas, where she worked to help rebuild communities in South Los Angeles after the 1992 civil unrest. Simril began her career in the U.S. Army as a Military Police Officer in the U.S. and Germany.

== Community Service & Awards ==
Ms. Simril is active in the community outside of LA84 Foundation, previously serving on the Boards of United Way of Greater Los Angeles; LA 2028 Olympic Bid Committee; and currently serves on the boards of the Los Angeles Sports and Entertainment Commission and the Los Angeles Dodgers Foundation. She formerly served as a Governor's Appointee on the California Science Center Board, where she led successful negotiations of long-term lease agreements for USC to manage and operate the Coliseum and Sports Arena properties; was chair of the Board of Regents for LMU, and was a board member of the Lusk Center for Real Estate at USC. In 2024, she received the USC Alumni Merit Award.

In 2022, she was appointed to the Governor's Advisory Committee for Physical Fitness and Mental Well-Being by Governor Gavin Newsom, a statewide effort to promote health and wellness to Californians of all ages. She previously served as President of the City of Los Angeles Department of Recreation & Parks, a position she was appointed to by Mayor Karen Bass. In 2023, Simril was selected to be a Regents' Lecturer at the UCLA School of Sociology, a program where leaders enhance education.

Simril was selected by Sports Illustrated as one of the 100 Most Influential Black Women in Sports in 2022. She has been named to the Orange County Register's 50 Most Powerful in Southern California Sports list and for over a decade has been selected to the Los Angeles Business Journal's list of the 500 Most Influential People. CSQ magazine named Simril a Visionary in Sports and Entertainment, 2017, and she has been honored as the WISE LA (Women in Sports and Entertainment) Women of Inspiration award. Sports Business Journal recognized Simril as one of their Game Changers.

== Personal ==
Ms. Simril is a third generation Angeleno. She earned a bachelor's degree in Urban Studies from Loyola Marymount University and a master's degree in Real Estate Development from the University of Southern California.
