= Jangal (disambiguation) =

Jangal is a city in Razavi Khorasan Province, Iran.

Jangal (Persian: جنگل) may also refer to:

- Jangal, Hormozgan, a village in Hormozgan province, Iran
- Jangal Tir Ahmad, a village in Hormozgan province, Iran
- Jangal, Khash, a village in Sistan and Baluchestan province, Iran
- Jangal, Qasr-e Qand, a village in Sistan and Baluchestan province, Iran
- Jangal, Rask, a village in Sistan and Baluchestan province, Iran
- Jangal-e Mukan, a village in Sistan and Baluchestan province, Iran
- Jangal, South Khorasan, a village in South Khorasan province, Iran
- Jangal District, an administrative subdivision of Razavi Khorasan province, Iran
- Jangal Rural District (disambiguation), administrative subdivisions in Iran
- Jangla Desh, an area of India; see History of Bikaner
- Jangal (magazine), a political magazine
- Jangal, Nadia, a census town in West Bengal, India
- Jangal, Tajikistan, a village near Panjakent, Tajikistan

== See also ==
- Jangala (disambiguation)
- Jungle (disambiguation)
- Jangali (disambiguation)
- Jangle (disambiguation)
- Jangla, a village in Punajab, India
- Jangil, an indigenous people of India
