= Jangali =

Jangali or Jangli may refer to:

- Jungle Movement of Gilan, 1915–1921 rebellion in Gilan, Iran
- Jangli, Fars, a village in Fars Province, Iran
- Jangali, Kerman, a village in Kerman Province, Iran
- Jhangvi dialect, also known as Jangli, a Western Punjabi dialect
- Jangali Jayagad, a fort in Maharashtra, India
- Jangali Maharaj, a 19th-century Indian Hindu saint
- Rawat language or Jangali language, a Sino-Tibetan language of India

== See also ==
- Jangal (disambiguation)
- Jangli Maharaj Road (disambiguation)
- Junglee (disambiguation)
- Jangalia, a village in West Bengal, India
- Jangalia Gaon Ganja, a village in Uttarakhand, India
- Jangaliya Pura, a village in Madhya Pradesh, India
