= Big box =

Big Box, Big box, or Big-box may refer to:

- Big-box store, a form of retail outlet
- Big-box centre or power center, a form of retail outlet
- Big Box (device), a device for enabling internet access
- Big Box Mart, a 2005 video by JibJab

== See also ==
- Big Box Ordinance, a 2006 Chicago living-wage legislation
- Big Blue Box, a videogame developer
- Big Brown Box, an audio retailer
