= Culver Boulevard =

Thoroughfare in Los Angeles, California

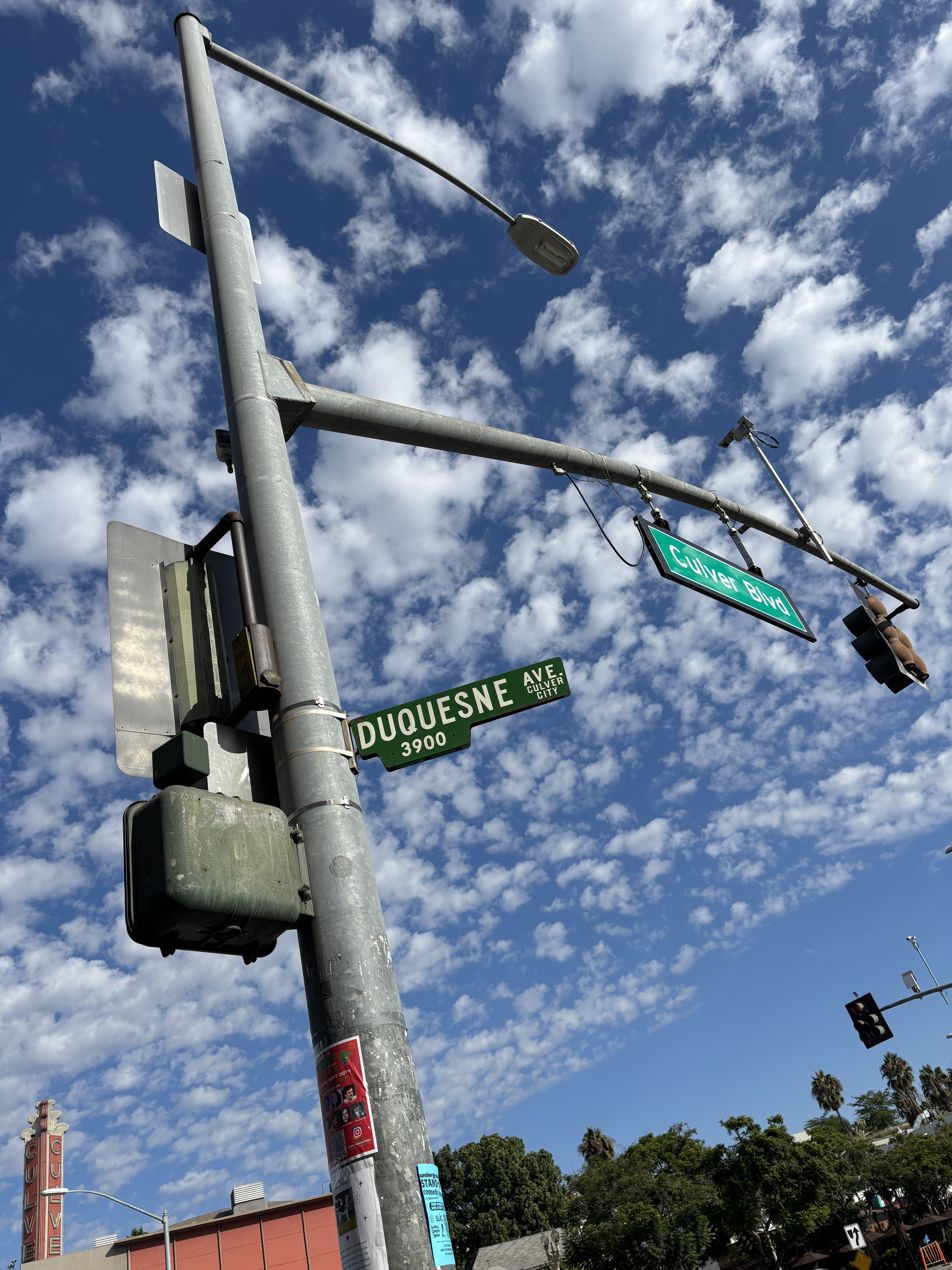
- Former names: Speedway, Playa Del Rey Road, Redondo Road, Putnam Avenue
- Namesake: Harry H. Culver
- Length: 6 mi (9.7 km)
- Location: Playa Del Rey, Los Angeles; Ballona Wetlands; Del Rey, Los Angeles; Culver City, California
- Nearest metro station: Culver City station
- West end: Trolleyway South, Playa Del Rey
- East end: Venice Boulevard

Culver Boulevard is an east-west thoroughfare in the Westside region of Los Angeles County, California, connecting Venice Boulevard (near the transit junction of downtown Culver City) to the coast roads.

Except for the downtown Culver City shopping district, the route is mostly residential with some "small markets and restaurants."

== Name ==
Culver was laid out in 1904 as a parallel auto route for the Playa Del Rey streetcar route established in 1902. The road had various names in its early years, including Speedway, the Ballona Road, the Playa Del Rey Road, the Redondo Road, the Hollywood-Redondo Boulevard, and Putnam Avenue. The name Culver Boulevard seems to have been settled upon around 1925, following the annexation of Venice by the city of Los Angeles.

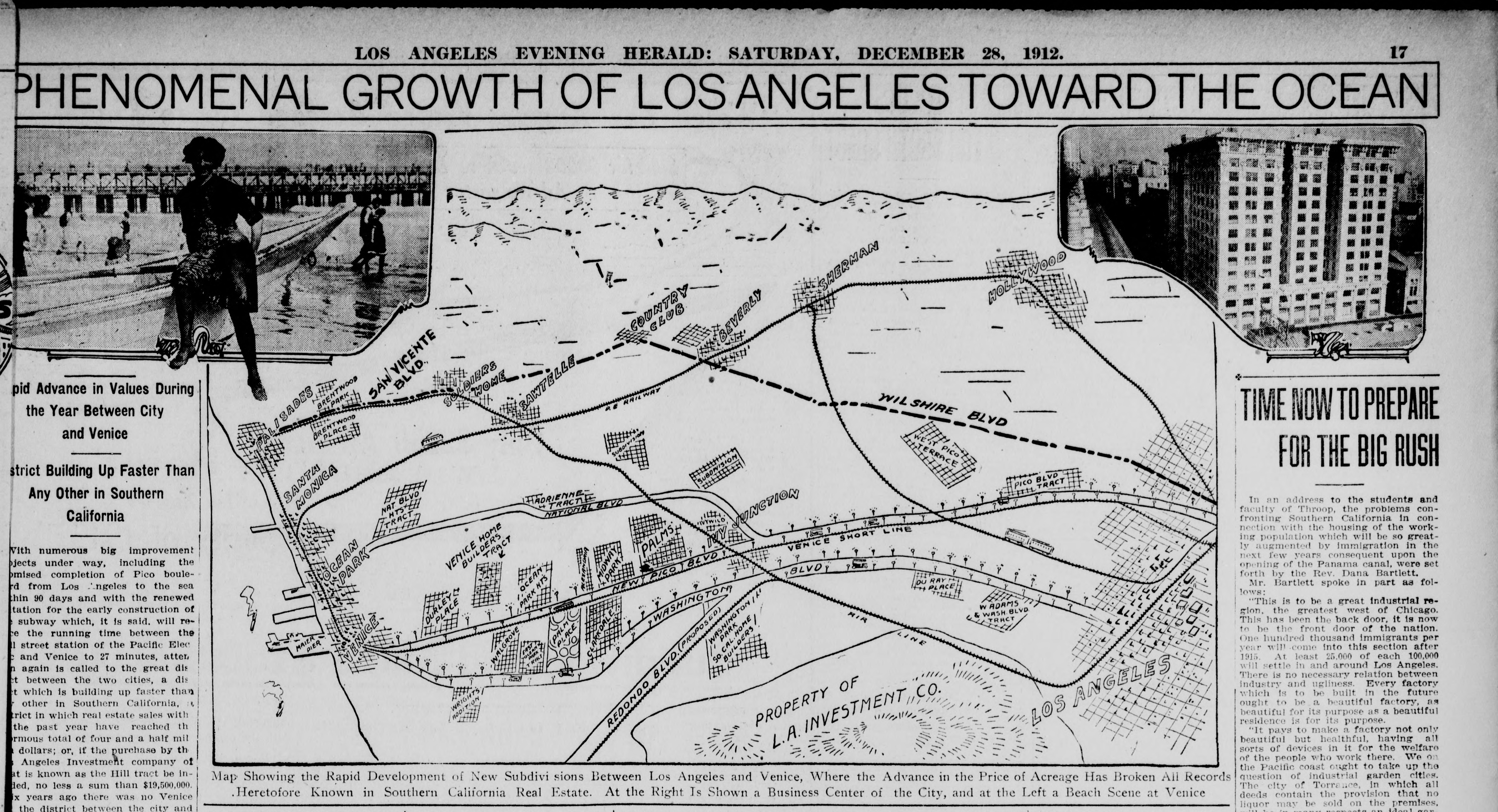
"Phenomenal Growth of Los Angeles Toward the Ocean" (1912) shows "Redondo Road"; notice the mapmaker's efforts to show that Venice (then called New Pico Blvd.) and Washington have street lights, while Culver (then called Redondo) does not.

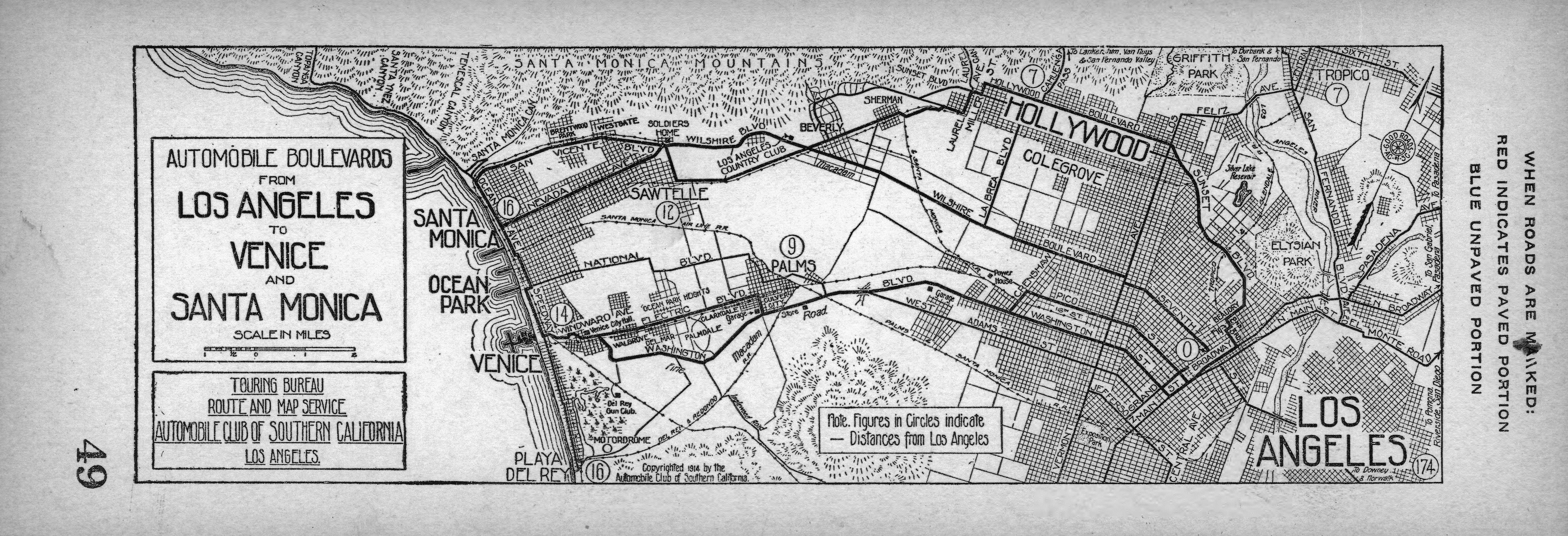
Circa 1914, the Auto Club route map noted only that there was “macadam” along the Del Rey tracks.

== History ==
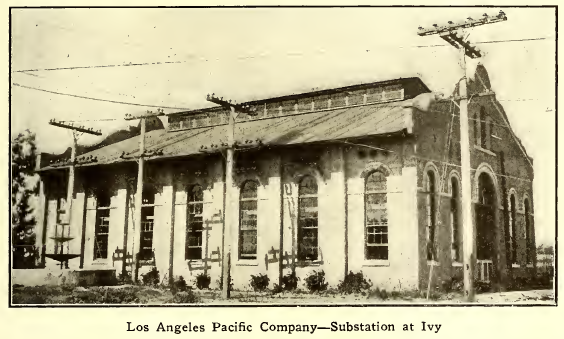
Ivy substation (pictured 1909) still stands at the eastern terminus of Culver Blvd.

The development of what is now Culver Boulevard was a project of the Automobile Club of Southern California, which was lobbying for roadways for private vehicles at a time when railways or even horses-and-carriages were the primary means of transportation around Los Angeles. In fall 1903, rights-of-way were granted by landowner R.C. Gillis and the Los Angeles Pacific Railway for the planned road, which was to be 30 ft (9.1 m) wide. By December, the Los Angeles Times was reporting "Greased Rushaway from Los Angeles to Playa Del Rey Fully Assured." The plan was for a "seven-mile straightaway" from Ivy Station (described as just beyond the junction of Adams and Washington streets) to the beach resort village of Playa Del Rey.

Industrialist Homer Laughlin weighed in, advocating firmly in favor of automobiles generally in February 1904.

At present the public does little else but slur the automobile as a 'red devil of destruction.' If people want good roads let them cease their outcry against the automobile, for through that agency [the Automobile Club of Southern California] good roads will be obtained. The road to Playa Del Rey is rapidly nearing completion and a heavy layer of macadam is being placed on the approach to the seashore that passes over the sand.

— Homer Laughlin, Los Angeles Times, February 14, 1904

Elsewhere in the paper that day, the plan for what would become Culver Boulevard was succinctly summarized: "The plan is to leave Ivy Station, just this side of Palms, and parallel the Los Angeles-Pacific's electric road's line to Playa Del Rey." Apparently this route's advantages included that the "friendly" railway was offering their rights-of-way and that its "gravel pits, cars and tracks" would help the Auto Club with the "big fill across the marsh from Alla station to the beach."

By May 1904, the road was being called Speedway, the first of its names. The road-building was started from the west, Beach to City; the rights-of-way closer to the city were proving more of a challenge.

As of August 1904, boosters were pitching the "nearly straight" railroad route from Ivy Station to the Playa Del Rey resort "paralleling" the "nearly complete" Auto Club speedway. Sometime in late August or early September, "graders at work on the automobile road found the remains of two persons."

By 1907, the Los Angeles Times reported that men who wanted to go duck hunting at the Ballona, "have such good roads to go over that the automobile is as generally used for transportation as the electric cars…The road taken by the Ballona clubmen runs out either Washington or Adams streets to the junction near Ivy Station, and continues out on the Ballona road, branching off to go to clubs at various points near the beach."

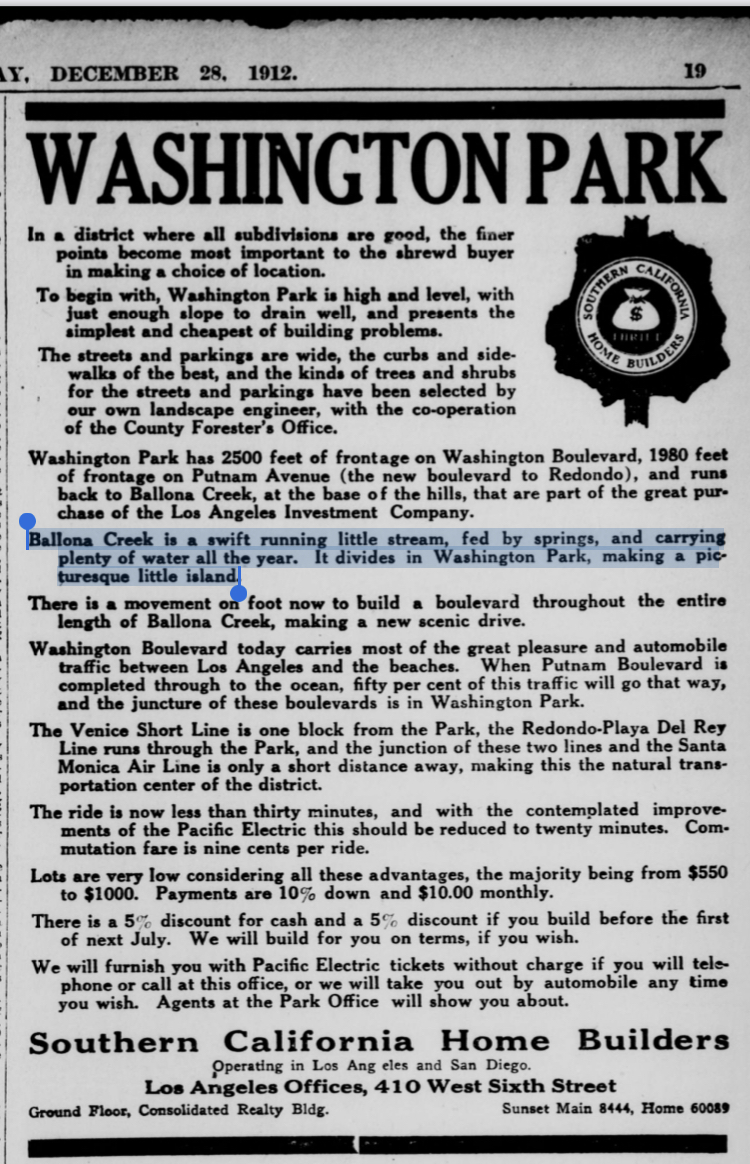
Advertisement for Washington Park neighborhood mentions Putnam Avenue, 1912

Circa 1911, "Down to Ivy Station, the road is bad, then it is ordinary as far as Palms, fairly good as far as Clarkdale, and beyond that it is pretty good in the middle, but along the edges are ruts…to the intersection with the Motordrome road the going is ordinarily good, but beyond that for half a mile it is bad."

In 1912 real estate developer Harry Culver worked to refine the segment of the Playa Del Rey route that passed through his forthcoming "Culver City" real estate project. He called it "Putnam Boulevard" and the Los Angeles Evening Herald reported, "According to present plans, Putnam boulevard will follow the line of the Pacific Electric Playa del Rey line through Washington Park to a point west of Inglewood [Avenue]...It will form an automobile outlet for thousands of acres of land lying between the Washington boulevard and Redondo boulevard that heretofore has been inaccessible by automobile…It will be fully 100 feet in width the entire distance and lined by artistic electroliers, forming a great white way from Los Angeles to Redondo."

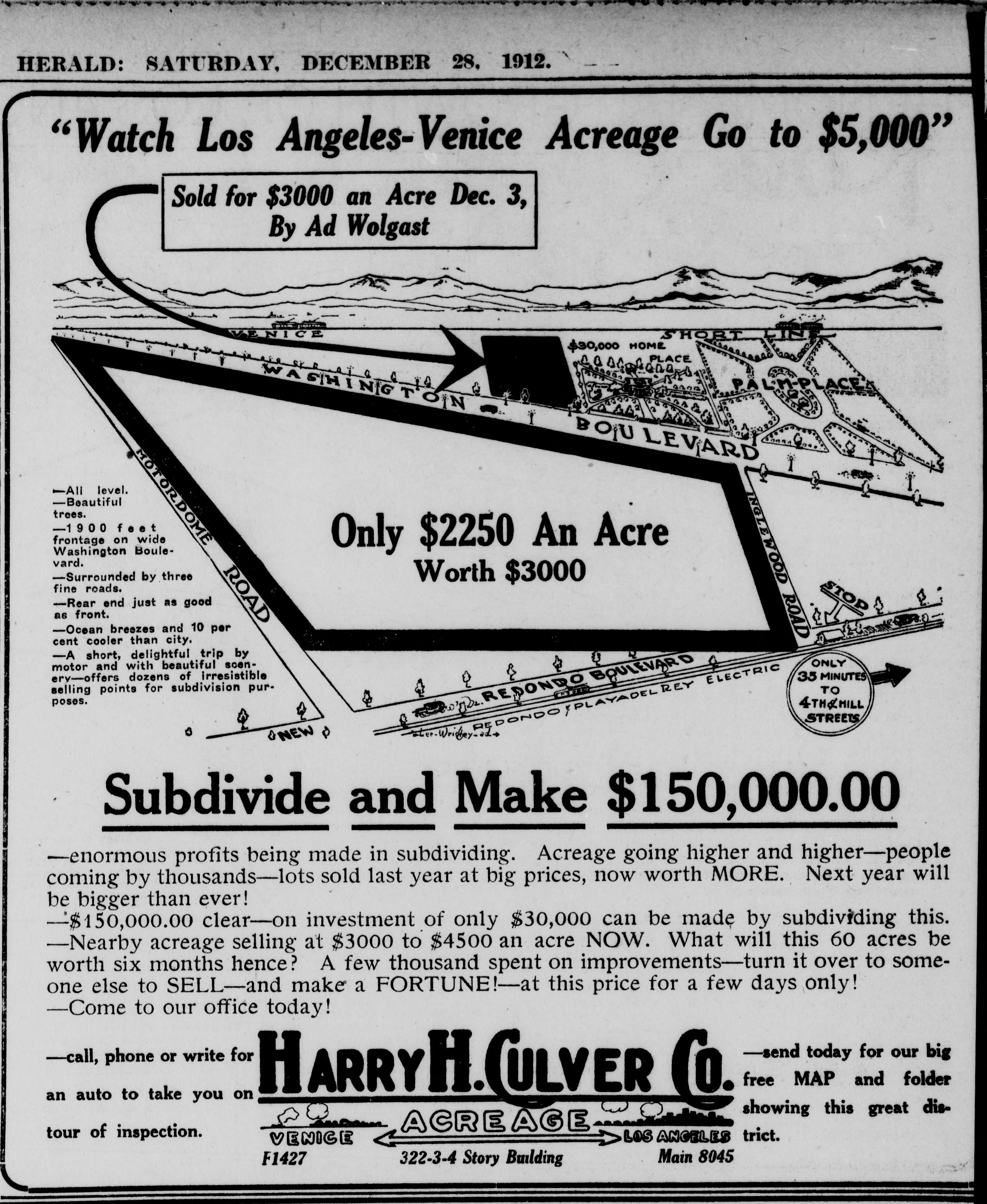
Map of Del Rey, Los Angeles area circa 1912

The Culver Boulevard nomenclature was decided in 1925-26, and for a period of months in 1926 the designation referred to the entirety of what is now Robertson Boulevard, beginning in West Hollywood all the way down Vista Del Mar to Manhattan Beach and beyond.

However, Harry Culver apparently objected and the old so-called Hollywood-Redondo Road was not unified, but separated, into Culver and Robertson, with the division lying at Venice Boulevard.

Putman Avenue is still labeled on the 1928 Pacific Electric route map, but in small print, whereas Culver Boulevard is marked in bright green capital letters.

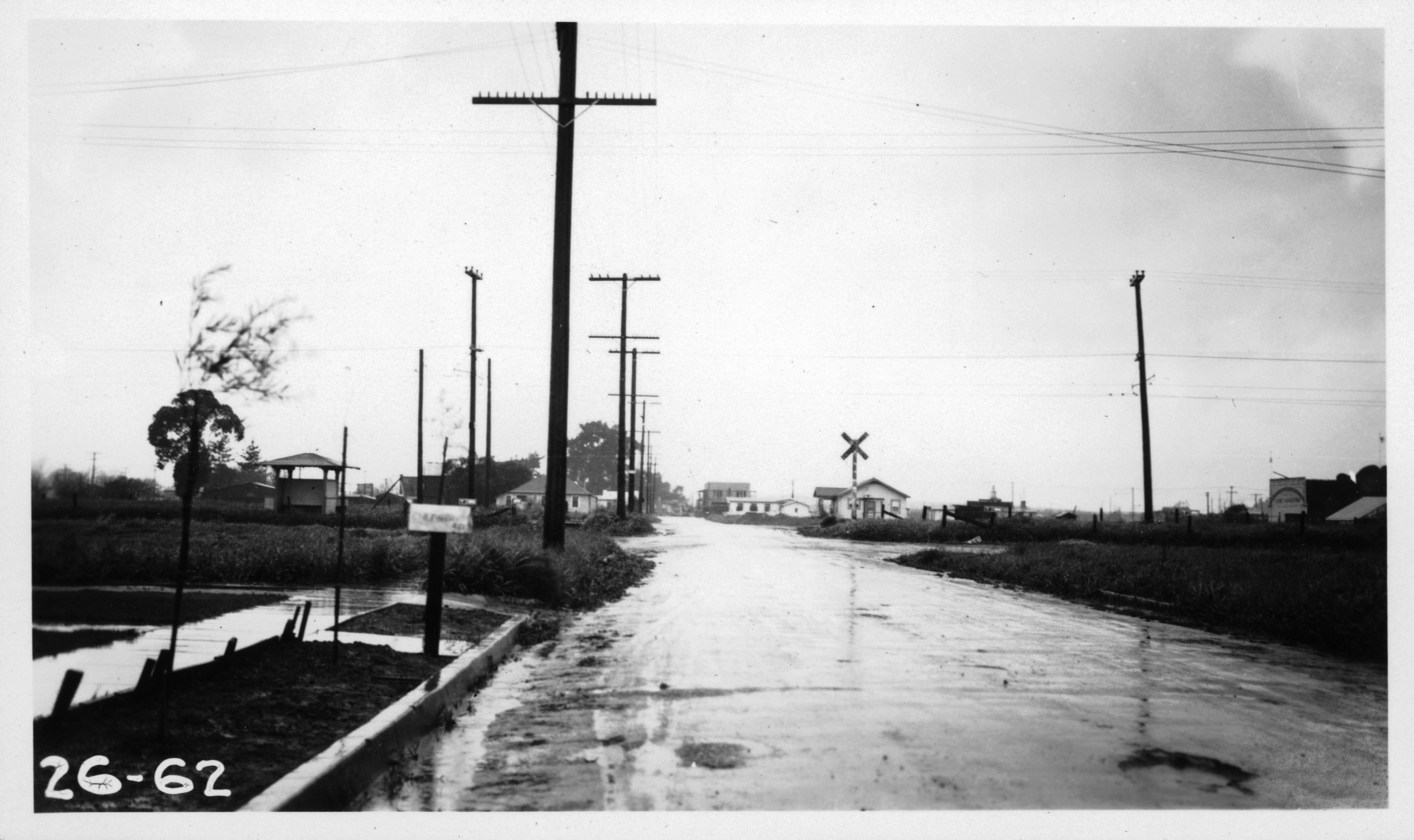
View of Culver Boulevard in 1926, looking north up Berryman Avenue

It was in 1928 that the developers of the planned Palisades Del Rey residential subdivision announced the "widening and permanent paving of the two-mile stretch of Culver Boulevard between Centinela Avenue and Jefferson Boulevard…this will complete the paving on Culver Boulevard, which stretches from Culver City to the ocean."

Photos taken of Culver in 1929 show elaborate street lights installed along the route at that time.

On the occasion of the 1932 Summer Olympics in Los Angeles, the L.A. Times published a guide to Los Angeles' farms for visitors. The guide mentioned that "Venice-Playa Del Rey-Cienega" was a key district for market gardening, especially of summer celery, and mentioned intensive cultivation practices that were getting three or four crops out of the same field in one year. Tourists interested in such a thing were advised to navigate to Culver City, then "turn south and west on Culver Boulevard…a few miles beyond Culver City on this boulevard will bring one to the center of the vegetable district."

Culver Boulevard made occasional brief appearances in Laurel & Hardy and Our Gang shorts produced by the nearby studios.

The streetcar line shut down during the Great Depression and the track was thereafter used for freight until the 1980s. The cities of Los Angeles and Culver City redeveloped the abandoned railroad right-of-way into the Culver Boulevard Median Bike Path in the 1990s.

== Landmarks ==
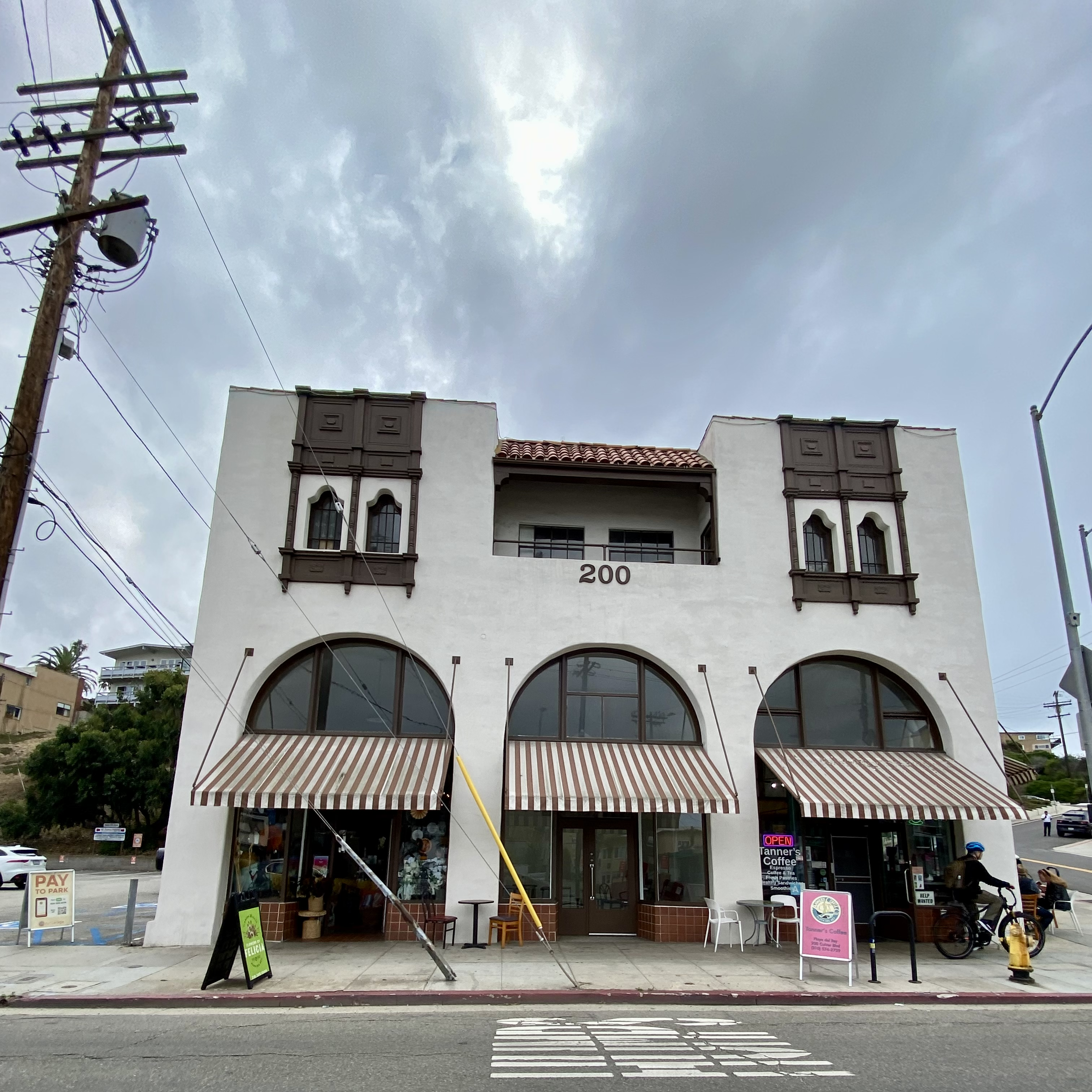
Dickinson & Gillespie building on Culver Boulevard in Playa Del Rey

- Culver Hotel
- Sony Pictures Studios
- Citizen Public Market in the Citizen Publishing Company Building
- Dickinson & Gillespie building in Playa Del Rey
- New Deal-era post office mural inside PWA Moderne Culver City post office
