= Jangala =

Jangala may refer to:

- Jangala (charity), British charity providing internet access to disadvantaged people
- Jangala Desh or Jangladesh, historic region of Rajasthan, India
- Janggala, a former kingdom on Java
- Sweet-Tooth Jangala, a character in the PlayStation 2 port of the 2008 racing video game Speed Racer: The Videogame

== See also ==
- Jangal (disambiguation)
- Jungle (disambiguation)
- Jangla, a village in Punajab, India
- Jangil, an indigenous people of India
