= Jangalak =

Jangalak (Persian: جنگلك) may refer to:

Afghanistan

- Jangalak, Afghanistan

Iran

- Jangal, Khash
- Jangaluk
