= Dickinson & Gillespie building =

1922 structure in Playa Del Rey, Los Angeles

Dickinson & Gillespie Building
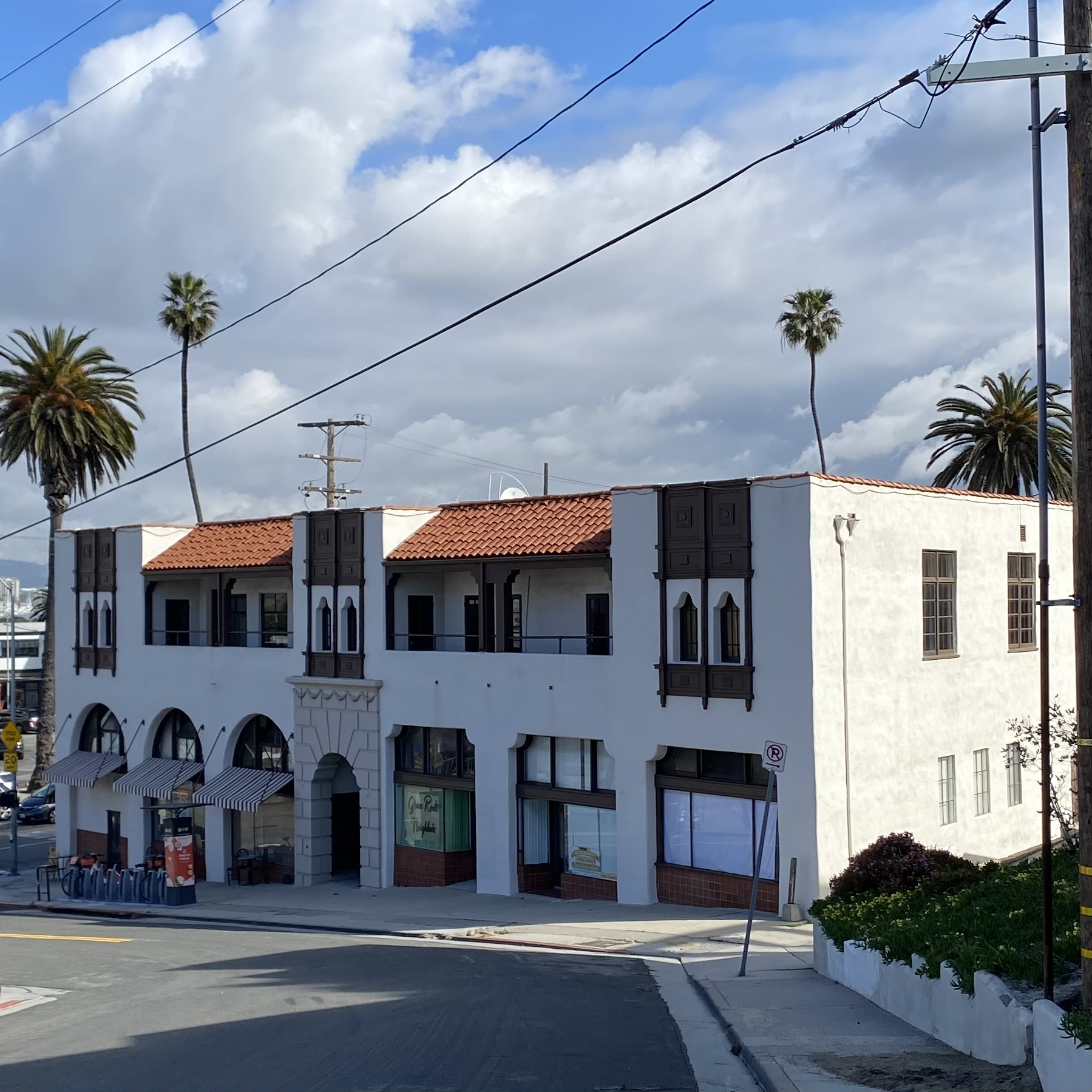
- Dickinson & Gillespie Building, view from Vista Del Mar
- Location: 200 Culver Boulevard; Del Rey, Los Angeles, California; United States
- Coordinates: 33.9588°N 118.4480°W
- Formed: 1925

Los Angeles Historic-Cultural Monument
- Designated: 2009
- Reference no.: 955

The Dickinson and Gillespie Building, is located at 200 Culver Boulevard in downtown Playa Del Rey, California, in the City of Los Angeles. This two-story commercial building, created in 1922, was an extensive remodel of the Hotel Playa, a hotel opened in 1906 on the same site.

The building served at the headquarters of the Dickinson & Gillespie Real Estate Company, a Minneapolis, Minnesota based partnership which relocated here in 1922, and was directed by Fritz Bernard Burns, the General Manager.

The company was responsible for the development of Palisades del Rey, Surfridge and the Del Rey Hills. Part of the Del Rey Hills, today a part of the town of Westchester, was developed as the campus of Loyola University, now Loyola Marymount University. The land for the campus was donated by Harry Culver, father of nearby Culver City, California, and the Blankenthorn Syndicate, controlled by Fritz Burns, and his partners at Dickinson and Gillespie.

The building has been designated as Los Angeles Historic-Cultural Monument No. 955. It was designed (re-designed) by architectural firm of Roth & Parker with a later interior renovation by Parkinson & Parkinson.

The exterior is stucco with terra cotta. The Vista del Mar elevation is divided into five bays with a centered entrance consisting of large arched opening surrounded by a cast concrete frame with a lintel and swag decorative details. The opening is flanked by three arched storefronts with awnings on one section and three rectangular shaped storefronts on the adjacent section. Two of the upper floor bays are inset, creating two balconied sections topped by a sloping tile roof supported by bracketed wood columns and three tower-like bays flush with the ground floor elevation. Each tower-like bay contains paired narrow ogee-shaped windows with rounded apex surrounded by decorative terra-cotta detailing. The smaller Culver Boulevard elevation continues the same design decorative treatment, having three arched storefronts with awnings, centered balconied area, and two tower-like bays with decorative windows. Significant interiors include a vestibule space with decorative molding, and some storefronts with original interior elements.

Dickinson and Gillespie suffered devastating losses as a result of the collapse of the United States economy in 1929, and shortly thereafter vacated the premises. Over the years, the building was occupied by doctors, dentists, a hardware store operation, a surf shop and a bicycle rental stand, just to name a few.

Another notable owner and occupant was graphic designer Robert Miles Runyan who occupied the building in the 1970s-80s. Runyan is recognized for revolutionizing the format and design of corporate reports and designing the “Stars in Motion” logo for the 1984 Summer Olympics in Los Angeles.

Today, Tanner's Coffee Company, and several other tenants, occupy the location.
