= Jangali Maharaj Road =

Jangali Maharaj Road or Jangli Maharaj Road may refer to these roads in India named after the Hindu saint Jangali Maharaj:

- Jangali Maharaj Road, Mumbai
- Jangali Maharaj Road, Pune

== See also ==
- Jangali (disambiguation)
- Maharaj (disambiguation)
