= Jungle (disambiguation) =

A jungle is a dense forest in a tropical climate.

Jungle or The Jungle may also refer to:

== Places ==
=== North America ===
- The Jungle (homeless encampment), formerly in San Jose, California
- Baldwin Village, Los Angeles or The Jungles, a community in California, U.S.
- The Jungle, an area of Playa del Rey, Los Angeles
- The Jungle (Indianapolis), a basketball arena in Indiana, U.S.
- Paul Brown Stadium or The Jungle, a football stadium in Cincinnati, Ohio, U.S.
- The Jungle (Olympia, Washington), a homeless encampment
- The Jungle (Seattle), a greenbelt in Washington, U.S.
- Lawrence Heights or The Jungle, a neighborhood of Toronto, Ontario, Canada

=== Europe ===
- The Jungle (Wheldon Road), a rugby league stadium in Castleford, England
- The Calais jungle, a 2015–2016 refugee and migrant encampment in France

== Art, entertainment and media ==
=== Film ===
- The Jungle (1914 film), a lost film based on the Upton Sinclair novel
- The Jungle (1952 film), an Indian sci-fi film
- The Jungle (1967 film), a 1967 short in the National Film Registry about gangs
- Jungle (2000 film), an Indian Hindi thriller by Ram Gopal Varma
- Jungle (2017 film), an Australian film

=== Games ===
- Jungle (board game), a traditional Chinese game
- Jungle (console), a canceled Panasonic video game console announced in 2010
- "Jungle", a Pokémon Trading Card Game set
- Jungle, uncharted areas in multiplayer online battle arenas

=== Literature ===
- The Jungle, a 1906 novel by Upton Sinclair
- The Jungle, a 1991 novel by David Drake
- The Jungle (Cussler novel), 2011, by Clive Cussler and Jack Du Brul

=== Music ===
- Jungle music, an electronic music genre and precursor to drum and bass
- Jungle (band), a British modern-soul band
- Jungle (rapper) (Jabari Jones), a member of Bravehearts (active 1998–2008)
- Jungle Records, a British record label

==== Albums ====
- Jungle (Astrud Gilberto album), 2002
- Jungle (Jungle album), 2014
- Jungle, a 2009 album by Makoto Ozone
- Jungle, a 1984 album by Dwight Twilley
- The Jungle, a compilation album by B.B. King

==== Songs ====
- "Jungle" (A Boogie wit da Hoodie song), 2016
- "Jungle" (Drake song), 2015
- "Jungle" (Electric Light Orchestra song), 1977
- "Jungle" (Emma Louise song), 2011
- "Jungle" (Fred Again song), 2022
- "Jungle" (Kiss song), 1997
- "Jungle" (Professor Green song), 2011
- "Jungle" (Sugababes song), 2025
- "Jungle" (Taiji song), 2000
- "Jungle" (X Ambassadors and Jamie N Commons song), 2013
- "Jungle", a song by Bliss n Eso from Circus in the Sky, 2013
- "Jungle", a song by the Cat Empire from Cities, 2006
- "Jungle", a song by Frente! from Shape, 1996
- "Jungle", a song by Ivy Queen from Drama Queen, 2007
- "Jungle", a song by Re-Flex from The Politics of Dancing, 1983
- "The Jungle", a 1967 song by B.B. King from the album of the same name
- "The Jungle", a 2009 song by Phinehas from their self-titled EP
- "Jungles", a 2010 song by Stepdad from Ordinaire EP

=== Television ===
- Jungle (British TV series), 2022
- Jungle (Pakistani TV series), 1986
- "The Jungle" (The Killing), a 2013 episode
- "The Jungle" (The Twilight Zone), a 1961 episode
- "Jungles" (Planet Earth II), a 2016 episode
- Jungle, a 2003 documentary series presented by Charlotte Uhlenbroek
- "Jungles", an episode of the game show QI
- "Jungle", an episode of The Mighty Boosh

=== Other uses in art, entertainment and media ===
- "The Jungle", alternative name for The Jim Rome Show, a sports radio talk show
- The Jungle (play), 2017, by Joe Robertson and Joe Murphy
- Jungle Phillips, Australian artist (1956–2025)

== See also ==
- Jungle style, a method of carrying gun ammunition
- "Jungle" Jim Steele, early stage name for professional wrestler James Rocha (born 1967)
- Jangal (disambiguation)
- Jangala (disambiguation)
- Junglee (disambiguation)
- The Jungle Book (disambiguation)
