= Junglee =

Junglee may refer to:

- Junglee (1961 film), an Indian film
- Junglee (2009 film), a Kannada-language Indian film
- Junglee (2019 film), a Hindi-language Indian film
- Junglee.com, a defunct e-commerce website by Amazon.com
- Junglee Music, an Indian music label by Times Music
- Junglee Pictures, an Indian film company, established 2014

== See also ==
- Jungle (disambiguation)
- Jangali (disambiguation)
- Jongli, a 2025 Bangladeshi action drama film
