= Jingle Jangle =

Jingle Jangle or jingle-jangle may refer to:

== Music ==
- Jangle, a sound associated with 12-string electric guitars

=== Songs ===
- "Jingle Jangle", a 1955 song by the Penguins
- "Jingle Jingle Jingle", a 1964 song from Rudolph the Red-Nosed Reindeer
- "Jingle Jangle", a 1966 song by the Bee Gees
- "Jingle Jangle", a 1969 song by the fictional group The Archies
- "Jingle Jangle", a 1969 song by the Troggs from the album From Nowhere
- "Jingle Jangle", a 1969 song by Manuela
- "Jingle Jangle", a 2003 song by Hieroglyphics from the album Full Circle
- "Jingle Jangle", a 2005 song by Hot Hot Heat from the album Elevator

=== Album ===
- Jingle Jangle (The Archies album), a 1969 album by The Archies

== Television and film ==
- "Ed, Edd n Eddy's Jingle Jingle Jangle", TV episode of "Ed, Edd n Eddy"
- Jingle Jangle (film), 2020 film

== Miscellaneous ==
- Jingle Jangle Comics
- Jingle-jangle fallacies
- The sound of bells

== See also ==
- "Jingle Jangle Jingle", a 1942 song
- "Mr. Tambourine Man", a song by Bob Dylan which contains the phrase "jingle-jangle morning"
- Jingle (disambiguation)
- Jangle (disambiguation)
