= Jangle (disambiguation) =

Jangle is a sound associated with 12-string electric guitars.

Jangle or jangling may also refer to:

- Jangle pop, music genre
- Jangle Leg, a character from the 1999 film Life
- Jangletown, a comic collection also known as The Further Adventures of The Joker
- Jangling verse, a derogatory term for Leonine verse.
- Ola & the Janglers, Swedish pop band
- Jangles, a fictional clown character in 2015 Pixar's Inside Out

== See also ==
- Jingle Jangle (disambiguation)
- Jangal (disambiguation)
