= Dockweiler State Beach =

State beach in Los Angeles County, California, United States

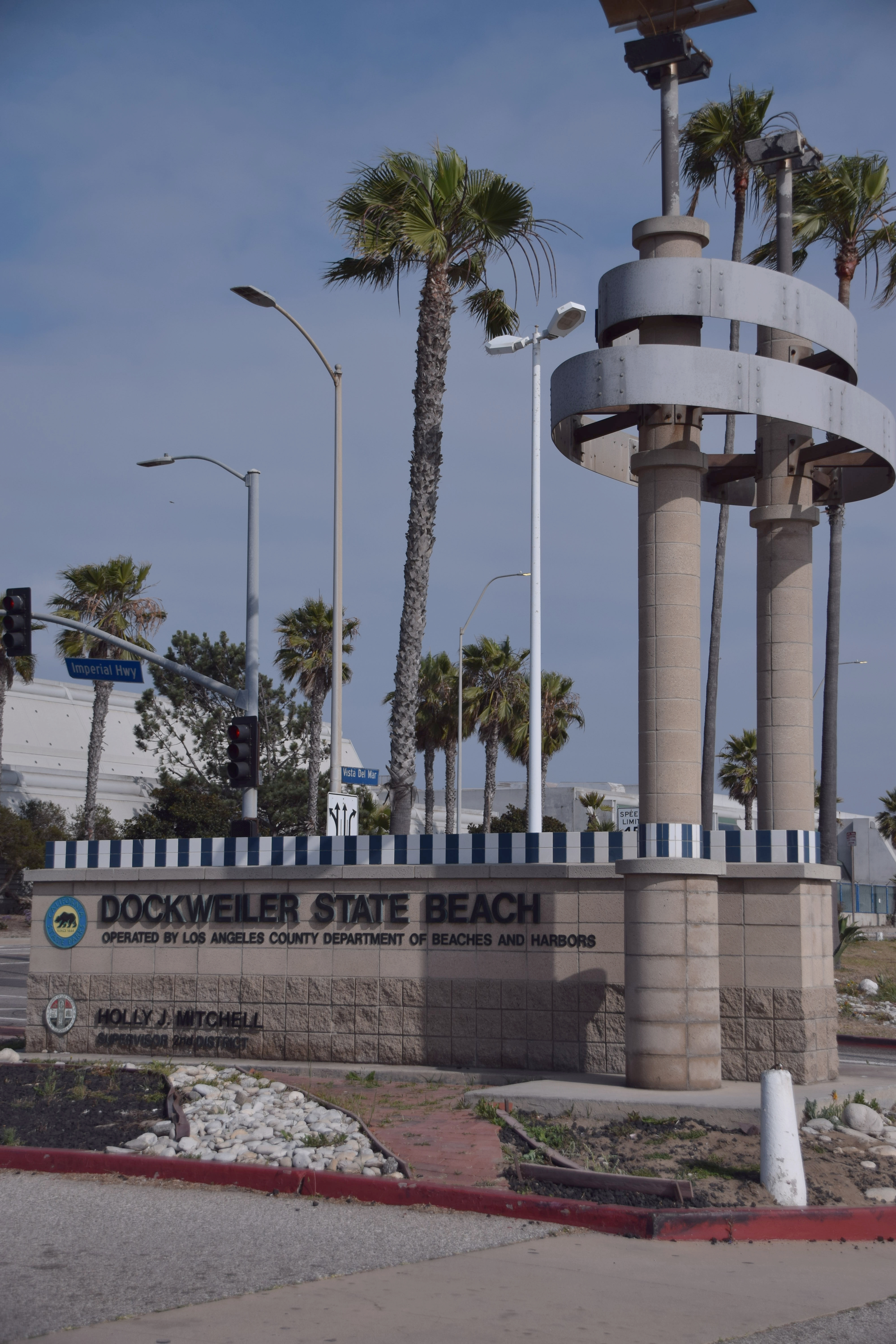
- State Beach Sign

- Location within the Los Angeles metropolitan area Location within California Location within the United States
- Interactive map of Dockweiler State Beach
- Location: Los Angeles County, California, United States
- Nearest city: Los Angeles, California
- Coordinates: 33°55′20″N 118°26′3″W
- Area: 91 acres (37 ha)
- Established: 1948
- Governing body: California Department of Parks and Recreation

Dockweiler State Beach, known locally as Dockweiler, is a beach in Los Angeles, California, with 3.75 miles (6.04 km) of shoreline, and a hang gliding practice and training area. Although a unit of the California state park system, it is managed by the Los Angeles County Department of Beaches and Harbors. Part of the park is located directly under the flight path of the adjacent Los Angeles International Airport (LAX). The 91-acre (37 ha) property was established in 1948. Originally part of Venice-Hyperion Beach State Park, it was renamed in honor of prominent early Angeleno Isidore B. Dockweiler in 1955.

== Location ==
Dockweiler State Beach is in the Playa del Rey neighborhood at the western terminus of Imperial Highway. Between the beach and the airport lies the ghost town of Palisades del Rey.

In August 2000 parkgoers witnessed smoke and flames shooting out of a Boeing 747's engine and metal parts as large as a dishwasher landing on the beach. The KLM flight bound for Amsterdam had just taken off from LAX and suffered a possible bird strike in one of its four jet engines. The aircraft was able to circle and land again without injury to the 429 people aboard.

== Hang gliding ==
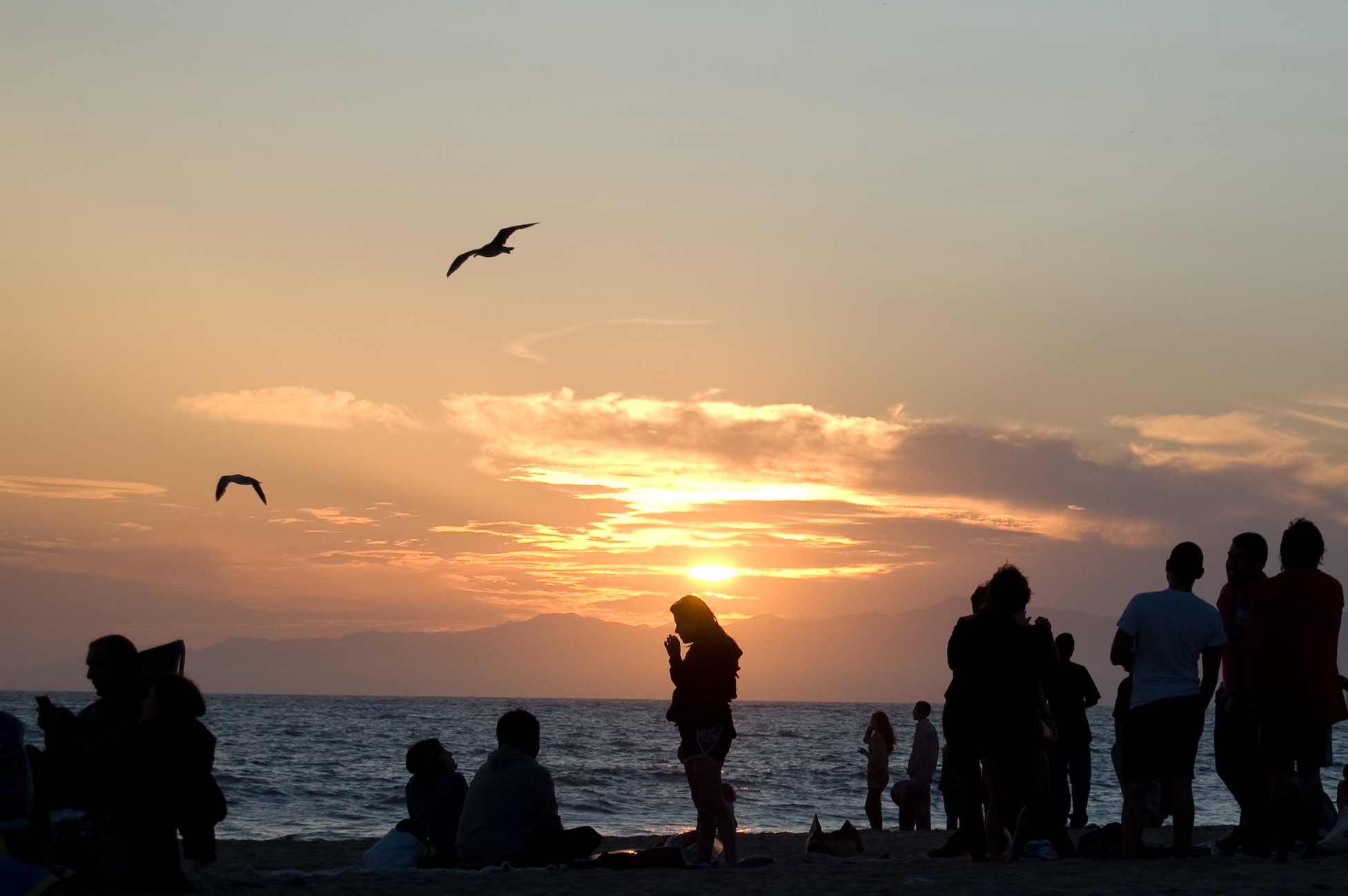
Sunset on Dockweiler State Beach

The park boasts of the Dockweiler Hang Gliding Center and the Hang Gliding Flight Training Concession; where beginners can learn the sport of hang gliding; experienced hang glider enthusiasts may practice the art and sport as the plaque set in 2000 at the site indicates. Enthusiasts and students of the concession launch off 25-foot-high (7.6 m) dunes. The facility was built by the city, county, and state; to serve lesson-and-renting needs. A concession is operated by a concession named WindSports International, Inc. under a limited contract. With gentle breezes and a broad, sandy landing zone, Dockweiler was a major testing ground for hang gliding pioneers in the 1960s. Concerned about safety and liability, however, city officials banned the sport at the beach in 1986. Practitioners lobbied for 13 years to reopen Dockweiler to hang gliding, ultimately winning a $6 million renovation in 2000 that included the Dockweiler Hang Gliding Center. It was the first hang gliding park established in conjunction with a city government. Friends of Dockweiler Gliding Society (FDGS) was founded at the 2015 Otto Lilienthal Birthday Party sponsored by the US Hawks Hang Gliding Association; the FDGS is a non-profit organization dedicated to preserving the park's gliding activity for the public.

== Bicycle path ==
The Dockweiler State Beach bicycle path is maintained by the Los Angeles Department of Transportation. It runs from Ballona Creek to the El Segundo city limit. Bike Path ID: 22. Mileage: 3.79. This bicycle path connects to the Ballona Creek bicycle path at its northernmost point and is part of the 22-mile coastal Marvin Braude Bike Trail system.

== Use ==
One of the few beaches in Los Angeles County where bonfires are permitted, it is popular for barbecues and picnics.

== Wildlife ==
Snowy Plovers nest on the beach.

== See also ==
- List of beaches in California
- List of California state parks
