= Jingle (disambiguation) =

A jingle is a memorable slogan, set to an engaging melody, mainly broadcast on radio and sometimes on television commercials.

Jingle or jingles may also refer to:

== Music ==
- Jingle (percussion), one of a group of small discs or bells in a percussion instrument
- Jingle bell, a small bell of the type mentioned in the song
- "Jingle Bells", a popular Christmas song
- Jingles (album), a 2002 album by Australian band Regurgitator
- "Jingles", a song by Wes Montgomery on the 1959 album The Wes Montgomery Trio
- Jingles (1998), Jingles 2 (2005), and Jingles 3 (2012), albums by a cappella group Voice Male

== Other uses ==
- Jingle (carriage), a covered carriage formerly used in Cork, Ireland
- Jingle (protocol), a VoIP extension to the extensible Messaging and presence protocol
- Jingle Belle, a cartoon character created by Paul Dini
- Jingle County, in Shanxi, China
- Jingle Ma, Hong Kong writer and director
- Jingle Island, island in Antarctica
- Jingle Magazine, a Filipino magazine; see Roxlee
- Jingle (song), 1970 song by Almendra (band)
- "Jingle, Jingle, Jingle", an episode of the children's television series Shining Time Station
- One of several species of mollusk in the family Anomiidae, genus Anomia
- Jingles, a character portrayed by actor Andy Devine in the 1950s American television western series The Adventures of Wild Bill Hickok

== See also ==
- Jingle Jangle (disambiguation)
