= Jangali, Kerman =

Jangali جنگلي
- Village
- Location within Iran
- Coordinates: 27°13′12″N 58°33′40″E
- Country: Iran
- Province: Kerman
- County: Qaleh Ganj
- Bakhsh: Chah Dadkhoda
- Rural District: Chah Dadkhoda

Population (2006)
  - Total: 214
- Time zone: UTC+3:30 (IRST)
  - Summer (DST): UTC+4:30 (IRDT)

Jangali (Persian: جنگلي, also Romanized as Jangalī) is a village in Chah Dadkhoda Rural District, Chah Dadkhoda District, Qaleh Ganj County, Kerman Province, Iran. At the 2006 census, its population was 214, in 50 families.
