= Kalat-e Jangal =

Kalat-e Jangal كلات جنگل
- Village
- Location within Iran
- Coordinates: 31°38′42″N 59°21′54″E
- Country: Iran
- Province: South Khorasan
- County: Nehbandan
- Bakhsh: Central
- Rural District: Meyghan

Population (2006)
  - Total: 55
- Time zone: UTC+3:30 (IRST)
  - Summer (DST): UTC+4:30 (IRDT)

Kalat-e Jangal (Persian: كلات جنگل, also Romanized as Kalāt-e Jangal; also known as Jangal and Kalāteh-ye Jangal) is a village in Meyghan Rural District, in the Central District of Nehbandan County, South Khorasan Province, Iran. At the 2006 census, its population was 55, in 15 families.
