= Jangal, Qasr-e Qand =

Jangal جنگل
- Village
- Location within Iran
- Coordinates: 26°17′37″N 60°43′56″E
- Country: Iran
- Province: Sistan and Baluchestan
- County: Qasr-e Qand
- Bakhsh: Central
- Rural District: Holunchekan

Population (2006)
  - Total: 197
- Time zone: UTC+3:30 (IRST)
  - Summer (DST): UTC+4:30 (IRDT)

Jangal (Persian: جنگل; also known as Shāhābād) is a village in Holunchekan Rural District in the Central District of Qasr-e Qand County, Sistan and Baluchestan Province, Iran. At the 2006 census, its population was 197, in 32 families.
