= Playa del Rey, Los Angeles =

Playa del Rey Palisades Del Rey
- Neighborhood of Los Angeles
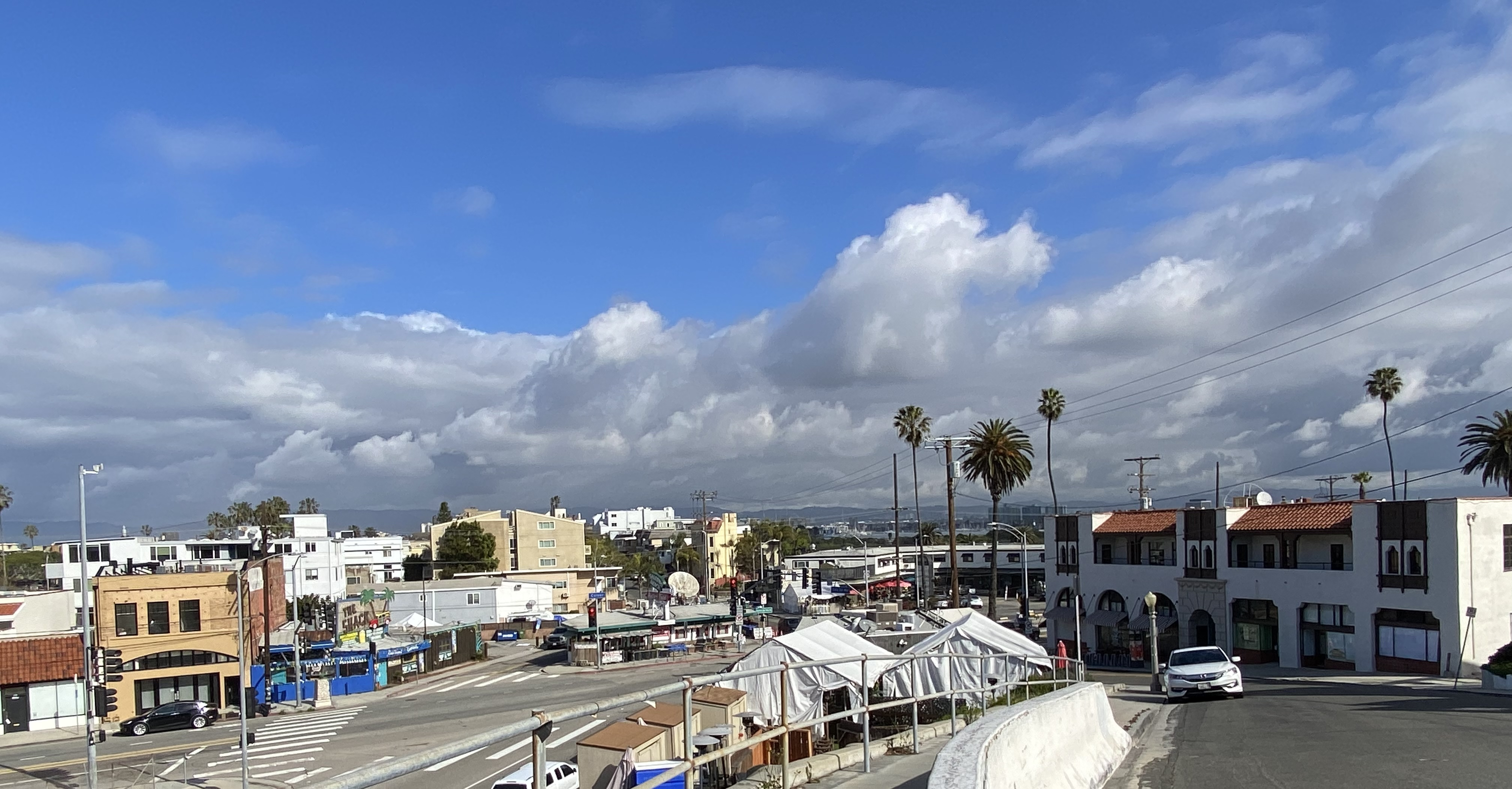
- Playa Del Rey retail district, intersection of Culver Boulevard and Vista Del Mar

- Location within Southern Los Angeles Location within the Los Angeles metropolitan area Location within California Location within the United States
- Coordinates: 33°57′25″N 118°26′10″W
- Country: United States
- State: California
- County: Los Angeles
- City: Los Angeles

Playa del Rey (Spanish for "Beach of the King") is a seaside neighborhood on the westside of Los Angeles in the Santa Monica Bay region of Los Angeles County, California. It has a ZIP Code of 90293 and area codes of 310 and 424. As of 2018, the community had a population of 16,230 people.

== History ==
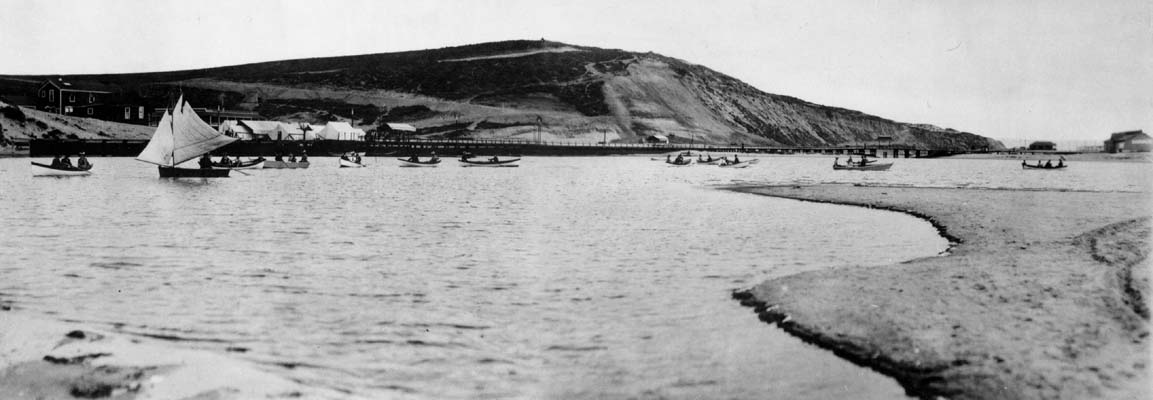
Playa del Rey: Ballona Wetlands and Creek, 1902

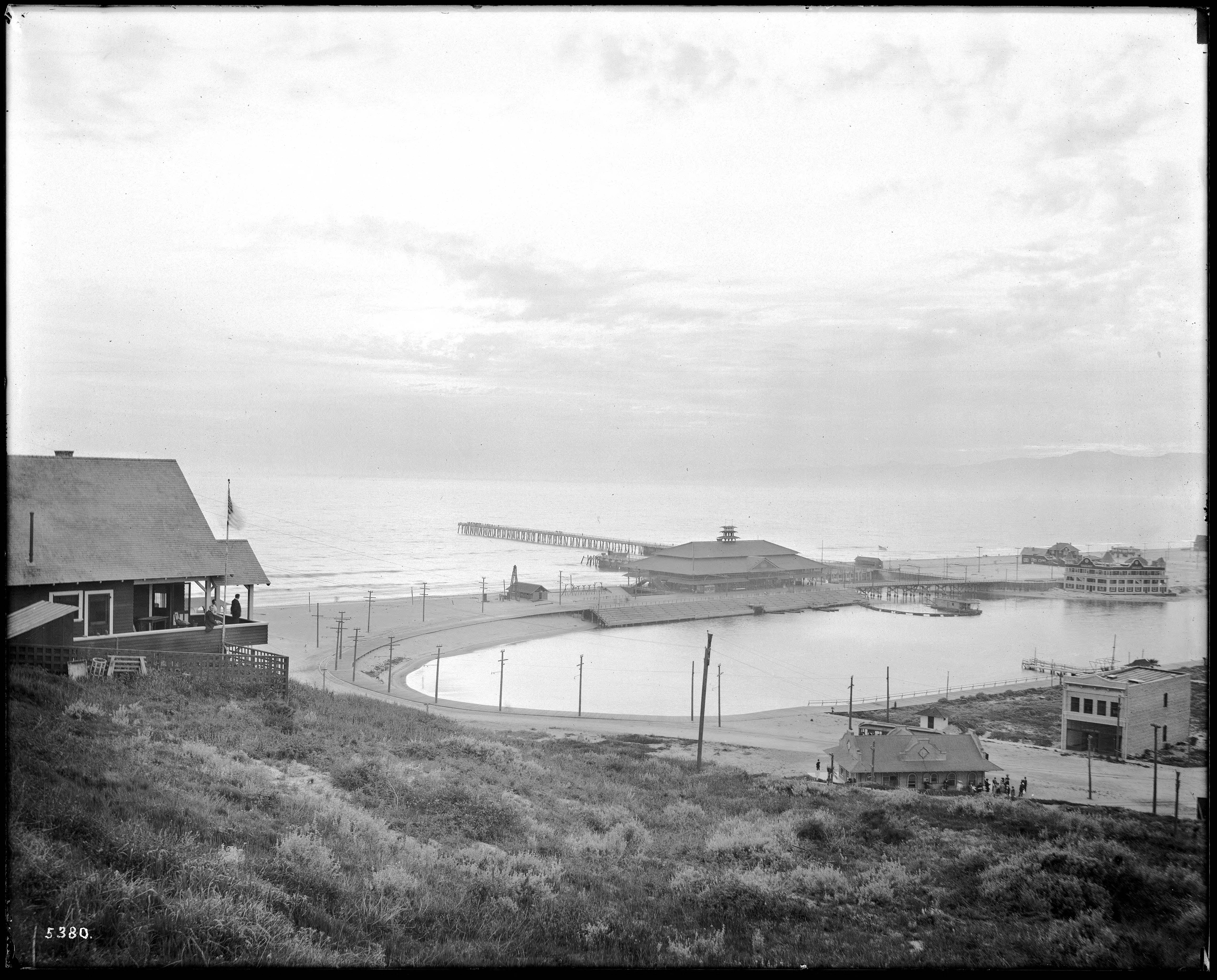
Playa del Rey lagoon, hotel, pavilion and pier, c. 1908

Lower Playa del Rey was originally wetlands and sand dune soil, but natural flooding was halted by levees made of earthen soil, boulders and reinforced concrete with a soft-bottom submerged soil that promotes both tidal flow in good weather and facilitated the flow of freshwater into the ocean in rainy weather, resulting in a dynamic estuarine river known as Ballona Creek.

The wetlands area were inhabited by the Tongva came to the wetlands three to five thousand years ago. The area was important for fishing and shellfish harvesting. The usage of wooden plank boats known as te'aats were used to paddle out to the Channel Islands. Guashna was the major village in the area and was an important regional trade center.

In the 1870s, Playa Del Rey was the location of the first attempt at a dredged harbor in Santa Monica Bay. Under contract with the Atchison, Topeka & Santa Fe Railroad, Moye Wicks' syndicate spent $300,000 to dredge Port Ballona Harbor, for shipping to the Orient. Within three years, winter waves brought flooding, but what remained of man's early efforts became the Del Rey Lagoon, now a municipal public park.

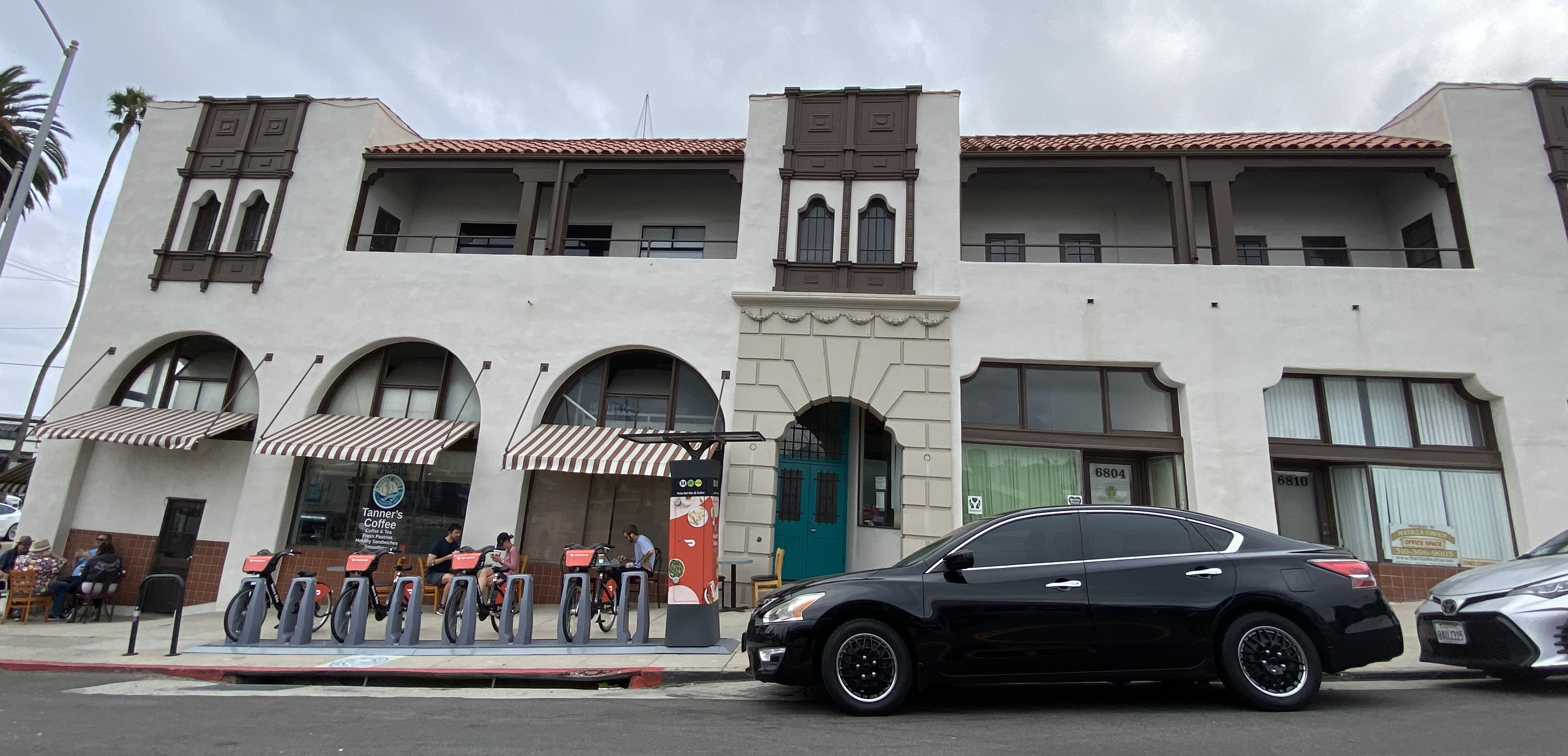
The historic Dickinson & Gillespie building, built in 1922 in a Spanish Colonial Revival style.

In 1902, buyers interested in land at the new Playa Del Rey development were instructed to travel by streetcar to Alla Station where “tally-hos” awaited them. The new development eventually got its own streetcar stop on the Redondo Beach via Playa del Rey Line beginning from the Ivy Station. In 1910, the Playa del Rey Motordome was built, the first board track in the world; it was used for bike and also early auto racing.

Palisades del Rey was the name of the original 1921 neighborhood land development by Dickinson & Gillespie Co. that later came to be called Playa del Rey. The company advertised this area of sand dunes as the last stretch of coastal land in the city of Los Angeles to be developed. All of the houses in this area were custom built, many as beach homes owned by Hollywood actors and producers, including Cecil B. Demille, Charles Bickford, and others.

Construction in Playa del Rey surged in 1928 with the development of the Del Rey Hills neighborhood in the Eastern part of the community (to the East of Pershing Drive), and the move of Loyola University (now Loyola Marymount University) to the adjacent community of Westchester.

The southern portion of the original Playa del Rey development, which came to be known as Surfridge, is now vacant. Between 1966 and 1975, the houses that were once there were either moved or demolished to facilitate the expansion of Los Angeles International Airport (LAX) and to address concerns about the noise of increasing jet plane traffic. The noise from the flights made it less desirable to live on the dunes above the ocean under the LAX flight path. The City of Los Angeles condemned the southern section of Playa del Rey under the power of eminent domain and purchased all of the homes. Today, one can see only barbed-wire fences protecting vacant land and old streets where houses once sat. Recent LAX rejuvenation plans call for the city to finally remove the old streets that still line the empty neighborhood. The condemned areas of the community are now a protected habitat of the endangered El Segundo blue butterfly.

Playa del Rey in the 1950s and early 1960s was known as a great Los Angeles area surf spot, but due to the many rock jetties that were built to prevent beach erosion, the good surf has mostly disappeared. The construction of Marina Del Rey, which involved the hardening of the Ballona Creek mouth and the addition of a massive breakwater shielding the harbor from ocean storms, dramatically altered wave patterns in the area. Compared to other nearby beaches, the areas immediately North and South of the Marina Breakwater are steeply sloped and waves tend to crash in very shallow water very close to shore. The beach at the northernmost end of Playa del Rey is still known as Toes Over Beach, Toes Beach, or just "Toes" by the local surfing community, a name derived from the toes-over or hang ten surfing maneuver. Most surfers now flock south of Dockweiler Beach to El Porto (the northernmost part of beach in the city of Manhattan Beach) or north of Marina del Rey to Venice Beach. The lifeguard and park services are uniform across the entire 20-mile (32 km) stretch of beach.

One danger for beachgoers is the uncontrolled water runoff from the creek, and the occasional emergency overflow from the giant Hyperion treatment plant to the south. Under normal conditions, the plant discharges treated water 5 miles (8.0 km) out to sea, but a rarely used one-mile (1.6 km) outflow pipe exists for emergencies or during maintenance. Wastewater discharged from this shorter pipe is close enough to shore to severely impact beach conditions when it is in use.

Locals refer to the small area of housing closest to the beach, where Culver Boulevard joins Vista del Mar, as "The Jungle," a nickname given to a group of closely built 1956 apartments bounded by Trolley Place and Trolleyway Street on its east and west respectively, and including the streets Fowling, Rees, Sunridge and Surf. The small sidewalks between homes had/have deep green overgrowth, which added to the name.

Today, the Pacific Avenue Bridge between Playa Del Rey and the jetty between Ballona Creek and the Marina is accessible to foot traffic and bicycle traffic, but not to automobiles. Bikers, skaters and joggers can cross this bridge to continue north to Santa Monica, and to the South Bay. It is the only pedestrian crossing over Ballona Creek between the ocean and Centinela Avenue, and the Lincoln Boulevard and Marina Freeway bridges both lack sidewalks.

Both the University of California, Los Angeles and Loyola Marymount University have crew teams that practice on the Ballona Creek channel and in Marina del Rey.

== Geography ==
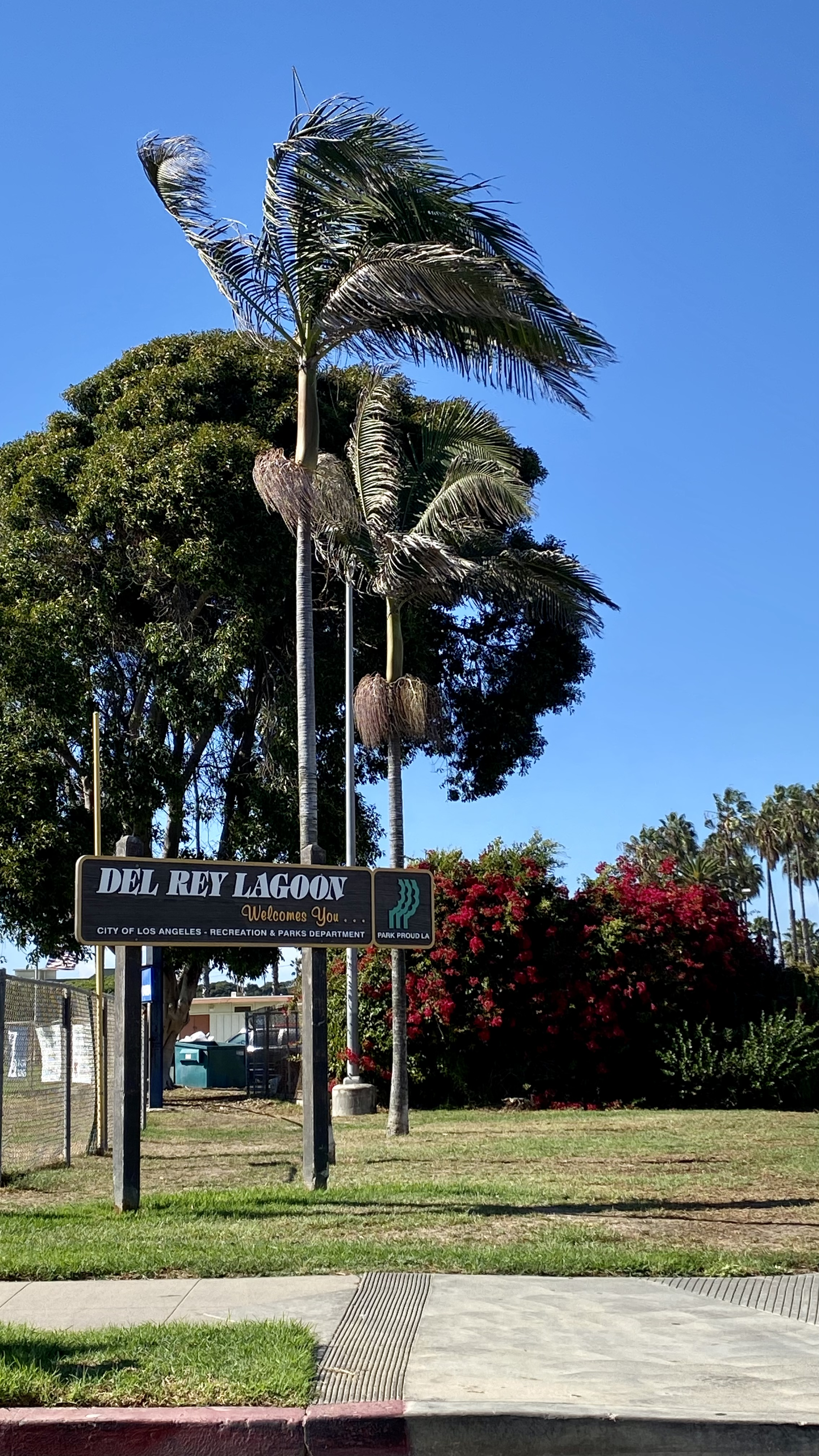
Del Rey Lagoon Park sign, Playa Del Rey, Los Angeles

Considered part of Silicon Beach, Playa del Rey is a coastal neighborhood and a district of the city of Los Angeles. Its location immediately north of Los Angeles International Airport exposes some residents to air and noise pollution generated at the airport. Over the years, expansions at the airport have forced more than a thousand residents to move and hundreds of houses to be demolished.

The community is bordered by the Pacific Ocean to the west, Marina del Rey and Ballona Creek to the north, the Ballona Wetlands and Playa Vista to the northeast, Westchester to the east, and Los Angeles International Airport and El Segundo to the south.

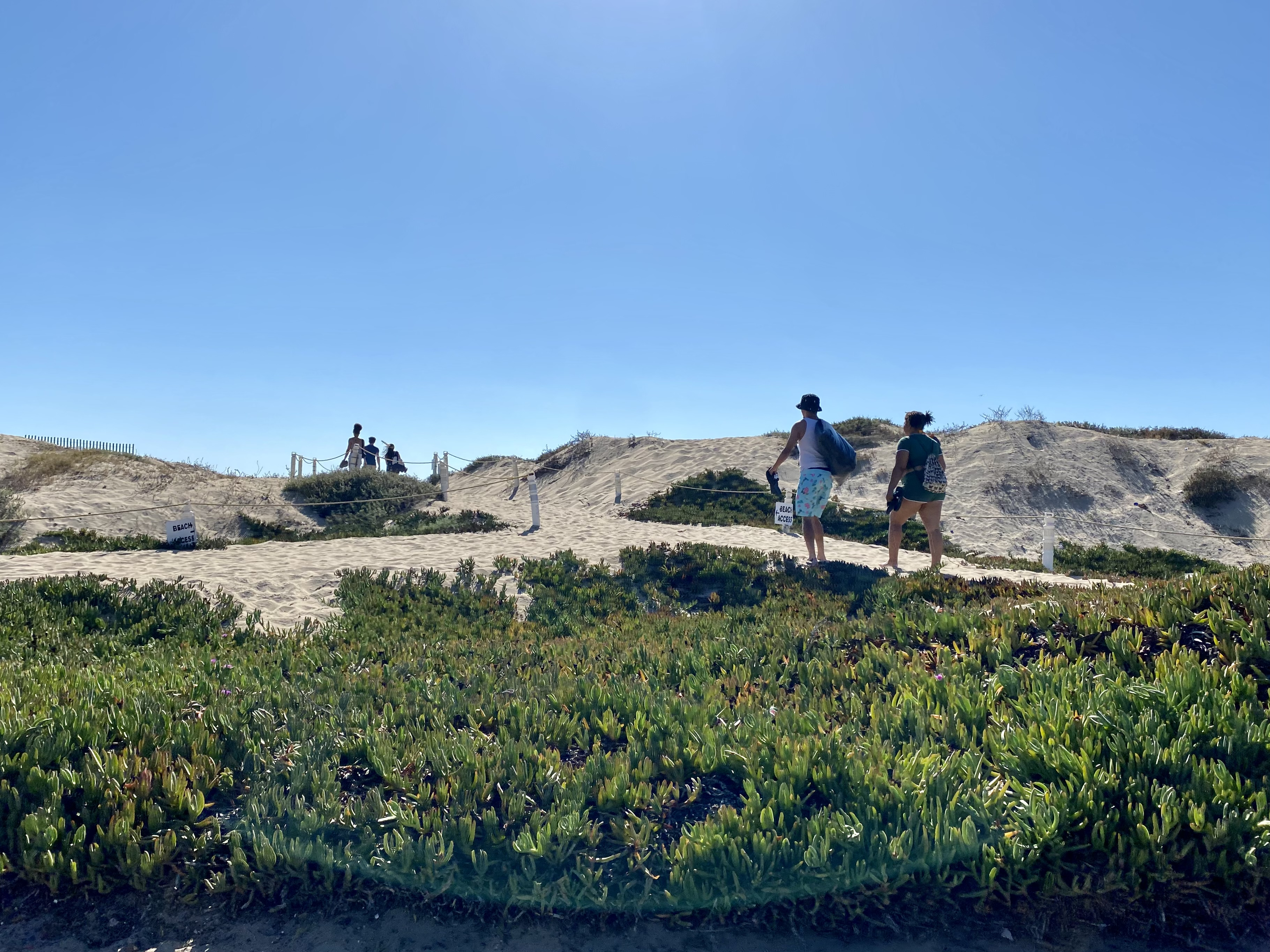
Sand dunes and beach access at Playa Del Rey, California

The city of Los Angeles has three small parks in Playa del Rey: Del Rey Lagoon Park, the .5-acre (2,000 m^{2}) Titmouse Park, and Vista Del Mar Park. Del Rey Lagoon Park, which has an area of about 14 acres (57,000 m^{2}), also has a shallow saltwater swamp-pond known as Del Rey Lagoon. The pond has an area of about 5 acres (20,000 m^{2}), with a maximum depth of about five ft (1.5 m). The lagoon’s depth varies over time of day, as it is partially connected with the Ballona Creek by an underground pipe. The park is bounded by Ballona Creek to the north, Convoy Street to the south, Pacific Avenue to the west, and Esplanade and an apartment complex to the east.

Playa del Rey's rolling hills and depression wetland ponds are the result of ancient, wind-blown, compacted sand dunes that rise up to 125 feet (38 m) above sea level, originally called and often referred to as The Del Rey Hills or "The Bluffs." These dunes run parallel to the coastline, from Playa del Rey, all the way south to Palos Verdes.

== Demographics ==
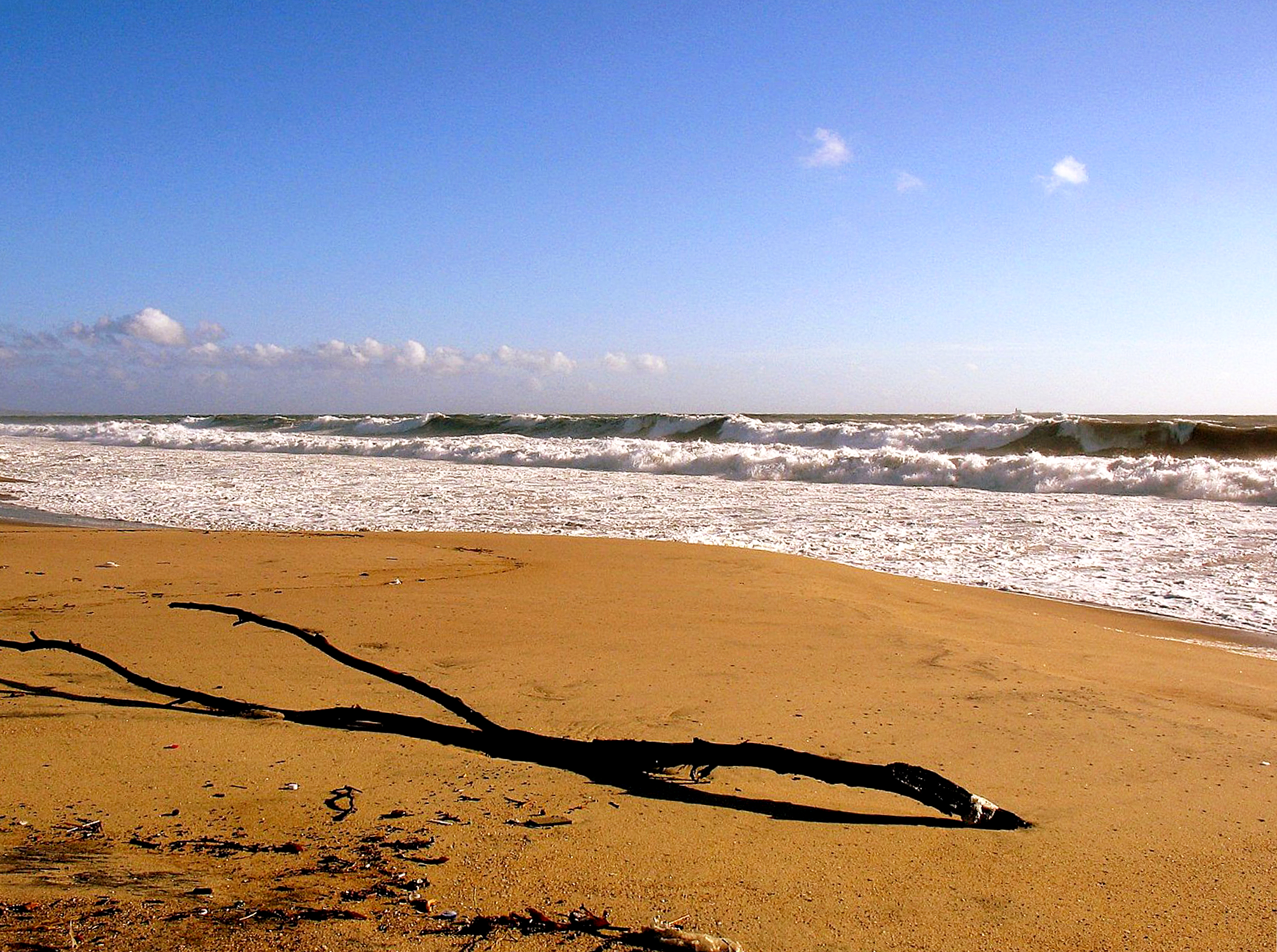
Beach at Playa del Rey

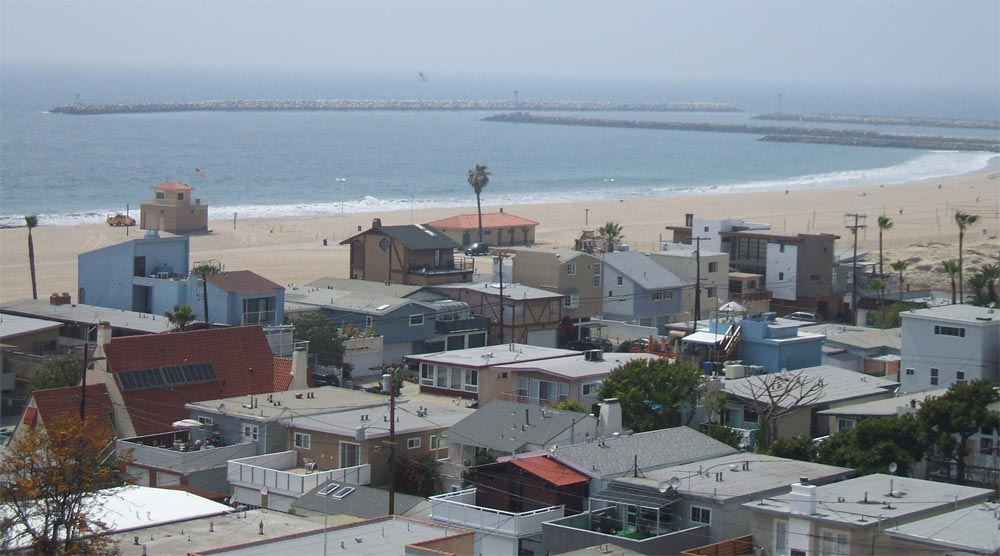
Overlooking the entrance to the marina and Ballona Creek, with the tightly packed area known as The Jungle in the foreground.

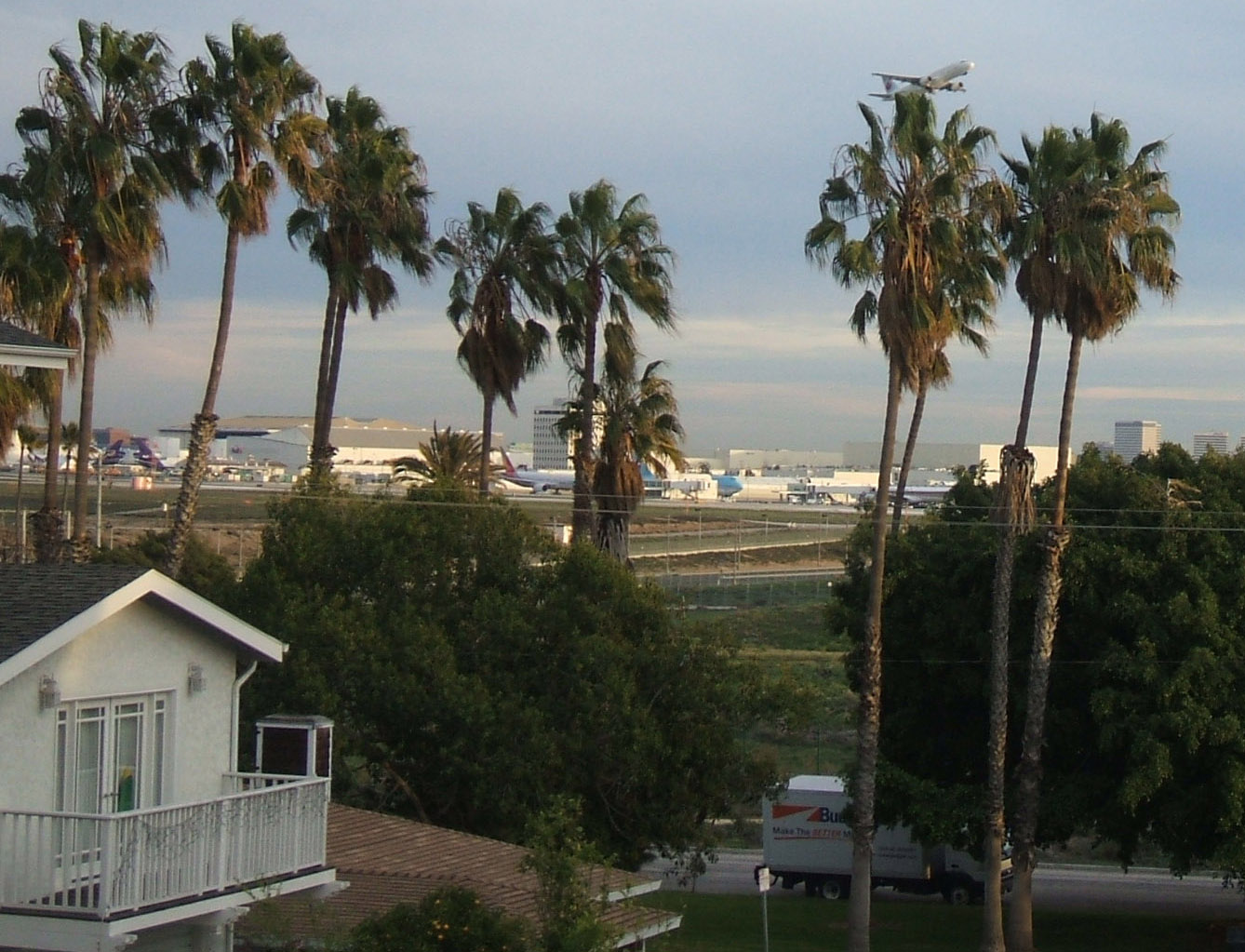
The community's proximity to LAX has made airport expansion a controversial issue to residents.

According to data from the Los Angeles Times's "Mapping L.A." project, the area's demography was 72.6% Non-Hispanic White, 7.7% Asian, 3.9% Black, 10.0% Latino and 5.8% of other backgrounds.

Of employed Playa Del Rey residents, 94.7% work in a white-collar profession. 65.6% of all residents 25 years of age or older have at least a bachelor's degree, and 39.8% of residents have obtained a graduate-level education or more. As of 2021, the median price for a single family home in the 90293 zip code has exceeded $3 million, and the average income is $148,296, which is among the wealthiest in Los Angeles.

== Economy ==
As Playa del Rey is located in the heart of the Silicon Beach, the economy has become largely driven by the tech sector. The neighborhood is also home to a large number of airline and aerospace employees, owing to its proximity to LAX. The vast majority of land in Playa del Rey is zoned for residential purposes only. It is known for its large ocean-view estates, but the bulk of the population lives in the eastern portion, which is densely developed with apartment and condominium complexes. Only portions of Manchester Avenue, Pershing Drive and Culver Boulevard have businesses—mainly restaurants and a pharmacy—and offices mixed in with residential buildings.

== Government and infrastructure ==
Los Angeles Fire Department Station 5 (Westchester/LAX Area) is in the area.

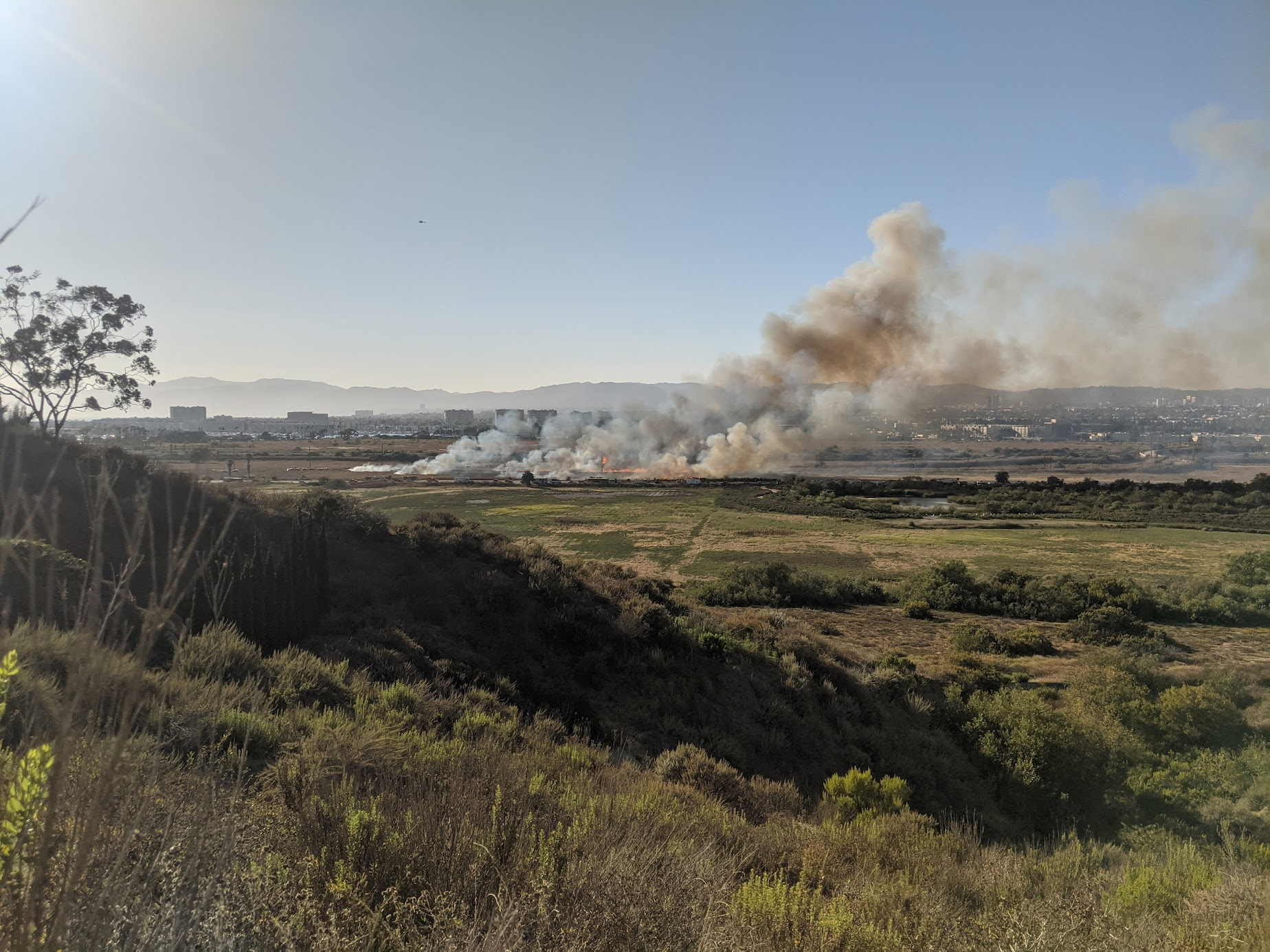
A brush fire near Loyola Marymount University. With help of air support, the fire was put out a few minutes later.

Los Angeles Police Department operates the Pacific Community Police Station at 12312 Culver Boulevard, 90066, serving the neighborhood.

The Los Angeles County Department of Health Services SPA 5 West Area Health Office serves Playa del Rey.

Playa del Rey lies entirely within the 11th council district of Los Angeles, and is represented on the city council by Traci Park.

== Education ==
Playa del Rey is within the Los Angeles Unified School District. The area is within Board District 4. As of 2009, Steve Zimmer represents the district.

Notable schools in the area include Westchester Enriched Sciences Magnets (6–8) and St. Bernard High School, a private Roman Catholic school.

As of 2014, the Wiseburn School District allows parents in Playa del Rey to send their children to Wiseburn schools on inter-district transfers.

== Notable people ==
- Roseanne Barr, actress, comedian, former Presidential candidate
- Charles Bickford, film and TV actor, primarily in the 1940s-1950s
- Mel Blanc, voice actor, comedian, and musician. In the 1940s he resided on Ellen Avenue, now absorbed by LAX.
- Jerry Buss, former owner of the Los Angeles Lakers
- Jamaal Wilkes, UCLA and Los Angeles Lakers Hall of Famer
- Bruce Campbell, actor
- William J. Dodd, architect
- Dave Draper, bodybuilder and television host
- Sam Elliott, actor
- Anthony Michael Hall, actor
- Phil Jackson, former coach of the Los Angeles Lakers
- Anissa Jones, actress
- Noel Jones, bishop
- Laura Karpman, composer
- Jack Kruschen, actor
- Patrick Long, racing driver
- Benny Mardones, singer/songwriter
- William C. deMille, film director
- Sugar Shane Mosley, former World Champion boxer
- Lenda Murray, IFBB professional bodybuilder
- Taylour Paige, dancer and actress
- Tara Reid, actress and pop culture figure
- Dawn Robinson, original member of the group En Vogue
- Carroll Shelby, auto designer
- Carmen Twillie, actress/singer
- Donda West, late mother of hip-hop artist Kanye West

== See also ==
- Ballona Lagoon, separated twin of Del Rey Lagoon
- Hope Development School fire (1924)
