= Citizen Publishing Company Building =

- U.S. National Register of Historic Places
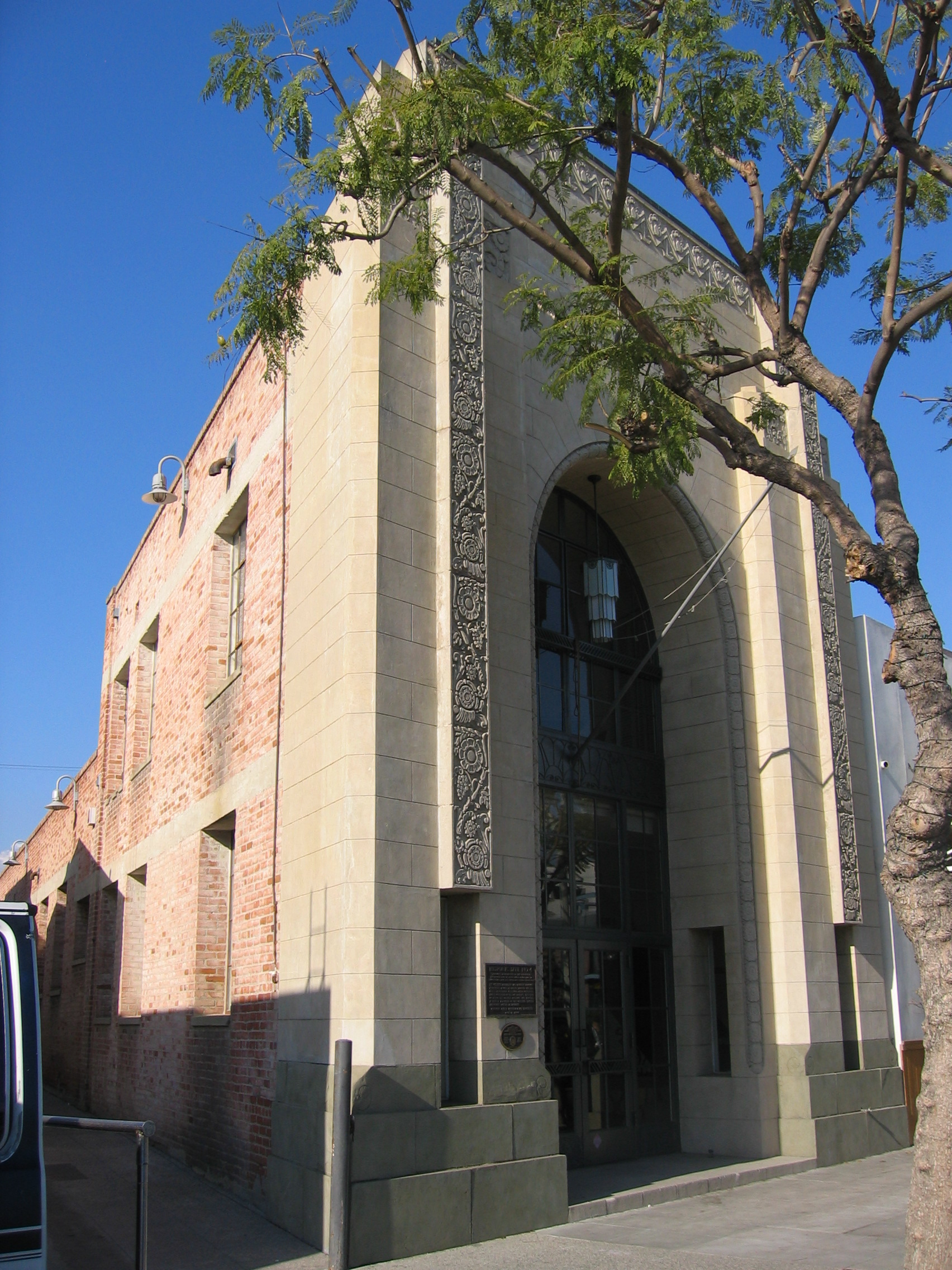
- The Citizen Publishing Company Building in 2009

- Location within California
- Location: 9355 Culver Boulevard; Culver City, California
- Coordinates: 34°1′31″N 118°23′35″W
- Area: less than one acre
- Built: 1929
- Architects: Orville Clark, Catherine Donovan
- Architectural style: Beaux Arts, Art Deco
- NRHP reference No.: 87000082
- Added to NRHP: February 12, 1987

The Citizen Publishing Company Building is a historic building in Culver City, California, US. It was built in 1929. It has been listed on the National Register of Historic Places since February 12, 1987. It was constructed by Eugene and Kitty Donovan as the headquarters for their publishing company and The Citizen, a local newspaper.

== Citizen Public Market ==
Citizen Public Market

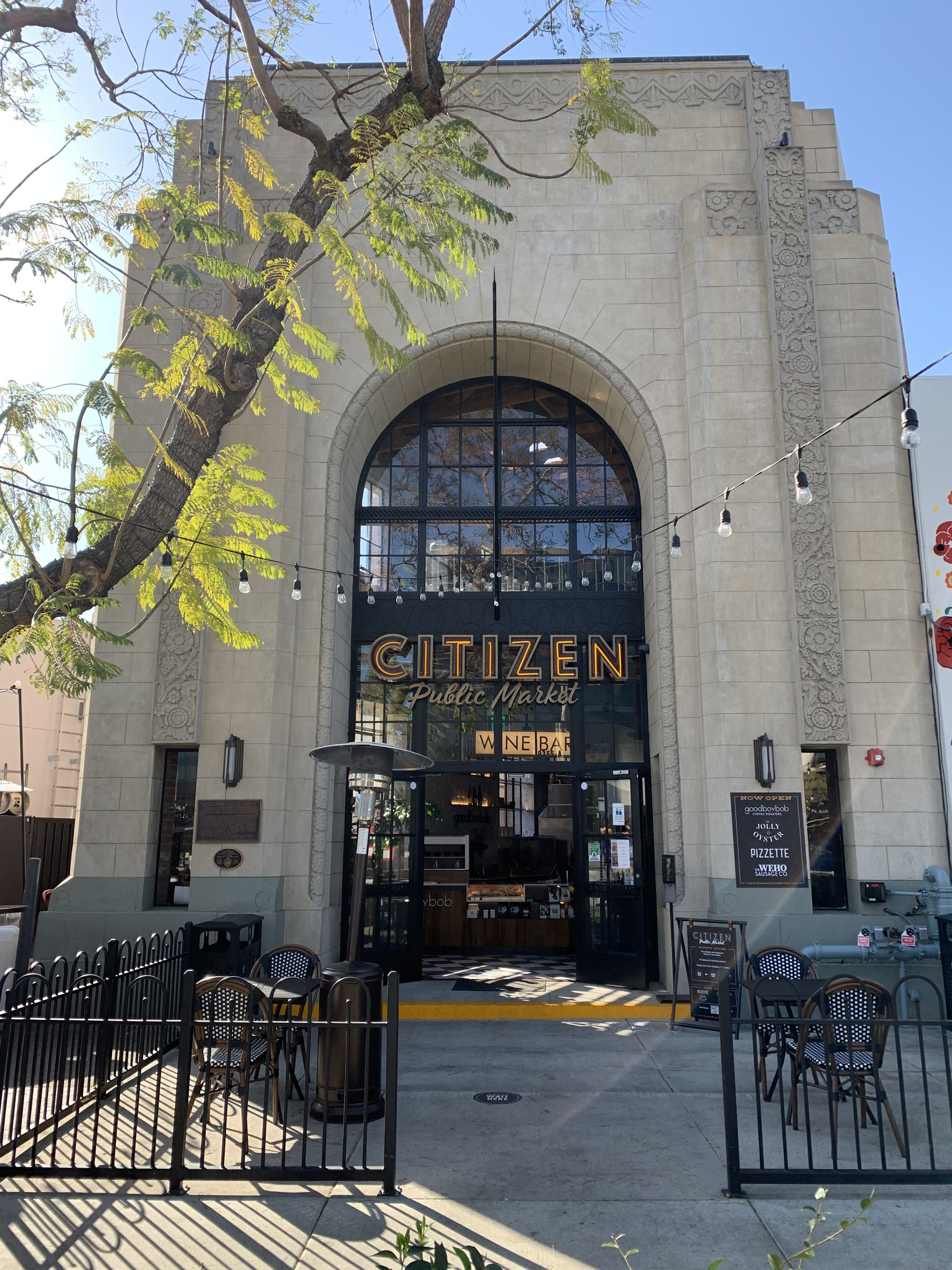
- Location: Culver City, California
- Address: 9355 Culver Boulevard
- Opened: November 18, 2020; 5 years ago
- Closed: November 2, 2025; 12 months ago
- Num. of stores: 9
- Floors: 2
- Website: Citizen Public Market at the Wayback Machine (archived 2025-02-21)

From 2020 to 2025, the building housed Citizen Public Market, Culver City's first food hall. It opened on November 18, 2020. The two-story 7,500 ft^{2} (700 square metres) space housed eight restaurants and a rooftop deck. It permanently closed on November 2, 2025.
