= Jangal Tir Ahmad =

Jangal Tir Ahmad جنگل تيراحمد
- Village
- Location within Iran
- Coordinates: 26°33′51″N 57°45′48″E
- Country: Iran
- Province: Hormozgan
- County: Bashagard
- Bakhsh: Gowharan
- Rural District: Gowharan

Population (2006)
  - Total: 120
- Time zone: UTC+3:30 (IRST)
  - Summer (DST): UTC+4:30 (IRDT)

Jangal Tir Ahmad (Persian: جنگل تيراحمد, also Romanized as Jangal Tīr Aḩmad; also known as Jangal) is a village in Gowharan Rural District, Gowharan District, Bashagard County, Hormozgan Province, Iran. At the 2006 census, its population was 120, in 29 families.
