= 2006 Chicago Big Box Ordinance =

On July 26, 2006, the Chicago City Council voted to approve an ordinance which for 7 weeks made Chicago the largest United States city that required big-box retailers to pay what the ordinance's sponsors characterized as a "living wage." Formally entitled "AMENDMENT OF TITLE 4 OF MUNICIPAL CODE OF CHICAGO BY CREATION OF NEW CHAPTER 404 ENTITLED "LARGE RETAILERS"", the ordinance was popularly known as the "Living Wage Ordinance" or "Big Box Ordinance." The ordinance defined "Large Retailers" as those with annual gross revenues of $1 billion or more or with stores of 90,000 square feet or more. "Large retailers" were required to pay $9.25 per hour in wages and $1.50 per hour in benefits, with a schedule of cost of living increases. (At the time, the minimum wage was $6.50 per hour state and $5.15 federal).

The ordinance was sponsored by Aldermen Moore, Flores, Tillman, Preckwinkle, Hairston, Lyle, Beavers, Stroger, Beale, Pope, Balcer, Cardenas, Olivo, Theodore Thomas, Coleman, Latasha Thomas, Murphy, Troutman, Munoz, Chandler, Ocasio, Ed Smith, Reboyras, Matlak, Austin, Colon, Allen, Laurino, Levar, Shiller, Schulter, Maryanne Smith and Stone.

This legislation was widely reported in the national press. More than two dozen publications, including the Fort Worth Star-Telegram, Houston Chronicle, The Kansas City Star, Rocky Mountain News, The Seattle Times, and Philadelphia Daily News, carried the story.

Mayor Richard M. Daley vetoed the ordinance on September 11, 2006, and two days later the City Council sustained the veto.

== See also ==
- Living wage
