= Jangal-e Mukan =

Jangal-e Mukan جنگل موكان
- Village
- Location within Iran
- Coordinates: 27°34′26″N 61°00′04″E
- Country: Iran
- Province: Sistan and Baluchestan
- County: Khash
- Bakhsh: Irandegan
- Rural District: Irandegan

Population (2006)
  - Total: 68
- Time zone: UTC+3:30 (IRST)
  - Summer (DST): UTC+4:30 (IRDT)

Jangal-e Mukan (Persian: جنگل موكان, also Romanized as Jangal-e Mūkān) is a village in Irandegan Rural District, Irandegan District, Khash County, Sistan and Baluchestan Province, Iran. At the 2006 census, its population was 68, in 17 families.
