= Jangaliya Pura =

- village
- Location within Madhya Pradesh Location within India
- Coordinates: 23.658646°N 77.303927°E
- Country: India
- State: Madhya Pradesh
- District: Bhopal
- Tehsil: Berasia

Population (2011)
  - Total: 276
- Time zone: UTC+5:30 (IST)
- ISO 3166 code: MP-IN
- Census code: 482109

Jangaliya Pura is a village in the Bhopal district of Madhya Pradesh, India. It is located in the Berasia tehsil.

== Demographics ==
According to the 2011 census of India, Jangaliya Pura has 52 households. The effective literacy rate (i.e. the literacy rate of population excluding children aged 6 and below) is 48.29%.

Demographics (2011 Census)
	Total	Male	Female
Population	276	158	118
Children aged below 6 years	42	27	15
Scheduled caste	0	0	0
Scheduled tribe	0	0	0
Literates	113	81	32
Workers (all)	151	89	62
Main workers (total)	104	85	19
Main workers: Cultivators	86	71	15
Main workers: Agricultural labourers	14	11	3
Main workers: Household industry workers	0	0	0
Main workers: Other	4	3	1
Marginal workers (total)	47	4	43
Marginal workers: Cultivators	34	2	32
Marginal workers: Agricultural labourers	13	2	11
Marginal workers: Household industry workers	0	0	0
Marginal workers: Others	0	0	0
Non-workers	125	69	56
