= Jangal Rural District =

Jangal Rural District (Persian: دهستان جنگل) may refer to:

- Jangal Rural District (Fars Province)
- Jangal Rural District (Razavi Khorasan Province)
