= Jangli, Fars =

Janali جنگلي
- Village
- Location within Iran
- Coordinates: 28°56′01″N 54°56′43″E
- Country: Iran
- Province: Fars
- County: Neyriz
- Bakhsh: Qatruyeh
- Rural District: Rizab

Population (2006)
  - Total: 34
- Time zone: UTC+3:30 (IRST)
  - Summer (DST): UTC+4:30 (IRDT)

Jangli (Persian: جنگلي, also Romanized as Janglī; also known as Janalī) is a village in Rizab Rural District, Qatruyeh District, Neyriz County, Fars province, Iran. At the 2006 census, its population was 34, in 6 families.
