= Jangal, Khash =

Jangal جنگل
- Village
- Location within Iran
- Coordinates: 27°33′59″N 61°00′09″E
- Country: Iran
- Province: Sistan and Baluchestan
- County: Khash
- Bakhsh: Irandegan
- Rural District: Irandegan

Population (2006)
  - Total: 25
- Time zone: UTC+3:30 (IRST)
  - Summer (DST): UTC+4:30 (IRDT)

Jangal (Persian: جنگل; also known as Jangalak) is a village in Irandegan Rural District, Irandegan District, Khash County, Sistan and Baluchestan Province, Iran. At the 2006 census, its population was 25, in 6 families.
