= Jangla =

- Village
- Country: India
- State: Punjab
- District: Gurdaspur
- Tehsil: Batala
- Region: Majha

Government
  - Type: Panchayat raj
  - Body: Gram panchayat

Area
  - Total: 310 ha (770 acres)

Population (2011)
  - Total: 2,055; 1,082/973 ♂/♀
  - Scheduled Castes: 882; 484/398 ♂/♀
  - Total Households: 395

Languages
  - Official: Punjabi
- Time zone: UTC+5:30 (IST)
- Telephone: 01871
- ISO 3166 code: IN-PB
- Vehicle registration: PB-18
- Website: gurdaspur.nic.in

Jangla is a village in Batala in Gurdaspur district of Punjab State, India. It is located 14 kilometres (8.7 mi) from sub district headquarter, 45 kilometres (28 mi) from district headquarter and 50 kilometres (31 mi) from Sri Hargobindpur. The village is administrated by Sarpanch an elected representative of the village.

== Demography ==
As of 2011, the village has a total number of 395 houses and a population of 2055 of which 1082 are males while 973 are females. According to the report published by Census India in 2011, out of the total population of the village 882 people are from Schedule Caste and the village does not have any Schedule Tribe population so far.

== Notable people ==
- Sardar Kewal Singh Sarpanch

== See also ==
- List of villages in India
