= Palisades del Rey, California =

Palisades del Rey Surfridge
- Former settlement
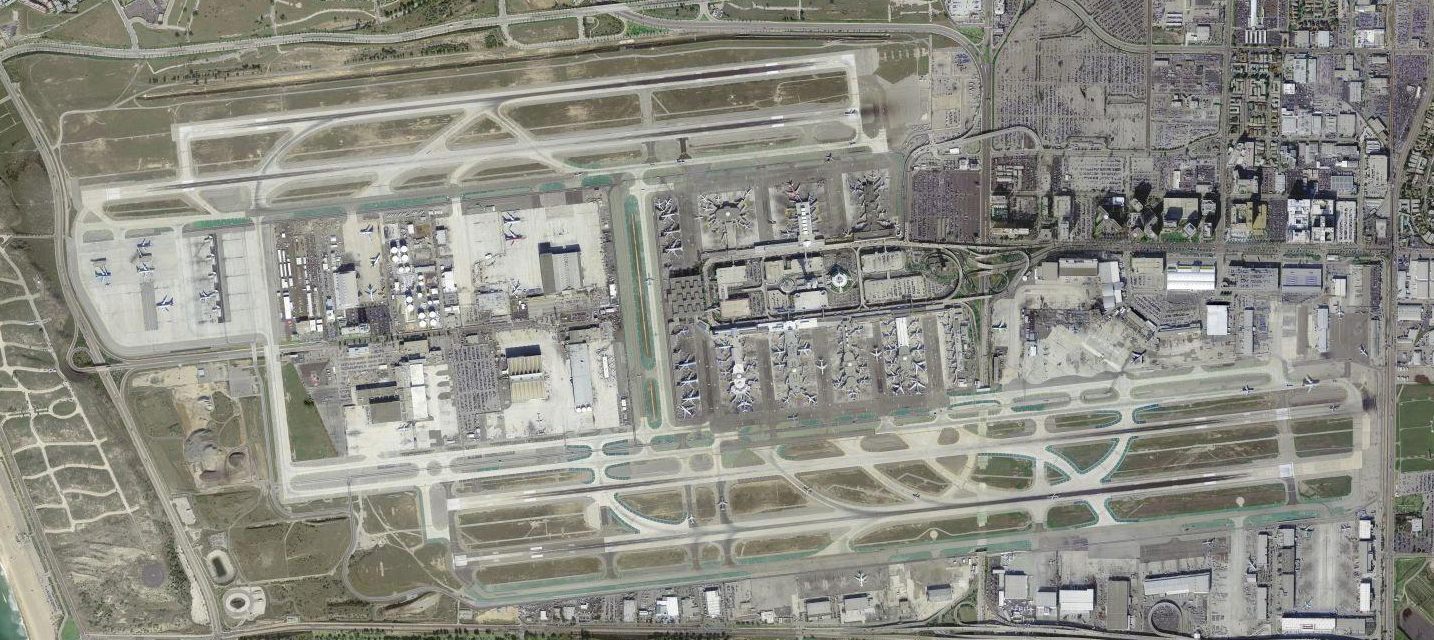
- Abandoned streets of Palisades del Rey, visible to the left of Los Angeles International Airport

- Location in California
- Coordinates: 33°56′25″N 118°26′16″W
- Country: United States
- State: California
- County: Los Angeles County
- City: Los Angeles
- Elevation: 135 ft (41 m)

Palisades del Rey (Spanish for "Palisades of the King") was a 1921 neighborhood land development by Dickinson & Gillespie Co. that later came to be called the Playa del Rey district of Los Angeles County, California. It sits at an elevation of 135 feet (41 m). All of the houses in this area were custom built, many as beach homes owned by Hollywood actors and producers, including Cecil B. DeMille, Charles Bickford, and others.

A southern portion of Playa del Rey became known as Surfridge. It was south of the current remaining area of Playa del Rey and north of El Segundo and immediately west of the perimeter of Los Angeles International Airport (LAX). The area is bounded on the east by LAX, on the north by Waterview and Napoleon streets, on the south by Imperial Highway, and on the west by Vista del Mar. The beach to the west of the area is Dockweiler State Beach.

== Development ==
Surfridge was developed in the 1920s and 1930s as "an isolated playground for the wealthy." In 1925 the developer held a contest to name the neighborhood and awarded the $1,000 prize to an Angeleno who submitted "Surfridge." The Los Angeles Times wrote that Surfridge was chosen "due to its brevity, euphony, ease of pronunciation ... but above all because it tells the story of this new wonder city."

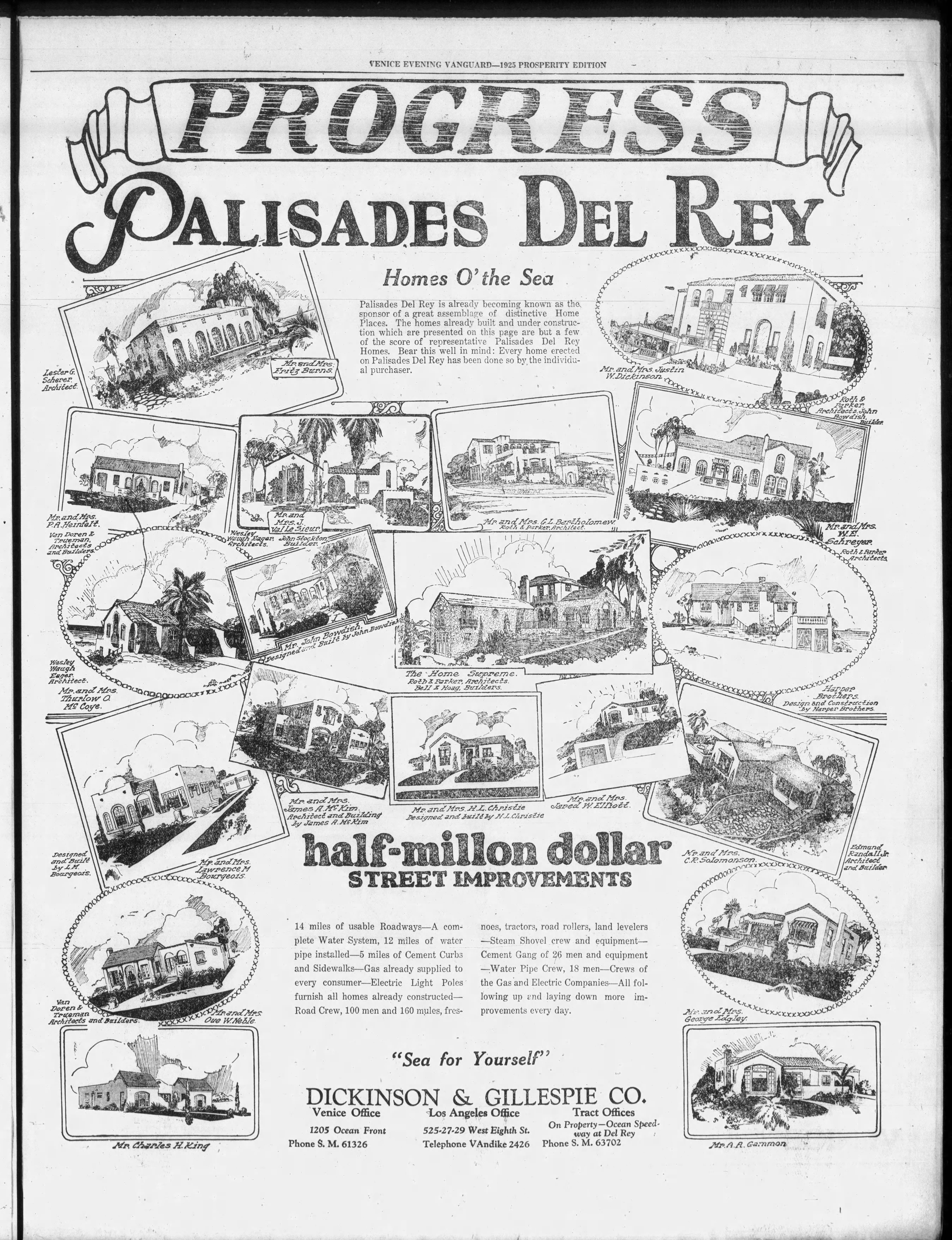
1926 ad

Salesmen pitched tents on the sand dunes and sold lots for $50 down and 36 monthly payments of $20. House exteriors could only be made of stucco, brick or stone; frame structures were prohibited. Development was slowed by the onset of the Great Depression, but in the early 1930s the wealthy began to buy lots to build large homes. By the 1950s, the area was completely filled in with houses and apartment complexes.

== Airport ==
Mines Field, a small airport at that time, opened to the east of Surfridge in 1928. It became a popular location for residents to see air shows.

The growing number of commercial flights into Los Angeles following World War II meant a higher number of planes flying low over Surfridge. Many residents learned to coexist with the noise from propeller planes, but jet engines were difficult to ignore.

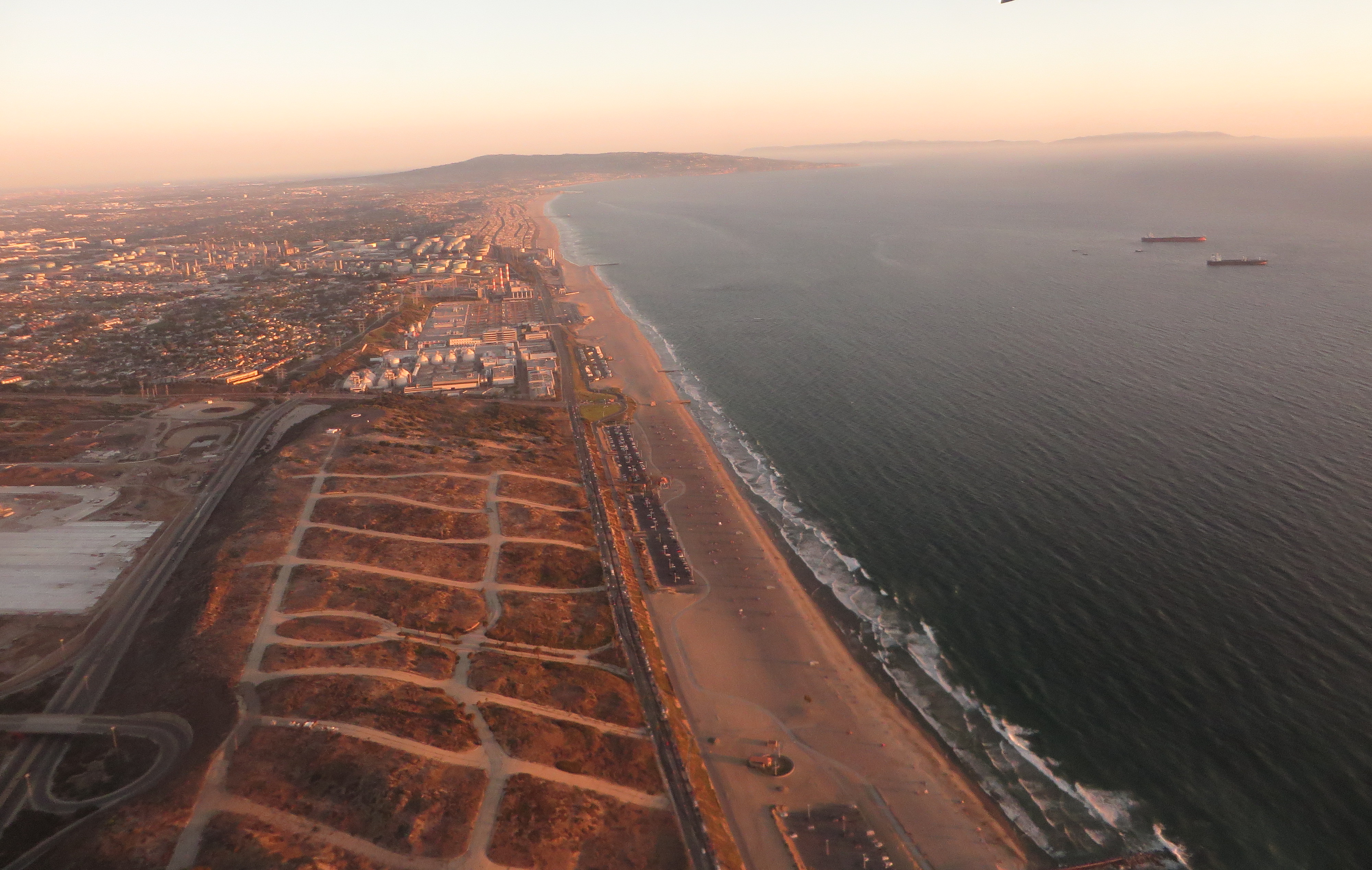
Aerial view of El Segundo and the area formerly known as Surfridge.

"If you lived in Surfridge prior to the late 1950s, you had to raise your voice a bit when having a conversation. After the jets came, you had to literally stop talking when they took off," said Duke Dukesherer, a business executive who has written about Surfridge's history.

In the 1960s and 1970s, the area was condemned and acquired by the City of Los Angeles in a series of eminent domain purchases to facilitate airport expansion and to address concerns about noise from jet airplanes. Along with neighboring areas of Westchester to the north of the airport, homeowners were forced to sell their property to the city. Several homeowners sued the city and remained in their houses for several years after the majority of houses were vacated. Eventually all the houses were either moved or demolished. Until 2001, a single east-west street, Sandpiper Street, remained open to through traffic.

== Nature preserve ==
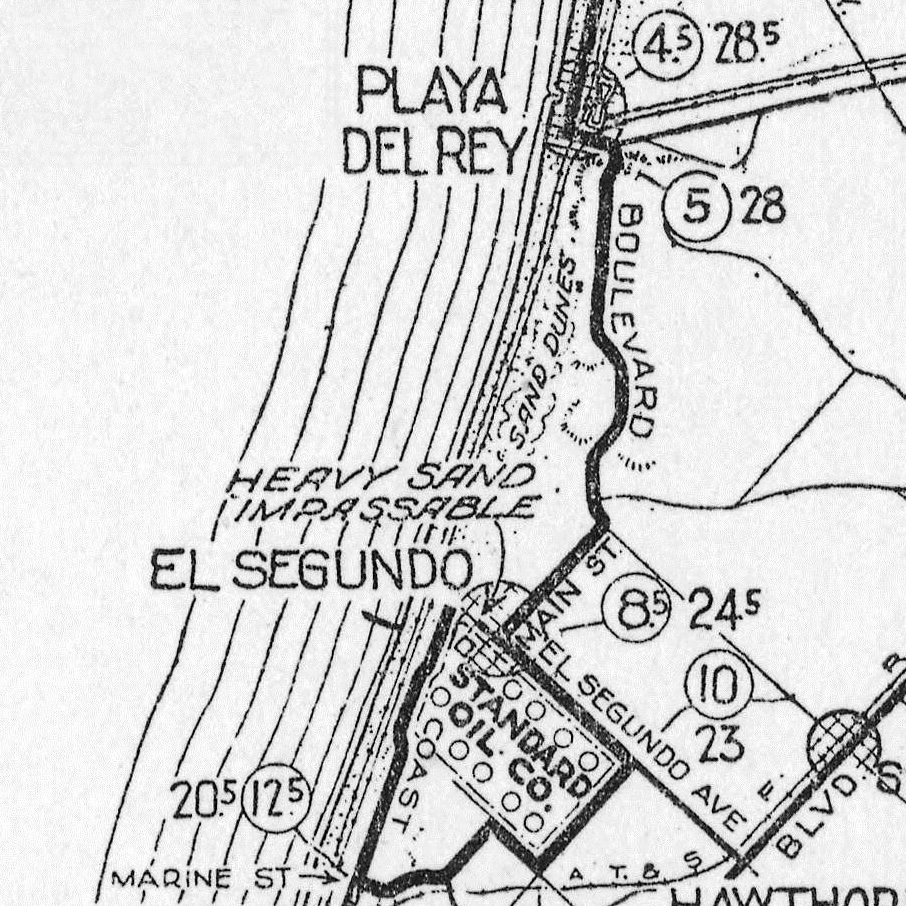
The original El Segundo dunes habitat is depicted in this 1918 road map; the area that became Palisades Del Rey was deemed "heavy sand impassable".

The neighborhood is now enclosed by chain-link fences. Old residential streets are still visible through the fencing and from the air. In the 1980s Los Angeles International Airport proposed the construction of a golf course in the area. The California Coastal Commission rejected the plans in order to protect the El Segundo blue butterfly.

The area is now a protected habitat for the endangered butterflies. In 2019, a number of rare burrowing owls were sighted nesting in the preserve. California gnatcatchers are also found amidst the restored sand dunes and coastal sage scrub despite the noise.

The only part of the neighborhood still accessible to the public is Vista Del Mar Park, a small park with a playground and picnic area on Vista Del Mar Boulevard. This park was part of the old neighborhood, and wasn't closed because as dedicated property the city of Los Angeles "doesn't destroy parks". As of 1986 the park turned 35 years old. Vista Del Mar Park is maintained by the City of Los Angeles.
