= Jangala (charity) =

British charity providing internet access

Jangala is a British charity "dedicated to enabling internet access for people in need of urgent humanitarian aid or longer-term development assistance". It has developed the Big Box, a kit which can provide internet access in a refugee camp or similar environment, and Get Box, which enables a household to have internet access.
