= Jangali Maharaj =

Hindu saint (1806–1890)

Jangali Maharaj (1818–1890), also known as Sadguru Jangali Maharaj or Guru Maharaj "Jungle" (Jangali) "Resident of forest" (Maharaj) Emperor. A major commercial road in Pune (Jangali Maharaj Road) is named after him.

It is believed that he was born in Honmurgi village near Solapur Maharashtra in the early 18th century. Very little is known about his early life, other than that he was Guru of Patthe Bapurao Kulkarni, a Maharashtrian.

He worked as a spiritual teacher. Certain traditions associate him with teachings on the chakras.
