= Michele Lean =

Malaysian public figure and writer

- Born: 1 September 1982 (age 43); Kuala Lumpur, Malaysia
- Education: Island School; Garden International School; University of Melbourne; New York Film Academy
- Occupation: Television presenter

Michele Samantha Yi Wen Lean (Note: simplified Chinese: 连仪温; traditional Chinese: 連儀溫; pinyin: Lián Yí Wēn; Jyutping: Lin4 Ji4 Wan1; Pe̍h-ōe-jī: Liân Gî-un) (born 1 September 1982), known professionally as Michele Lean, is a Malaysian television presenter, writer, actress, and commercial talent. From 2007–2010, she was a television presenter on China Central Television (abbreviated as CCTV), hosting CCTV-9's "Travelogue" and Center Stage. She is a Malaysian citizen and Australian permanent resident who currently resides in Beijing, China.

== Early life ==
Lean is of Malaysian Chinese descent with Tahitiian lineage from the maternal side of her family. She is also of Iban heritage and grew up in Kuala Lumpur, Borneo, Hong Kong and Melbourne, Australia. She is the eldest of three children.

== Education ==
She graduated with a Bachelor of Arts in Media and Communications from the University of Melbourne in Australia, before moving to China in 2007. While in university, she was the editor-in-chief of the (now defunct) Melbourne-based lifestyle publication Veeza magazine, a subsidiary of Out4Fame Publications. In Australia, she is represented by China Arts Management in Melbourne.

She trained in acting at the New York Film Academy in New York.

== Media career ==
She has previously interned at the CNN International Asia Pacific office, the Herald Sun online department and The Sun newspaper in Malaysia.

In July 2007, Lean was recruited by CCTV's international-language channel CCTV-9, to host their flagship travel program and later hosted CCTV-9's music variety show Center Stage. She also briefly hosted CCTV-9's daily current affairs program Culture Express.

Her debut broadcast for CCTV's Travelogue was filmed in Xinjiang, China. She appeared on 3-episodes of the award-winning ethnic minority series, "Ethnic Odyssey", the first of the Travelogue programs to be released on DVD in China.

During the 2008 Summer Olympics, she hosted Episode 1 (Central Beijing) and Episode 4 (East Beijing) on Travelogue, the "Being Beijing" series and mini-series, two special programs highlighting the sights, nightlife and culinary delights of Beijing city for Olympic visitors. The series aired throughout the duration of the Beijing Olympics and is also available on DVD throughout China.

In 2011, Lean hosted a special two-episode series in Beijing for CCTV-10's the "Outlook English" program, in Mandarin and English. She was later invited by Outlook English to sit on the guest judging panel of CCTV-10's "Star of Outlook 2011" competition, an annual nationwide English-speaking contest.

She was selected to host 'Carnival China Style 2011', a major annual Chinese New Year gala, in a month-long tour of the United States with the All-China Federation of Returned Overseas Association. The tour was received in 8 different cities including, Las Vegas, Reno, Modesto, San Francisco and Los Angeles. She continues to co-operate with the All-China Federation of Returned Overseas Association in hopes of linking the cultures of her home countries (Malaysia and Australia) and China's.

=== Acting ===
Lean appears in the director's cut of the 2011 Chinese remake of What Women Want '我知女人心', alongside Andy Lau. The film was directed by Chen Da Ming

She is the lead actress in 'Red Room', winner of the 2011 48 Hour Film Contest's Beijing Audience Award, written and directed by Nelson Quan.

=== Press ===
She has appeared in numerous media publications in Australia, Malaysia and China. Notably, in January 2008, where she was interviewed for her style in Vogue China. In 2009 & 2010, she appeared in the luxury and society publication Icon Magazine in Malaysia

=== Others ===
She is an avid scuba diver and is a certified PADI Advanced Open Water diver.

Lean is the recipient of The Culinary Trust 2012 -2013 scholarship to Le Cordon Bleu Ottawa.
