= Hughes H-4 Hercules =

American World War II heavy flying boat

Coordinates: 45.204°N 123.145°W

Hughes H-4 Hercules Spruce Goose
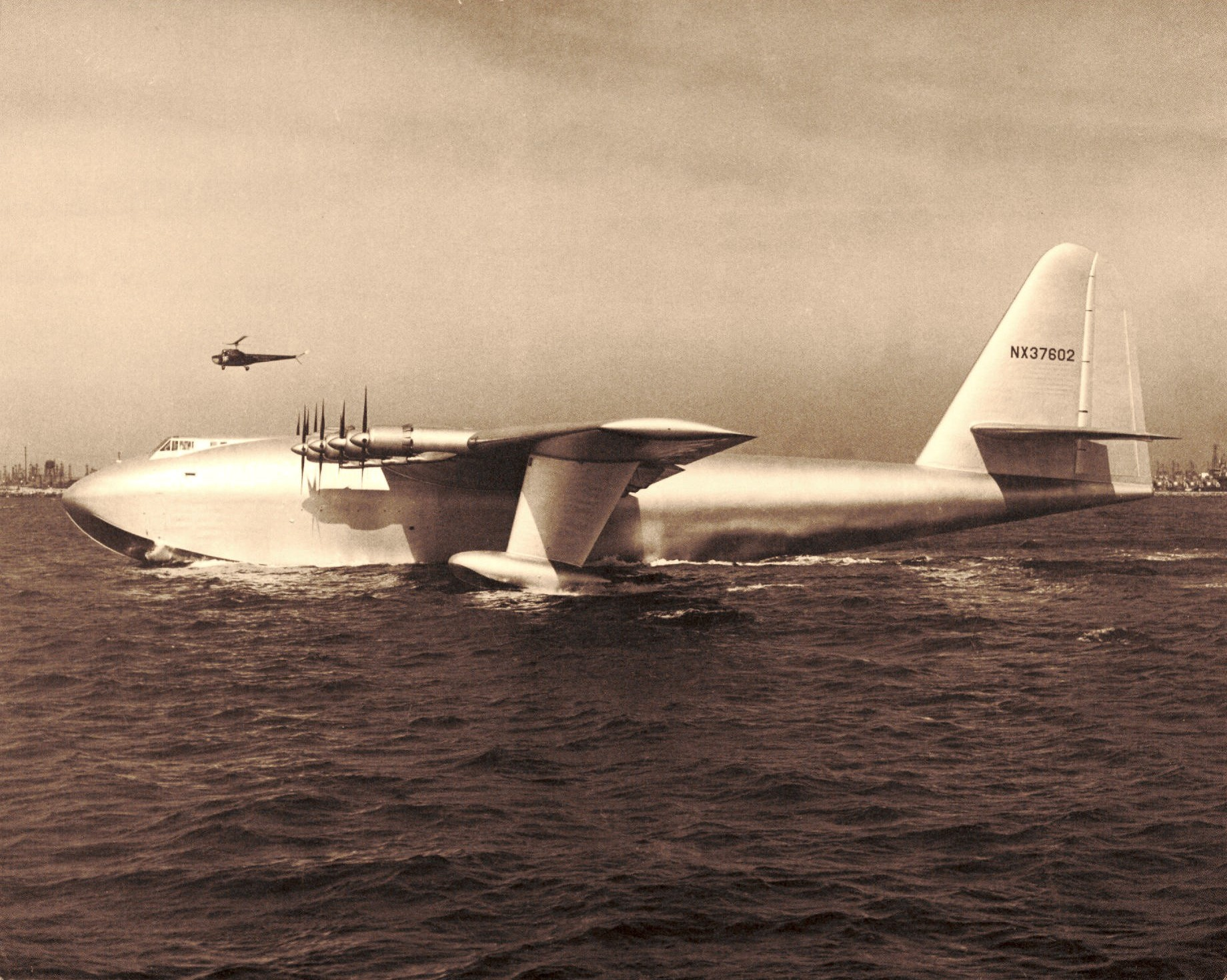

General information
- Type: Heavy transport flying boat
- National origin: United States
- Manufacturer: Hughes Aircraft
- Designer: Howard Hughes
- Status: Preserved
- Number built: 1
- Flights: 1

History
- Manufactured: 1947
- Introduction date: 1947
- First flight: November 2, 1947 (79 years ago)
- Preserved at: North American Aerospace Museum
- Fate: Preserved

The Hughes H-4 Hercules (commonly known as the Spruce Goose; registration NX37602) is a prototype strategic airlift flying boat designed and built by the Hughes Aircraft Company. Intended as a transatlantic flight transport for use during World War II, it was not completed in time to be used in the war. The aircraft made only one brief flight, on November 2, 1947, and the project never advanced beyond the prototype.

Built from wood (Duramold process) because of wartime restrictions on the use of aluminum and concerns about weight, the aircraft was nicknamed the Spruce Goose by critics, although it was made almost entirely of birch. The Birch Bitch was a more accurate but less socially acceptable moniker that was allegedly used by the mechanics who worked on the plane. The Hercules is the largest seaplane ever built, and it had the largest wingspan of any aircraft ever flown until the twin-fuselaged Scaled Composites Stratolaunch first flew on April 13, 2019. The aircraft remains in good condition. After being displayed to the public in Long Beach, California, from 1980 to 1992, it was moved to display at the North American Aerospace Museum in McMinnville, Oregon, United States. It was relisted on the National Register of Historic Places in 2024.

== Design and development ==
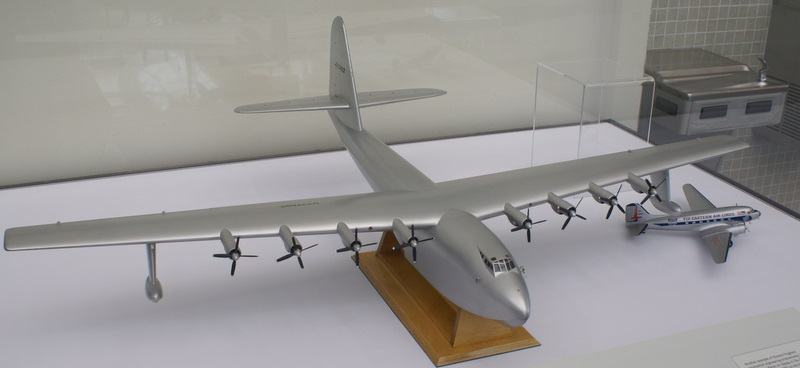
Size comparison between the H-4 and a Douglas DC-3

In 1942, the U.S. War Department needed to transport war materiel and personnel to Britain. Allied shipping in the Atlantic Ocean was suffering heavy losses to German U-boats, so a requirement was issued for an aircraft that could cross the Atlantic with a large payload. Wartime priorities meant the aircraft could not be made of strategic materials (e.g., aluminum).

The aircraft was the brainchild of Henry J. Kaiser, a leading Liberty ship builder and manufacturer. Kaiser teamed with aircraft designer Howard Hughes to create what would become the largest aircraft yet built. It was designed to carry 150,000 pounds (68,000 kg), 750 fully equipped troops or two 30-ton M4 Sherman tanks. The original designation "HK-1" reflected the Hughes and Kaiser collaboration.

The HK-1 aircraft contract was issued in 1942 as a development contract and called for three aircraft to be constructed in two years for the war effort. Seven configurations were considered, including twin-hull and single-hull designs with combinations of four, six, and eight wing-mounted engines. The final design chosen was a behemoth, eclipsing any large transport then built. (Note: Quote: "Kaiser announces the most monumental program in the history of aviation.") It would be built mostly of wood to conserve metal (its elevators and rudder were fabric-covered), and was nicknamed the Spruce Goose (a name Hughes disliked) or the Flying Lumberyard.

While Kaiser had originated the "flying cargo ship" concept, he did not have an aeronautical background and deferred to Hughes and his designer, Glenn Odekirk. Development dragged on, which frustrated Kaiser, who blamed delays partly on restrictions placed for the acquisition of strategic materials such as aluminum, and partly on Hughes' insistence on "perfection." Construction of the first HK-1 took place 16 months after the receipt of the development contract. Kaiser then withdrew from the project.

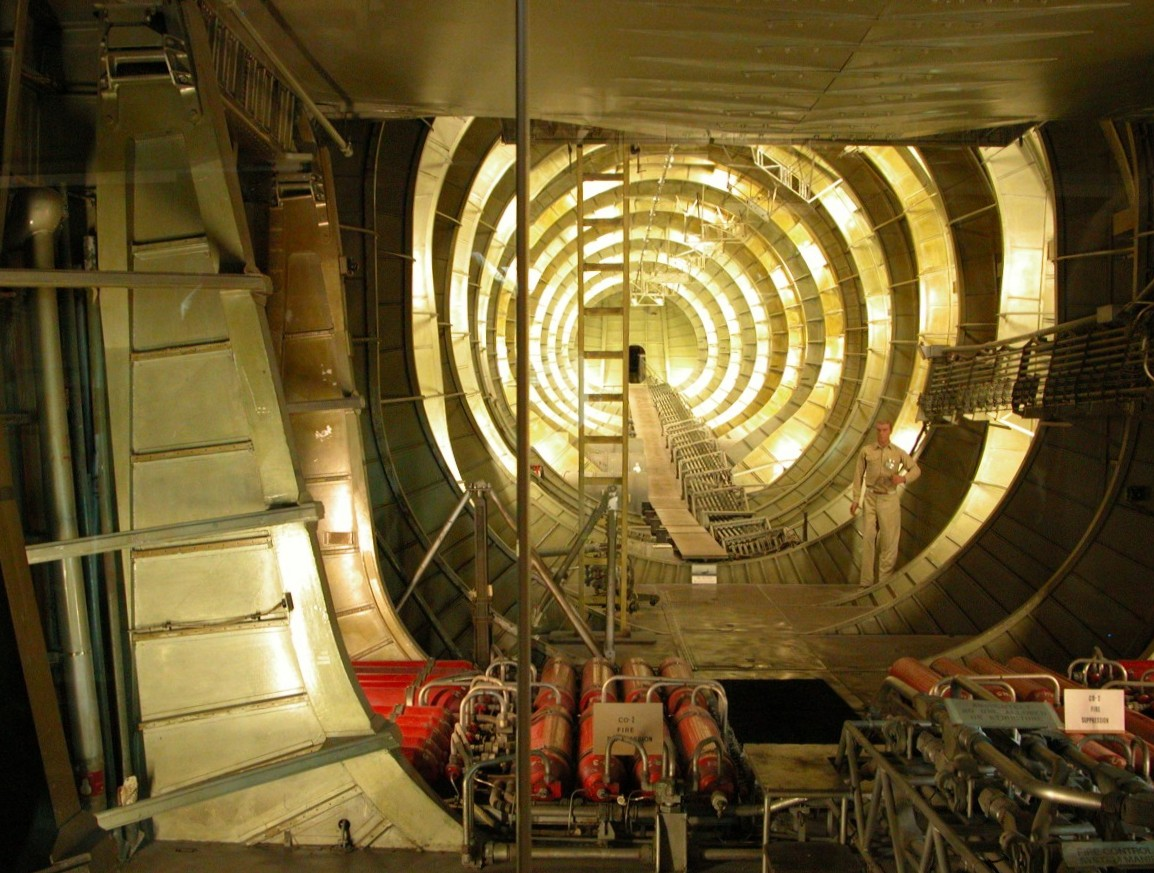
Rearward view of the Hercules H-4's fuselage

Hughes continued the program on his own under the designation H-4 Hercules, (Note: The Hughes design was initially identified as the HFB-1 to signify "Hughes Flying Boat, First Design".) signing a new government contract that now limited production to one example. Work proceeded slowly, and the H-4 was not completed until well after the war was over. The plane was built by the Hughes Aircraft Company at Hughes Airport, location of present-day Playa Vista, Los Angeles, California, employing the plywood-and-resin "Duramold" process (Note: The Hughes Corporation had used the duramold process, which laminated plywood and resin into a lightweight but strong building material that could be shaped.) – a form of composite technology – for the laminated wood construction, which was considered a technological tour de force. The specialized wood veneer was made by Roddis Manufacturing in Marshfield, Wisconsin. Hamilton Roddis had teams of young women ironing the (unusually thin) strong birch wood veneer before shipping to California.

A house moving company transported the airplane on streets to Pier E (now Pier T) in Long Beach, California. They moved it in three large sections: the fuselage, each wing—and a fourth, smaller shipment with tail assembly parts and other smaller assemblies. After Hughes Aircraft completed final assembly, they erected a hangar around the flying boat, with a ramp to launch the H-4 into the harbor.

Howard Hughes was called to testify before the Senate War Investigating Committee in 1947 over the use of government funds for the aircraft. During a Senate hearing on August 6, 1947 (the first of a series of appearances), Hughes said:

The Hercules was a monumental undertaking. It is the largest aircraft ever built. It is over five stories tall with a wingspan longer than a football field. That's more than a city block. Now, I put the sweat of my life into this thing. I have my reputation all rolled up in it and I have stated several times that if it's a failure, I'll probably leave this country and never come back. And I mean it. (Note: Hughes' Senate Hearings testimony is now in the public domain.)

In all, development cost for the plane reached $23 million (equivalent to $260 million in 2025 dollars).

== Operational history ==
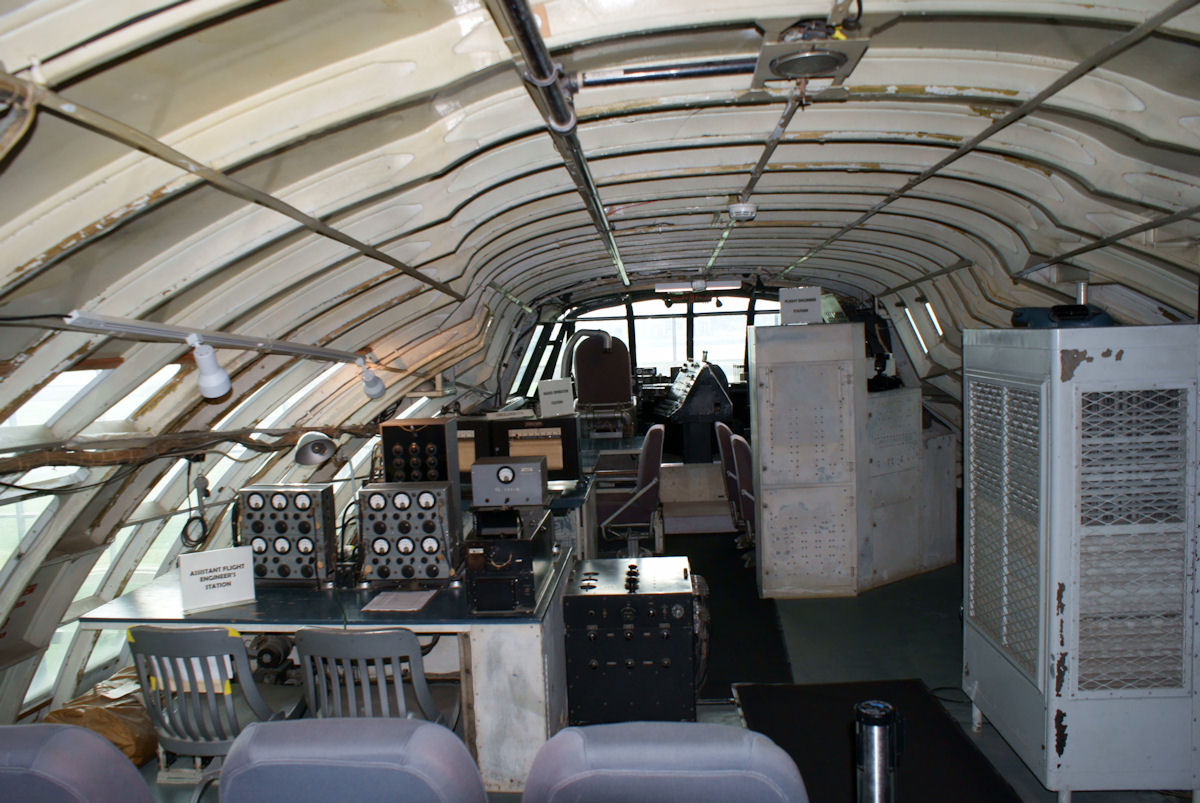
The flight deck of the H-4, 2010

Hughes returned to California during a break in the Senate hearings to run taxi tests on the H-4. On November 2, 1947, the taxi tests began with Hughes at the controls. His crew included Dave Grant as copilot, two flight engineers, Don Smith and Joe Petrali, 16 mechanics, and two other flight crew. The H-4 also carried seven invited guests from the press corps and an additional seven industry representatives. In total, thirty-six people were on board.

Four reporters left to file stories after the first two taxi runs while the remaining press stayed for the final test run of the day. After picking up speed on the channel facing Cabrillo Beach, the Hercules lifted off, remaining airborne for 26 seconds at 70 ft (21 m) off the water at a speed of 135 miles per hour (217 km/h) for about one mile (1.6 km). At this altitude, the aircraft still experienced ground effect. To Hughes, these tests demonstrated that the now-unneeded plane was flight-worthy, and thus worth the use of government funds.

The H-4 never flew again after its first test flight. Because World War II had ended, the military no longer needed it to carry troops or equipment across the ocean. Its lifting capacity and ceiling were never tested. Afterwards a full-time crew of 300 workers, all sworn to secrecy, maintained the aircraft in flying condition in a climate-controlled hangar. The company reduced the crew to 50 workers in 1962 and then disbanded it after Hughes' death in 1976.

== Display ==
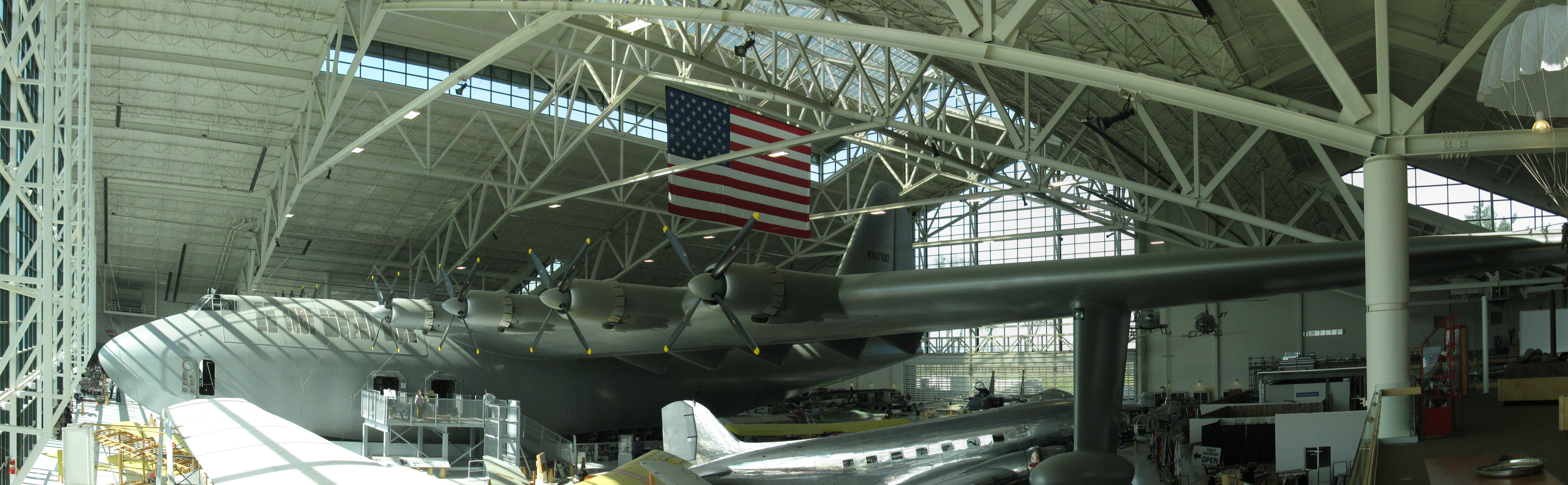
H-4 Hercules at North American Aerospace Museum. A Douglas DC-3 parked beneath its wing shows the scale of the H-4.

Ownership of the H-4 was disputed by the U.S. government, which had contracted for its construction. In the mid-1970s, an agreement was reached whereby the Smithsonian Institution's National Air and Space Museum would receive the Hughes H-1 Racer and section of the H-4's wing, the Summa Corporation would pay $700,000 and receive ownership of the H-4, the U.S. government would cede any rights, and the aircraft would be protected "from commercial exploitation."

A plan to dismantle the aircraft and offer portions of it to various museums was put forward in May 1980. A group called the Committee to Save the Hughes Flying Boat was formed to prevent this and the following week Los Angeles County announced that it wanted it to be displayed intact.

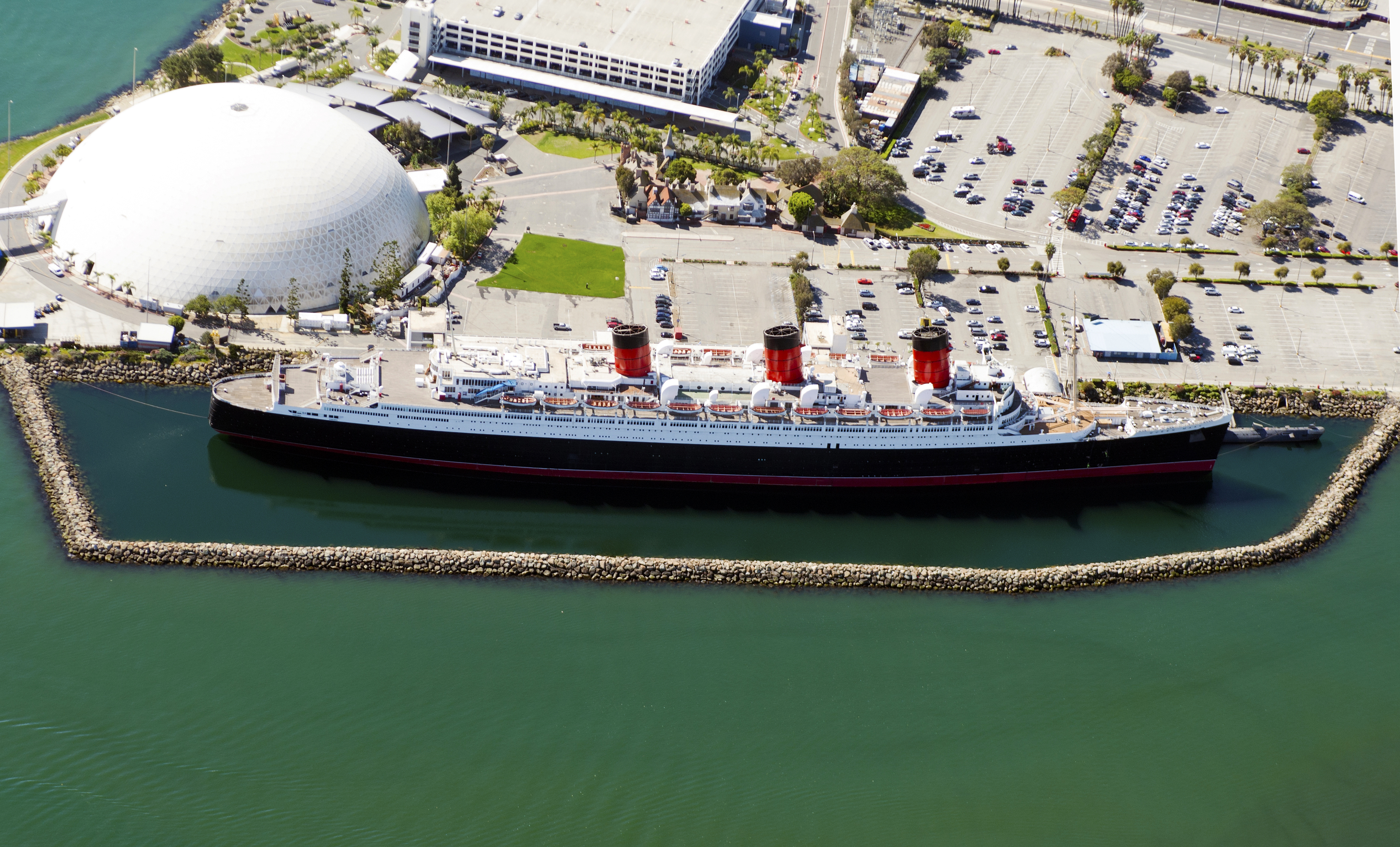
The "Spruce Goose Dome" next to the RMS Queen Mary in Long Beach

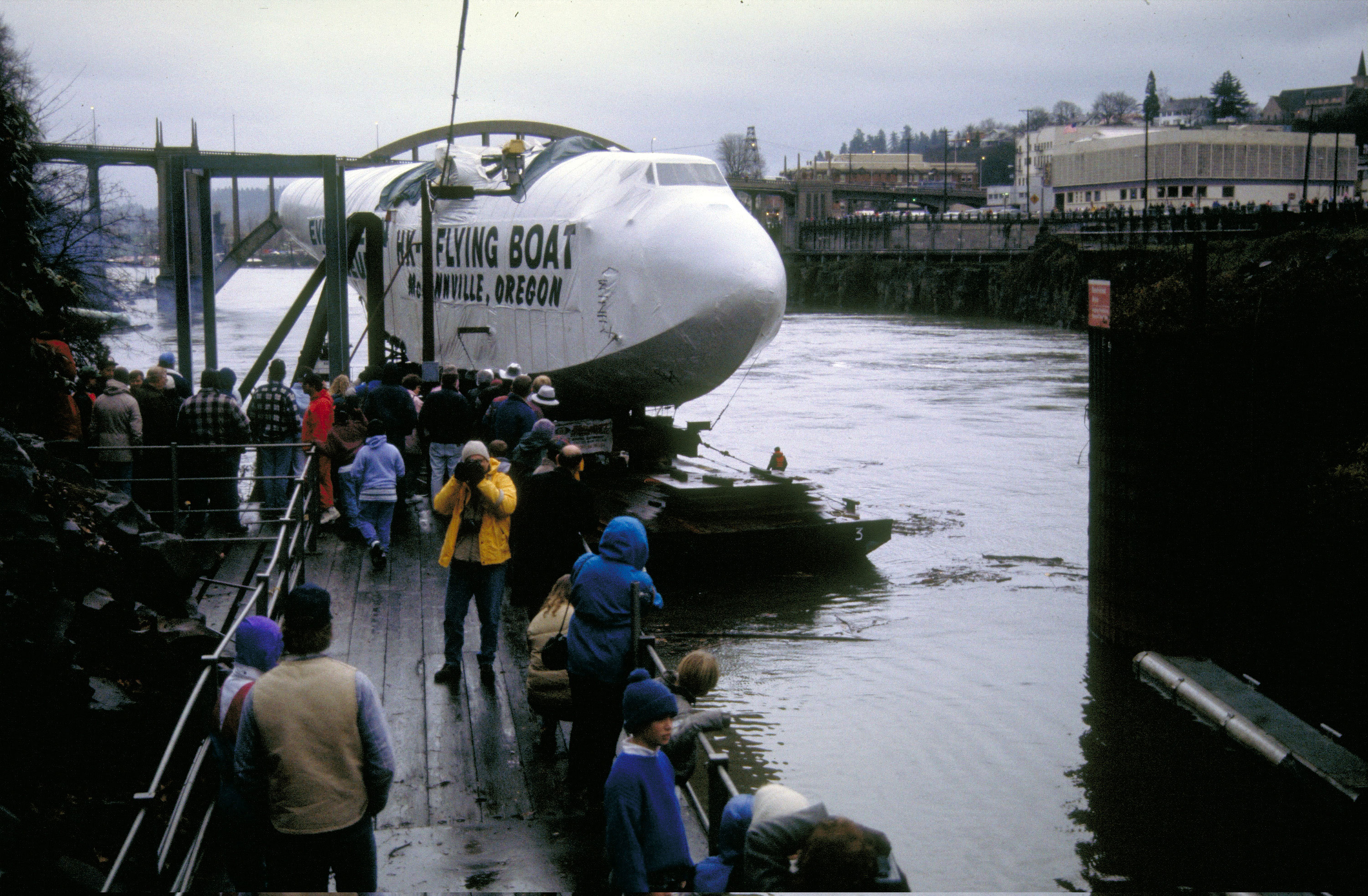
The H-4 Hercules fuselage in transport near the Willamette Falls Locks on its way to McMinnville, Oregon in 1992.

In 1980, the H-4 was acquired by the Aero Club of Southern California, which later put the aircraft on display in a very large geodesic dome next to the Queen Mary ship exhibit in Long Beach, California. The large dome facility became known as the Spruce Goose Dome. The very large enclosed indoor dome area around the H-4 consisted of meeting and special event space, elaborate audio-visual displays about Howard Hughes and the aircraft itself, and dining areas for tourists. Many convention groups held large dinners, sales meetings, and even concerts under the wings of the aircraft at night when the Spruce Goose Dome was closed to tourists. In 1986, a secondary simulator-style attraction named Time Voyager was constructed next to the H-4, at a cost of $2.5 million (~$6.22 million in 2025). In 1988, The Walt Disney Company acquired both Long Beach attractions and the associated Long Beach real estate by Pier J. In 1991, Disney informed the Aero Club of Southern California that it no longer wished to display the Hercules aircraft after its highly ambitious Port Disney plan was scrapped.

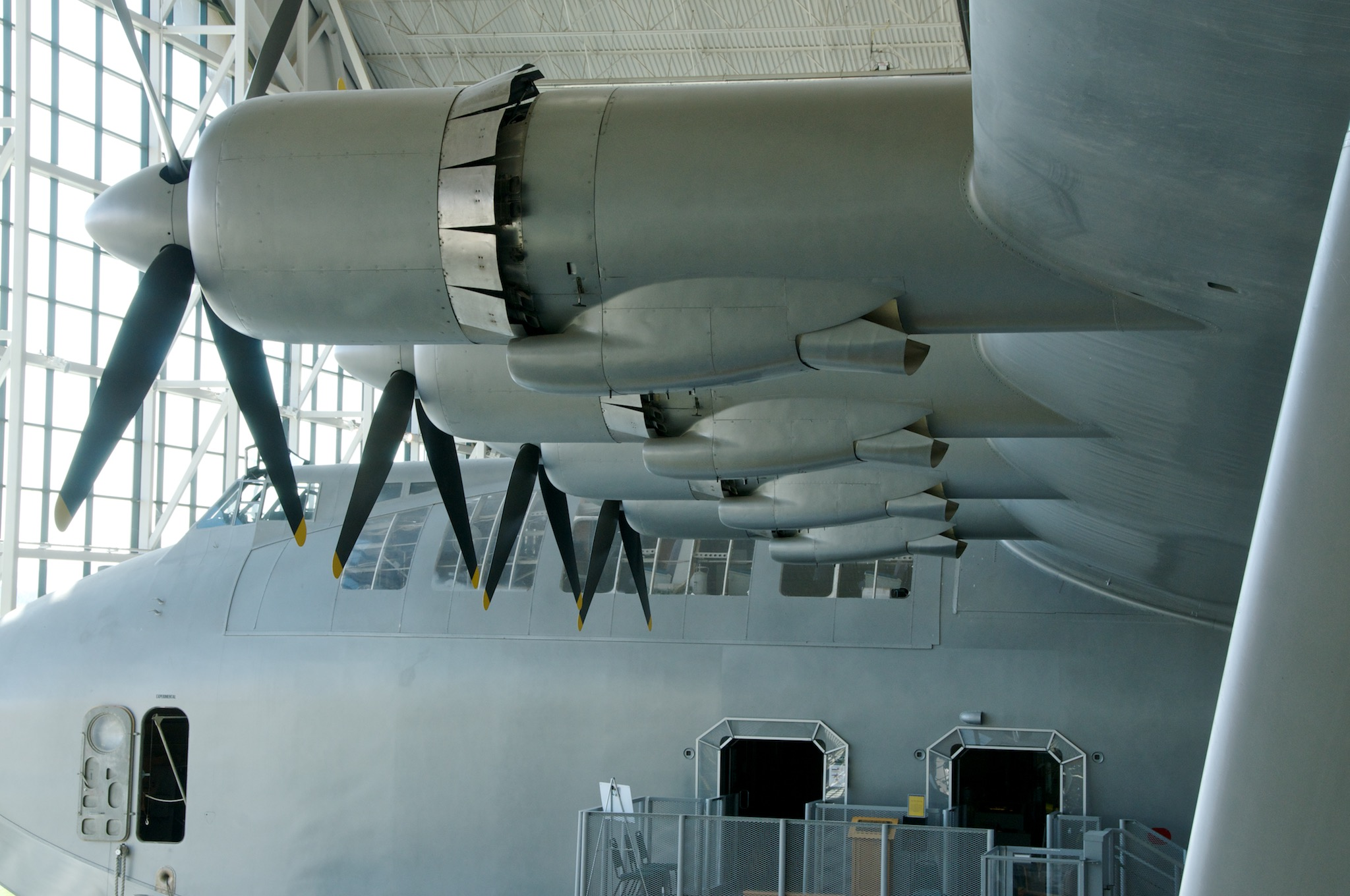
Hughes H-4 Hercules at North American Aerospace Museum

After a long search for a suitable host, the Aero Club of Southern California arranged for the Hughes Hercules flying boat to be given to North American Aerospace Museum in exchange for payments and a percentage of the museum's profits. The aircraft was transported by barge, train, and truck to its current home in McMinnville, Oregon (about 40 miles (64 km) southwest of Portland), where it was reassembled by Contractors Cargo Company and is currently on display. The aircraft arrived in McMinnville on February 27, 1993, after a 138-day, 1,055-mile (1,698 km) trip from Long Beach. The Spruce Goose geodesic dome is now used by Carnival Cruise Lines as its Long Beach terminal.

By the mid-1990s, the former Hughes Aircraft hangars at Hughes Airport, including the one that held the Hercules, were converted into sound stages. Scenes from movies such as Titanic, What Women Want and End of Days have been filmed in the 315,000-square-foot (29,300 m^{2}) aircraft hangar where Howard Hughes created the flying boat. The hangar will be preserved as a structure eligible for listing in the National Register of Historic Places in what is today the large light industry and housing development in the Playa Vista neighborhood of Los Angeles. It has since been converted to office and event space by Google.

== Specifications (H-4) ==
Performance specifications are projected.

Size comparison of the Hughes H-4 against other large aircraft

General characteristics

- Crew: 3
- Length: 218 ft 8 in (66.65 m)
- Wingspan: 319 ft 11 in (97.51 m)
- Height: 79 ft 4 in (24.18 m)
- Fuselage height: 30 ft (9.1 m)
- Empty weight: 250,000 lb (113,398 kg)
- Powerplant: 8 × Pratt & Whitney R-4360 Wasp Major 28-cylinder air-cooled radial piston engines, 3,000 hp (2,200 kW) each
- Propellers: 4-bladed Hamilton Standard, 17 ft 2 in (5.23 m) diameter constant-speed propellers

Performance

- Cruise speed: 250 mph (400 km/h, 220 kn)
- Range: 3,000 mi (4,800 km, 2,600 nmi)
- Service ceiling: 20,900 ft (6,400 m)

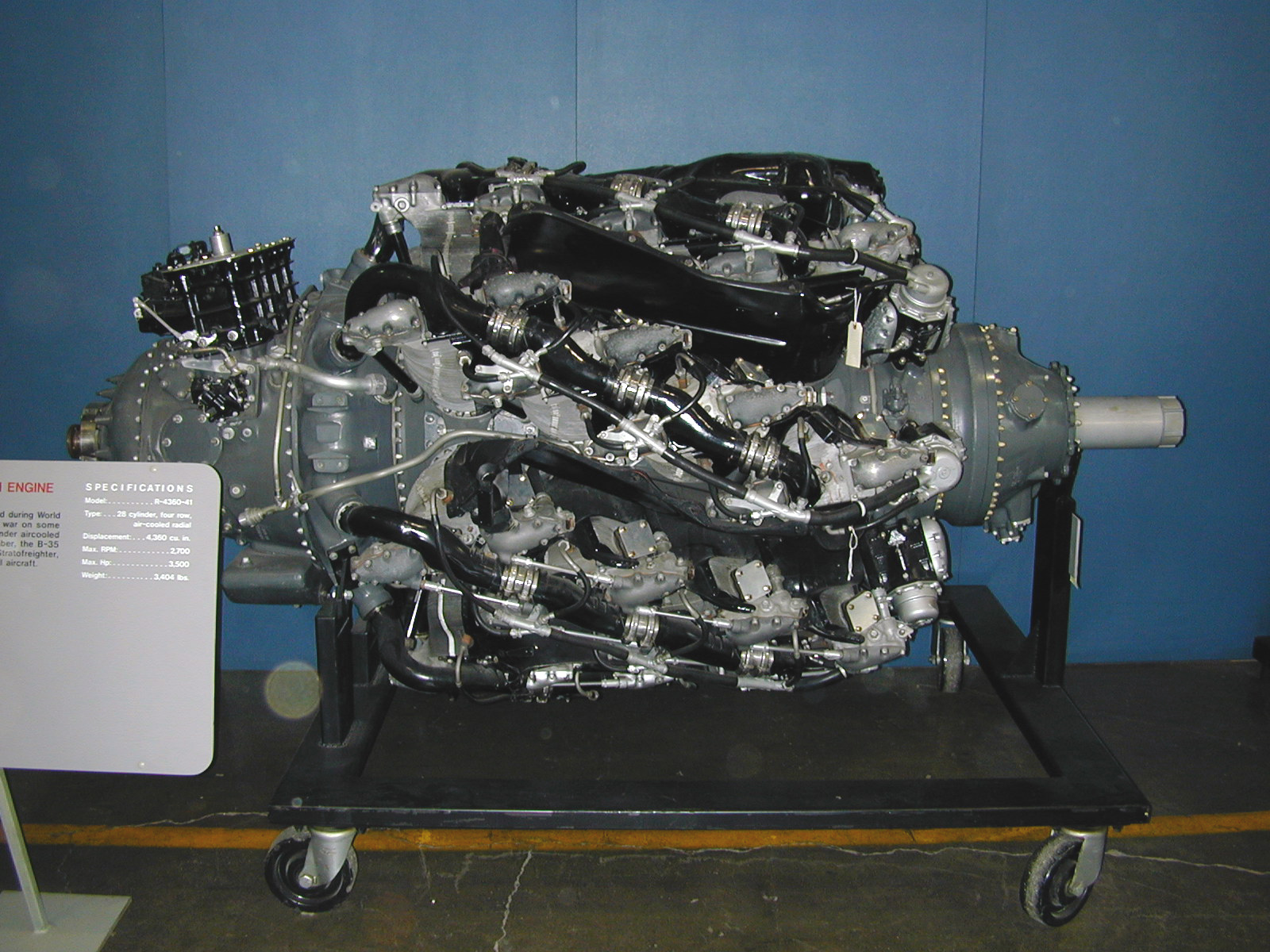
Pratt & Whitney R-4360 Wasp Major engine

== See also ==
- Charles M. Olmsted
- Ground effect vehicle
- Koolhoven – concept 100 ton (224,000 lb) flying boat

Aircraft of comparable role, configuration, and era

- Blohm & Voss BV 238 (Large WW2 flying boat)
- Blohm & Voss P 200 (Large WW2 flying boat design)
- Latécoère 631 (Large airliner flying boat)
- Martin JRM Mars (Largest Allied flying boat to enter service in WW2)
- Saunders-Roe Princess (Post-war large airliner flying boat)

Related lists

- List of large aircraft
