= Hughes Airport (California) =

US private airport operating 1940–1985

Coordinates: 33.975000°N 118.417000°W

- “Aerial photograph of Hughes Airport, Culver City, California, circa early 1960s”
- IATA: none; ICAO: CL71; FAA LID: CL71

Summary
- Airport type: Private
- Owner: Howard Hughes
- Operator: Hughes Aircraft Company
- Location: current day Playa Vista, Los Angeles
- Opened: 1943
- Closed: 1986
- Time zone: PST (-8:00)
  - Summer (DST): PDT (-7:00)
- Elevation AMSL: 75 ft / 23 m

Maps
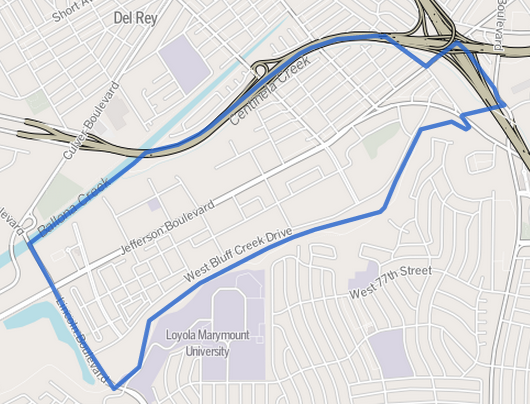
- The neighborhood in which the majority of the Hughes Airport used to be; location of the runway is just south of where current day Jefferson Blvd runs

- Location of the former Hughes Airport in Western Los Angeles

Runways
Direction	Length		Surface
Direction	ft	m	Surface
23/5	8,800	2,682	Asphalt

The Hughes Airport (IATA: CVR) was a private airport owned by Howard Hughes for the Hughes Aircraft Company. It was located just north of the Westchester bluffs and district of Los Angeles, California, from 1940 until its closure in 1985. It was directly south of and along Jefferson Boulevard and Ballona Creek, the location of the present-day neighborhood of Playa Vista.

== History ==
In 1940, Howard Hughes bought 380 acres (150 ha) of the Ballona wetlands south of Jefferson Avenue in south-west Culver City. A total of 9,600 feet (2,900 m) were available for a runway and an unpaved runway 23/5 was operational in 1943. In 1948, 6,800 feet (2,100 m) were paved with asphalt, extended by 1962 to 8,800 feet (2,700 m).

Takeoffs to the west had to be coordinated with nearby Los Angeles International Airport. The field served a number of aircraft and helicopter development projects of the Hughes Aircraft Co. and Hughes Tool Company (Summa Corporation).

At one time, according to Noah Dietrich, it "was the longest runway on the West Coast."

== Spruce Goose ==
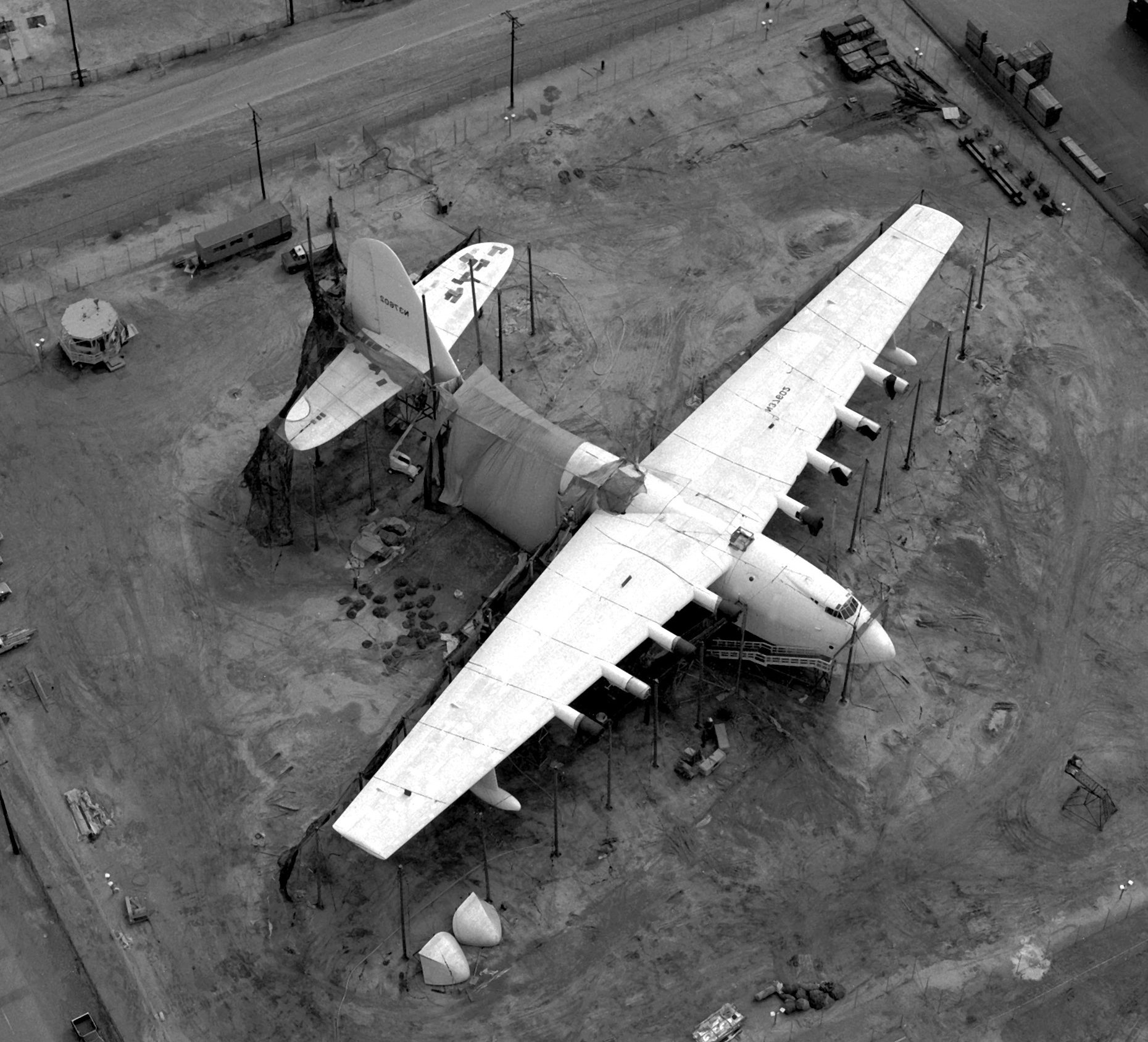
H4 Hercules pictured in 1982

The "Spruce Goose", officially known as the Hughes H-4 Hercules, was built here and moved in sections to the Port of Long Beach where it was re-assembled and made its first and only flight. Afterward, a climate controlled hangar was built there, where it remained until 1980 when it was acquired by the Aero Club of Southern California, which put it on display under a large dome next to the Queen Mary until 1988 when it was sold to the Evergreen Aviation Museum where it sits today. A full-time crew of 300 workers, all sworn to secrecy, maintained the plane in flying condition in a climate-controlled hangar at the Port of Long Beach location. The crew was reduced to 50 workers in 1962 and then disbanded after Hughes's death in 1976.

By the mid-1990s, the former Hughes Aircraft hangars here, including the one that held the Hercules, were converted into sound stages. Scenes from movies such as Titanic, What Women Want, and End of Days have been filmed in the 315,000-square-foot (29,300 m^{2}) aircraft hangar where Hughes created the flying boat. It also features in the computer game Crimson Skies. The hangar will be preserved as a structure eligible for listing on the National Register of Historic Buildings.

== Current usage ==
The former Hughes Airport is currently occupied by the Playa Vista development.
