= Only You (2015 film) =

- Theatrical poster
- Directed by: Zhang Hao
- Screenplay by: Zhao Shuo
- Story by: Diane Drake
- Produced by: Feng Xiaogang; Wang Zhonglei
- Starring: Tang Wei; Liao Fan
- Cinematography: Shu Chou
- Production companies: Huayi Brothers; Columbia Pictures; Heyi Pictures
- Release date: July 24, 2015 (China)
- Running time: 113 minutes
- Country: China
- Language: Mandarin
- Box office: US$10.7 million

Only You (Chinese: 命中注定) is a 2015 Chinese romantic comedy film directed by Zhang Hao and starring Tang Wei and Liao Fan. The film is a remake of 1994's Only You that starred Marisa Tomei and Robert Downey Jr. The film was released on July 24, 2015.

== Cast ==
- Tang Wei as Fang Yuan
- Liao Fan as Feng Dali
- Su Yan as Li Xiaotang
- Fang Fang
- Liu Tao
- Xie Dongshen

== Reception ==
=== Critical response ===
On the review aggregator website Rotten Tomatoes, the film has a 25% approval rating, based on 8 reviews, with an average rating of 4.9/10.

=== Box office ===
On the first weekend, the first grossed RMB47.5 million (US$7.64 million).
