= Only You (1994 film) =

Film by Norman Jewison

- Theatrical release poster
- Directed by: Norman Jewison
- Written by: Diane Drake
- Produced by: Norman Jewison; Cary Woods; Robert N. Fried; Charles Mulvehill
- Starring: Marisa Tomei; Robert Downey Jr.; Bonnie Hunt; Joaquim de Almeida; Fisher Stevens
- Cinematography: Sven Nykvist
- Edited by: Stephen Rivkin
- Music by: Rachel Portman
- Production companies: TriStar Pictures; Fried/Woods Films; Yorktown Productions
- Distributed by: Sony Pictures Releasing
- Release date: October 7, 1994
- Running time: 109 minutes
- Country: United States
- Language: English
- Box office: $20.1 million

Only You is a 1994 American romantic comedy film directed by Norman Jewison and starring Marisa Tomei, Robert Downey Jr., Bonnie Hunt, Joaquim de Almeida, and Fisher Stevens. Written by Diane Drake and Malia Scotch Marmo (uncredited), the film is about a young woman whose search for the man she believes to be her soulmate leads her to Italy where she meets her destiny.

The film was released in the United States on October 7, 1994, by Sony Pictures Releasing goes through the label of TriStar Pictures. It received mixed reviews, but critics praised Tomei's and Downey's performances, and grossed $20.1 million.

== Plot ==
After playing with a Ouija board with her brother Larry, 11-year-old Faith Corvatch becomes convinced that her soulmate, the man she is destined to be with, is named "Damon Bradley". This belief is strengthened when a few years later, a carnival fortune-teller tells her that "Damon Bradley" is the name of the man she will marry.

Fourteen years later, Faith, now 25, is a teacher at a Catholic school and is engaged to a podiatrist. Ten days before the wedding, Faith learns that her fiancé's high-school classmate, Damon Bradley, is flying to Venice that day. Determined to meet him, Faith follows his trail with her sister-in-law and childhood best friend, Kate, who is experiencing turbulence in her marriage and looking for a getaway as well, from Pittsburgh through Venice and the Italian countryside to a street-side restaurant in Rome, but they keep missing him.

Faith meets a young American man, but has no interest until he identifies himself as Damon Bradley. They spend a romantic evening together and fall hopelessly in love. He later reveals that his actual name is Peter Wright, so she angrily leaves him and prepares to fly back home. Meanwhile, a suave Italian businessman named Giovanni has been wooing Kate.

The next morning, Peter tells Faith he searched for Damon overnight, discovering he has moved on to Positano. Giovanni offers to drive the three Americans there. At a lavish hotel, Faith meets Damon, a handsome playboy, and invites him to dinner. Peter spies on them until Damon makes unwelcome sexual advances on Faith. It transpires that this "Damon" is actually a friend of Peter's who has helped stage the entire scene.

Back in the United States, Larry discovers that his wife, Kate, is in Italy. He travels there to find her while Kate and Faith are again planning to return home. Larry arrives in time to make up with Kate. He also reveals to her that he intentionally spelled out the name "Damon Bradley" on the Ouija board as a prank, and then paid the fortune-teller to tell Faith that her true love had the same name. He refuses to tell her the truth because he fears she would never speak to him again.

Faith and Peter are at the airport when they hear Damon Bradley paged. At the information desk, they finally meet Damon. Peter tells him why Faith has been following him, and also that he (Peter) is in love with her, then boards his flight home to Boston. Damon asks Faith if she loves Peter. She realizes that she does and rushes to join him on his plane. The airport staff delays the flight until she can board. She and Peter embrace and kiss as the passengers and crew applaud.

== Cast ==
- Marisa Tomei as Faith Corvatch
  - Tammy Minoff as young Faith Corvatch
- Robert Downey Jr. as Peter Wright
- Bonnie Hunt as Kate Corvatch
  - Jessica Hertel as young Kate Corvatch
- Joaquim de Almeida as Giovanni
- Fisher Stevens as Larry Corvatch
  - Harry Barandes as young Larry Corvatch
- Billy Zane as Harry / false Damon Bradley
- Adam LeFevre as Damon Bradley
- John Benjamin Hickey as Dwayne, Faith's fiancé
- Siobhan Fallon as Leslie
- Antonia Rey as fortune teller
- Phyllis Newman as Faith's mother
- Denise Du Maurier as Dwayne's mother
- Barbara Cupisti as Anna

== Production ==
Filming locations in the United States included Chicago Studio City in Austin, Chicago, and Pittsburgh and West Mifflin in Pennsylvania.

Italy scenes were shot on location in Rome, Venice, San Gimignano, Monteriggioni and Positano. Rome locations included the piazza at the Basilica di Santa Maria in Trastevere, Tiber Island, the piazza and column outside San Bartolomeo all'Isola, the Pons Fabricius northeast of Tiber Island, Esquiline Hill, the Fountain of Neptune at Piazza Navona, and the fountain at the south end of Via del Mascherone near Via Giulia. Positano locations included the Hotel Le Sirenuse at via Cristoforo Colombo in Positano (where they meet Billy Zane's character at the pool) and the Hotel Danieli in Venice.

== Reception ==
=== Box office ===
The film opened at number three at the North American box office, making $5.7 million on its opening weekend, and grossed $20.1 million in the United States and Canada.

=== Critical response ===
Upon its theatrical release, Only You received mixed reviews. In his review in the Chicago Sun-Times, Roger Ebert gave the film three and a half out of four stars, calling it "an endangered species in today's Hollywood."

It is total fantasy, light as a feather, contrary to all notions of common sense, it features a couple of stars who are really good kissers—and it takes place mostly in Venice, Rome, and the glorious Italian hillside town of Positano. What more do you want? Movies like this were once written for Katharine Hepburn (Summertime), Audrey Hepburn (Roman Holiday) and Rossano Brazzi (Three Coins in the Fountain). Or remember Clark Gable and Sophia Loren in It Happened in Naples? There is a case to be made that no modern actors have quite the innocence or the faith to play such heedless lovers, but Marisa Tomei and Robert Downey Jr. somehow manage to lose all the baggage of our realistic, cynical age, and give us a couple of fools in love.

Ebert singled out Tomei's performance as particularly noteworthy.

I can think of many angst-laden young Hollywood stars, many of them accomplished actors, who could not have come within miles of the work done by Downey and Tomei in this movie. There is craft involved, yes, and even a certain inspiration, but what I reacted to more strongly was an ineffable sense of good nature: Tomei and Downey seem happy in their being here, and happier together than apart. That is what must be present if we're to respond to a story like this.

In her review in The New York Times, Janet Maslin called the film "frankly touristy" and Jewison's directorial approach "cornball". Maslin was even less impressed with Tomei's performance, calling her "the least convincing actress ever to pretend to teach school." Maslin acknowledged Sven Nykvist's "picturesque" cinematography, Milena Canonero's "slinky, glamorous costumes", and Diane Drake's "rather sweet" screenplay.

In his review in The Washington Post, Desson Thomson wrote, "Jewison directs Only You with sure, comic instinct." He singled out Bonnie Hunt's performance, noting, "Jewison's best asset of all is Hunt, an adroit comedian whose retorts and mannerisms—as she helps her friend along in this wacky mess—are priceless."

Thomson's colleague at The Washington Post, Rita Kempley, was unimpressed with Tomei's performance:

Tomei is lovely in her gamin way, but she brings neither weight to the screen nor complexity to the insipidly drawn role of this postmodern Cinderella. Downey, feverish as the infatuated puppy-lover, actually carries the story through to its happy conclusion. Bonnie Hunt brings regret, rage and wit to the role of the underappreciated wife, who despite pie in her eye and a willing Latin lover boy, remains faithful to her husband in Pittsburgh. Alas, that's amore.

In his review for Reel Views, James Berardinelli wrote that Tomei and Downey "don't fully connect" and that the film is "entertaining without being exceptionally accomplished." Berardinelli called the film "essentially a light, inoffensive movie that will appeal to those who aren't seeking more than a bubbly romance."

In his DVD review for Movie.net, John J. Puccio wrote, "What every good romantic comedy demands are two beautiful people, usually of opposite sexes, beautiful scenery, beautiful music, and beautifully written situations. Never mind that director Norman Jewison's previous hit comedy, Moonstruck, didn't quite fit the mold. Only You does." Puccio called the film "one of the most charming films to come along since, well, since Moonstruck. On DVD it is beautiful just to look at. ... The scenery alone is worth the price of the DVD. The gorgeous photography and the crystal clarity of the images make widescreen viewing a must."

On the review aggregator website Rotten Tomatoes, the film holds an approval rating of 54% based on 35 reviews, with an average rating of 5.6/10. Audiences surveyed by CinemaScore gave the film a grade A− on scale of A to F.

=== Year-end lists ===
- 5th worst – Bob Strauss, Los Angeles Daily News

== Soundtrack ==
Only You

Soundtrack album by Rachel Portman
- Released: 1994
- Recorded: 1994
- Genres: Orchestral; Popular
- Labels: Columbia, Sony
- Producers: Rachel Portman, Michael Bolton (track 16), Walter Afanasieff (track 16)

The original soundtrack for Only You was released in 1994 by Columbia Records. The album contains original music by Rachel Portman, classical Italian music, and pop songs by Michael Bolton.

1. "Only You (And You Alone)" by Louis Armstrong (3:12)
2. "Written in the Stars" by Ezio Pinza (1:15)
3. "Some Enchanted Evening" by Ezio Pinza (3:01)
4. "I'm Coming with You" by Peter De Sotto and Quartetto Gelato (2:21)
5. "Venice" by Peter De Sotto and Quartetto Gelato (1:51)
6. "O Sole Mio" by Peter De Sotto and Quartetto Gelato (3:10)
7. "La traviata: Libiamo Ne' Lieti Calici" by Agnes Baltsa, José Carreras, London Symphony Orchestra and Plácido Domingo, conductor (2:57)
8. "Lost in Tuscany" by Quartetto Gelato (2:29)
9. "Arriving at Damon's Restaurant" by Quartetto Gelato (1:39)
10. "Running After Damon" by Quartetto Gelato (0:58)
11. "Gypsy Blessing" by Quartetto Gelato (3:21)
12. "Positano" by Quartetto Gelato (1:45)
13. "Quartet in B flat major: Rondo, Tempo Di Minuetto" by Quartetto Gelato (4:54)
14. "Do You Love Him?" by Quartetto Gelato (3:16)
15. "Theme from Only You" by Quartetto Gelato (3:34)
16. "Once in a Lifetime" by Michael Bolton (5:55)

The following additional music appeared in the film but does not appear on the soundtrack CD.

1. "On the Beautiful Blue Danube" - Johann Strauss
2. "Swing City" - Richard Iacona
3. "Sloe Gin Fizz" - Richard Iacona
4. "Rondo" by Quartetto Gelato
5. "Hallelujah Chorus" (George Frideric Handel) by Andrew Davis and The Toronto Symphony Orchestra
6. "Amore Contro" by Eros Ramazzotti
7. "Overture From La Forza Del Destino" - Giuseppe Verdi
8. "Livin' in the Streets" by Kirk Whalum
9. "Senza Perderci Di Vista" by Eros Ramazzotti

== Novelization ==
A novelization was published in 1994 by Bantam Books, written by romance author Fayrene Preston.

== Remake ==
A Chinese remake also titled Only You was released on July 24, 2015. It stars Tang Wei and Liao Fan.
