= Playa Vista, Los Angeles =

Neighborhood in California, US

Playa Vista
- Neighborhood of Los Angeles
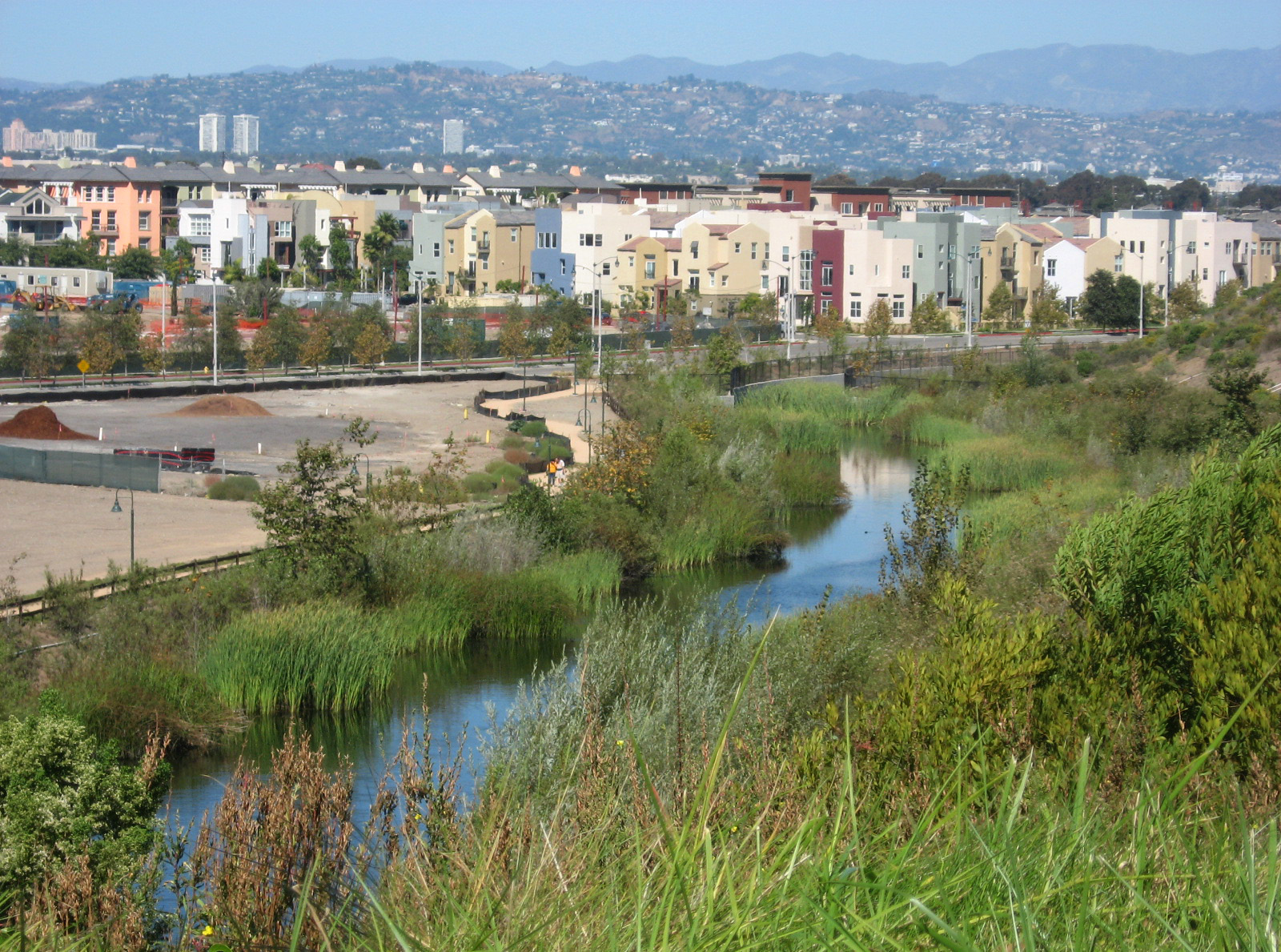
- Playa Vista from the south, with Bluff Creek in foreground

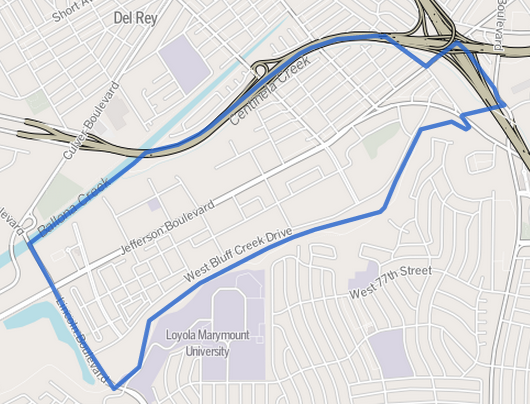
- Playa Vista neighborhood as mapped by the Los Angeles Times

- Location within Western Los Angeles
- Coordinates: 33°58′44″N 118°24′53″W
- Country: United States
- State: California
- County: Los Angeles
- City: Los Angeles
- ZIP Code: 90094

Playa Vista is a neighborhood in the Westside area of Los Angeles, California, United States. The area was the headquarters of Hughes Aircraft Company from 1941 to 1985 and the site of the construction of the Hughes H-4 Hercules "Spruce Goose" aircraft. The area began development in 2002 as a planned community with residential, commercial, and retail components. The community attracted businesses in technology, media and entertainment and is part of Silicon Beach.

== History ==
=== Tongva Native Americans ===
The Tongva inhabited the location now occupied by Playa Vista at the village of Guashna. A Tongva sacred burial site is located here: "about 1,000 Native American remains ... had been exhumed during construction," grave sites that were deemed sacred by the Tongva people. The remains were discovered after construction began. In 2008, the remains "were laid to rest and covered with white seashells during a sacred burial ceremony near the Westchester bluffs." Playa Vista planned a museum to educate people about the Ballona wetlands and the Gabrieliño-Tongva tribe. The Westchester/Playa Vista Discovery Center opened in 2020, which features a small monument.

=== Port Ballona ===
In 1839 the land was part of Rancho La Ballona, later in 1887, it became part of the Port Ballona.

=== Ballona Creek Watershed ===
Prior to its development as headquarters for Hughes Aircraft Company, much of the land occupied by Playa Vista was a wetlands connected with a large salt-marsh in what is now Marina Del Rey. These wetlands were formerly part of the larger Ballona Creek watershed that occupied these areas along with what is now Playa Del Rey, and much of Venice, Los Angeles.

=== Howard Hughes ===
In the 1940s, the aviator Howard Hughes bought the site and constructed a private airfield, named Hughes Airport, and an aircraft factory with large hangars for his Hughes Aircraft Company production. The famous Spruce Goose (Hughes H-4 Hercules plane), with the largest wingspan and height of any aircraft in history, was built in the hangar and then transported to Long Beach Harbor for its only flight in 1947.

== Development ==
=== Prior efforts ===
During the late 1990s, DreamWorks failed in its attempt to build a studio in Playa Vista.

=== New project ===
Phase One of Playa Vista began in 2001 as "a mix of affordable and luxury housing, office and commercial space and open spaces and recreational amenities, all set next to a restored wetlands and wildlife preserve." In October, Steve Soboroff was named president of Playa Vista.

It was one of "six communities in the nation selected by President Bill Clinton in 1998 as a National Pilot Project of the Partnership for Advancing Technology in Housing (PATH)." As such it is, "one of the most technologically advanced communities ever planned" and is "fully connected via telecommunications and broadband capabilities."

==== Environment ====
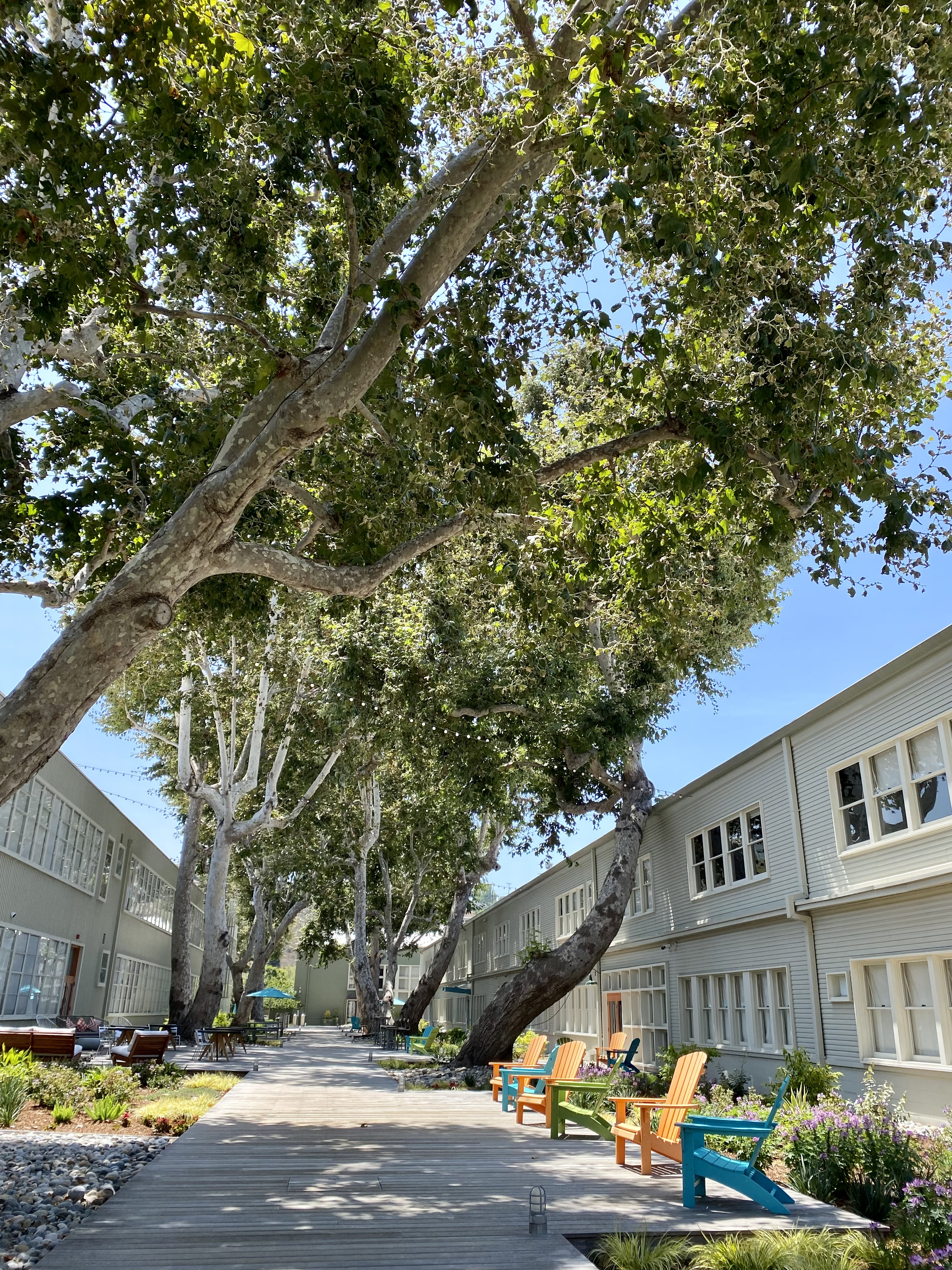
Allée of Western sycamore (Platanus racemosa) at Hercules East Campus

It was constructed as "a model for green development [using] energy saving systems, non-toxic and recycled materials, product selections and design techniques that promote conservation [thus] minimizing the impacts of development on the environment." However, some environmentalists and residents in the nearby communities of Mar Vista, Westchester, and Venice oppose the development arguing that it will increase traffic congestion throughout the Los Angeles Westside. Beginning in 1994, developers and some environmentalists worked together to restore the Ballona Wetlands. Other environmentalists, however, oppose development in the wetlands.

==== Methane ====
A controversy surrounding methane at Playa Vista developed around 2000. On April 17, 2000, Exploration Technologies (ETI), "found methane seeps much larger than any previously reported, one about 1,000 feet (300 m) long, and a second slightly smaller, in the area east of Lincoln Boulevard and south of Jefferson Boulevard." The City Council then asked Playa Vista to conduct more studies with ETI as a peer reviewer. This study found that ETI's original hypothesis (that a large fault was present and could cause a release of methane in an earthquake) was incorrect, and stated that a fault zone did not exist under Lincoln Boulevard. The study further showed that gas seepage from the southern California gas storage facility was not occurring. The report concluded that "no significant fault is possible under the entire Playa Vista development project site." In 2002, the Los Angeles Department of Building and Safety (LADBS) required the installation of gas mitigation systems at Playa Vista, consisting of a membrane shield under the buildings, vents, and a series of alarms.

According to officials at the L.A. Department of Building and Safety, "Methane is an old story in Los Angeles and the standards the city requires at Playa Vista are the strictest in the country. Hence, Playa residents we spoke to cited areas where the gas has not been mitigated - such as Venice, Santa Monica, and nearly all of the Westside - as more dangerous." Many also argue that "much of the methane is natural - not the kind that comes from the gas company."

The Los Angeles City Council has consistently voted in favor of the developers of the project. The development has a government-mandated blend of high- and low-income housing (less than 10%). According to the Los Angeles Times, "[o]ver the last decade, government agencies and courts have ruled repeatedly in Playa Vista's favor ... Engineers, builders and consultants for the project have joined the city of Los Angeles in saying the safety measures are the most elaborate the city has ever required."

==== Water conservation ====
Playa Vista's parks and landscaped areas are serviced with 100% recycled water.

== Geography ==
According to the Mapping L.A. project of the Los Angeles Times, Playa Vista is adjoined on the northwest by Del Rey, on the southwest by Playa del Rey, and on the southeast by Westchester, all neighborhoods of Los Angeles. It is bordered on the north and east by Culver City, and on the west by Marina del Rey. Playa Vista surrounds West Fox Hills, a small unincorporated area.

Street and other boundaries are: Ballona Creek or the Marina Freeway on the northwest and north, the Culver City boundary on the northeast, Bluff Creek Drive or the boundary between Rancho Ballona and Rancho Sausal Redondo on the southeast, followed by Teale Street and Cabora Drive, westerly and unmarked, to include the Ballona Wetlands on the southwest.

According to Google Maps, the boundaries of the currently developed portion are approximately Lincoln Boulevard and the Ballona Wetlands on the west, Ballona Creek on the north, Centinela Avenue on the east, and the Del Rey Hills bluffs (Westchester Bluffs) on the south. Playa Vista is bordered by the unincorporated enclave of Marina Del Rey to the northwest, by the community of Playa del Rey to the southwest, by Loyola Marymount University and the upland part of Westchester to the southwest, south, east and southeast, and by the Del Rey district to the northwest.

=== Playa Vista Riparian Corridor ===
Bluff Creek
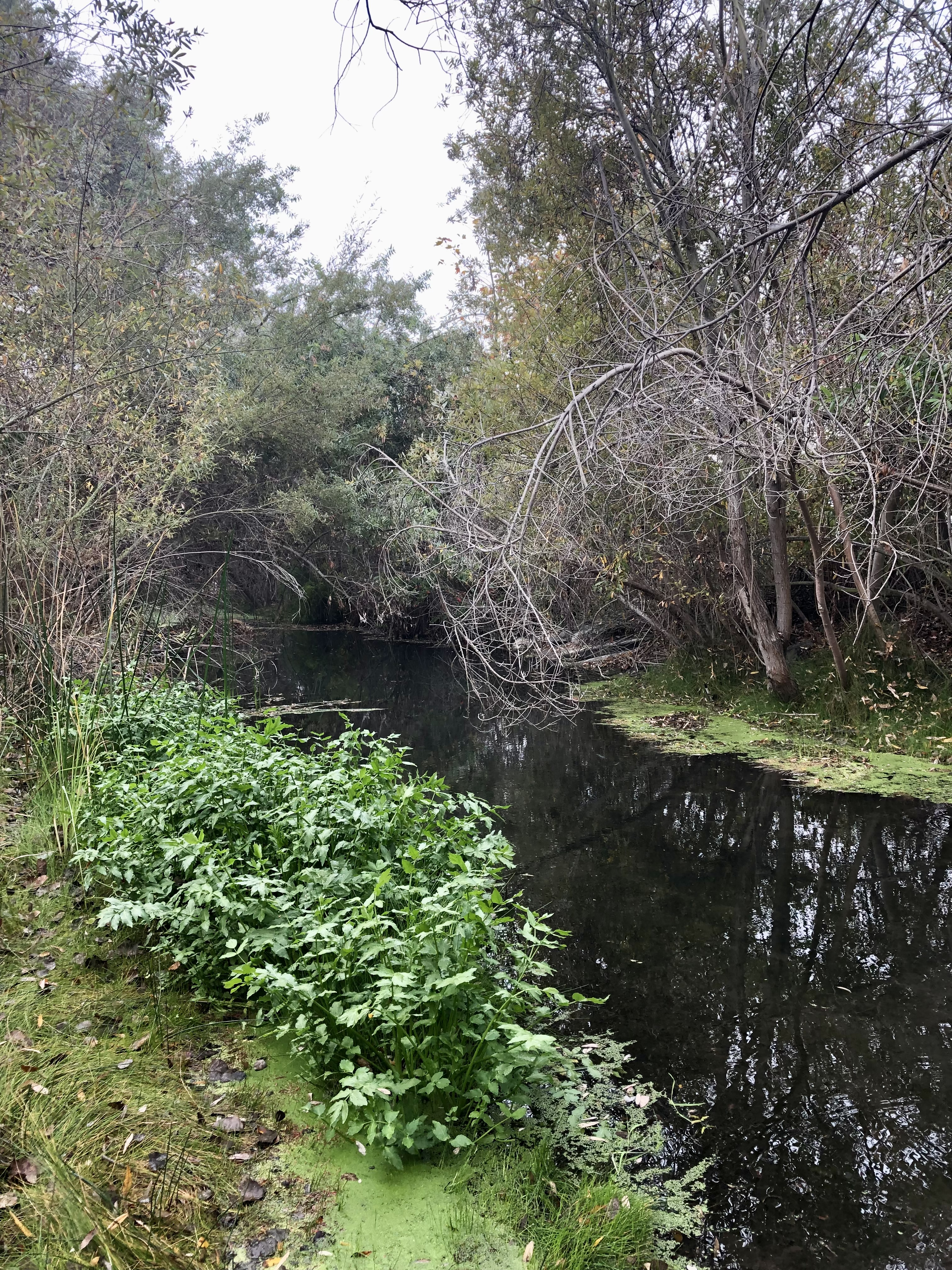
- Bluff Creek

Physical characteristics
- Source
  - coordinates: 33°58′54″N 118°24′07″W
- Mouth
  - coordinates: 33°57′57″N 118°25′38″W

Bluff Creek is a stream in Los Angeles County, California. It runs below the Westchester bluffs (Ballona Escarpment) and is considered a remnant or relic of the now-channelized Centinela Creek, a tributary of Ballona Creek. Bluff Creek is within the Playa Vista neighborhood and feeds the Freshwater Marsh of the Ballona Wetlands.

The Playa Vista Riparian Corridor, a popular spot for birdwatching and fitness, surrounds this creek. The cluster of three footpaths and maintenance roads clustered around Bluff Creek, at the base of the Westchester Bluffs, is a wildlife area associated with the larger Ballona Wetlands estuary and watershed.

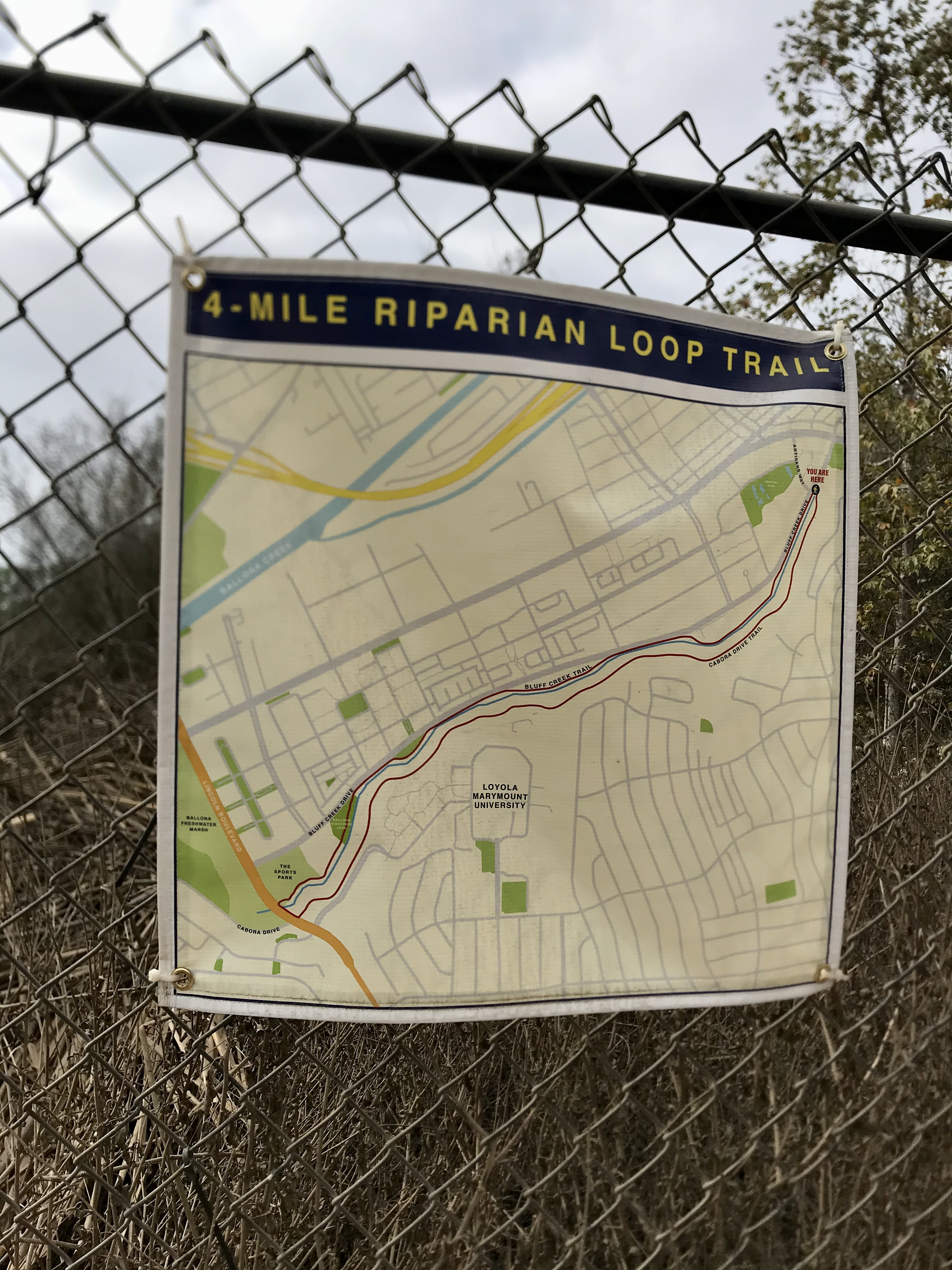
Trail map

The uppermost path, sometimes called the LMU Fire Road (a portion is legally Cabora Drive), is open to leashed dogs and is accessible from the residential neighborhood on the bluffs above via a long and steep paved ramp accessible at Altamoor & Dunbarton, as well as via Lincoln Blvd (west) and Bluff Creek Drive near Artisan Way (East). The central trail is a private maintenance road. The lowest road is a 2.5 miles (4.0 km) exercise track winding along Bluff Creek through Playa Vista passing multiple recreational areas including Ballona Discovery Park, which features outdoor exhibits describing the history and ecology of the area.

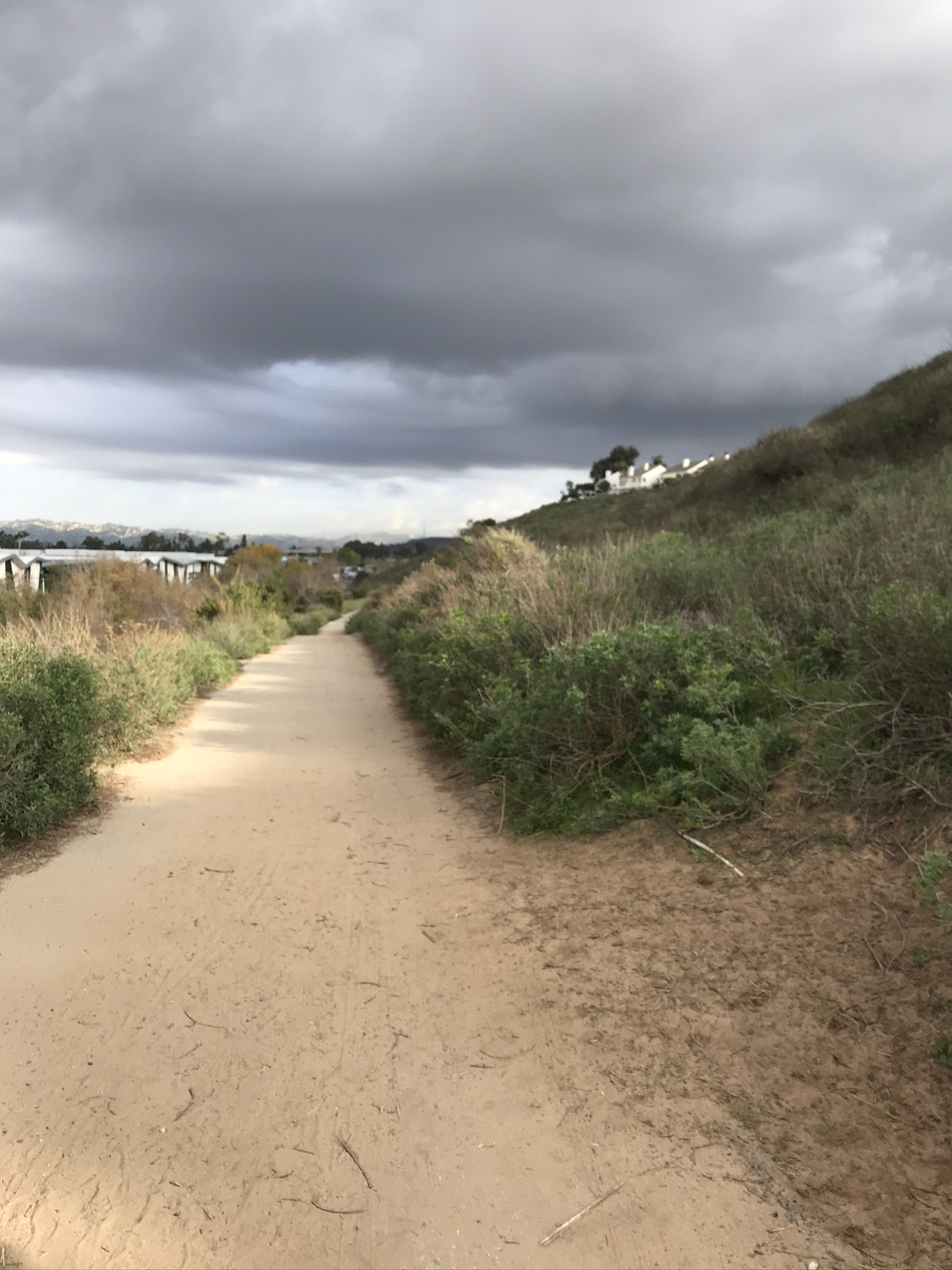
The LMU Fire Road along the Westchester Bluffs above Playa Vista is a popular jogging track.

== Demographics ==
The 2000 U.S. census counted 2,416 residents in the 1.3-square-mile (3.4 km^{2}) Playa Vista neighborhood—an average of 1,859 people per square mile (715 people per square kilometer), a very low population density in Los Angeles, but by 2008, the city estimated that the population had increased to 6,010. The median age for residents was 37, considered old for Los Angeles; the percentage of residents aged 65 and older was among the county's highest.

The neighborhood was highly diverse ethnically. The population was 34.8% Hispanic or Latino, 32.4% Non-Hispanic White, 21.2% Asian, 4.7% Black, and 6.9% of other origins. Mexico (36.2%) and Guatemala (16.5%) were the most common places of birth for the 31.1% of the residents who were born abroad, about an average figure in Los Angeles.

The median yearly household income in 2008 dollars was $68,597, a high figure for Los Angeles. The average household size of 2.4 people was average for the city. House- or apartment owners occupied 54.8% of the housing stock, and renters occupied 28.5%.

The percentages of divorced men and widowed men and women were among the county's highest. In 2000 there were 33 families headed by single parents, a low rate for Los Angeles. There were 215 veterans, or 11%, a high rate for Los Angeles.

== Economy ==
Commercial activity within Playa Vista:

- Electronic Arts, a Redwood City-based major developer, marketer, publisher and distributor of video games, operates a large branch campus in Playa Vista.
- Belkin, since February 2010, has its corporate headquarters in Playa Vista.
- Team One, a division of Saatchi & Saatchi, relocated its corporate headquarters to Playa Vista from nearby El Segundo in March 2013.
- ICANN relocated its corporate headquarters to Playa Vista from nearby Marina Del Rey in June 2012.
- Fullscreen relocated to the complex renamed i|o at Playa Vista from nearby Culver City in March 2015.
- Neo@Ogilvy, a subsidiary of one of the largest marketing communication companies in the world, Ogilvy & Mather, relocated to the i|o at Playa Vista from the Santa Monica Water Garden.

Area businesses:

- TBWA\Chiat\Day, the Los Angeles office of TBWA Worldwide, rents a 100,300-square-foot (9,320 m^{2}) building in Playa Vista.
- Deutsch Inc. – Los Angeles office of Deutsch Inc., a global creative ad agency
- Gehry Partners, LLP, the architectural firm of Frank Gehry
- TOMS – headquarters of the philanthropic company known for shoes, eyewear, and coffee products
- Rubicon HQ – Los Angeles office of Rubicon
- Facebook LA – Los Angeles office of Facebook
- Microsoft – Los Angeles office of Microsoft
- The Honest Company – head office; founded by Jessica Alba
- YouTube Space LA – Los Angeles office of YouTube
- CTRL Collective – Playa Vista location, a coworking facility for entrepreneurs and innovators
- BEZALEL – headquarters of wireless charging technology company Bezalel Inc.
- Rooster Teeth – Los Angeles office of Rooster Teeth
- MERRY JANE – headquarters of cannabis lifestyle-media company co-founded by Snoop Dogg and Ted Chung
- IMAX Corporation – office in Los Angeles of theatre, camera, and projection company
- Santa Monica Studio – Sony Interactive Entertainment game development studio
- Treyarch – Activision game development studio

Other related activity:

- The Institute for Creative Technologies (ICT), a research institute of the University of Southern California (USC), is located in Playa Vista. Established in 1999, the ICT combines the assets of a major research university with the creative resources of Hollywood and the game industry to advance the state-of-the-art in training and simulation.

== Facilities ==
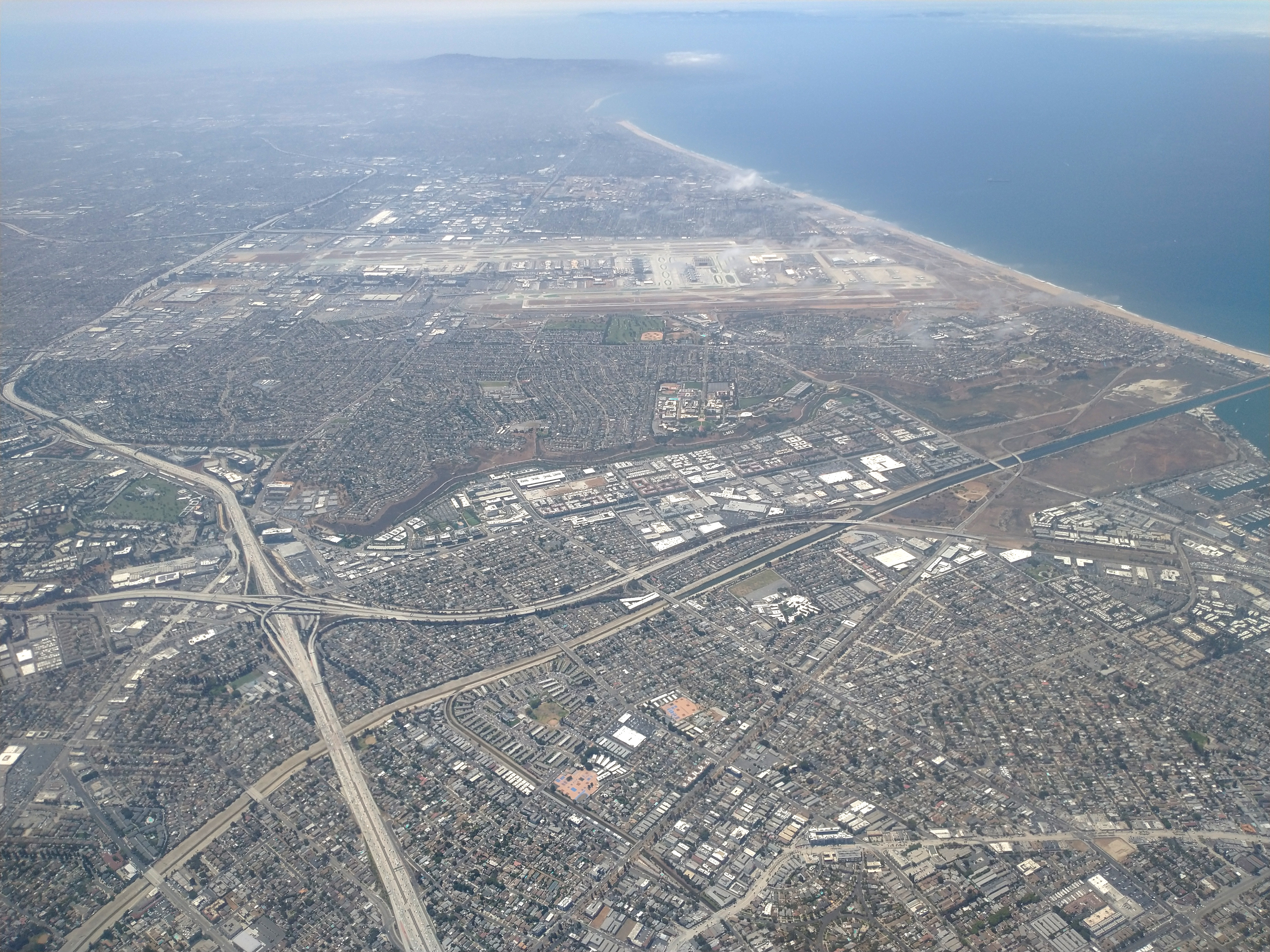
Los Angeles International Airport and surrounding areas, July 2021. Playa Vista is in the center of the photo just above where the freeways cross.

=== City ===
- The Los Angeles Police Department operates the Pacific Community Police Station at 12312 Culver Boulevard, 90066, serving the neighborhood.
- The Los Angeles Public Library operates the new Playa Vista Branch Library with a community meeting room and public Wifi.

=== Parks ===
- Parks: Neighborhood parks, sports fields, and regional hiking parks are in and adjacent to Playa Vista.

- Playa Vista Dog Park
- Playa Vista Sports Park
- Fountain Park At Playa Vista
- Playa Vista Central Park
- Ballona Creek bicycle path
- Ballona Discovery Park
- Concert Park
- Central Park includes a bandshell and athletic facilities.

=== Other ===
- The Honey Training Center exists in the 'Campus' area. Until 2024, it was the training center for the Los Angeles Clippers, a professional basketball team. Some Clippers players live in or near Playa Vista.

== Education ==
Los Angeles Unified School District operates public schools.

- Playa del Rey Elementary School is within the Playa Vista community.
- Playa Vista Elementary School

Los Angeles Public Library operates the Playa Vista Branch Library.

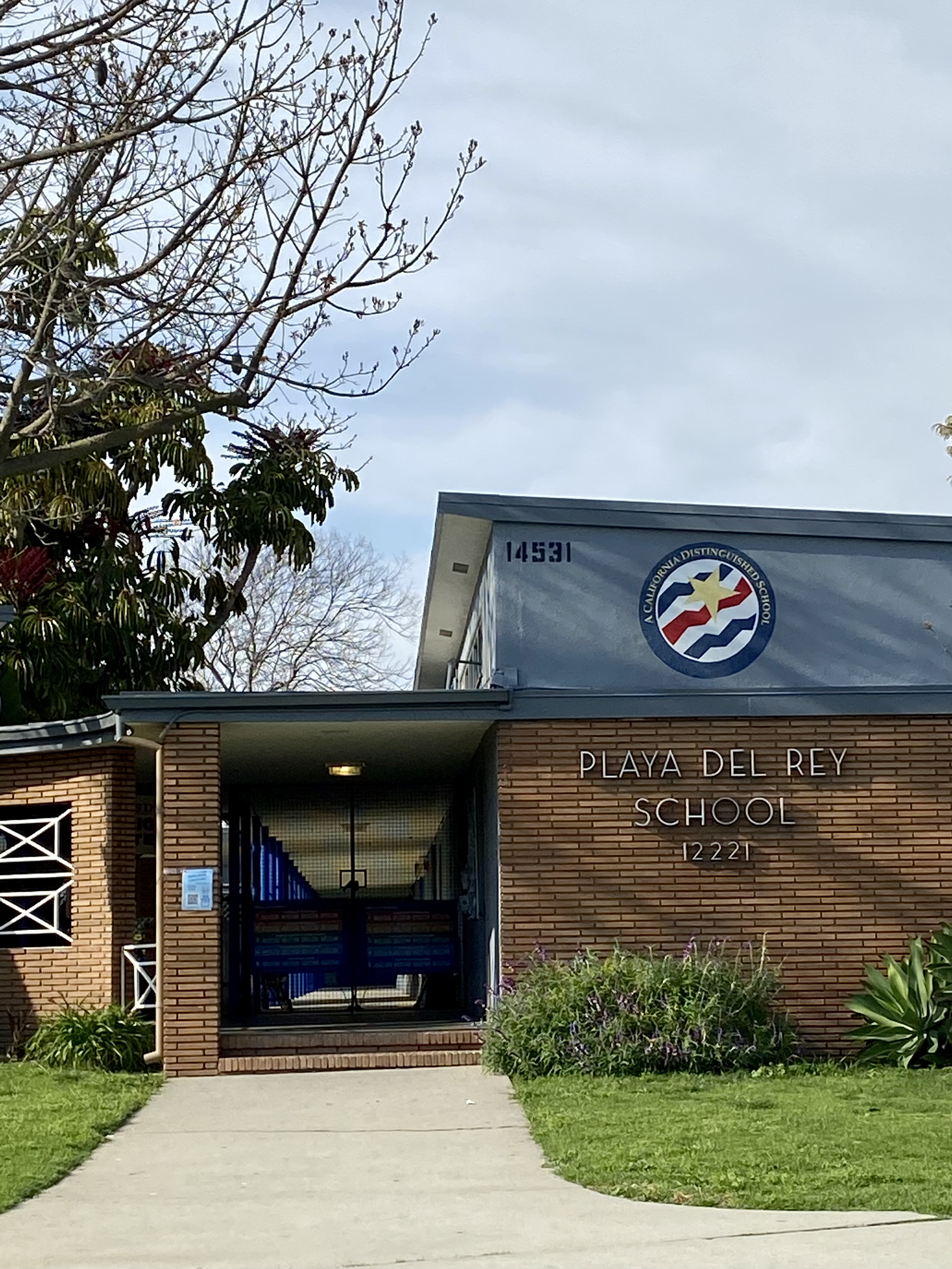
Playa del Rey Elementary School

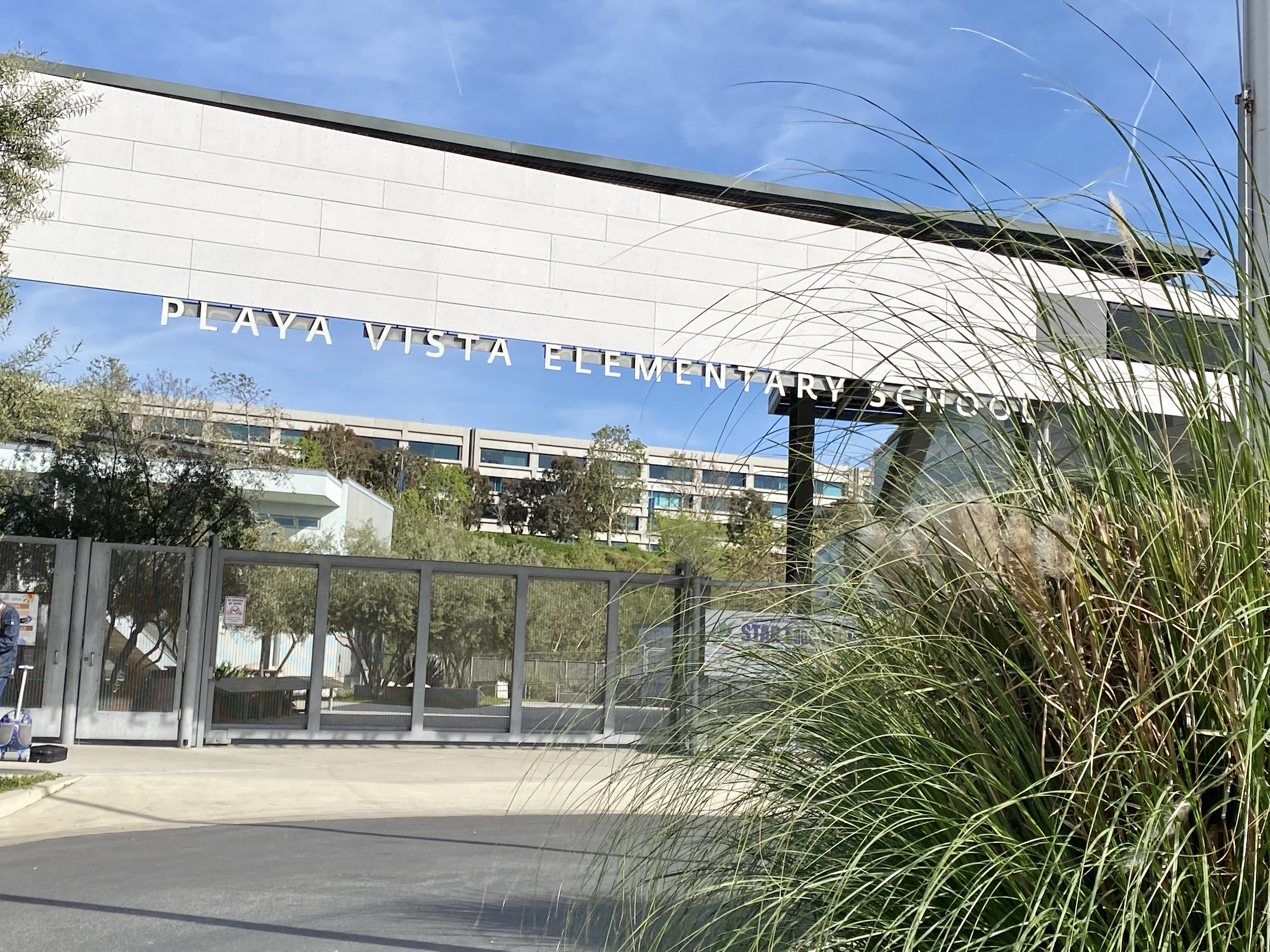
Playa Vista Elementary School

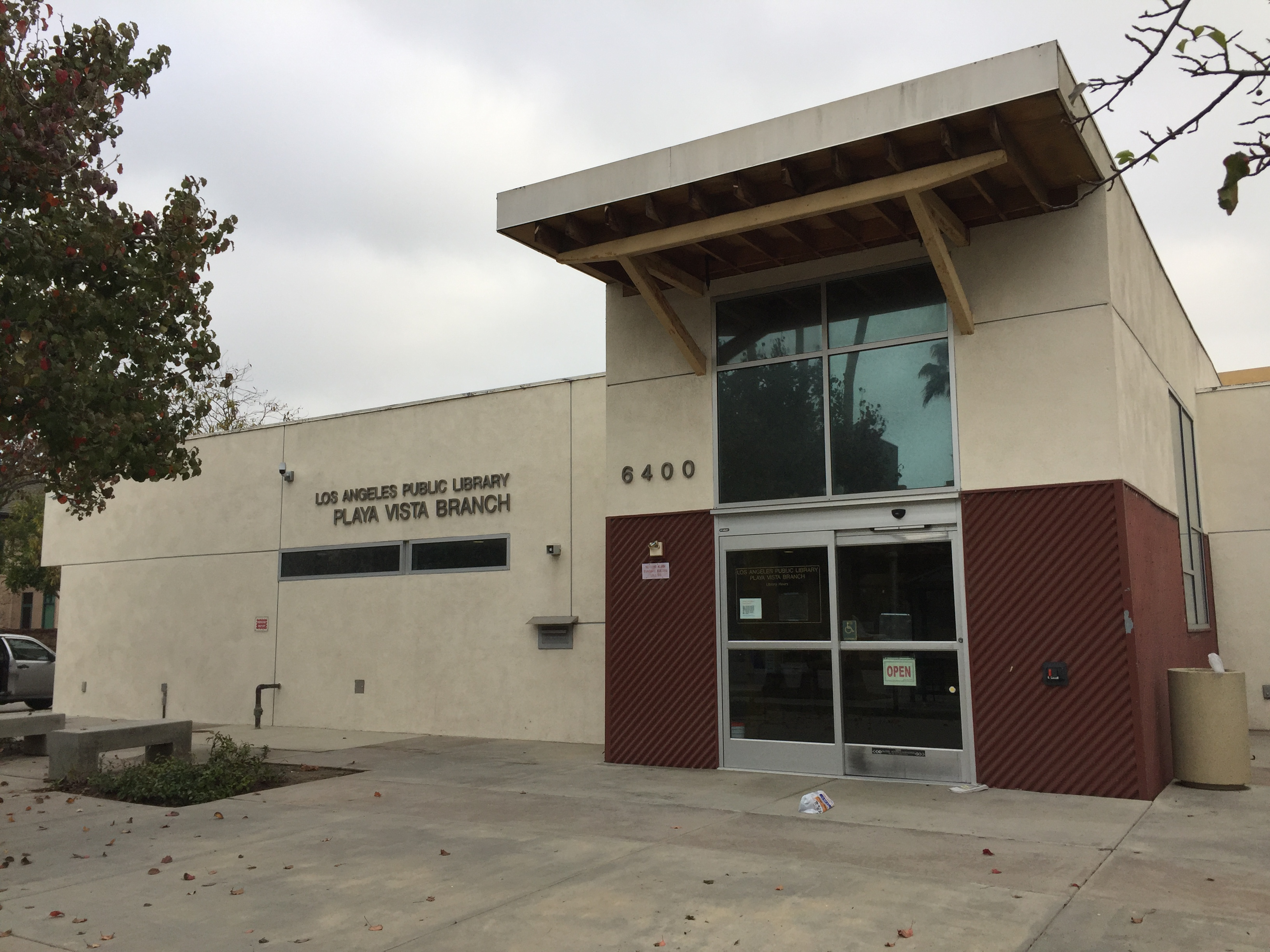
Playa Vista Branch Library
