= Partnership for Advancing Technology in Housing =

Partnership for Advancing Technology in Housing (PATH) is a "public/private sector initiative." The United States Department of Housing and Urban Development is responsible for its management. Its activities are coordinated by HUD's Office of Policy Development and Research (PD&R). PATH's goals are to improve "the development, dissemination, and use of new housing technologies."

PATH developed during the Clinton Administration:

the White House convened representatives from all segments of America's construction industry to consider a broad set of National Construction Goals. Over the next three years, the residential segment of the construction industry, represented by homebuilders, code officials, product manufacturers, and other interested parties, developed a research plan for implementing National Construction Goals for the housing sector. PATH is the outgrowth of those proposals [...] PATH was officially launched on May 4, 1998.

HUD lists the goals of PATH as seeking to:

expand the development and utilization of new technologies in order to make American homes stronger, safer and more durable; more energy efficient and environmentally friendly; easier to maintain and less costly to operate; and more comfortable and exciting to live in.

== See also ==
- Playa Vista, Los Angeles, California
