= What Men Want =

2019 American film by Adam Shankman

- Theatrical release poster
- Directed by: Adam Shankman
- Screenplay by: Tina Gordon; Alex Gregory; Peter Huyck
- Story by: Tina Gordon; Jas Waters
- Based on: What Women Want by Josh Goldsmith; Cathy Yuspa; Diane Drake
- Produced by: James Lopez; Will Packer
- Starring: Taraji P. Henson; Aldis Hodge; Richard Roundtree; Wendi McLendon-Covey; Tracy Morgan
- Cinematography: Jim Denault
- Edited by: Emma E. Hickox
- Music by: Brian Tyler
- Production companies: Will Packer Productions; BET Films; Paramount Players
- Distributed by: Paramount Pictures
- Release date: February 8, 2019 (United States)
- Running time: 117 minutes
- Country: United States
- Language: English
- Budget: $20 million
- Box office: $72.2 million

What Men Want is a 2019 American romantic fantasy comedy film directed by Adam Shankman and starring Taraji P. Henson, Aldis Hodge, Josh Brener, Erykah Badu, Richard Roundtree, and Tracy Morgan. The film is a loose remake of the 2000 film What Women Want. The plot follows a woman who, after drinking a potent concoction given by a shaman, gains the ability to hear men's inner thoughts. The screenplay was written by Jas Waters and Tina Gordon Chism.

The film was released in the United States on February 8, 2019, by Paramount Pictures. It grossed over $72 million worldwide. It received mixed reviews from critics, although Henson's performance was praised.

== Plot ==
Ali Davis is a successful sports agent in Atlanta, who feels boxed out by her male colleagues. When she is passed over for a promotion at Summit Worldwide Management, her boss Nick explains that she does not connect well with men. Determined to succeed in a man's world, Ali announces that she will sign up-and-coming basketball star Jamal Barry.

After getting drinks with her father, Ali flirts with the bartender, Will. They have sex at his home, where she encounters his young son, Ben, and sees a wedding photo. At a photo shoot, Ali stands up for her client, but angers Joe "Dolla" Barry, Jamal's father and manager.

At her friend Mari's bachelorette party, Ali is introduced to Sister, a psychic. To help her "connect with men", Sister gives her "fey lougawou" tea to drink. While dancing with her friends at a club, Ali is knocked unconscious.

Waking up, Ali hears the thoughts of her doctor and her assistant, Brandon, and she realize that she has gained the ability to hear men's thoughts. They track down Sister, who convinces Ali that her power is an asset. Using her newfound ability, she learns about a poker game attended by her fellow agents and Joe. She shows up uninvited, but impresses Joe, and is invited to join Summit's meeting with Jamal. Ali saves her coworker Kevin's pitch to Jamal and Joe; Kevin later confronts Ali and reveals that he had voted to make her partner.

Discerning that Joe does not trust a woman without a family, Ali passes off Will and Ben, who have come to return her misplaced driver's license, as her husband and son. When Ben reveals that his mother is dead, Ali invites them all to an NBA game, where, unbeknownst to Will or Ben, she uses her "family" to further impress Joe. On a double date with Will, Mari, and Mari's fiancé James, Ali hears James' thoughts, and also hears that Will only has thoughts for her. They have sex, with Ali using Will's thoughts to fully satisfy him.

The Summit office is shocked to discover that agent Ethan has quit and signed Jamal himself, withdrawing him from the NBA draft to play in China, instead. Nick berates Ali, stating that the only reason he will not fire her is because she is a black woman. He reveals her family charade to Will, who tells Ali to stay away from Ben and him. At Mari's wedding, Ali hears James' thoughts and angrily dismissing Brandon's attempt to intervene, she drunkenly announces that James slept with Mari's cousin Gabby. She also reveals that her friend Ciarra's husband is cheating on her, and a brawl breaks out. Ali is again knocked unconscious.

Ali wakes up at the hospital, realizing she can no longer read minds. With her father's advice, Ali reconciles with Brandon and her friends. She finds Jamal, who explains that he does not want to go to China, and Ali tells him to follow his heart. Jamal decides to stay, and becomes the first NBA draft pick. Ali is promoted to partner, but quits to start her own agency with Kevin, as well as Brandon, finally making him an agent. She asks Will for another chance, and he agrees. The three of them go for a walk as Ali reveals more plans for her agency.

== Cast ==
- Taraji P. Henson as Alison "Ali" Davis
- Aldis Hodge as Will Thomas
- Josh Brener as Brandon Wallace
- Erykah Badu as Sister
- Richard Roundtree as Skip Davis
- Tracy Morgan as Joe "Dolla" Barry
- Wendi McLendon-Covey as Olivia
- Tamala Jones as Mari
- Phoebe Robinson as Ciarra
- Max Greenfield as Kevin Myrtle
- Jason Jones as Ethan Fowler
- Chris Witaske as Eddie
- Brian Bosworth as Nick Ivers
- Kellan Lutz as "Captain F*cktastic"
- Shane Paul McGhie as Jamal Barry
- Pete Davidson as Danny
- Auston Jon Moore as Ben Thomas
- Ashani Roberts as Gabby
- Cristian Gonzalez as Louis

Cameo

- John Collins as Himself
- Shaquille O'Neal as Himself
- Grant Hill as Himself
- Mark Cuban as Himself
- Karl-Anthony Towns as Himself
- Lisa Leslie as Herself

== Production ==
In 2017, Paramount announced that it was fast-tracking a remake of the 2000 Nancy Meyers film What Women Want. On November 14, 2017, it was announced that Taraji P. Henson would star in the lead role. On February 2, 2018, Adam Shankman signed on to direct the film. Max Greenfield and Tracy Morgan were later added to the cast.

Brian Tyler composed the music in the film. The soundtrack released on Lakeshore Records features a string of hits by 1990s hip-hop music and R&B acts, such as Bell Biv DeVoe, Salt-N-Pepa, TLC, En Vogue and Destiny's Child.

Principal photography began in Atlanta in March 2018 and ended in June 2018.

== Release ==
What Men Want was released on Digital HD on April 23, 2019 and on Blu-ray and DVD on May 7, 2019.

== Reception ==
=== Box office ===
What Men Want grossed $54.6 million in the United States and Canada and $17.6 million in other territories, for a worldwide total of $72.2 million, against a production budget of $20 million.

In the United States and Canada, What Men Want was released on February 8, 2019, alongside The Lego Movie 2: The Second Part, Cold Pursuit and The Prodigy, and was projected to gross $18–20 million from 2,912 theaters in its opening weekend. It made $6.6 million on its first day (including $1.25 million from Thursday night previews). It went on to debut to $19 million, finishing second behind The Lego Movie 2. In its second weekend, the film grossed $10.9 million, finishing fourth, and then $5.2 million in its third weekend, finishing sixth.

=== Critical response ===
On review aggregator Rotten Tomatoes, the film has an approval rating of 41% based on 147 reviews, and an average rating of 5.1/10. The website's critical consensus reads, "Admittedly uneven but easy to like, What Men Want proves a gender-swapped remake can work – and the odds are substantially improved with Taraji P. Henson in the lead." On Metacritic, the film has a weighted average score of 49 out of 100, based on reviews from 29 critics, indicating "mixed or average reviews". Audiences polled by CinemaScore gave the film an average grade of "A−" on an A+ to F scale, while those at PostTrak gave it an 82% overall positive score and a 69% "definite recommend".

The Hollywood Reporter's Justin Lowe praised the film's pacing and jokes and said it featured a "predictably satisfying conclusion". Sonia Rao of The Washington Post gave the film two out of four stars, calling it a "so-so gender-flipped remake" and praising Henson's performance, while adding, "It would make a perfectly fine airplane movie. Or maybe save it for the bachelorette party." Helen O'Hara of Empire wrote "The storytelling is a little loose, but as a workplace comedy with a side-line in romance, this earns its laughs thanks to the immensely game Henson and a stellar supporting cast." Peter Travers of Rolling Stone gave it 2 out of 5, was critical of the script, "Henson looks ready to come out firing on all cylinders, but the comic cowardice of What Men Want leaves her shooting blanks." Variety's Owen Gleiberman compares the film to the original, saying that it was based on the idea that women are smarter than men believe, but the premise of the remake is that men are as bad or worse than the stereotypes, which he does not object to but says it "holds a distinct disadvantage as comedy" and that as a result the overheard thoughts lack "the snap of comic surprise".

== See also ==
- List of Black films of the 2010s
