= Diane Drake =

American screenwriter

- Born: Los Angeles, California, U.S.
- Education: University of California, San Diego
- Occupations: Screenwriter, teacher
- Writing career
- Language: English
- Years active: 1988-
- Subject: Communications/Visual Arts
- Notable works: Only You, What Women Want
- Website: dianedrake.com

Diane Drake is an American screenwriter and teacher, and former Vice President of Creative Affairs for Sydney Pollack's production company, Mirage Enterprises. She lives in Los Angeles and is best known for the films Only You and What Women Want.

== Early life ==
Drake was born and grew up in the San Fernando Valley of Los Angeles, California.

She studied Communications/Visual Arts at the University of California, San Diego.

== Career ==
Diane Drake worked for Sydney Pollack's production company, Mirage Enterprises, from 1988 to 1992, rising to the position of Vice President of Creative Affairs.

=== Writing ===
Drake began writing screenplays in 1991. Her first screenplay, Dog Meets Cat, though never more than optioned material, earned her a writing assignment with Hanna-Barbera. She worked on rewriting The Prince and the Pauper, with dogs, in a project that was never produced.

In 1992 she wrote a spec script called Him, which sold to TriStar Pictures for $1 million. It was produced in 1994 as Only You, starring Marisa Tomei and Robert Downey, Jr. The movie was remade in China by the Huayi Brothers in 2015.

In 1995 Drake wrote a spec script called Ladies Man, in which a male protagonist who works in advertising has a freak accident which gives him the ability to read women's thoughts. In November 1995, Caravan Pictures which was based at Hollywood Pictures, a division of Disney studios, optioned the script for 18 months.

According to the New York Post, Drake's agent, Justin Dardis of APA, sent Ladies Man to Nancy Meyers in 1996 as a writing sample. In 1999 Nancy Meyers rewrote a script by Josh Goldsmith and Cathy Yuspa, called Head Games, based on a pitch they sold to Touchstone—another division of the same studio that had bought Drake's script—in June, 1997, (nineteen months after Drake's original script had been optioned by the studio and one month after the studio's option on Drake's work had expired.) Head Games was developed with Todd Garner, who served as an executive under Joe Roth, co-owner of Caravan Pictures. Their work also had a male protagonist able to read women's thoughts. Meyers changed the title of Head Games to What Women Want, a line of dialogue taken directly from Drake's script. The New York Post said:

"Nancy later told Paramount she had never read Diane's screenplay, but the record showed she had taken a meeting with Drake based upon the script's submission as a writing sample," the Paramount source added. Drake had her attorneys contact Paramount, and around Dec. 1, 1999, Paramount paid Drake $700,000 - officially saying it was buying Ladies Man.

Diane Drake has refused to comment on this publicly, but Paramount Studios granted her a story credit on the 2000 movie. What Women Want went on to become the second largest grossing romantic comedy of all time in North America. The film was remade in China in 2011 as What Women Want, with Andy Lau and Gong Li. It was remade again as What Men Want in 2019, with a female protagonist, played by Taraji P. Henson.

=== Authorship ===
In April, 2016, Diane released her first book, Get Your Story Straight; A Step-by-Step Guild to Screenwriting by a Million-Dollar Screenwriter.

=== Teaching ===
Diane Drake has been an instructor with the UCLA Extension Writer's program since 2009.

=== Script consultancy ===
Diane has done private consulting through her official website dianedrake.com since 2011.
