= What Women Want (2011 film) =

2011 Chinese-Hong Kong film by Chen Daming

- Traditional Chinese: 我知女人心
- Simplified Chinese: 我知女人心
- Hanyu Pinyin: Wǒ Zhī Nǚ Rén Xīn
- Jyutping: Ngo2 Zi1 Neoi5 Jan2 Sam1
- Directed by: Chen Daming
- Screenplay by: Chen Daming
- Based on: What Women Want by: Josh Goldsmith; Cathy Yuspa; Diane Drake
- Produced by: Chen Daming; Don Yu
- Starring: Andy Lau; Gong Li
- Cinematography: Max Wang
- Edited by: Nelson Quan
- Music by: Christoper O'Young
- Production companies: Beijing Bona Film and Cultural Communication Co., Ltd; China Film Group Corporation; DMG Entertainment Group; Emperor Motion Pictures; Bona Entertainment Company Limited; Focus Film Limited
- Distributed by: Beijing Polybona Film Distribution Co. Ltd. (China); Emperor Motion Pictures; Distribution Workshop (Hong Kong)
- Release dates: 3 February 2011 (China); 17 February 2011 (Hong Kong)
- Running time: 115 minutes
- Countries: China; Hong Kong
- Languages: Mandarin; English
- Budget: US$5 million
- Box office: US$11.8 million

What Women Want is a 2011 romantic comedy film remake of the 2000 American film of the same name. A Chinese-Hong Kong co-production, the film stars Andy Lau and Gong Li. What Women Want was released in China on 3 February 2011, the first day of Chinese New Year.

The plot is a very close remake of the American version with some minor changes. The plot takes place mostly in an advertising company in Beijing, in which Lau plays a slick ad agency creative director who gets acquainted with his new talented competition, played by Gong. He is helped when he gets the ability to hear women's thoughts due to a freak accident.

== Cast ==
- Andy Lau as Sun Zigang
- Gong Li as Li Yilong
- Yuan Li as Yanni
- Banny Chen as Xiao Fei
- Hu Jing as Zhao Hung
- Zhu Zhu as Xiao Wu
- Li Chengru as CEO Dong
- Anya Wu as Dong's wife
- Osric Chau as Chen Erdong
- Wang Deshun as Sun Meisheng
- Chen Daming as Young Sun Meisheng
- Mavis Pan as Pan's secretary
- Russell Wong as Peter
- Kelly Hu as Girl in Lotto Commercial
- Ping Wong as Foo Ping Pong

== See also ==
- Andy Lau filmography
