= Nelson Quan =

Chinese-American film editor, director and producer

- Nelson Quan bodyboarding.
- Born: Nelson Quan; October 14, 1984 (age 41); Houston, Texas, U.S.
- Occupations: Film director and editor

Nelson Quan (Chinese: 关景元, born October 14, 1984, Houston, Texas, USA) is a Chinese-American film editor, director and producer. His editing of the Volkswagen People's Car Project won the project the Golden Lion Award at the 2013 Cannes Film Festival for Branded Entertainment. He is known for editing the 2011 Chinese remake, What Women Want (Chinese: 《我知女人心》) and produced The Criminally Inept (2006) along with being one of the first students at the University of Hawaii at Manoa's Academy for Creative Media.

Born and raised in Houston, Texas, Quan was raised by two Chinese parents. He attended the University of Hawaii, Mānoa's Academy for Creative Media and attained a B.A. in Film and TV Producing.

Under the mentor and direction of former Tri-Star President of Production Chris Lee, Nelson joined with three other interns to have an all-expense-paid internship on the set of the 2006 Bryan Singer film Superman Returns.

After the internship, Nelson worked alongside director Ryan Ishii to produce his own feature The Criminally Inept (2006). Later after Nelson graduated from college, he went on to pursue learning Mandarin and moved to Beijing in the spring of 2008 and studied for two years. After studying, through the introduction of Chris Lee again, Nelson met up with director Daming Chen (Director: Manhole, One Foot Off the Ground, What Women Want).

Nelson helped Daming in many projects, including revising scripts and providing technical help with computer equipment. Nelson then worked on National Wildlife Federation and Xing Xing Digital Entertainment's Wild Animal Baby Explorers where he edited animations and lead the post-production team.

In the summer of 2010, Daming asked Nelson to be his editor for the Chinese remake of What Women Want.

== Filmography ==
Feature films

- Feb 2011: Bona Films - 《我知女人心》 (TRT: 114 min) - Editor
- July 2005: Kolokolo Pictures – The Criminally Inept (TRT: 72 min) – Producer / Editor / First AD

TV Shows

- Jun 2010: National Wildlife Federation and Xing Xing Digital Entertainment - Wild Animal Baby Explorers - Editor / Post-Production Supervisor

Short films

- Jun 2011: 48 Hour Film Contest - Red Room (TRT 7 min) - Director—Winner of the 2011 48 Hour Film Contest's Beijing Audience Award.
- Jan 2011: Kolokolo Pictures - Killer of Thieves (TRT: 5 min) - Director
- Dec 2004: Kolokolo Pictures – Melting Ice (TRT: 10 min) – Producer / Writer / Director
- Dec 2004: Kolokolo Pictures – I Got 99 Problems But Beg Bugs Ain't One (TRT: 45 min) – Producer / Writer / Director
- Sept 2004: Kolokolo Pictures – Hopeless in Honolulu (TRT: 23 min) – Producer / Editor / Cinematography
- May 2004: ACM - Hawaiian Star (TRT: 25 min) – Producer / Director / Writer
- Jan 2004: Kaupalama's Possession (TRT: 13 min) – Producer / Director / Editor / Co-Writer
- Dec 2001: Chosen Few (TRT: 3 min) – Director/Choreographer/Editor

Documentary

- Feb 2011: Contra/MINI - R60 Countryman China Release: Behind the Scenes (TRT: 5 min) - Director
- Jun 2008: Kolokolo Pictures - Split Spine (TRT: 12 min) - Producer / Director
- Apr 2004: ACM - Humble Beginnings: Derrick Low (TRT: 11 min) – Producer / Director
- Mar 2004: ACM - Hawaiian Dream Documentary (TRT: 12 min) – Co-Editor

Music videos

- Apr 2008: Kolokolo Pictures - 《北京欢迎你》Parody Music Video - Director
- Jan 2008: Soundfile Productions - "Stay Strong" by: Harrold Perrineau - Assist. Editor
- Jun 2007: Kolokolo Pictures - "Don't Know Why" by: Kamuela Kahoano - Director / Cinematography
- Mar 2004: ACM - Hawaiian Dream: "Car Wash" (TRT: 70 sec) – Producer / Director

Commercials

- May 2013: People's Car Project, The Making of an Original - Editor
- May 2011: Lamiu in Maldives - Cinematographer / Editor
- Apr 2011: Volkswagen: "People's Car Project" TV Commercial in China - Editor
- Aug 2009: Apple, Inc.: "Mac Quicktips" in Beijing, China - Co-Editor
