= What Women Want =

2000 film by Nancy Meyers

- Theatrical release poster
- Directed by: Nancy Meyers
- Screenplay by: Josh Goldsmith; Cathy Yuspa
- Story by: Josh Goldsmith; Cathy Yuspa; Diane Drake
- Produced by: Susan Cartsonis; Bruce Davey; Gina Matthews; Nancy Meyers; Matt Williams
- Starring: Mel Gibson; Helen Hunt; Marisa Tomei; Lauren Holly; Mark Feuerstein; Alan Alda
- Cinematography: Dean Cundey
- Edited by: Thomas J. Nordberg; Stephen A. Rotter; Carol Littleton
- Music by: Alan Silvestri
- Production companies: Icon Productions; Wind Dancer Films
- Distributed by: Paramount Pictures (United States and Canada); Icon Entertainment International (International)
- Release date: December 15, 2000
- Running time: 126 minutes
- Country: United States
- Language: English
- Budget: $70 million
- Box office: $374.1 million

What Women Want is a 2000 American romantic fantasy comedy film written by Josh Goldsmith, Cathy Yuspa, and Diane Drake, directed by Nancy Meyers, and starring Mel Gibson and Helen Hunt.

The film was released on December 15, 2000, by Paramount Pictures in the United States and Canada and by Icon Productions in international markets. It received mixed reviews from critics, but was a box-office success, with a North American domestic gross of $182 million and a worldwide gross of $374.1 million against a budget of $70 million, becoming the fourth-highest-grossing film of 2000.

A loose remake, What Men Want, was released in 2019, starring Taraji P. Henson, Tracy Morgan and Aldis Hodge.

== Plot ==
Nick Marshall, a Chicago advertising executive, is a chauvinist skilled at selling products to men and seducing women. He expects a promotion at the advertising firm Sloane Curtis, but agency boss Dan Wanamaker instead announces that he is hiring top rival Darcy Maguire to broaden the firm's appeal to women. Meanwhile, Nick's estranged 15-year-old daughter, Alex, is staying with him while his remarried ex-wife, Gigi, is on her honeymoon. Nick embarrasses Alex, who resents his over-protectiveness when he meets her older boyfriend, Cameron.

Darcy tasks the staff, including Nick, to develop advertising ideas for a series of feminine products she distributes at the staff meeting. He falls into his home bathtub while holding an electric hairdryer, shocking himself, and is knocked unconscious.

Awakening to discover that he can hear women's thoughts, Nick initially dislikes the ability after learning that most women shun him and consider him sleazy. His former therapist Dr. Perkins advises him to use the skill to his advantage, noting that he can answer the question Sigmund Freud died unable to answer: "What do women want?"

Nick telepathically eavesdrops on Darcy's ideas but gradually becomes interested in her. Alex resents Nick's years of neglect, but they start to bond while he takes her shopping for a prom dress. After Nick telepathically finds out that Alex intends to sleep with Cameron on the night of the prom, he tells her that Cameron is not interested in her for who she is, just for what he can do with her in bed. Alex, thinking that Nick is being over-protective and trying to sabotage her prom, rejects his advice.

Nick and Darcy spend more time together, becoming romantic, but he steals her idea for a new Nike ad campaign aimed at women, though he later regrets his actions, especially as it leads to Dan firing Darcy. Nick eventually persuades him to rehire her, saying the ad was her idea. Over time, Nick repairs his relationships with female acquaintances, especially those at work. He loses his gift during a severe storm while on his way to see the office messenger, Erin, who has been contemplating suicide. She is overjoyed when he offers her a coveted promotion.

When Cameron dumps Alex at the prom for refusing to have sex, Nick consoles her, cementing their newly repaired relationship. He visits Darcy and explains everything. She fires him but then forgives him, and they kiss.

== Cast ==
- Mel Gibson as Nick Marshall: A Chicago advertising executive, he acquires the gift to hear what women are thinking.
  - Logan Lerman as Young Nick Marshall
- Helen Hunt as Darcy Maguire: Nick's co-worker, she later becomes his love interest.
- Marisa Tomei as Lola: Working in a coffee shop, she is trying to become an actress. Nick uses his ability to seduce her.
- Mark Feuerstein as Morgan Farwell is Nick's best friend, who is a protégé to him.
- Lauren Holly as Gigi: Nick's ex-wife, mother of Alex, she has just married Ted; they leave on their honeymoon in the first scenes.
- Ashley Johnson as Alex Marshall: Nick's daughter, she comes to stay with him, while her mom Gigi and stepdad Ted go on their honeymoon. She has a boyfriend named Cameron, who will dump her, after she declines sleeping with him right away. She at first has a rocky relationship with her dad, but in the end reconciles with him.
- Judy Greer as Erin: A copy girl at Nick's workplace, she is always ignored, had been turned down indirectly by Nick for a promotion, and is contemplating suicide.
- Alan Alda as Dan Wanamaker, Nick's boss
- Delta Burke as Eve
- Valerie Perrine as Margo
- Lisa Edelstein as Dina
- Sarah Paulson as Annie: Nick's secretary, her job is limited to running menial errands for Nick, which she sees as degrading, in light of her Ivy League education. She has a boyfriend who lives in Israel.
- Ana Gasteyer as Sue Cranston
- Loretta Devine as Flo Glover
- Diana-Maria Riva as Stella
- Eric Balfour as Cameron: Alexandra's older boyfriend, he is manipulative and abandons the relationship after she tells him that she is not ready to sleep with him after the prom.
- Robert Briscoe Evans as Ted: Gigi's second husband and Alexandra's stepfather, he leaves with Gigi at the beginning of the movie to go on their honeymoon.
- Alex McKenna as Alexandra's friend
- Bette Midler as Dr. J. M. Perkins (uncredited)

== Reception ==
=== Box office ===
What Women Want made $33.6 million during its opening weekend. The film topped the box office upon opening, dethroning How the Grinch Stole Christmas, Dude, Where's My Car? and The Emperor's New Groove. Additionally, it had the highest December opening weekend of all time, surpassing Scream 2. This record would last until 2001 when Ocean's Eleven took it. For its second weekend, What Women Want was overtaken by Helen Hunt's other film Cast Away, but nevertheless generated $15.8 million and beat out newcomers The Family Man and Miss Congeniality. It went on to make $182.8 million domestically and $374.1 million worldwide, making it the fourth-highest-grossing film of 2000.

=== Critical response ===
Rotten Tomatoes gave the film an approval rating of 53% based on 122 reviews. The site's critical consensus reads, "Even though Gibson is a good sport in his role, What Women Want is a rather conventional, fluffy comedy-romance that doesn't make good use of its premise." On Metacritic, the film has a score of 47 out of 100, based on 33 critics, indicating "mixed or average reviews". Audiences polled by CinemaScore gave the film an average grade of "B+" on an A+ to F scale.

In a lukewarm review, Kimberley Jones of The Austin Chronicle praised Gibson's performance and likened parts of the film to classic screwball comedies, but felt the ending became a "dull, drawn-out morality play". Amy Taubin of The Village Voice stated that "Gibson has never lacked chemistry with his leading ladies, from Sigourney Weaver in The Year of Living Dangerously to Julia Roberts in Conspiracy Theory, but faced with the awkward Hunt -- Hollywood's bland antidote to the Lolita syndrome -- he doesn't even try." Roger Ebert wrote the movie "doesn't flow so much as leap from one good scene to another over the crevices of flat scenes in between ... it's not boring and is often very funny". Stephanie Zacharek of Salon was critical: "Although What Women Want is being marketed toward women, it does nothing but condescend to them."

=== Awards ===
For his portrayal of Nick Marshall, Gibson was nominated for the Golden Globe Award for Best Actor – Motion Picture Musical or Comedy and a Blockbuster Entertainment Award for Favorite Actor—Comedy/Romance. Hunt won the latter award in the Favorite Actress—Comedy/Romance category, while Mark Feuerstein and Marisa Tomei each received a nomination in the supporting categories. It also garnered Tomei a nod for the Satellite Award for Best Supporting Actress – Motion Picture, while Ashley Johnson was nominated at the Young Artist Awards.

For his score, composer Alan Silvestri won the ASCAP Award for Top Box Office Films, it received a Saturn Award nomination for Best Fantasy Film from the Academy of Science Fiction, Fantasy & Horror Films, US. The film also won the Bogey Award in Platin from the Bogey Awards, Germany. It was also nominated for the Best Casting for Feature Film, Comedy from the Casting Society of America, US. It received the Golden Screen Award in Germany.

== Legacy ==
=== Remake ===
In 2009, website Pajiba published an article reporting that producer and scriptwriter Peter Chiarelli was working on a sequel, which would reimagine the concept from the viewpoint of a woman who could hear men's thoughts. Cameron Diaz was courted to star as its lead. The film was released in 2019 as What Men Want with Taraji P. Henson in the lead role.

=== Foreign market remakes ===
Aga Bai Arrecha! in 2004 is a Marathi film directed by Kedar Shinde from India that is loosely based on What Women Want.

A Chinese remake directed by Chen Daming starring Andy Lau and Gong Li was released in 2011.
