= List of Los Angeles bike paths =

Bike routes in California's most populated county

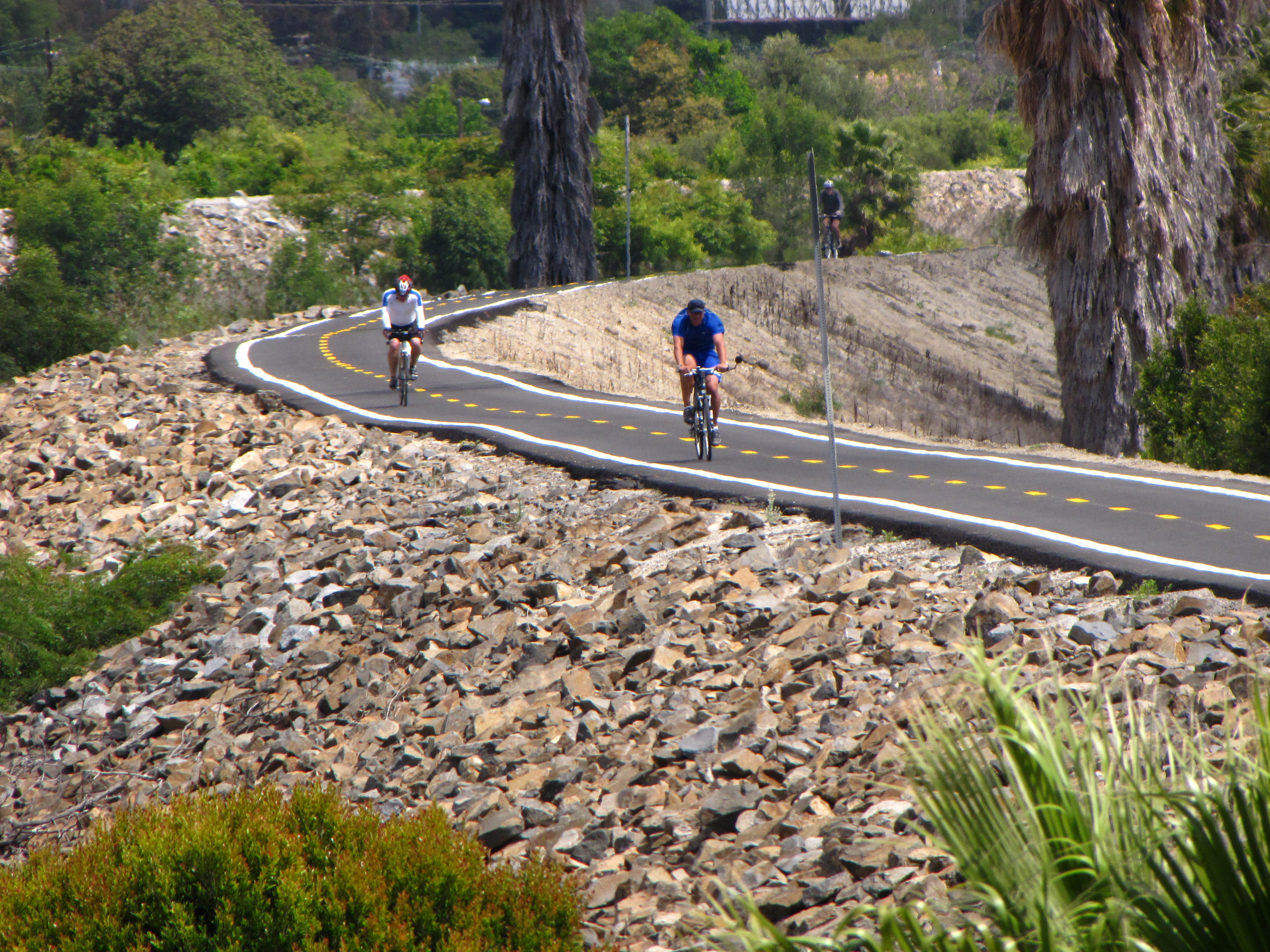
San Gabriel River Bike Trail in Long Beach

This is a list of bike paths in Los Angeles County, California, United States.

== Paths ==
- 98th Street bicycle path – runs from Avalon Boulevard to Clovis Avenue along 98th Street in the South Los Angeles area. Bike Path ID: 1. Mileage: 0.52.
- Arroyo Seco bicycle path – runs in the Arroyo Seco river channel, from Montecito Heights, Los Angeles, to South Pasadena. Bike Path ID: 5. Mileage: 2.27. (connects to Kenneth Newell Bikeway in Pasadena.)
- Balboa Boulevard East bicycle path – runs along Balboa Boulevard, from Victory Boulevard to Burbank Boulevard, in Encino, Los Angeles. Bike Path ID: 1818. Mileage: 1.

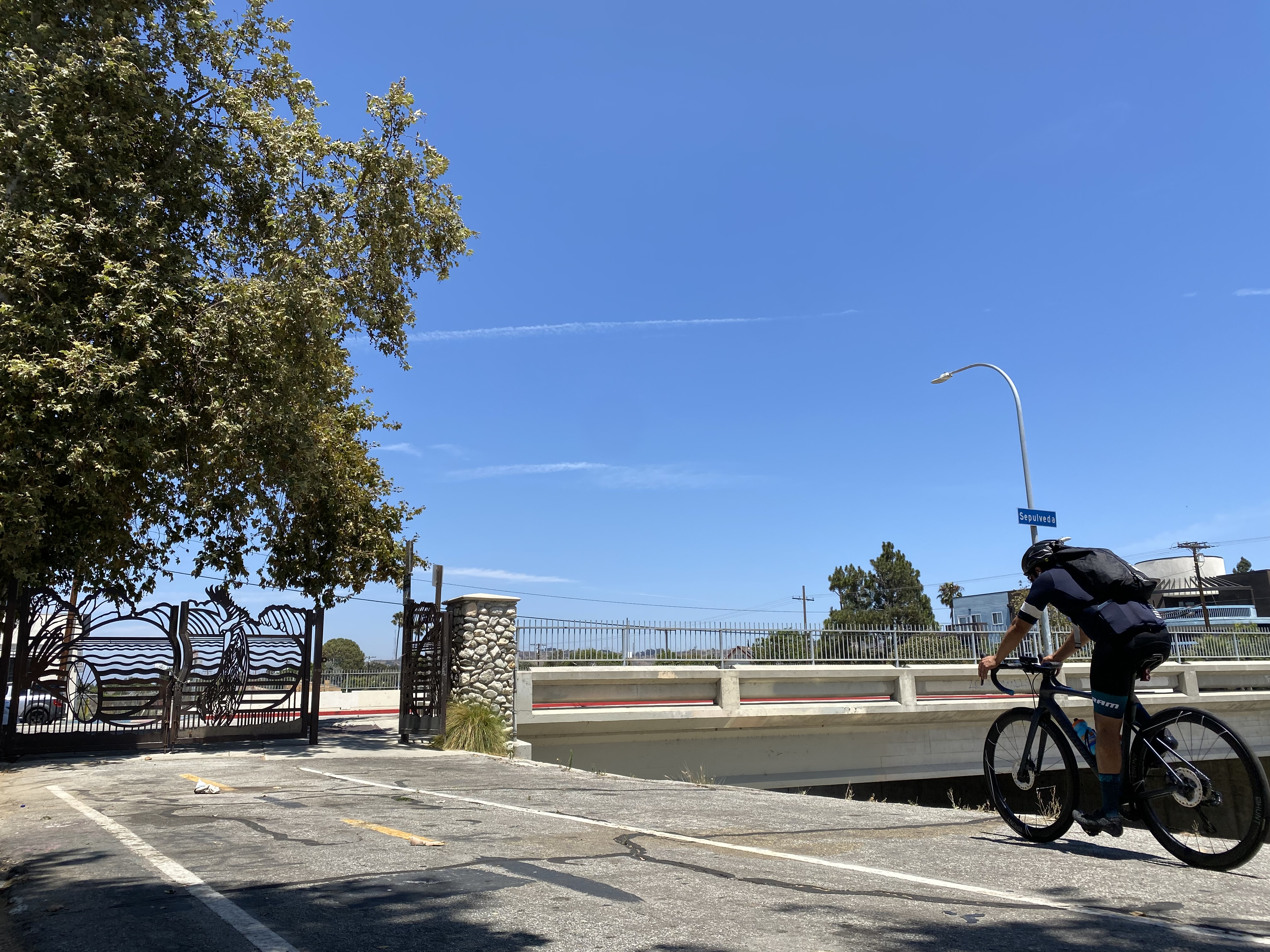
Cyclist on Ballona Creek Bike Path near Sepulveda Blvd.

- Ballona Creek bicycle path – runs along Ballona Creek in the Westside Los Angeles area. The LA city-owned segment of this bicycle path is in two sections. The easternmost section of the bike path runs from the LA/Culver City border to 62nd Street in the northwestern Baldwin Hills area, (Bike Path ID: 1832, Mileage: 0.23) and is 0.23 miles long. The western section maintained by LADOT runs from Lincoln Boulevard in Playa Vista to Sepulveda Boulevard at the border of Culver City (Bike Path ID: 9, Mileage: 2.49). This bicycle path continues east several miles into Culver City, and ends at the Metro Expo Line La Cienega/Jefferson station. The westernmost extension of this bicycle path is via roads in Marina Del Rey and Playa del Rey, connecting to the Dockweiler State Beach bicycle path, which is part of the 22-mile coastal Marvin Braude Bike Trail.
- Browns Creek Bike Trail – runs along Browns Canyon Wash from 314' south of Rinaldi Street to Devonshire Street in Chatsworth, Los Angeles. Bike Path ID: 1830. Mileage: 0.91.
- Burbank Boulevard bicycle path – runs in the Sepulveda Basin park, from Balboa Boulevard to 727' west of I-405, near the Encino Golf Course. Bike Path ID: 12. Mileage: 2.37.
- Burbank Channel Bikeway – located in Burbank with two segments: Cohasset Street to Tulare Avenue (0.3 mi), and Buena Vista St. to Jackson Street (0.6 mi).
- Cabrillo Beach bicycle path – runs in San Pedro, from Oliver Vickery Circle Way to the end of the jetty at Cabrillo Beach Park. Bike Path ID: 13. Mileage: 0.38.
- Canterbury Avenue bicycle path – runs from Chase Street to Reedly Street along Canterbury Avenue in the San Fernando Valley. Bike Path ID: 14. Mileage: 0.52.
- Chandler Boulevard bicycle path – on Chandler Boulevard in the San Fernando Valley. The LADOT-maintained portion runs from Vineland Avenue to Clybourn Avenue in North Hollywood (Bike path ID: 18. Mileage: 0.8). The bike path, which changes names to Chandler Bikeway, continues 1.91 miles in Burbank from Clybourn Avenue to Mariposa Street.

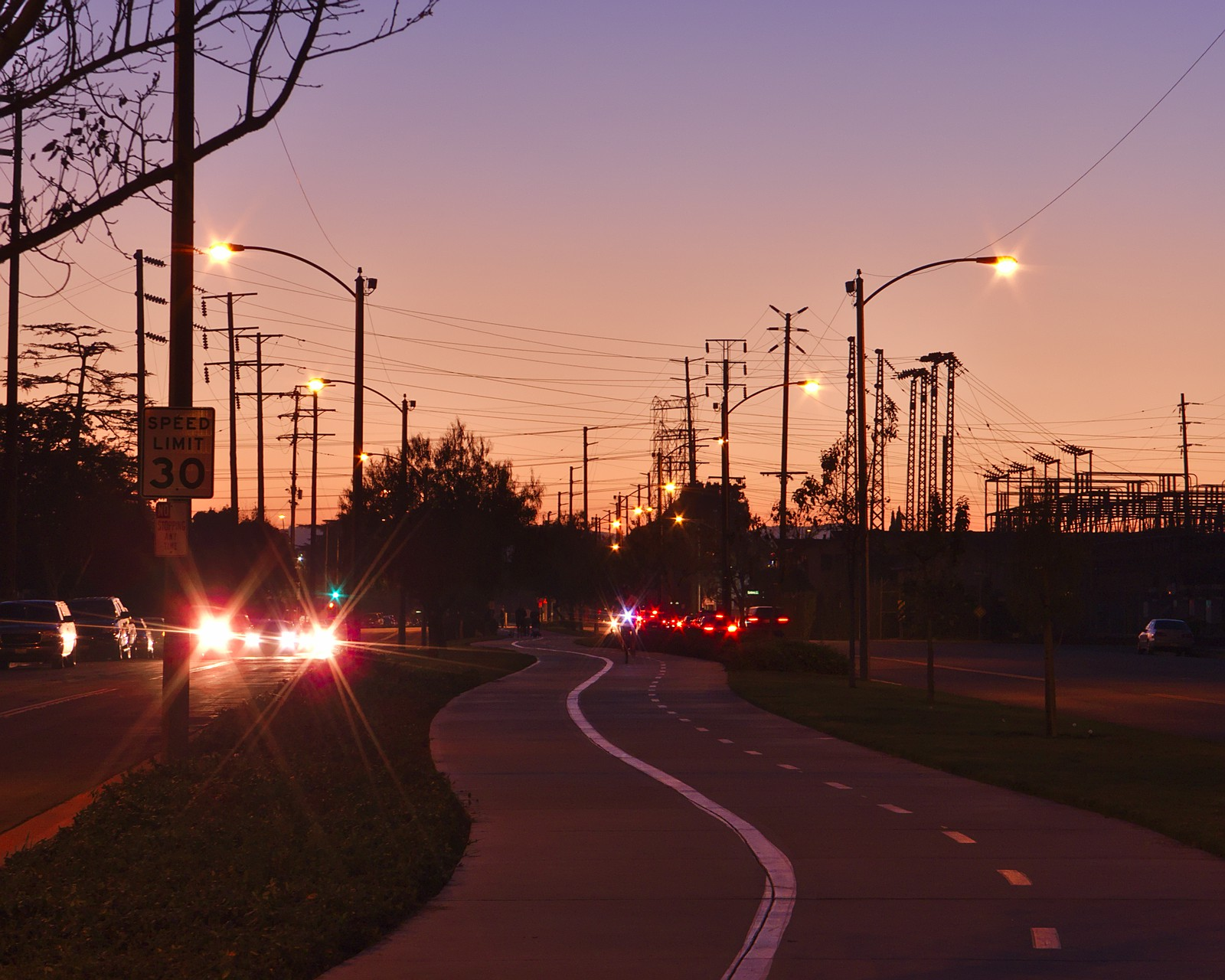
Chandler bike path, evening, Burbank

- Compton Creek bicycle path – runs along Compton Creek in Compton and Rancho Dominguez for almost six miles. It extends from El Segundo Boulevard east of N. Parmelee Avenue(near Centennial High School) to Del Amo Boulevard near the Blue Line Del Amo station.
- Coyote Creek bicycle path – runs along Coyote Creek, on the Orange County border to Long Beach. Maintained by CalTrans.
- Culver Boulevard Median Bike Path – runs from McConnell Avenue to Sawtelle Boulevard in Culver City. Bike Path ID: 20. Mileage: 1.4.
- Devonshire Street bicycle path – Runs from Woodman Avenue to Arleta Avenue. Bike Path ID: 21. Mileage: 0.5.
- Dominguez Channel bicycle path/Laguna Dominguez bicycle trail – runs along the Dominguez Channel, and is partially maintained by the city of Los Angeles and partially maintained by the county of Los Angeles. The city-maintained portion runs from .03 miles west of Vermont Avenue to West 190th Street along Dominguez Channel in Gardena. Bike Path ID: 23. Mileage: 0.79. The county-maintained portion continues for 2.7 miles along the Dominguez Channel.
- Duarte bicycle path – located in Duarte, this 1.6-mile-long (2.6 km) trail was created by the Rails-to-Trails Conservancy.
- El Dorado Park Bike Path – located in El Dorado Park in Long Beach. The 4-mile-long (6.4 km) path connects with the San Gabriel River Bike Trail.
- Expo Bike Path – runs parallel to the E Line for ~12 miles, from University Park and USC to Santa Monica.
- Hansen Dam bicycle path – runs along Hansen Dam in the northeastern San Fernando Valley. Bike Path ID: 28. Mileage: 2.27.
- Harbor Park bicycle path – runs from Gaffey Street to Harbor Park in San Pedro. Bike Path ID: 29. Mileage: 0.38.
- Heartwell Park Bike Path – runs through Heartwell Park in Long Beach, and is 2.5 miles long. It connects with the San Gabriel River Bike Trail.
- Imperial Highway bicycle path – runs along the westbound side of the Imperial Highway, from 200' east of Hillcrest Avenue to 200 feet east of Pershing Drive, adjacent to Los Angeles International Airport. Bike Path ID: 33. Mileage: 0.25.
- La Cañada Verde Creek Bicycle Path – a short bike path in Whittier, running 0.1 miles along the south side of La Cañada Verde Creek from Mulberry Street to Broadway.

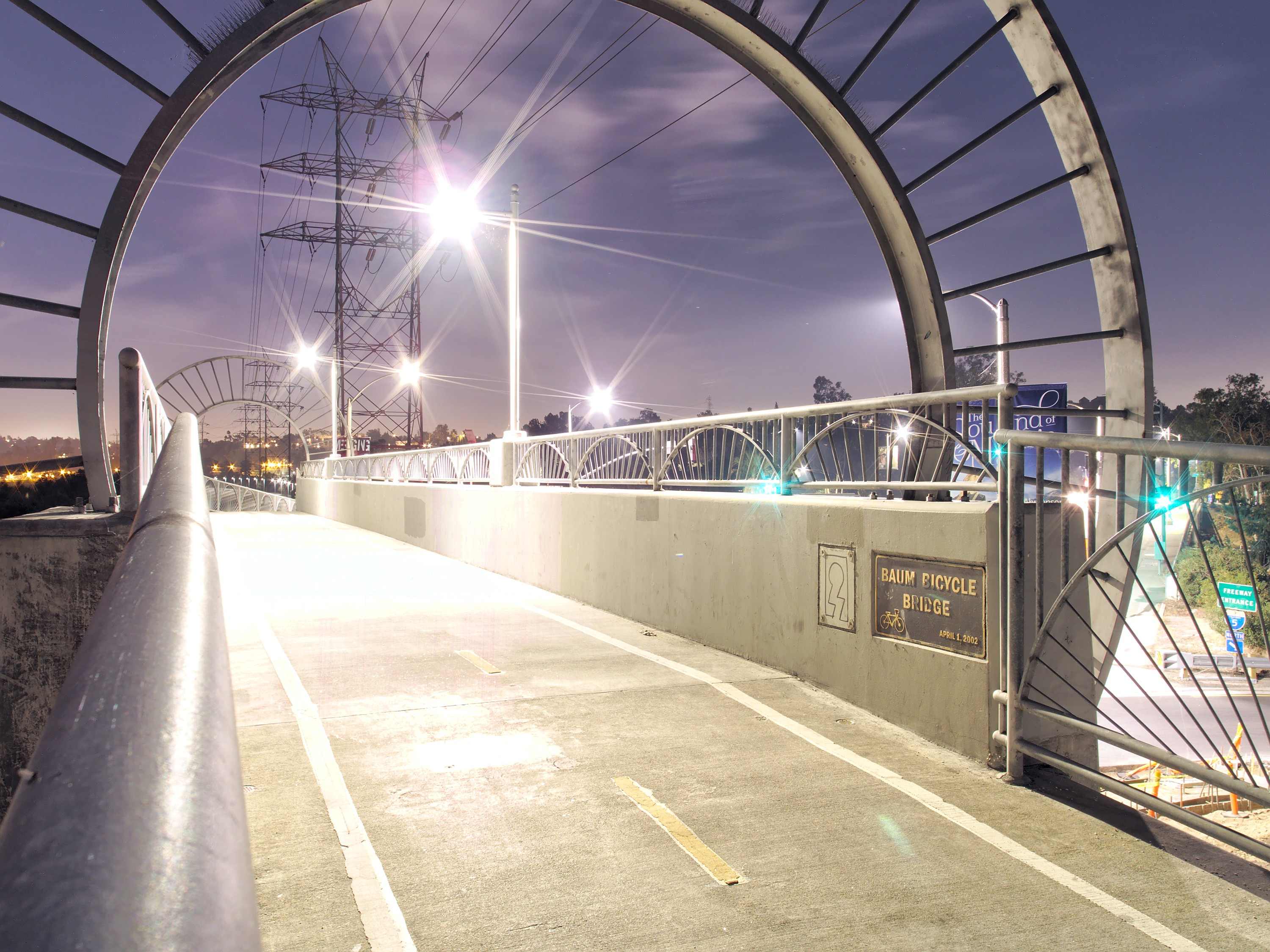
Baum Bicycle Bridge at Los Feliz Boulevard, part of the Los Angeles River Greenway.

- Los Angeles River Bicycle Path – runs along parts of the Los Angeles River, in separate sections currently. One runs . Another runs in the Glendale Narrows from Riverside Drive at Zoo Drive in Griffith Park to Elysian Valley in Los Angeles. (Bike Path ID: 1905, Mileage: 4.5). The path has recently been extended south to Elysian Valley, just north of downtown Los Angeles, for a full length of 7.4 miles. NBC Universal has agreed to pay $13.5 million in order to have an additional 6.4 miles of the L.A. River bicycle path built, from its current northern Glendale Narrows terminus in Burbank to Whitsett Avenue in Studio City.
- Los Angeles River Bikeway – also known as the Los Angeles River bicycle path or by its acronym LARIO. It runs along the lower the Los Angeles River from Vernon downstream to the Downtown Marina Long Beach and its mouth. It is 29.1 miles long and runs along the east side of the Los Angeles River.
- Lake Los Angeles bike path – located at Lake Los Angeles in the Mojave Desert, it runs along 170th St. East. for 2.7 miles between Avenue M-8 and Avenue P. A spur runs 0.5 miles along Avenue O from 170th St. East to 165th St. East.
- Legg Lake bicycle path – located in the Whittier Narrows Recreation Area in South El Monte, California.
- Mark Bixby Memorial Bicycle-Pedestrian Path on Long Beach International Gateway Bridge 1.5 mi (2.4 km)
- Marvin Braude Bike Trail – a 22-mile-long (35 km) bike trail along the Pacific Ocean shoreline of western Los Angeles County, from Pacific Palisades south to Torrance. Sections of the bike trail are managed by a wide variety of municipal authorities and have several different names.
  Sections, listed north to south and managed by a variety of municipal authorities, include:
  - Will Rogers State Beach bicycle path – northernmost section, within Will Rogers State Beach in Pacific Palisades from Temescal Canyon Road southeast to Santa Monica city limits. Bike Path ID: 65. Mileage: 1.37.
  - Santa Monica bicycle path – along the beach in Santa Monica, and connecting Will Rogers State Beach bicycle path to the Venice Beach bicycle path.
  - Venice Beach bicycle path – along Venice Beach, from the Santa Monica bicycle path to Washington Boulevard. Bike Path ID: 61. Mileage: 1.51.
  - Dockweiler State Beach bicycle path – runs from Ballona Creek at Marina del Rey through Playa del Rey and Dockweiler State Beach to the El Segundo city limit. Bike Path ID: 22. Mileage: 3.79. This bicycle path connects via roads to the Ballona Creek bicycle path.
  - The Strand bicycle path – the South Bay section, from El Segundo, south through Manhattan Beach, Hermosa Beach, and Redondo Beach, to Torrance.

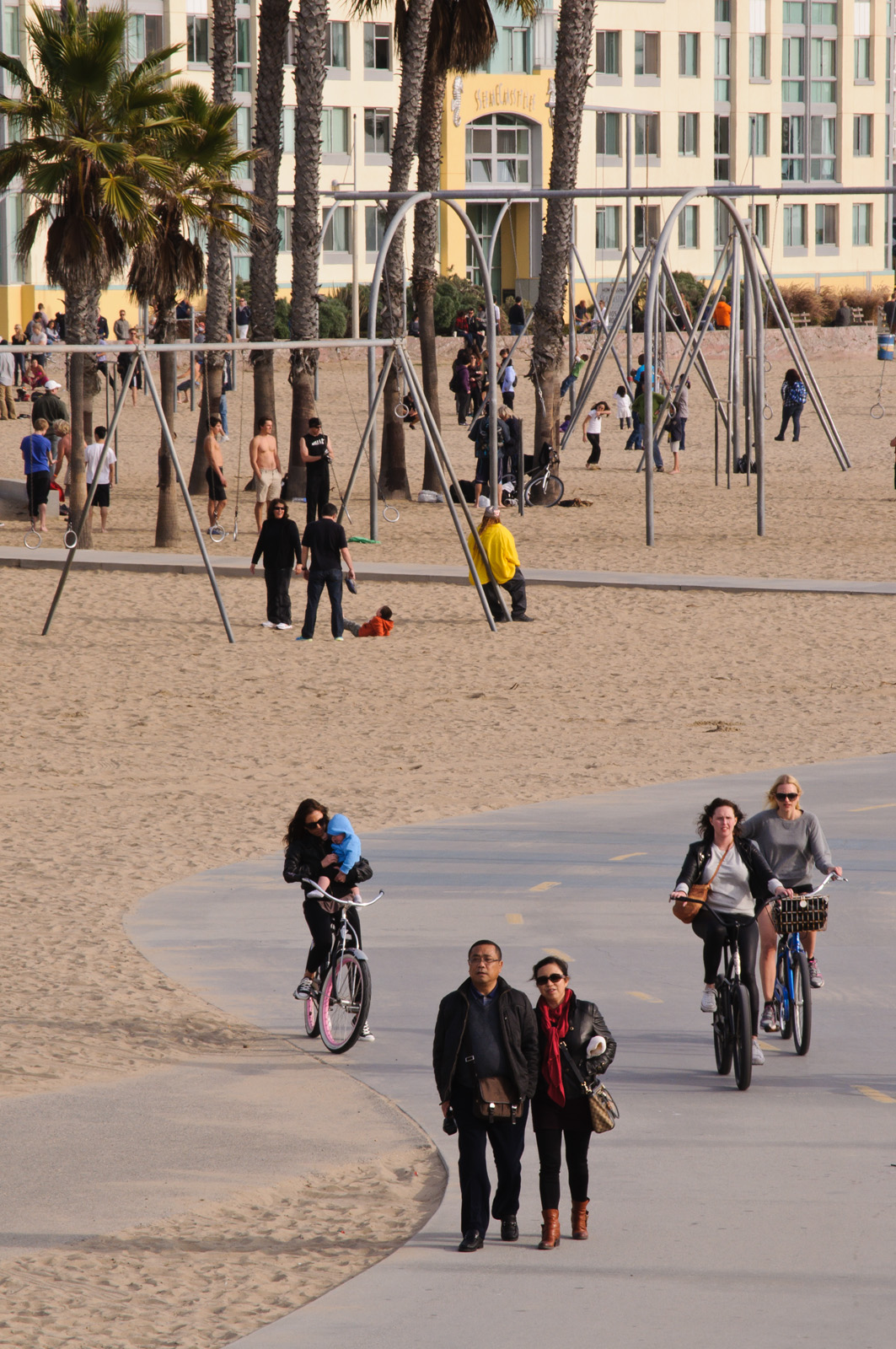
Bike and pedestrian paths on Santa Monica beach

- G Line Bikeway – runs in 2 sections, parallel to the original Los Angeles Metro G Line in the San Fernando Valley. The west path section runs from White Oak Avenue to Canoga station in Canoga Park. Bike Path ID: 41. Mileage: 4.66. The east path section runs from Haskell Avenue to Leghorn Avenue. Bike Path ID: 40. Mileage: 3.84.
  - Orange Line Extension bicycle path – runs parallel to the Los Angeles Metro G Line extension and Canoga Avenue in the West San Fernando Valley, from the Canoga Metro station to Lassen Street in Chatsworth. Bike Path ID: 1969. Mileage: 4.
- Oxnard Street bicycle path – runs from White Oak Avenue to Balboa Boulevard along Oxnard Street in Encino. Bike Path ID: 44. Mileage: 1.08.
- Pacific Electric Inland Empire Trail – running from Claremont in eastern Los Angeles County, for 18 miles, to Montclair, Upland, Rancho Cucamonga and Fontana in San Bernardino County. The final eastern segment, extending through Rialto, will bring the length of the trail to 21 miles.
- Palos Verdes Drive bicycle path – runs on Palos Verdes Drive, from South Western Avenue to Gaffey Street in San Pedro. Bike Path ID: 50. Mileage: 0.8.
- Plummer Street bicycle path – runs on Plummer Street in Chatsworth, from Shoup Avenue to Hunt Club Lane. Bike Path ID: 52. Mileage: 0.41.
- Puddingstone Reservoir bicycle path – in Frank G. Bonelli Regional Park, located in San Dimas, and ~8 miles long.
- Rail to Rail, 5.5 miles in South Los Angeles from Fairview Heights station to Slauson station
- Rio Hondo bicycle path – runs along the Rio Hondo, from near North Peck Road in El Monte, through the Whittier Narrows Recreation Area, to the eastern bank's section of the Los Angeles River bicycle path. It also connects with the San Gabriel River bicycle path.
- Sale Avenue bicycle path – runs on Sale Avenue in Woodland Hills, from Oxnard Street to Calvert Street, in the western San Fernando Valley. Bike Path ID: 53. Mileage: 0.14.
- San Gabriel River bicycle path – runs alongside the San Gabriel River for 28 miles, between Azusa in the Pomona Valley and Long Beach, where it runs through El Dorado Park to end at the Alamitos Bay Marina near the Shoreline Pedestrian Bikepath.
- San Francisquito Trail – a 4.36-mile trail in Santa Clarita between Newhall Ranch Road and Brook Road at the Decoro Drive Bridge. This trail connects to the Santa Clara River Trail.
- San Fernando Road bicycle path – runs along the Metrolink Antelope Valley Line route and San Fernando Road. Phase 1 runs from Roxford Street to Hubbard Street in the northeastern San Fernando Valley. Bike Path ID: 55. Mileage: 1.91. There is a bike path connecting Hubbard Street to Wolfskill Street. Phase 2 opened in 2014 from Wolfskill Street to Branford Street. Mileage: 2.75. When completed, the bicycle path will run to Cohasset Drive in Burbank to connect with the Burbank Airport–South station.
- San Jose Creek bike path – along San Jose Creek in the City of Industry, for 2.1 miles from 7th Avenue to Workman Mill Road. Whittier plans to extend this path by 15.6 miles.
- Santa Anita Wash Bicycle Path – along the Santa Anita Wash for 1 mile, from Live Oak Avenue to the east side of the spillway of Peck Road Water Conservation. It connects to the Rio Hondo bicycle path.
- Santa Clara River Trail – also known as the Chuck Pontius Commuter Rail Trail. Located along the upper Santa Clara River in Santa Clarita, running 7.29 miles from Soledad Canyon Road & Deep Creek Drive to Valencia Boulevard Bridge south of Auto Center Court. This trail connects to the San Francisquito Trail.

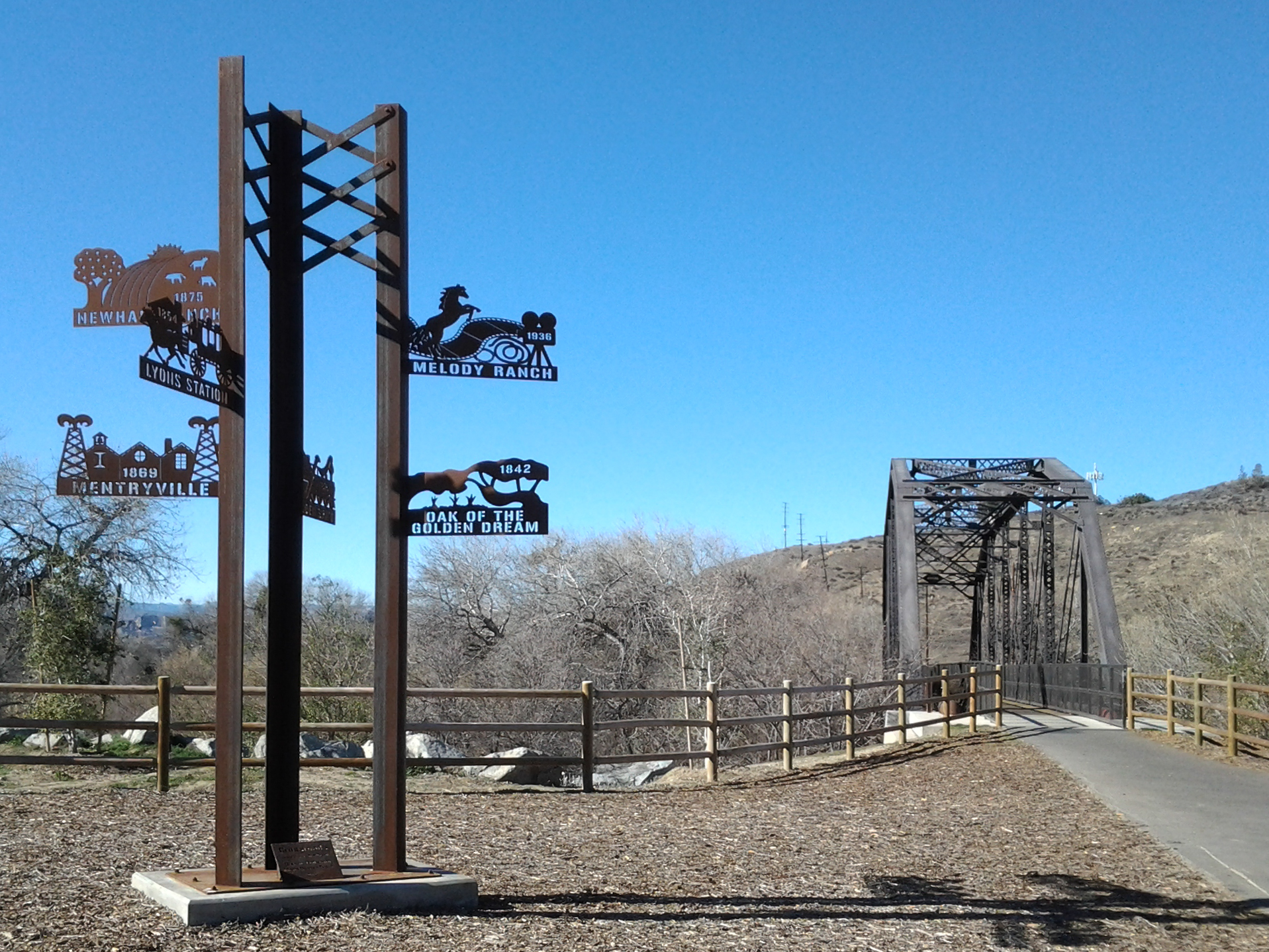
Santa Clara River trail

- Shoreline Pedestrian Bikepath – located in Long Beach. The 3.1-mile-long (5.0 km) bike path is between Alamitos Avenue on the west to 54th Place on the east.
- Sierra Highway Bike Path – runs 7.1 miles in the Antelope Valley, from East Avenue J in Lancaster south to Easy Avenue Q7 in Palmdale.
- South Fork Trail – in Santa Clarita, California, connects to both the Santa Clara River Trail and the San Francisquito Trail. It is 8.32 miles long and runs from the intersection of Lyons Avenue and Ave Entranta to west of McBean Parkway and Magic Mountain Parkway.
- Thompson Creek trail – runs along Thompson Creek in Claremont for 2.8 miles. Access points include Base Line Road, Higginbotham Park, North Indian Hill Boulevard, and Pomello Drive. The park has a parking lot located on North Indian Hill Boulevard across from La Puerta Sports Park.
- Tujunga Wash bicycle path – runs in North Hollywood from Oxnard Street to Burbank Boulevard in the eastern San Fernando Valley. Bike Path ID: 56. Mileage: 0.52.
- Victory Boulevard bicycle path – beside Victory Boulevard in Encino from White Oak Avenue to the San Diego Freeway (405 Freeway). Bike Path ID: 62. Mileage: 2.64.
- Watts Towers Crescent Greenway – a paved 0.2-mile-long (0.32 km) trail in Watts near the Watts Towers. It is on Willowbrook just north of 108th Avenue.
- Whittier Greenway Trail – parallel to Whittier Boulevard in Whittier, between Mills Avenue and Pioneer Boulevard near I-605. It is currently 4.7 miles long, but plans exist to extend it east to the border of Orange County.

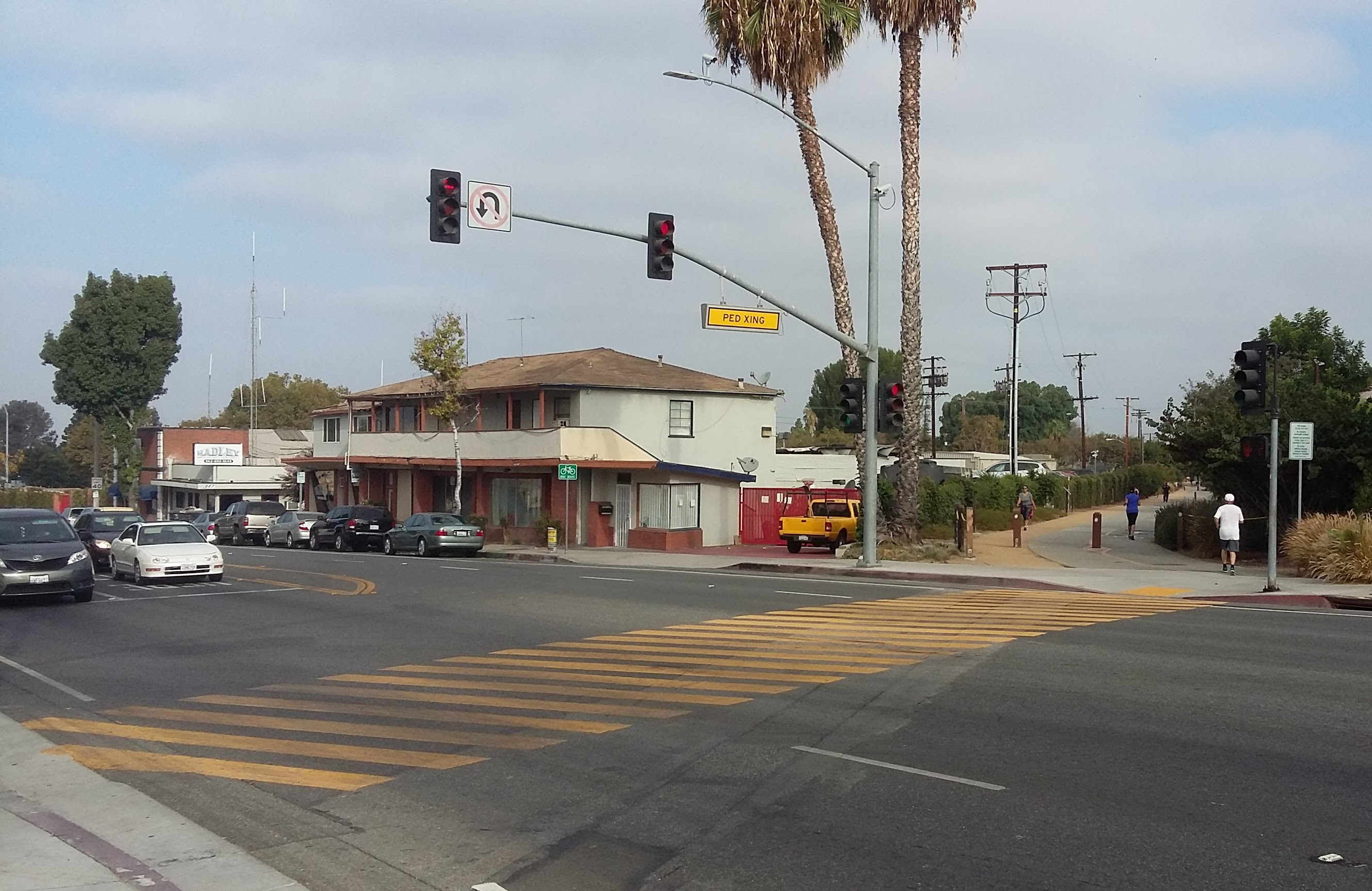
Whittier Greenway Trail, pedestrian crossing at Hadley Street

- Woodley Avenue bicycle path – on Woodley Avenue in Sepulveda Basin park, from Burbank Boulevard to Victory Boulevard. Bike Path ID: 66. Mileage: 1.28.

== Bike trails by watershed ==
Initial “river trails” organization framework created by Loren MacArthur in 1985.

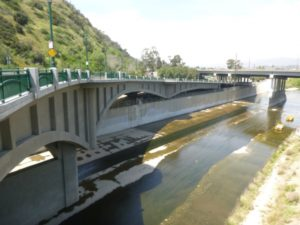
LA river bike path entrance in Cypress Park

NOTE: Legg Lake Loop at Whittier Narrows Recreation Area is a bridge point linking the Los Angeles River and the San Gabriel River watersheds.

I. LOS ANGELES RIVER

“The river goes east-west through the Valley, then turns north-south in downtown L.A., flowing into the Pacific in Long Beach. There are bikeways along only about half of the length of the river currently [2022].”

A. Upper Rio Hondo Bike Trail

1. Santa Anita Wash Trail to Peck Road Water Conservation Park
2. Peck Road Water Conservation Park to Whittier Narrows Recreation Area
3. Whittier Narrows Recreation Area to Grant Rea Park (Montebello)

B. Lario Trail

1. Whittier Narrows Dam to Hollydale Park (South Gate)
2. Hollydale Park to Long Beach Harbor

C. Los Angeles River Bike Trail

D. Remoter tributaries of the Los Angeles River

1. Los Angeles Basin

a. Arroyo Seco (Pasadena area, northeast of downtown Los Angeles)

i. Arroyo Seco Bike Path

ii. Kenneth Newell Bike Path

b. Compton Creek Bike Path

2. San Fernando Valley

a. Browns Creek Bike Path

b. Tujunga Wash Bike Path

II. SAN GABRIEL RIVER

A. West Fork Bike Path

B. San Gabriel River Trail

1. San Gabriel Mountains to Santa Fe Dam
2. Santa Fe Dam to Legg Lake
3. Whittier Narrows Dam to Wilderness Park
4. Wilderness Park to El Dorado Park
5. El Dorado Park to the Pacific Ocean

C. San Jose Creek bike path

D. Coyote Creek Bike Path

E. Billie Boswell Bike Path at El Dorado Park (confluence of San Gabriel River and Coyote Creek)

III. Other LA or SG river-adjacent bike loops or paths

A. Sepulveda Basin Bikeway (loop intersected by Los Angeles River)

B. Long Beach Bike Path (begins at Los Angeles River outlet/estuary in Long Beach)

C. Griffith Park (near Los Angeles River)

1. Mineral Wells Loop
2. Crystal Springs Loop

IV. Separate watersheds (Bike trails in Los Angeles County adjacent to watercourses that are not connected to the San Gabriel or Los Angeles Rivers; listed roughly north to south.)

A. Santa Clara River Trail

1. San Francisquito Trail

2. South Fork Trail

B. Ballona Creek Bike Path

C. Dominguez Channel Bike Path

D. Wilmington Drain and Ken Malloy Harbor Regional Park loop

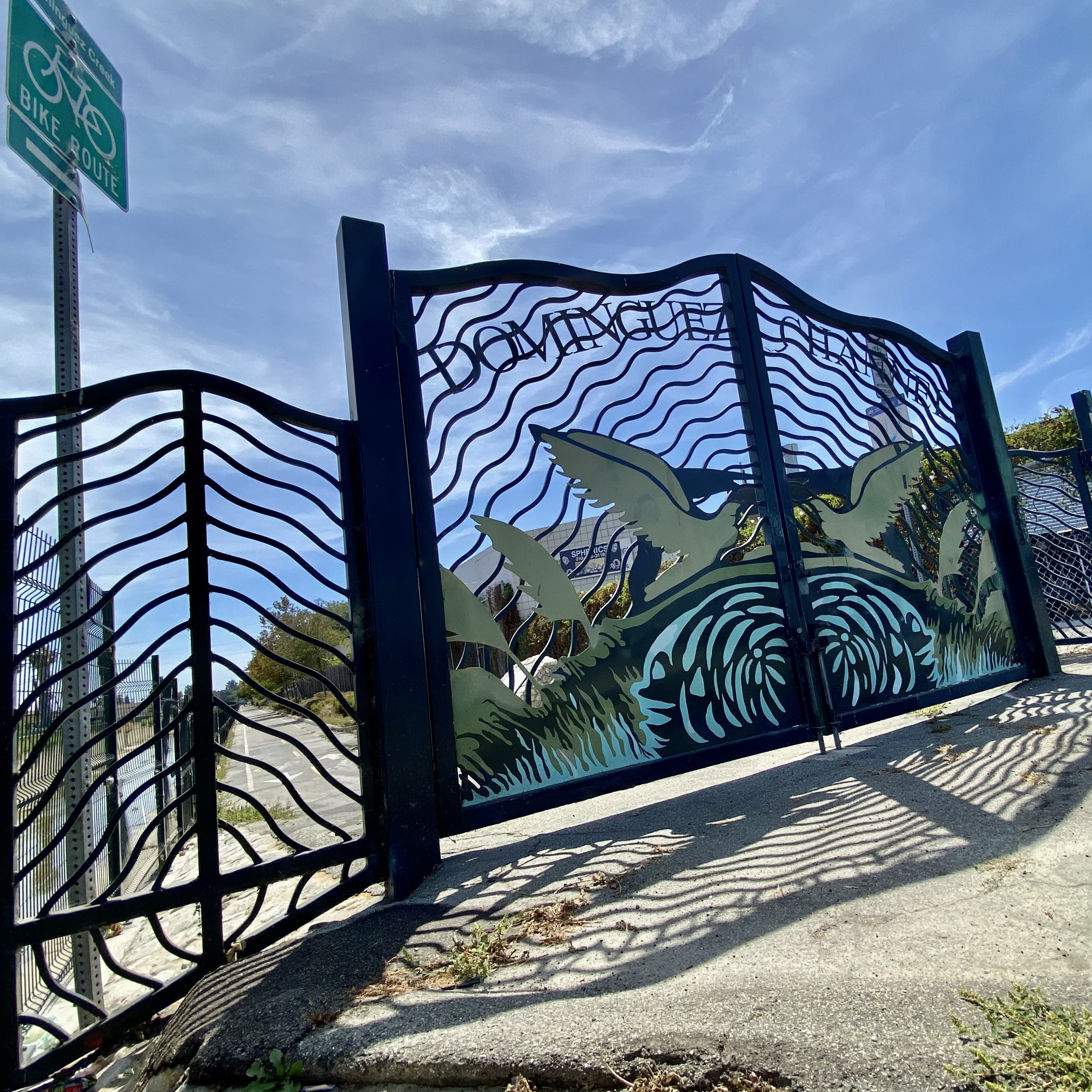
Rosecrans & Crenshaw

== Resources ==
Up-to-date bicycle tourbooks for Los Angeles County have been written by the following authors:

- Patrick Brady
- Don and Sharron Brundige
- Wayne D. Cottrell

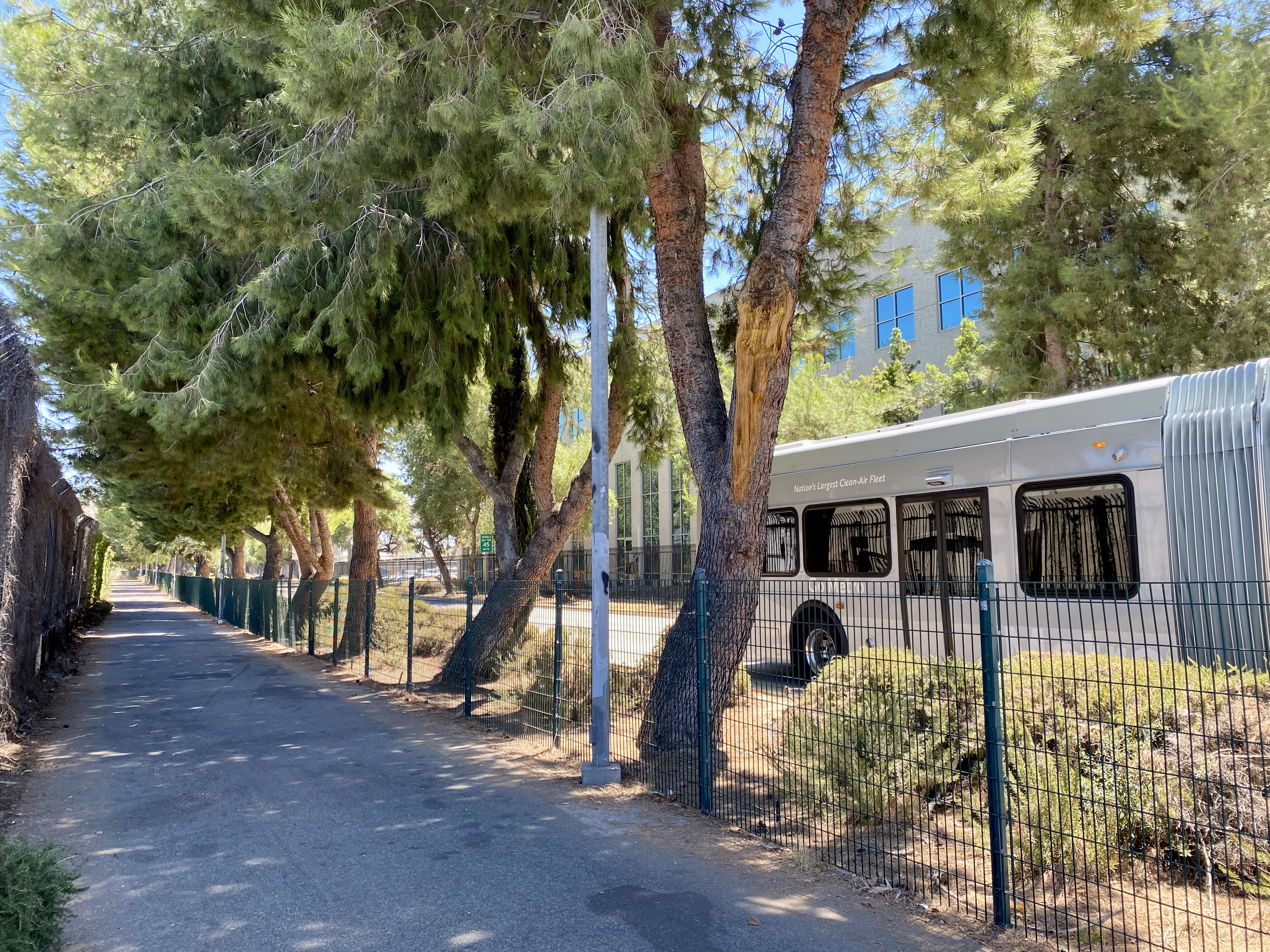
G Line Bikeway through the San Fernando Valley

== Legalities ==
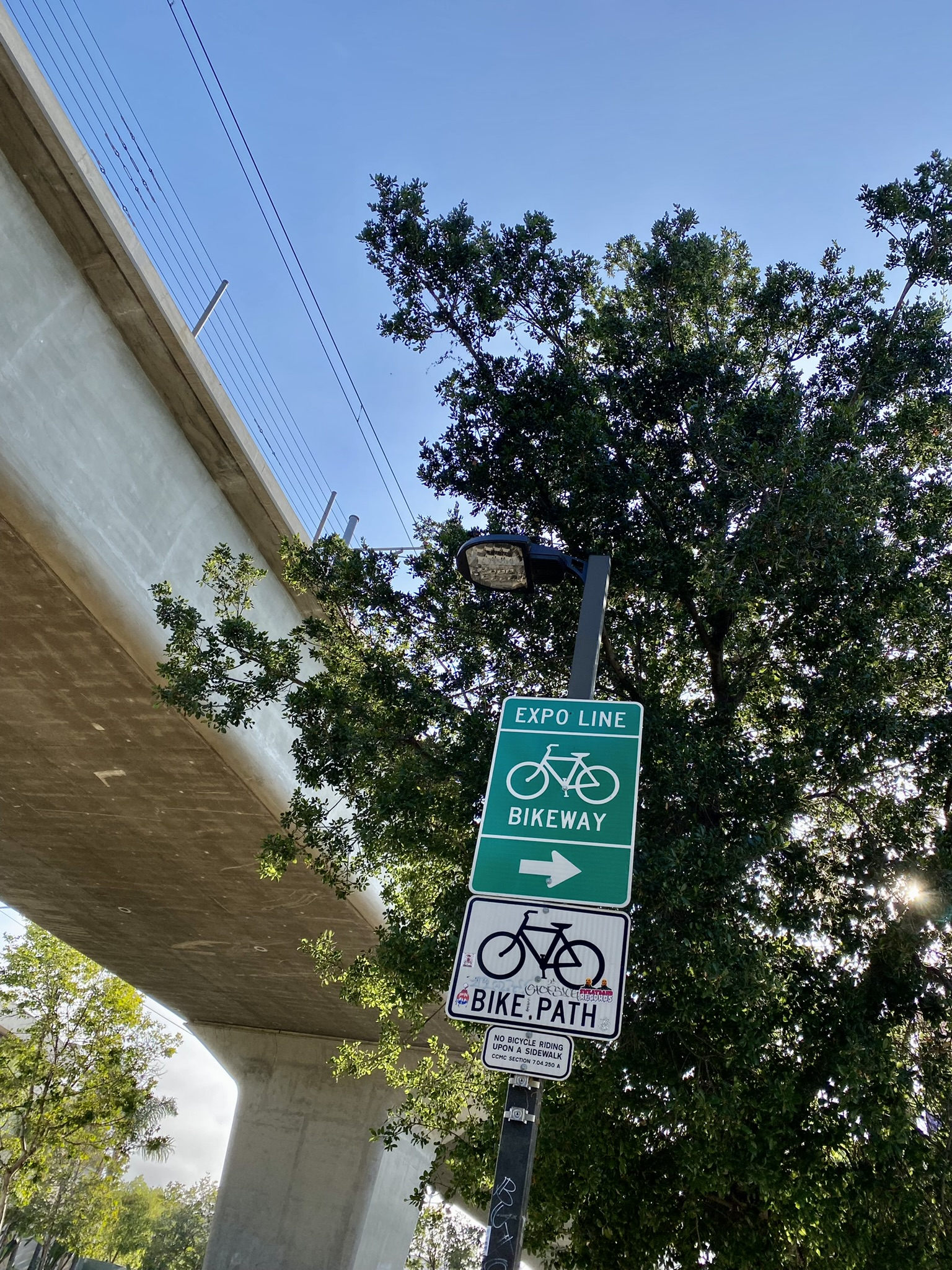
Bike path sharing E Line right-of-way

Bike paths in Los Angeles County are maintained by various government organizations.

California Bike Paths are explicitly defined in Chapter 1000 of the Highway Design Manual (HDM) published by the California Department of Transportation (Caltrans).

Bike paths are uncovered by any warranties as to fitness for safe cycling. This is in direct contrast to ordinary city streets. There are two pieces of case law which establish this clearly, one of them being Prokop v. City of Los Angeles.

It is legal in the City of Los Angeles to ride on sidewalks as long as riders do not show "wanton disregard" for the safety of other sidewalk users. This does not apply to all areas of Los Angeles County. In California, when mounted and riding on the road, cyclists are required to "behave like vehicles" when it comes to obeying signals, signage, and lane restrictions.

== See also ==
- Bike paths in Los Angeles
- CicLAvia
- West Los Angeles Veloway
- List of San Diego bike paths
- California Cycleway
- Bicycle infrastructure
- California bikeway classifications
