= Browns Creek Bike Path =

Cycling route in California, USA

- Length: 1.6 mi (2.6 km)
- Location: Chatsworth, Los Angeles
- Trailheads: North: 34.2714°N 118.5906°W; South: 34.2501°N 118.5984°W
- Use: Active transportation, road biking, walking, dogs on leash
- Difficulty: Easy
- Surface: asphalt

Browns Creek Bike Path is a Class I bike path in the San Fernando Valley, beginning at Lassen Street, just east of Chatsworth Metrolink Station, and ending north of Rinaldi Street near Stoney Point Park.

Browns Creek is a tributary of the Los Angeles River, offering “splendid views of the irregularly shaped Santa Susana mountains rising to the west.” One local writer observed, “What [the concrete-lined creek] lacks in scenery, it compensates for by providing the trail with an open, airy setting.”

The wash passes through a neighborhood with equestrian zoning and “Opposite the bike route, in the west levee, a horse trail also follows the creek.” Domestic goats, roosters and ponies have also been seen along the path.

At Chatsworth station, bicyclists can connect to the G Line Bikeway.

The path is in close proximity to Chatsworth Park North and Chatsworth Park South (both operated by the City of Los Angeles Parks Department) and Chatsworth Nature Preserve. Both parks are accessible from Valley Circle Road. Riders can create an approximately 6.3-mile (10.1 km) loop beginning at either end of the Browns Creek route, connecting to Valley Circle Road via either Chatsworth Street or Lassen Street.

== See also ==
- List of Los Angeles bike paths
- G Line (Los Angeles Metro)
