= Chandler Boulevard Bike Path =

Cycling route in San Fernando Valley, California, USA

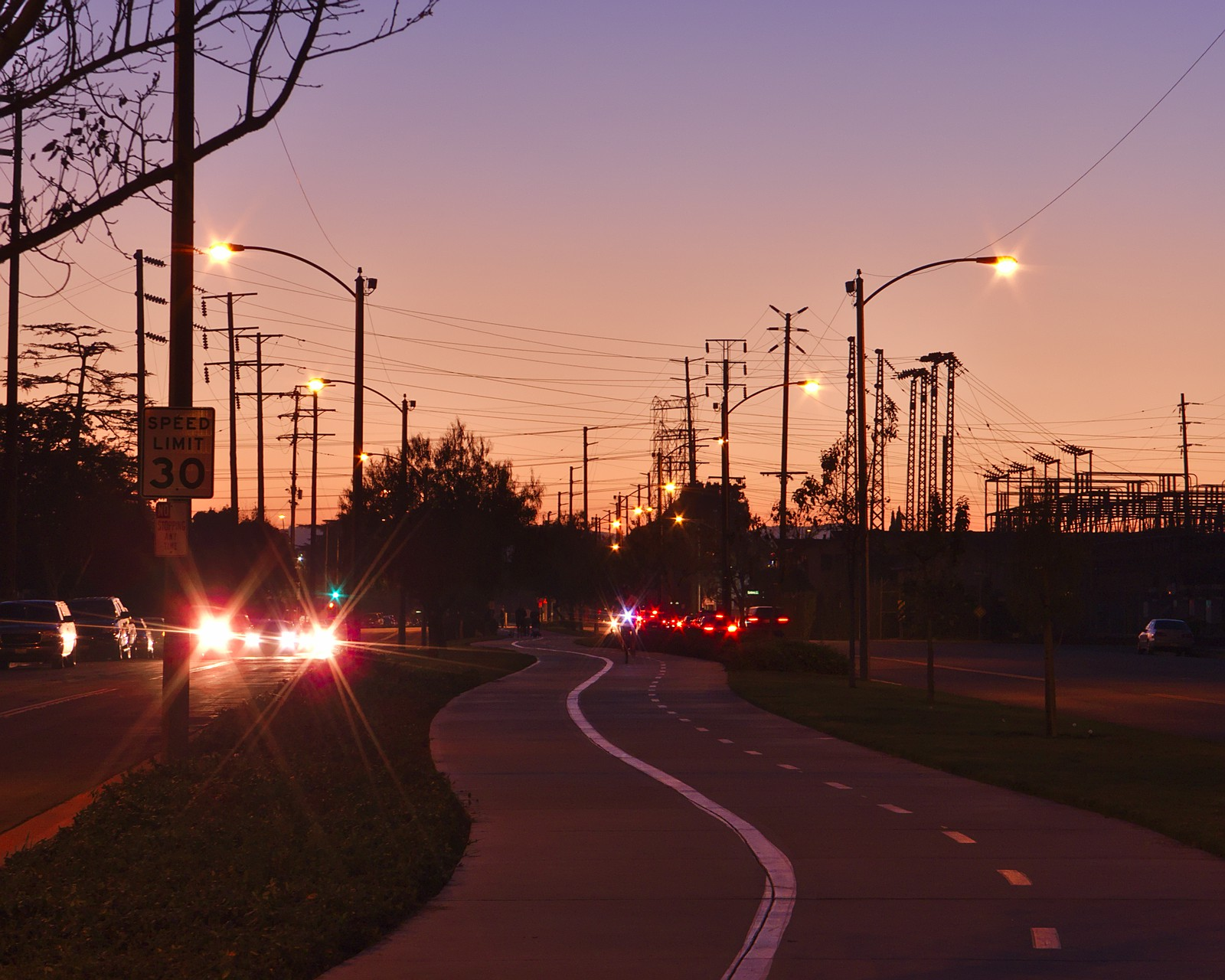
- Bike path, Burbank, evening
- Length: 2.8 mi (4.5 km)
- Location: Los Angeles County
- Established: 2004
- Trailheads: 34.1685°N 118.3701°W, 34.1794°N 118.3243°W
- Use: Active transportation, road biking, pedestrians, dogs on leash
- Difficulty: Easy
- Surface: Asphalt
- Right of way: Southern Pacific Burbank Branch
- Maintained by: LADOT; Burbank Transportation Commission

The Chandler Boulevard Bike Path is a Class I rail trail off-street bike route that runs from North Hollywood to Burbank in Los Angeles County, California.

Chandler Blvd. Bikeway was the Southern Pacific Burbank Branch railroad track until the 1980s. The path has separate bicycle and pedestrian lanes, sculpture, murals, landscaping and views of the Verdugo Mountains. Chandler Boulevard cyclists and pedestrians have “easy access to…shops and restaurants” in the North Hollywood neighborhood of Los Angeles and a “tranquil trip through residential areas” of the incorporated city of Burbank.

The separated section of the bikeway extends from Mariposa Street in Burbank to Vineland Avenue in North Hollywood. The municipal boundary is at Clybourn Avenue. The western end of the bike path is readily accessible from the combined North Hollywood station of B Line train and G Line bus rapid transit route.

The Chandler Boulevard Bike Path is owned by the Los Angeles County Metropolitan Transportation Authority (commonly known as Metro), and is maintained by Los Angeles' and Burbank's respective transportation departments with funding provided by Metro.

== Future improvements and extensions ==
Recent improvements to the North Hollywood section of the bikeway included exercise equipment, a children's playground, a fenced dog run, street furniture, and, at Denny Avenue, a new crosswalk and ADA ramp improvements.

The Chandler Bicycle Connection project, completed 2021, is a Class III 3 mi (4.8 km) sharrows route that connects the end of the Orange Line Bike Path to the beginning of the protected bike route on the median in North Hollywood, Los Angeles. Converting this stretch to protected bike lanes is underway with a projected completion date of 2023.

In 2020, the Burbank City Council approved an extension to the Burbank Metrolink station along a route that will include the under-construction Burbank Channel Bikeway and a connection to the San Fernando Bikeway. It is projected for completion in late 2028.

== See also ==
- List of Los Angeles bike paths
