= Duarte bicycle path =

Bike path in Duarte, California, USA

The Duarte bicycle path is a Class 1 bike path in Duarte, California that parallels Royal Oaks Drive from Buena Vista Street to Royal Oaks Park (Vineyard Ave) for about 1.6 miles (2.6 km).

The trail is paralleled by a wide dirt area on the North side (often used by equestrians, joggers and dog walkers) suitable for mountain bikes.

This bike trail was constructed by the Rails-to-Trails Conservancy and built on the right of way of the Pacific Electric Railway's defunct Monrovia–Glendora Line. The line was critical to the early development of Duarte and Bradbury upon its opening in 1907. However, with the widespread adoption of cars, trucks, and buses in subsequent decades, revenue from passenger traffic, mail delivery, and cargo crashed and the public showed little appetite for investing in rail transit. After a big resurgence during World War II, with rationing and a need for efficiency, ridership crashed again and the Monrovia-Glendora line closed in 1951.

From the end of the trail it is possible to continue on the San Gabriel River Bicycle path via Royal Oaks Drive (East) to Encanto Parkway (South) past Encanto Park and across the River on a bridge on the East side of Encanto Parkway (about 1.2 miles). Royal Oaks Drive and Encanto Pkwy are posted with class 3 bike trail signage, the roads are fairly wide and traffic is light.

From the Encanto Parkway bridge it is possible to go North on the San Gabriel River bicycle path a few miles to the entrance of Azusa Canyon or South to Santa Fe Dam and beyond to the Pacific Ocean.

== Entry points / parking ==
The path is located in a residential area with plenty of parking. There are entry points at the cross streets, of which there are several. There are two drinking fountains near the Royal Oaks Park end of the trail.
