= G Line Bikeway =

Cycle route in Los Angeles, California

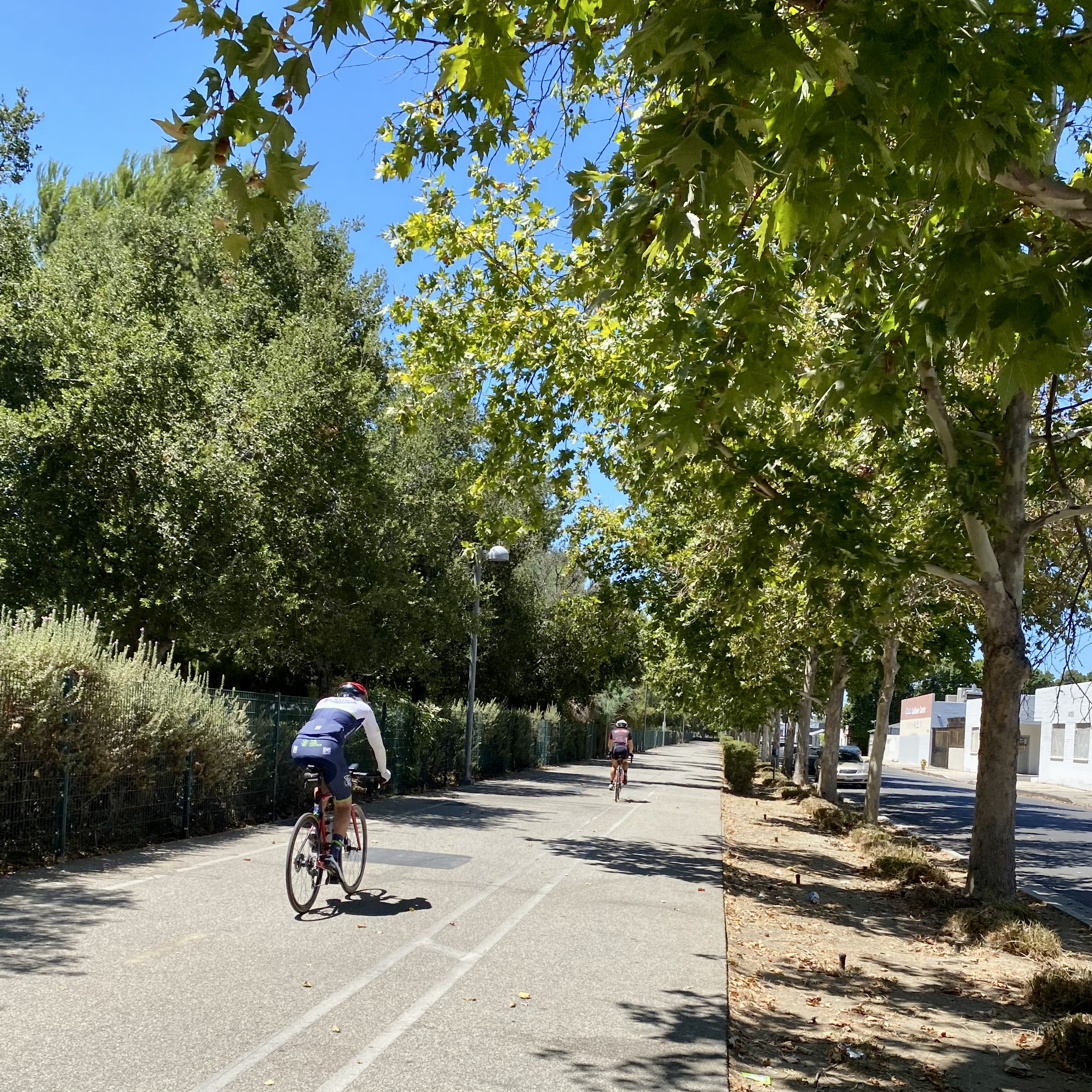
- Bikeway in Van Nuys
- Length: 17.9 mi (28.8 km)
- Location: Los Angeles, California, United States
- Established: 2005
- Completed: 2012
- Trailheads: West: Chatsworth; 34.2529°N 118.5989°W; East: North Hollywood; 34.1689°N 118.3771°W
- Use: Active transportation, road biking, walking, dogs on leash
- Difficulty: Easy
- Surface: asphalt, concrete
- Right of way: G Line
- Maintainer: Los Angeles Metro

The G Line Bikeway is a cycle route in Los Angeles, California, that runs for 17.9 miles (28.8 km) from Chatsworth, through Sepulveda Basin Recreation Area to Valley Glen. It runs alongside the G Line bus rapid transit route, sharing a dedicated right-of-way with it.

The section from Chatsworth station to just east of Valley College station is Class I off-street bike path. The 2 mi (3.2 km) section beginning between Coldwater Canyon Avenue and Fulton Avenue and continuing to North Hollywood station on the easton Chandler Boulevard is Class II on-street bike lane.

One guide to Los Angeles cycling notes that the need for cyclists to stop when the path crosses streets running perpendicular to it inhibits the flow of an uninterrupted ride, making the path better suited to recreational riding than endurance cycling or physical conditioning.

At Chatsworth station, the bikeway connects to the 1.6-mile-long (2.6 km) Browns Creek Bike Path. The bike path also connects readily to the bike paths of the Sepulveda Dam Recreation Area. Because of the long reach of the extended path, this route has been called a “San Fernando Valley commuter corridor” and “the crown jewel of San Fernando Valley bike infrastructure.”

The G Line Bikeway ran alongside Van Nuys station before its closure on February 21, 2025, and 1.36 miles (2.19km) of the Bikeway between Sepulveda Boulevard and Tyrone Avenue were closed along with the station. The Bikeway is planned to be rebuilt along with the construction of a viaduct, but final design has not been finalized or published. During Phase A of construction, the Bikeway detour begins at Sepulveda station, follows Erwin Avenue, Delano Street, and Calvert Street with small north-south sections on Noble and Sylmar Avenues. During Phase B, the detour will become smaller, allowing bike riders to reconnect to the Bikeway at Kester Avenue. The new Van Nuys station will be built on a viaduct, and the closed section of the Bikeway is planned to open completely in December 2027.

== History ==
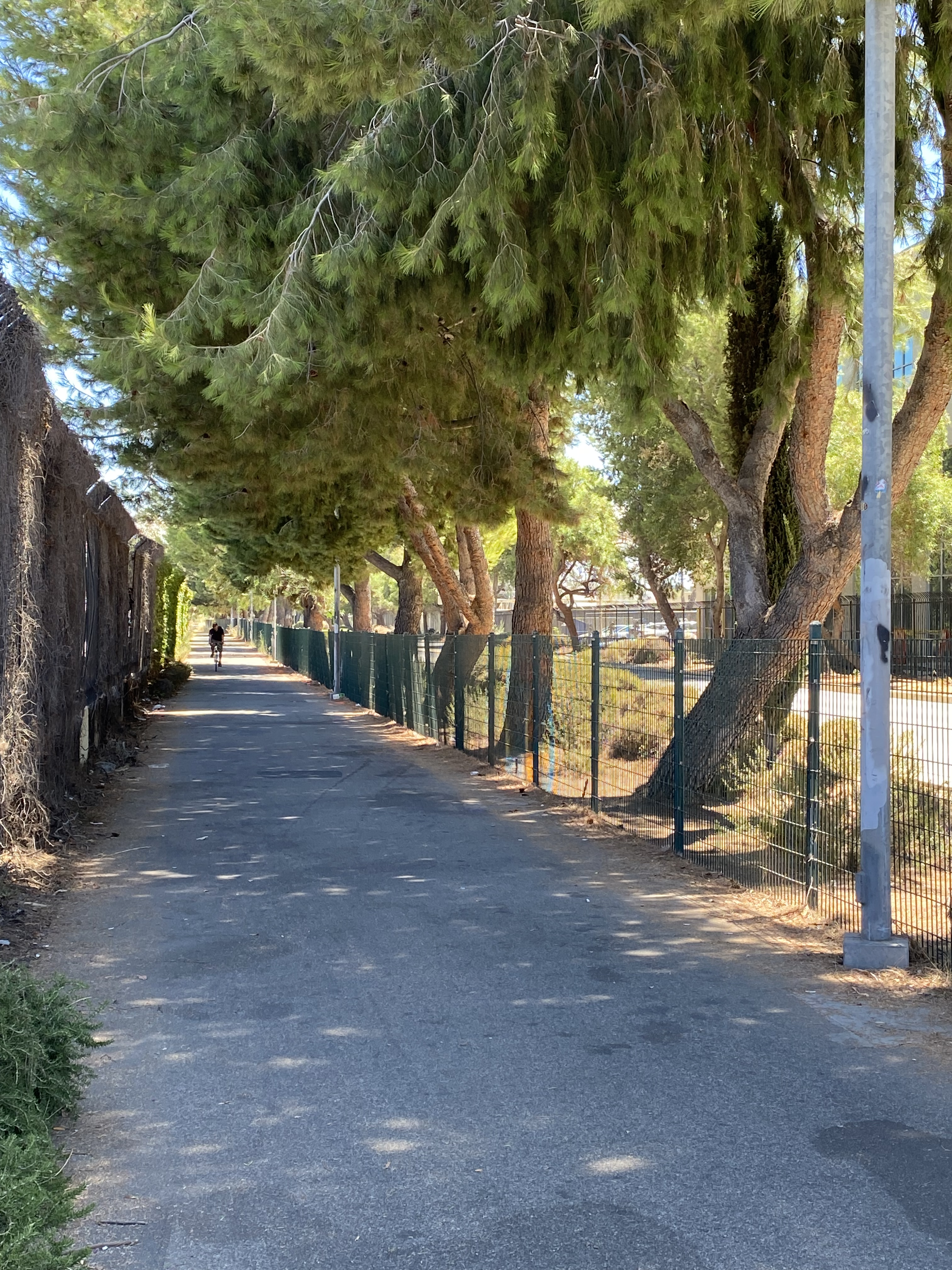
Bikeway at Sepulveda station

The path was opened in 2005 as a 12 mi (19 km) route between Warner Center and North Hollywood along a former railroad right of way used by Southern Pacific and later the Pacific Electric streetcars. The county added 4 mi (6.4 km) in 2012 “between Canoga station and the Chatsworth train station.”

The construction project included bioswales to reduce water pollution from urban runoff and “recycled construction debris from the 405 expansion project “crushed and used as an underground base.”

== Access ==
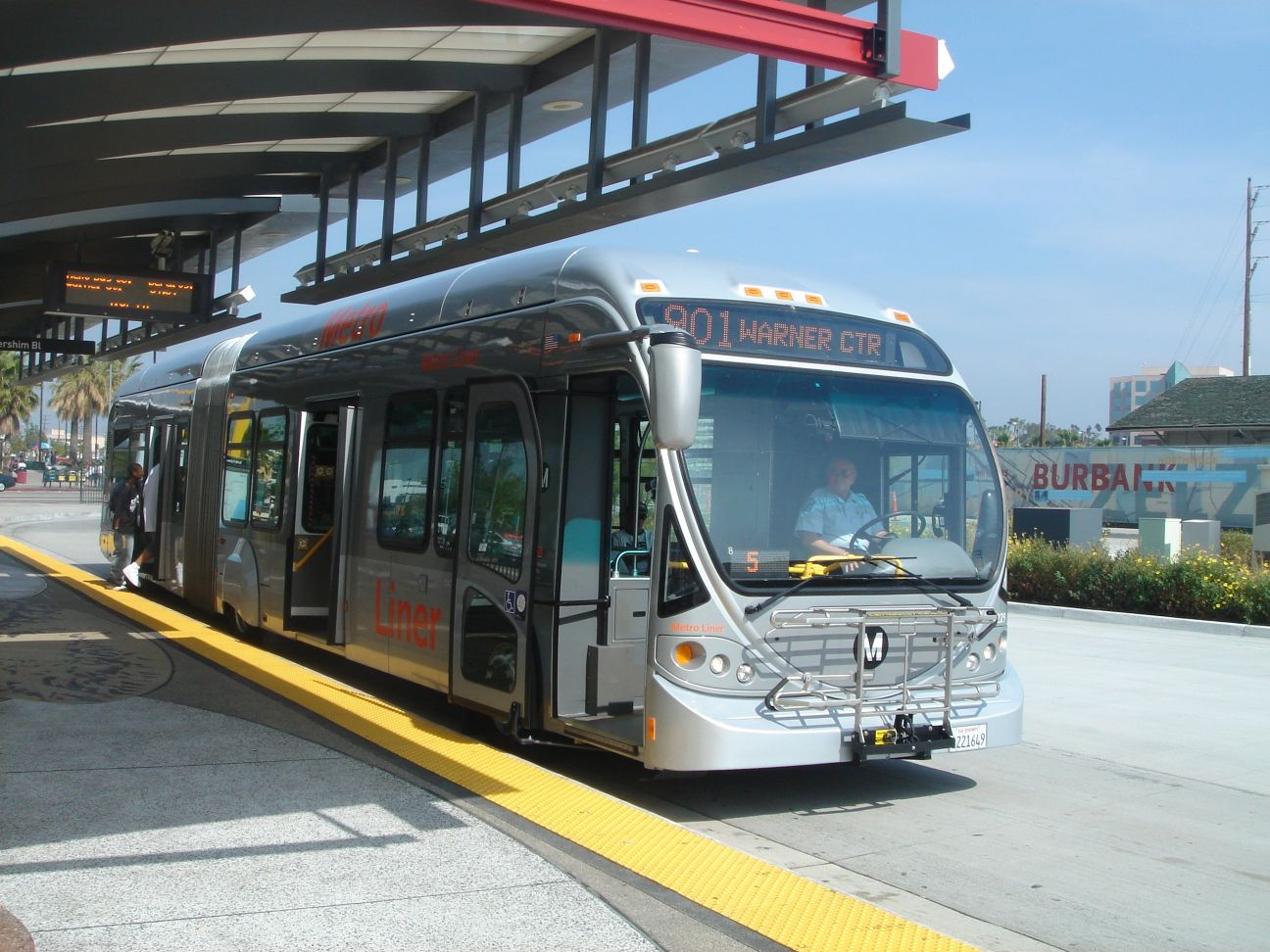
G Line bus with front-end bike rack

According to the website of County Supervisor Zev Yaroslavsky, “Most of the wide, asphalt-surfaced path has separate, dedicated lanes for bicyclists and pedestrians. Still, there are some 'multiuse' areas in which walkers and cyclists will share space. Wider than usual 6 ft (1.8 m) curb ramps also will allow cyclists and pedestrians to get on and off the path more easily, especially when it’s crowded.”

G (Orange) Line buses accommodate up to three bicycles on external racks. Because space can fill rapidly, boarding at the terminal stations in North Hollywood or Chatsworth offers the highest likelihood of available rack space.

A 2015 study of “cycling transit users” (CTUs) of the G Line found: “(1) CTUs are more likely to be stranded during weekday nights due to the proximity to three major colleges; on weekends, CTUs are more likely to be stranded in the mornings; (2) Metro’s policy that increased evening service during 2013 successfully decreased the number of stranded cyclists; and (3) when the racks are two-thirds full, approximately 20 percent of buses will strand at least one cyclist.”

Dedicated ”park and ride” parking lots are available at Chatsworth, Sherman Way, Canoga, Pierce College, Reseda, Balboa, and Sepulveda stations.

There are bike racks at every G Line stop along with bike lockers available for rent.

== Hazards ==
There is a “dangerous blind curve on the east end of the Canoga Avenue station.”

Transient encampments and overgrown landscaping may intermittently obstruct the path.

== See also ==
- List of Los Angeles bike paths
- Expo Bike Path
- Rail to Rail
- Tujunga Greenbelt
