= San Gabriel River =

San Gabriel River is the name of watercourses in two states:

- San Gabriel River (California)
  - San Gabriel River bicycle path (California)
- San Gabriel River (Texas)

== See also ==
- Interstate 605 (California), also known as the San Gabriel River Freeway
