= Coyote Creek bicycle path =

Cycling route in California, US

Coyote Creek Bike Path
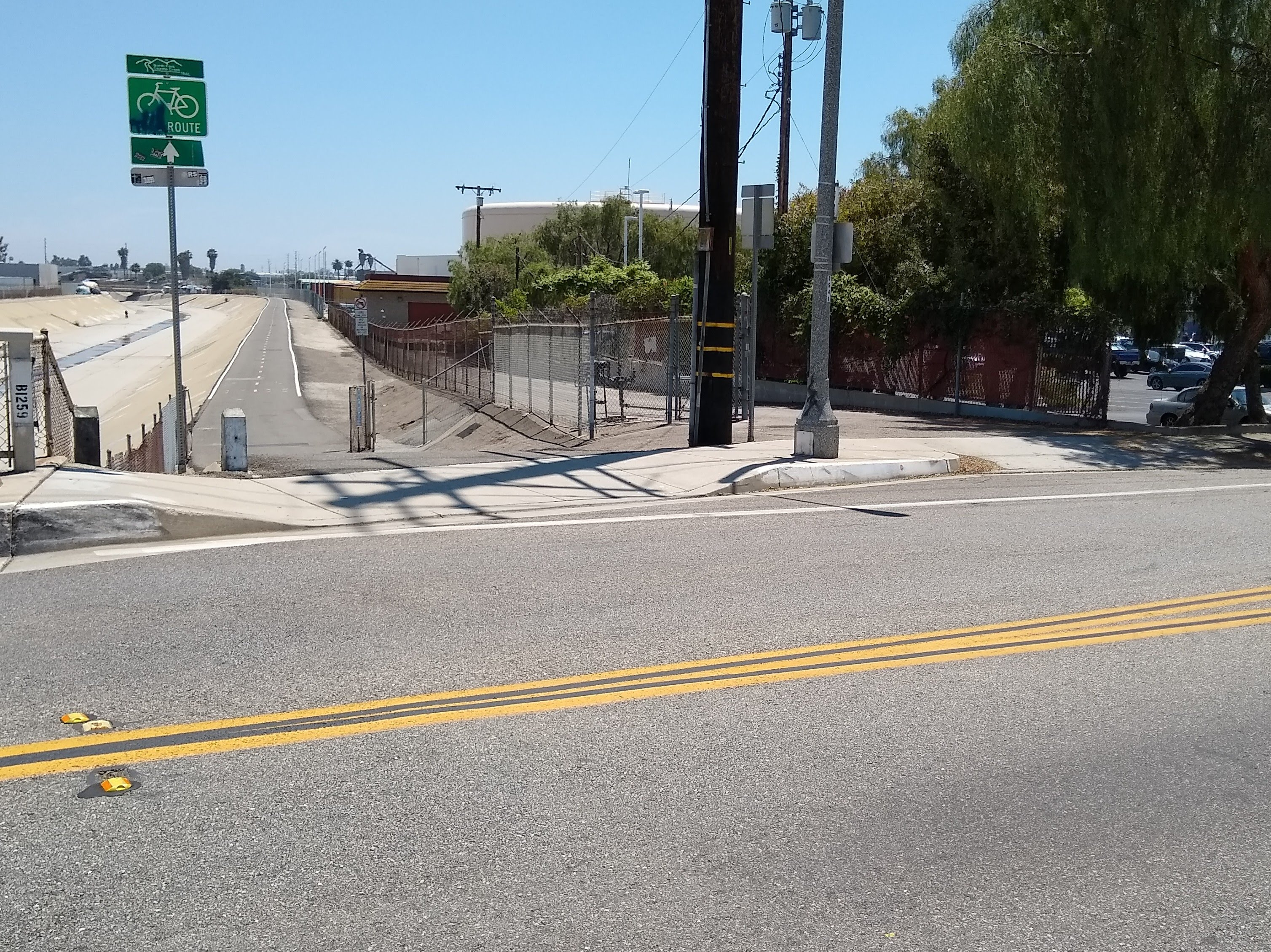
- Northern end along Foster Road in Santa Fe Springs
- Length: 9.5 mi (15.3 km)
- Location: Los Angeles County
- Use: Active transportation, road biking, walking, dogs on leash
- Difficulty: Easy
- Surface: asphalt

The Coyote Creek bikeway is a Class 1 bike path in Los Angeles County that runs adjacent to the Coyote Creek flood control channel for approximately 9.5 miles. The bike path is controlled by Caltrans. The path begins in Santa Fe Springs on the North fork of the Coyote Creek and extends south into Long Beach where it joins the San Gabriel River bicycle path at the trail bridge just South of Willow Street/Katella Avenue.

Coyote Creek separates Los Angeles County and Orange County. A curious feature of the bikeway is that many of the east–west streets that intersect the flood control channel change names as they cross over.

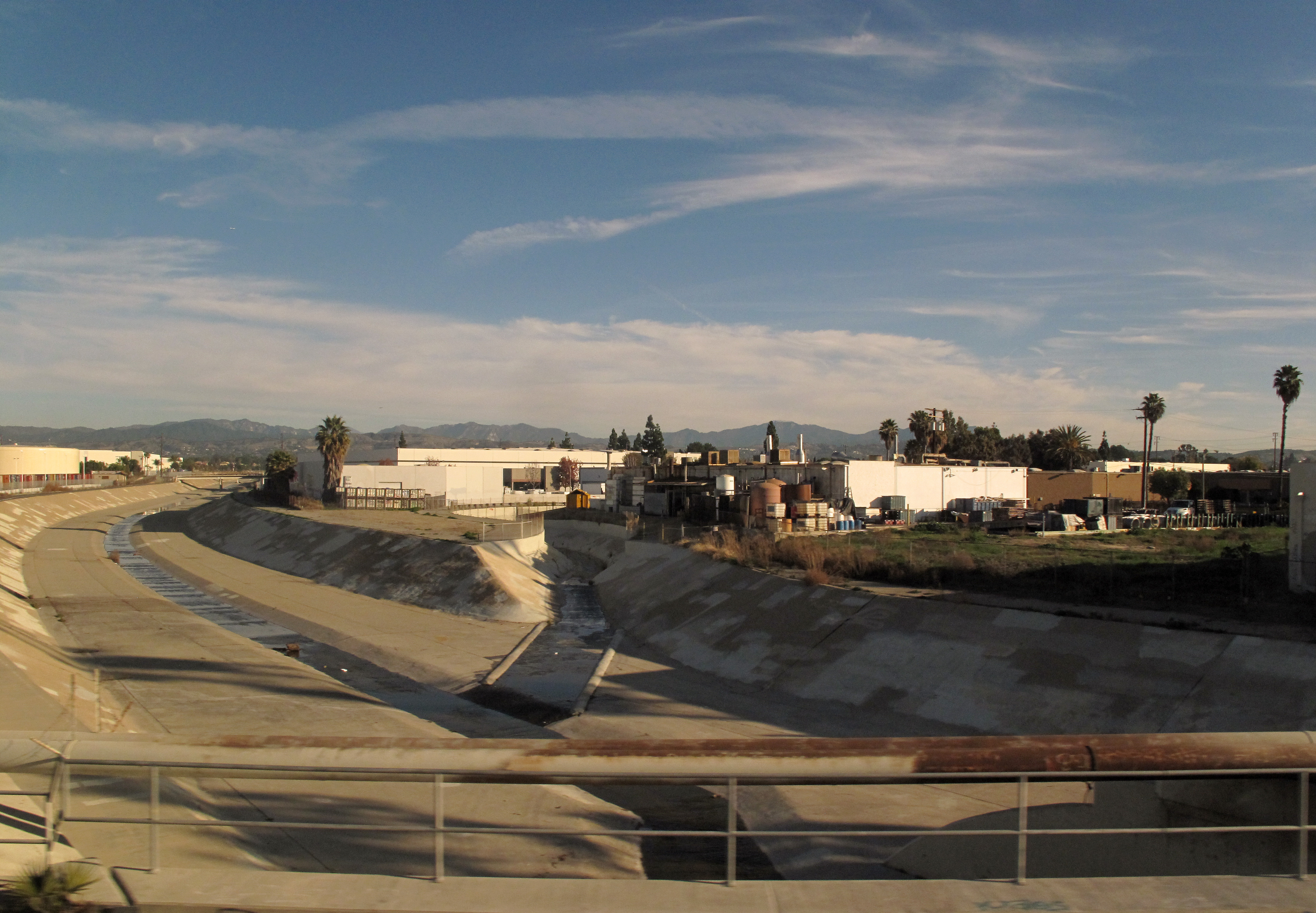
Creek with path on the left

The bikeway is generally devoid of scenery. The northern section of the bikeway passes through industrial neighborhoods consisting of warehouses and light manufacturing. The middle section, from State Route 91 to Ball Road/Wardlow, cuts through residential neighborhoods. There is convenient access to the Don Knabe Community Regional Park, just north of La Palma Avenue/Del Amo Boulevard. The bikeway crosses from the West to the East side of the channel at Centralia Road.

The Southern section of the bikeway passes adjacent a collection of zones: light industrial, apartments, schools, etc. In that area there is a simple bike maintenance station, including a tire pump, at a small walking park that is parallel to the bike path and just north of the 605 Freeway.

During dry weather Coyote Creek has just a trickle of water. However, on 22 January 2017 a heavy rain storm passed through southern California. This video shows how water from the storm filled up Coyote Creek.

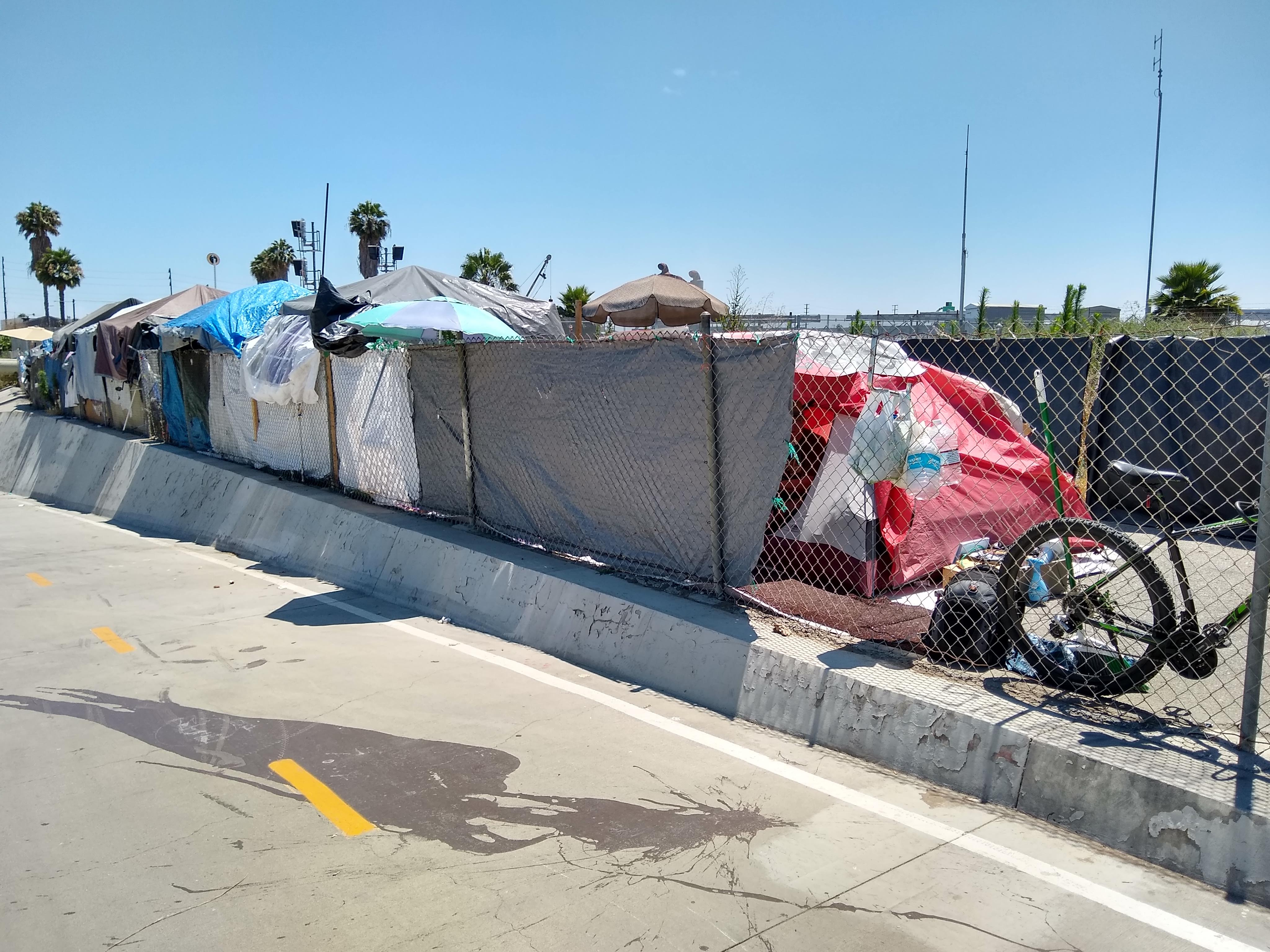
There are several homeless encampments along the Coyote Creek Bikeway, especially North of Interstate 5.

== Maintenance ==
The flood control channel is managed by the Los Angeles County Department of Public Works.

Crossing at I-5 reopened with an improved trail in early June, 2015.

== Future plans ==
The OCTA Commuter Strategic Bikeways Plan (CSBP) calls for extension of the Coyote Creek Bikeway from Walker Street in La Palma to Imperial Highway and Beach Boulevard in La Habra. Currently the cities of La Habra and La Mirada have opened the northern section of this bikeway from Rosecrans Avenue to Imperial Highway.

Just north of Rosecrans Avenue a bridge has been installed, allowing direct access from Behringer Park in La Mirada.
