= Tujunga Wash Greenway =

Cycling route in California, US

Tujunga Wash Bike Path
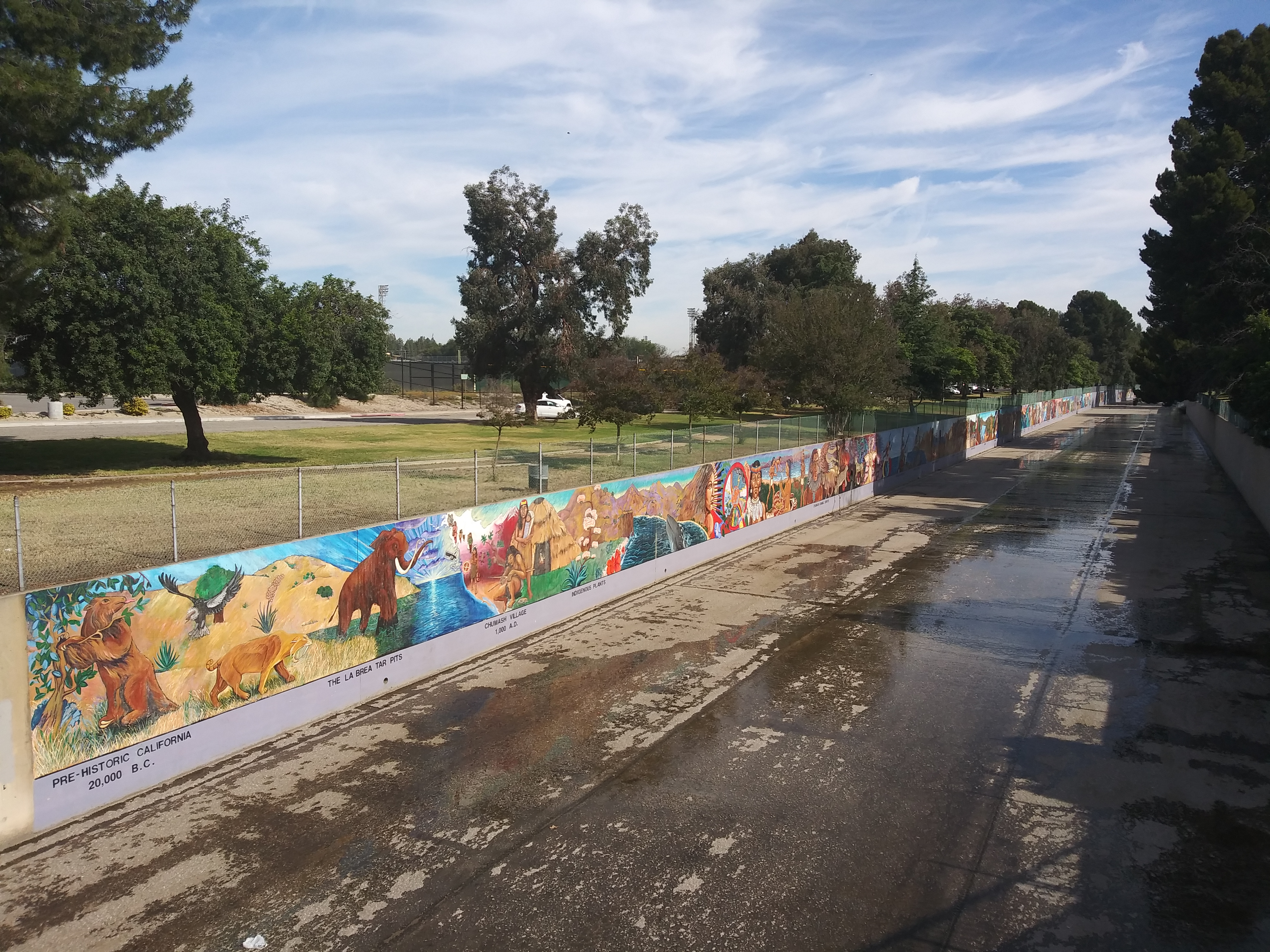
- Mural: “Great Wall of Los Angeles”
- Length: 2.5 mi (4.0 km)
- Location: San Fernando Valley
- Trailheads: South: Tujunga Wash and Oxnard Street; North: Tujunga Wash and Vanowen Street
- Use: Active transportation, road biking, walking, dogs on leash
- Difficulty: Easy
- Surface: asphalt, concrete, gravel

The Tujunga Wash Greenway and Bike Path is a trail and stormwater mitigation project in the Valley Village and Valley Glen neighborhoods of California’s San Fernando Valley.

Tujunga Wash is a tributary of the Los Angeles River; Tujunga has its own tributary, Pacoima Wash. The wash was channelized for flood control by the U.S. Army Corps of Engineers in the 1950s.

Created between 2007 and 2012, the 2.5-mile (4.0 km)-long greenbelt extends from Oxnard Street in the south to Vanowen Street in the north. It “takes urban runoff from the flood control channel and creates a new stream with some of the natural characteristics from the Tujunga Wash, while native plants in the streambed help clean the water and establish habitat for animals such as birds, frogs and lizards.” The naturalized side channel within the greenway is a bioswale that recharges groundwater with an average of 350,000 U.S. gallons (1,300,000 L) annually. The 15-acre (61,000 m^{2}) riparian habitat lies within a 50-foot-wide (15 m) greenbelt.

Designed to attract both “migratory birds and pedestrians,” the Los Angeles Times said the beautification project “combines art and nature,” with the art aspect being the sculpted metal gates at the bike path entrances and the Great Wall of Los Angeles mural that has been called “a California history lesson in sixth-tenths of a mile.”

The Class I bike path runs for .5 miles (0.80 km) from Oxnard Street to Burbank Boulevard between the neighborhoods of the Van Nuys and North Hollywood. The road surface is mix of concrete, asphalt and gravel.

At its southern terminus of Chandler Boulevard the Tujunga Wash Bike Path intersects with the 14-mile (23 km) G Line Bikeway.

There are access points at the corner of Laurel Canyon Boulevard and Oxnard Street, as well as Fallbrook Avenue, Lassen Street, Coldwater Canyon Drive, Nordhoff Street, Saticoy Street, and DeSoto Avenue. One local guide advises, “There are crossings every quarter-mile or so, except for about one mile in between Coldwater Canyon and Busch Motorway, where there are no crossings until it hits Saticoy Street.”

== See also ==
- List of Los Angeles bike paths
- Great Wall of Los Angeles
- G Line Bikeway
