= Rio Hondo bicycle path =

Cycling route in California, USA

Coordinates: 34.02503°N 118.08350°W

Rio Hondo Bike Path
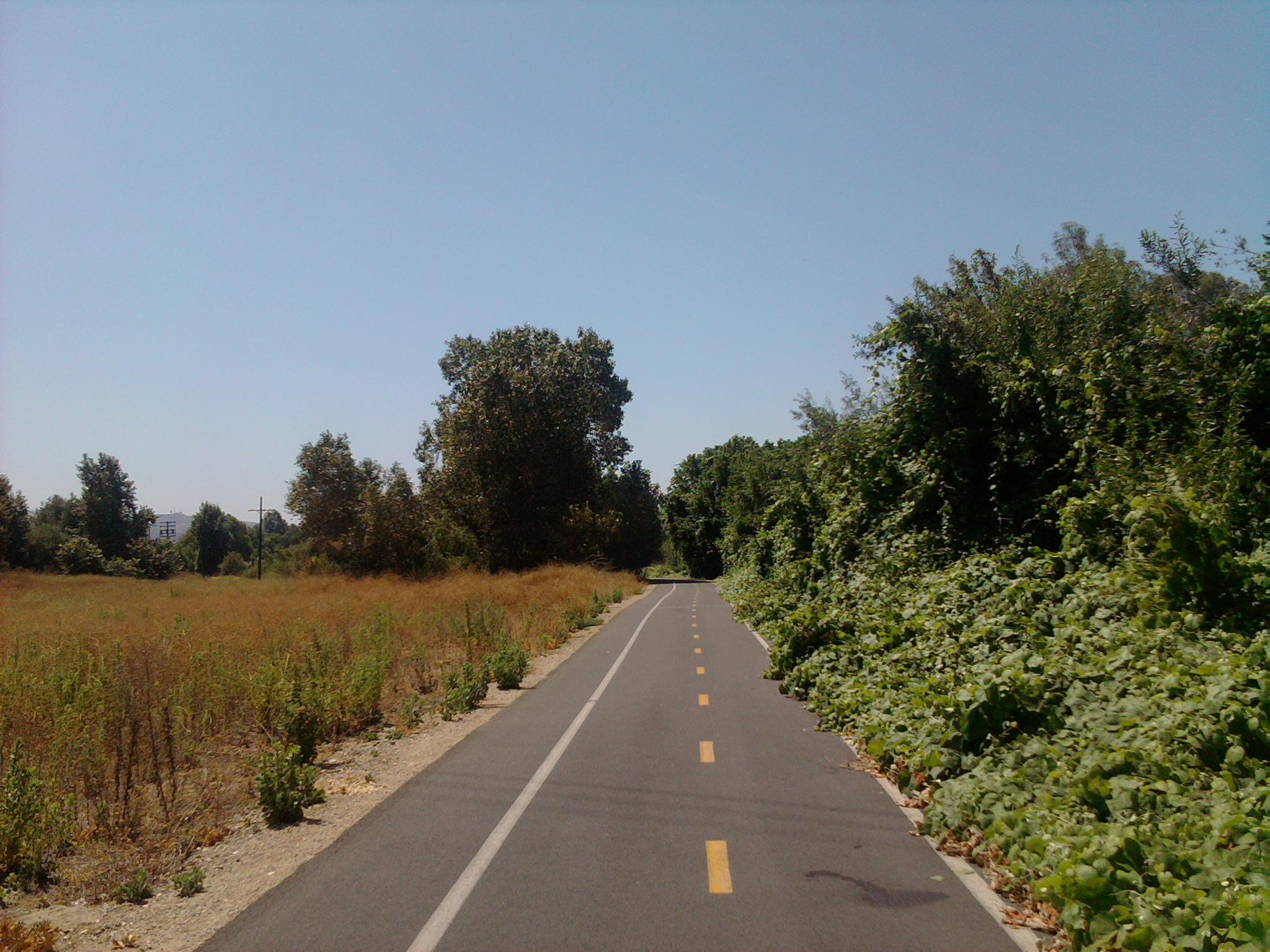
- Between El Monte Airport and Rosemead Blvd
- Length: 1.6 mi (2.6 km)
- Location: Los Angeles County
- Use: Active transportation, road biking, walking, dogs on leash
- Difficulty: Easy
- Surface: asphalt

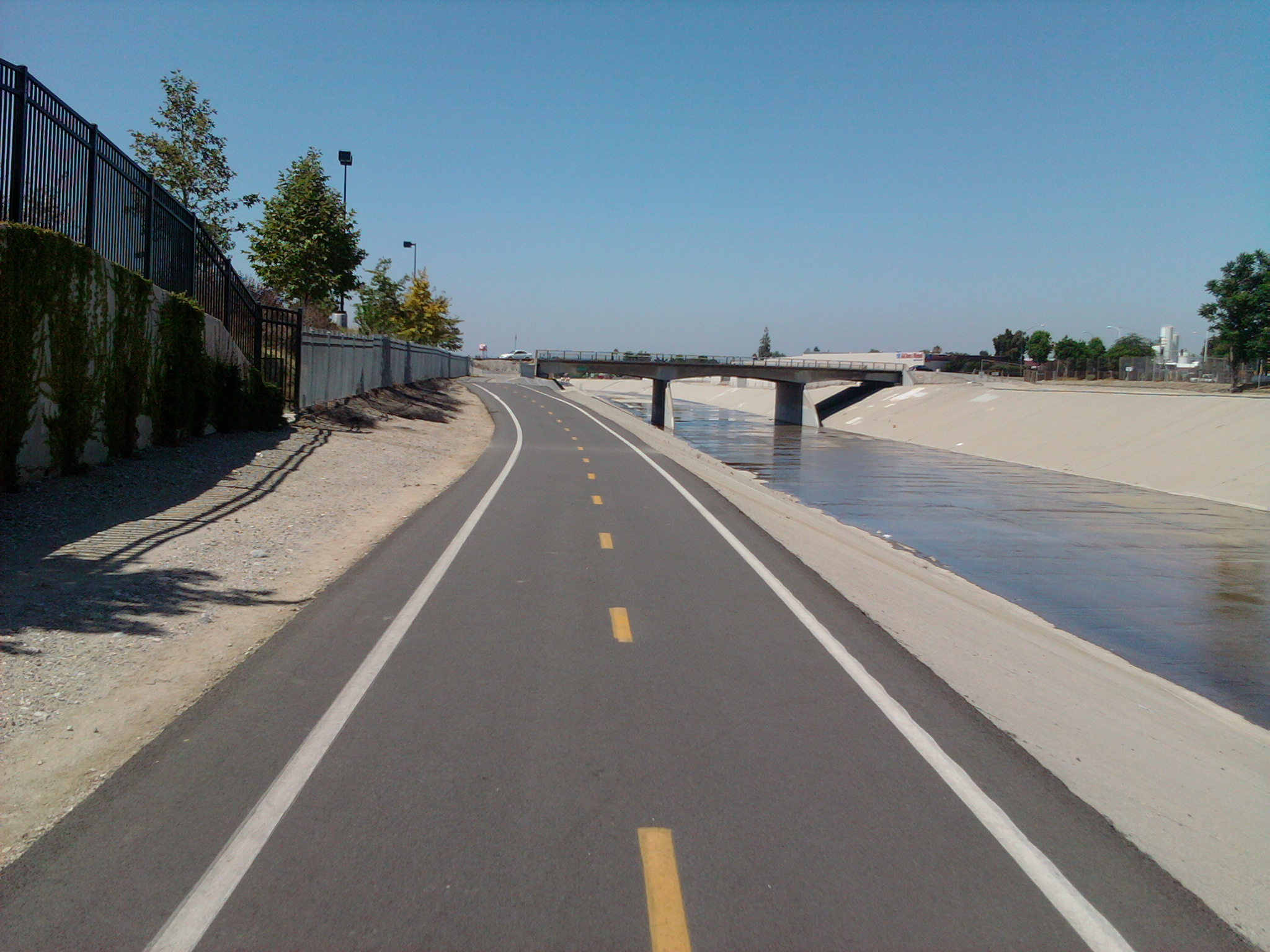
Rio Hondo bike path at Rosemead Blvd

The Rio Hondo Bike Path is a bicycle path that parallels the Rio Hondo (creek) through the San Gabriel Valley, in eastern Los Angeles County, California. The path is gently graded, and has sections with more greenery and mature trees than other bicycle paths in the area. Rio Hondo means deep river in Spanish.

The proximity of the Rio Hondo Bike Path to the central regional transit hub at the El Monte station, including the Los Angeles Metro Busway J Line, makes it one of the most accessible routes to access a variety of bike paths and local parks.

== Route ==
The northern start of the Rio Hondo Bike Path is at the Peck Road Water Conservation Park in the southern Monrovia area.

From there, the southbound path follows along a rural stream bed through the Whittier Narrows Recreation Area. One can connect to the San Gabriel River bicycle path via the Legg Lake bicycle path here. The Rio Hondo bike path continues south and joins Los Angeles River bicycle path at the confluence of the Rio Hondo and Los Angeles River in South Gate. The L.A. River bike path continues to downtown Long Beach, ending by the Pacific Ocean.
