= Shoreline Pedestrian Bikepath =

Bike Path and walk route in Long Beach, California

Long Beach Bike Path
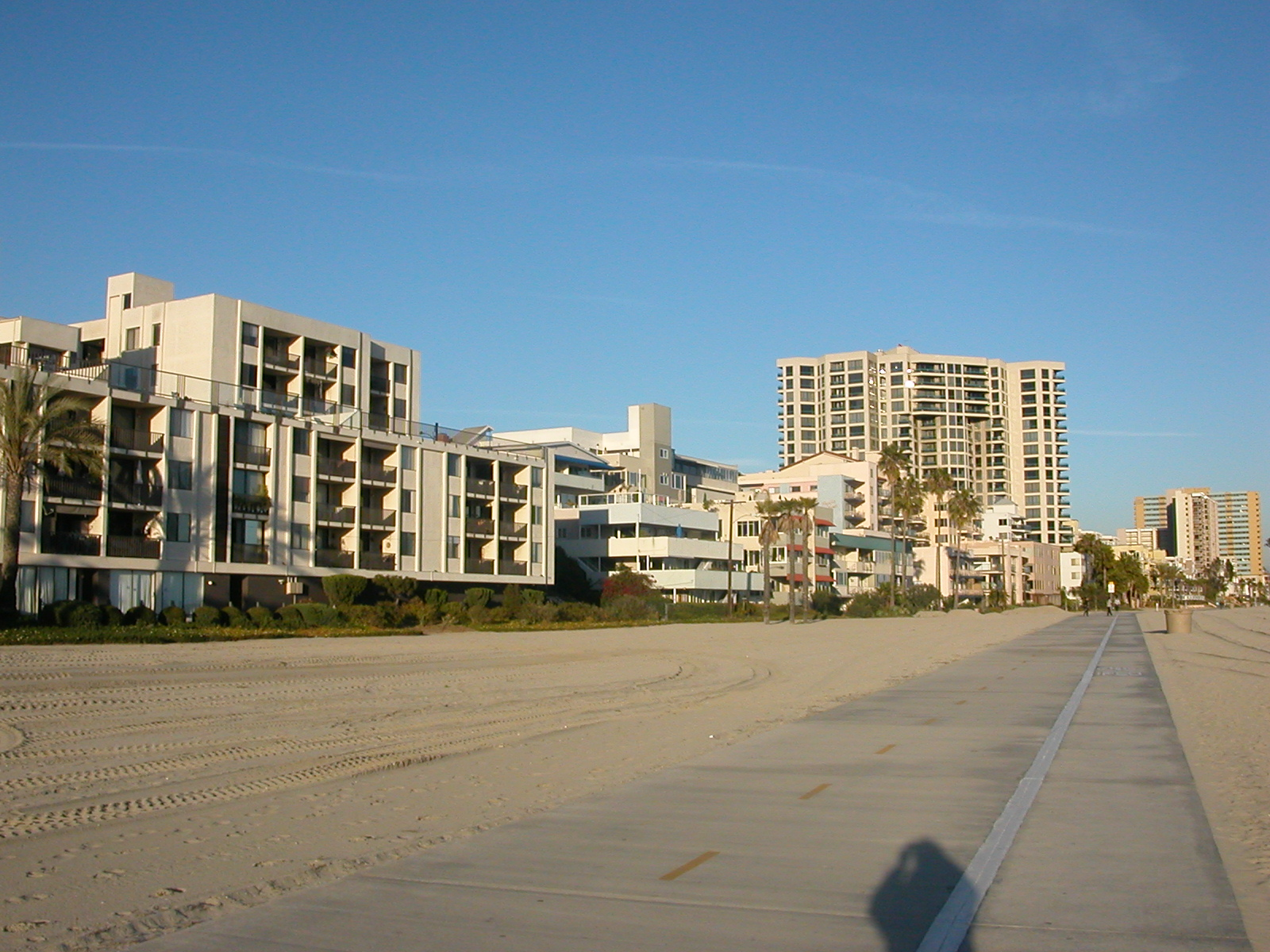
- Bikepath before the completion of the parallel pedestrian path
- Length: 4.5
- Location: Long Beach, California
- Use: Mixed
- Website: longbeach.gov

The Shoreline Pedestrian Bikepath also known as the Long Beach Bike Path is a 4.5-mile (7.2 km) path along the Pacific Ocean from Shoreline Village in downtown Long Beach, California to Belmont Shore, Los Angeles County. It was completed in 1988 and is used by walkers, joggers, and skaters. In 2013 the California Coastal Commission approved a second path for pedestrians to run parallel to the path used primarily by bicyclists.

== History ==
The Long Beach Bike path was originally proposed in the late 1970s but local residents resisted the bike path as it was felt it would be an eyesore. That opposition faded away with time. Final plans for the path were ordered by the Long Beach City Council in 1986 with a budget of $1.4 million.

== See also ==
- CicLAvia
- Los Angeles River Bikeway (LARIO), a 29.1-mile (46.8 km) bikeway runs along the east side of the Los Angeles River and extends to the Downtown Marina and the Shoreline Aquatic Park Bike Trail.
- San Gabriel River Bike Trail, a 28-mile (45 km) bikeway along the San Gabriel River through El Dorado Regional Park and extends to the street surface bike trail near the Alamitos Bay Marina.
- El Dorado Park Bike Path, a 4-mile (6.4 km) bikeway runs through the 450-acre (180 ha) scenic El Dorado Regional Park. It connects with the San Gabriel River Bike Trail at various locations.
- Heartwell Park Bike Path, a 2.5-mile (4.0 km) bikeway runs through the 162-acre (66 ha) Heartwell Park. It connects with the San Gabriel River Bike Trail and various Class II bike paths.
