= Whittier Narrows =

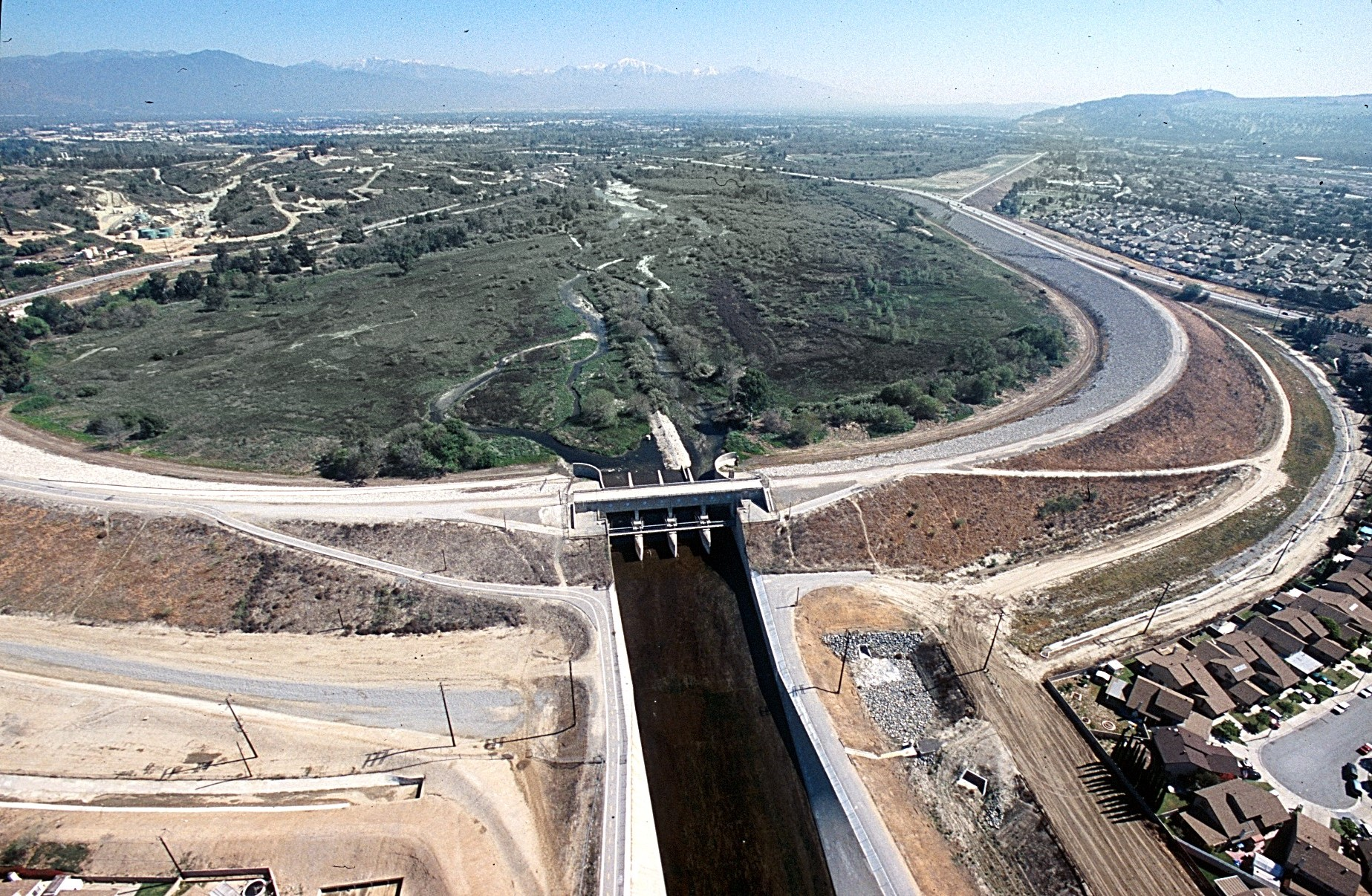
- Aerial view of Whittier Narrows Dam from downstream looking upstream through the gap.
- Interactive map of Whittier Narrows
- Elevation: 183 ft (56 m)
- Traversed by: I-605, SR 19

Location
- Location: North of Whittier, California
- Range: Puente Hills / Montebello Hills
- Coordinates: 34°01′45″N 118°02′58″W

The Whittier Narrows is a narrows or water gap in the San Gabriel Valley of Los Angeles County, California, United States, between the Puente Hills to the east and the Montebello Hills, part of the Repetto Hills, to the west. The gap is located at the southern boundary of the San Gabriel Valley, through which the Rio Hondo and the San Gabriel River flow to enter the Los Angeles Basin. The Narrows is located near the convergence of Interstate 605 (the San Gabriel River Freeway) and California State Route 60 (the Pomona Freeway).

== History ==
The Tongva village of Shevaanga was located in the northern areas of the Whittier Narrows. The first European land exploration of Alta California, the Spanish Portolá expedition, traversed Whittier Narrows on its return journey to San Diego. He wrote that the natives "presented us fish, hare, nuts, pine nuts, acorns, and other seeds prepared after their fashion". On the outbound journey, the party had followed San Jose Creek, reaching the San Gabriel River north of the Narrows. Franciscan missionary Juan Crespi noted in his diary, "We started out in the morning through the gap of the valley of San Miguel [now San Gabriel], which is very full of trees. We traveled a long while to the southwest on the edge of the stream, which, rising from a copious spring of water in the same gap, merits now the name of river; its plain is covered with willows and some slender cotton woods."

From the exploration Mission Vieja was built at Whittier Narrows in 1771. A flood in 1776 caused Mission Vieja to move to Mission San Gabriel Arcángel in San Gabriel. Whittier Narrows was the meeting point for boundary corners of several land-grant ranchos, created during the Spanish-Mexican era, including the Rancho Paso de Bartolo.

On October 1, 1987, at 7:42 a.m. PDT, the 5.9 M_{w} Whittier Narrows earthquake affected the Greater Los Angeles Area with a maximum Mercalli intensity of VIII (Severe).

In October 2008, a proposed new interpretive center drew controversy over the potential destruction of mature wildlife habitats within the Whittier Narrows Nature Center.

Due to the Los Angeles County's budget cuts, the Whittier Narrows became one of six regional parks closed on Mondays and Tuesdays, starting from June 30, 2025.

== Whittier Narrows Recreation Area ==
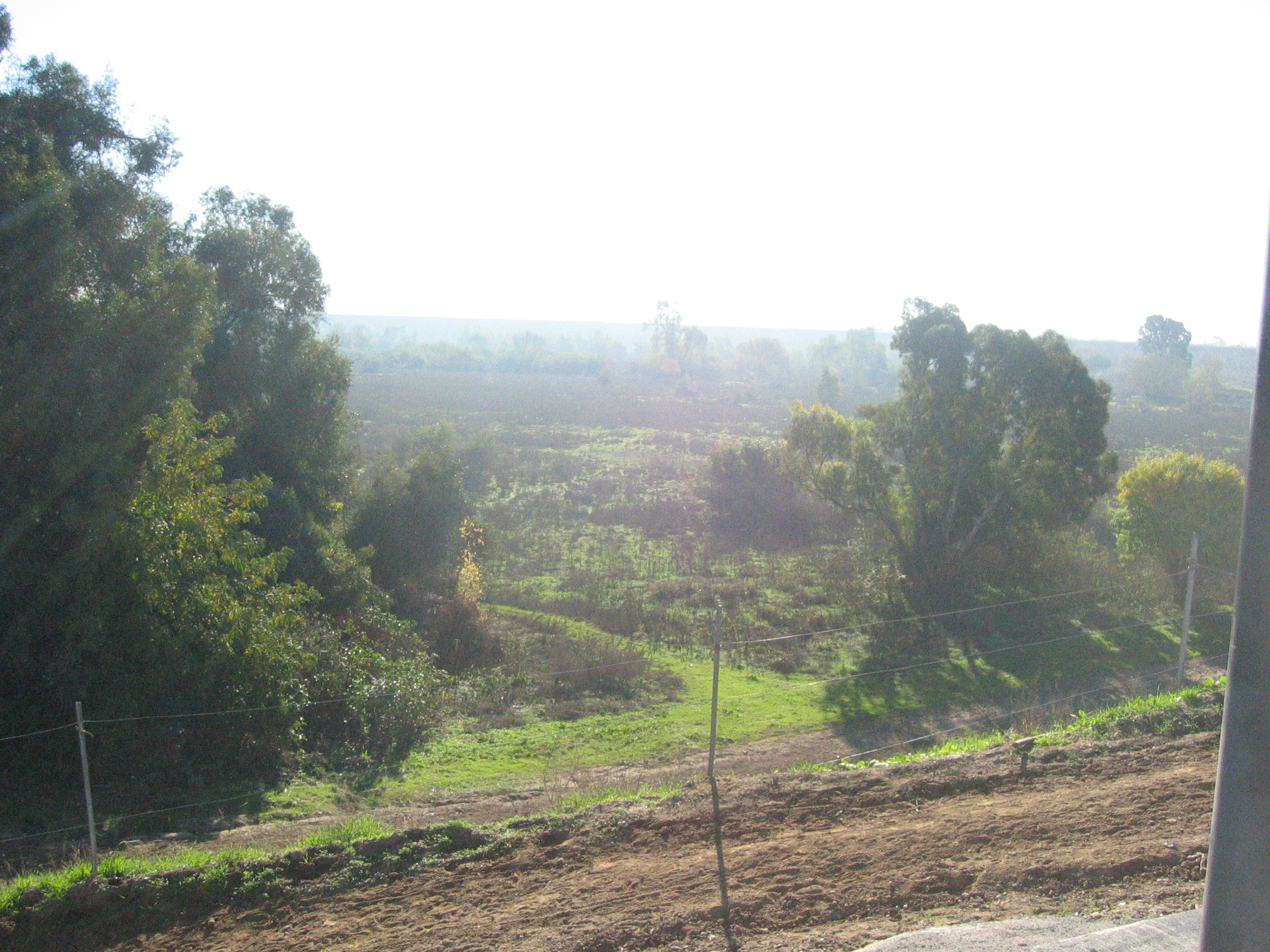
View north of the Whittier Narrows Dam

The Whittier Narrows Recreation Area is a 1,500-acre (6.1 km^{2}) multi-use facility, mostly in an unincorporated part of Los Angeles County, containing North Lake, Center Lake, and Legg Lake (where radio-controlled model speedboats may be operated), a rifle and pistol shooting range, numerous softball and soccer fields with picnic tables, a paved airstrip for radio-controlled hobby aircraft, a tether car race track, a USA BMX race track, and a connector trail between the Class I Rio Hondo bicycle path and the San Gabriel River bicycle path.

The place also has boat ride areas that can be used when paid, bike rides, and rentals. There is also a playground for other people to enjoy.

The park is roughly bordered by Garvey Avenue and San Gabriel Blvd to the north and west and Durfee Avenue and Santa Anita/Merced Avenues to the south and east. A convenient point of access is the Rosemead Blvd (State Route 19) exit south from the Pomona (60) Freeway.

Within the Recreation Area is the Whittier Narrows Nature Center, which contains exhibits about the plants and animals of the river environment, including live displays. The center offers public programs, lectures, ranger tours, and education programs.

Dragon sculptures by Benjamin Dominquez can be seen here; others are at Laguna de San Gabriel Nautical Playground at Vincent Lugo Park in San Gabriel.

== Whittier Narrows Dam ==
The Whittier Narrows Dam is a flood control and water conservation project constructed and operated by the U.S. Army Corps of Engineers, Los Angeles District. It collects runoff from the uncontrolled drainage areas upstream along with releases from the Santa Fe Dam, and can redirect flows into the Rio Hondo or the downstream San Gabriel. It was completed in 1957.

== See also ==
- Battle of Rio San Gabriel
