= Los Angeles River Bikeway =

Cycling route in California, US

Los Angeles River Bikeway (LARIO)
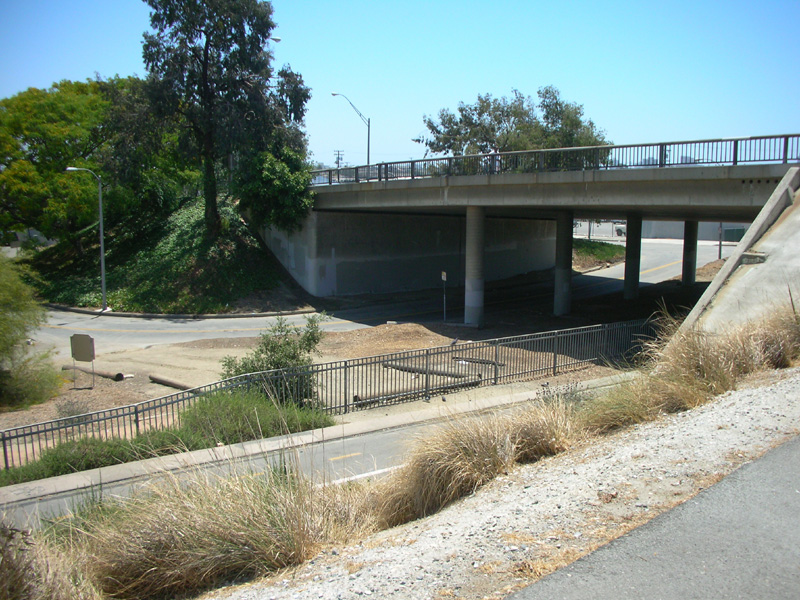
- Bikeway access at the PCH in Long Beach.
- Length: 29.1 mi (46.8 km)
- Location: Long Beach, California
- Trailheads: South: 33.8049°N 118.2042°W at DeForest Ave. North: 33.9303°N 118.1768°W at Imperial Highway
- Use: Commute, recreation
- Surface: Concrete, asphalt

Los Angeles River Bikeway, also known as LARIO, is a 29.1 mi (46.8 km) bikeway along the lower Los Angeles River in southern Los Angeles County, California. It is one of the completed sections of the Los Angeles River Bicycle Path planned to run along the entire 51 miles (82 km) length of the LA River.

As any trail project along the LA River, it is part of the National Park Service Juan Bautista de Anza National Historic Trail.

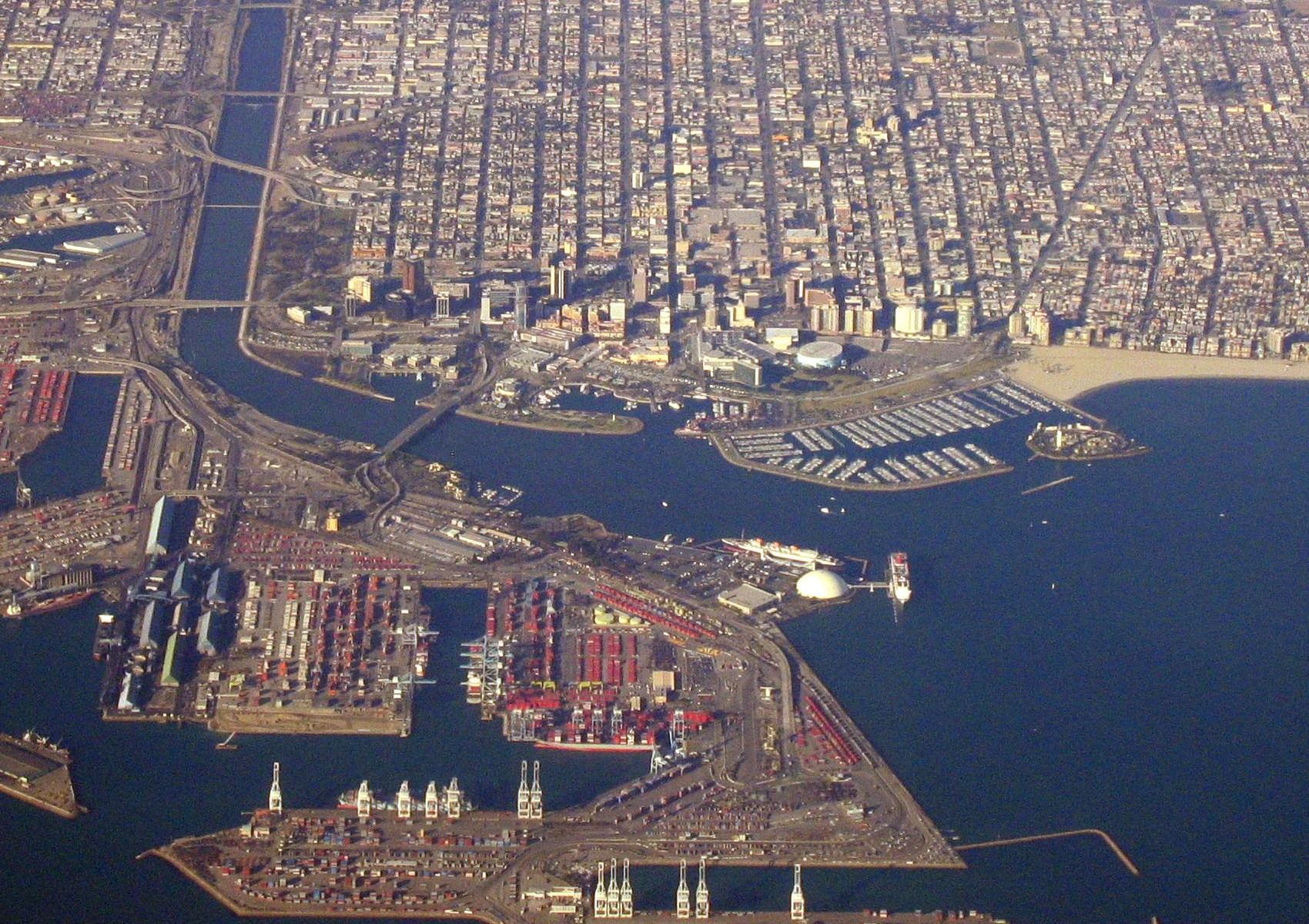
Lower section and mouth of the Los Angeles River in Long Beach.

The paved bikeway runs along the east side of the river from Willow Street in Long Beach to the Imperial Highway. Mileage markers are painted on the pavement and signs are posted at regular intervals detailing upcoming city streets.

The Santa Monica Conservancy, Friends of the Los Angeles River, the city of Los Angeles, the county of Los Angeles, advisory committees and task forces, the Los Angeles City Council, various state propositions (generally serving as funding sources) and the U.S. Army Corps of Engineers have all been stakeholders involved in creating the Los Angeles River Bikeway.

== See also ==
- CicLAvia
- Shoreline Pedestrian Bikepath
- San Gabriel River Bike Trail
- Los Angeles River bicycle path — for all sections along the Los Angeles River.
- Bike paths in Los Angeles
