= San Gabriel River Bike Trail =

Cycling route in Southern California, USA

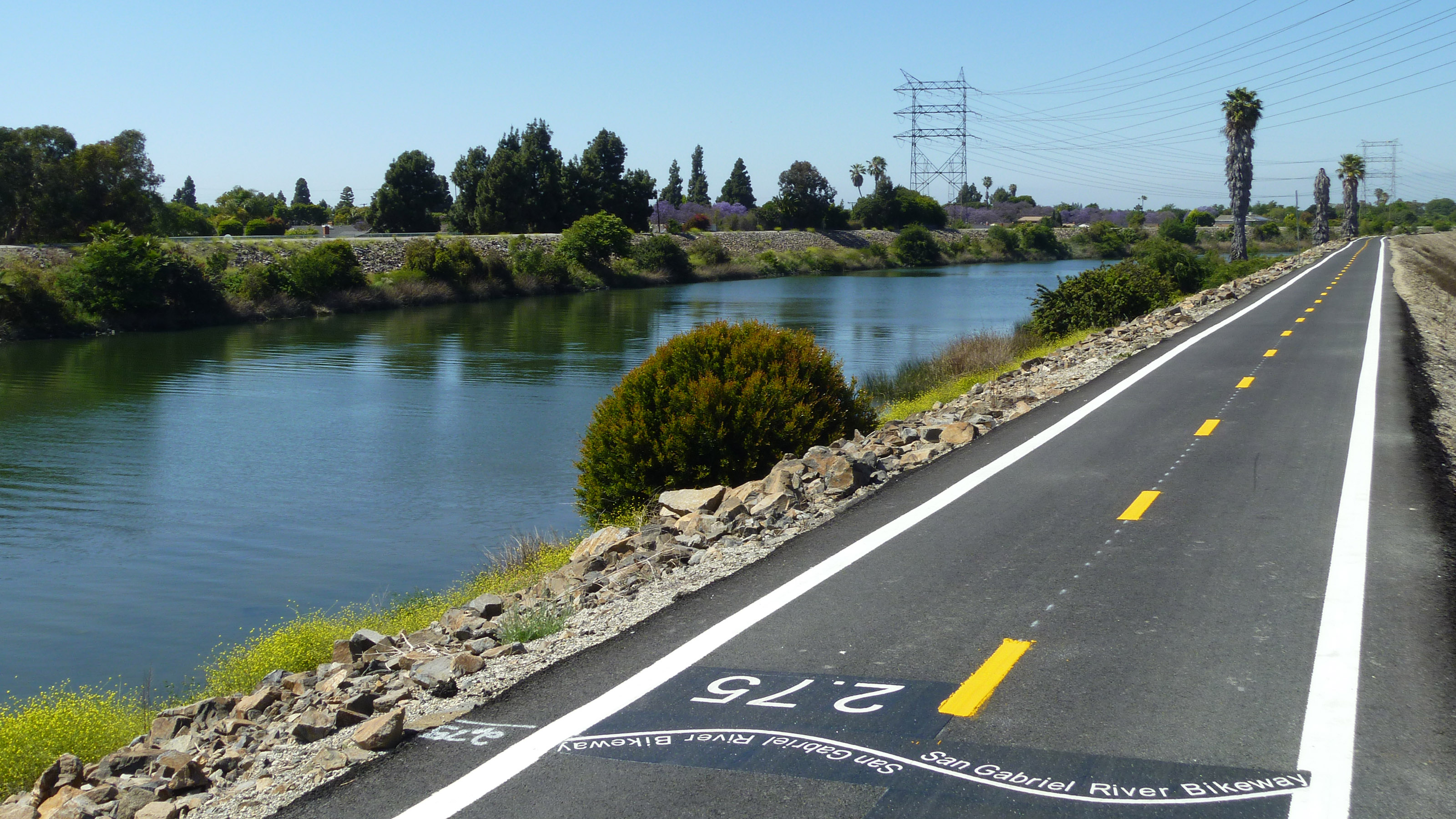
- San Gabriel River Bike Trail
- Length: 28 mi (45 km)
- Use: Mixed
- Website: lacounty.gov

The San Gabriel River Trail (also known as SGRT) is a 28-mile (45 km) bike path along the San Gabriel River through El Dorado Regional Park and onto street bike trails near the Alamitos Bay Marina in Los Angeles County, California. The South end is Seal Beach. The northern segment begins near Whittier Narrows Recreation Area.

Traveling north from Wilderness Park, the path switches from the East side of the river to the West side of the river over the San Gabriel River Parkway Bridge, which is designated as a bike route by the city of Pico Rivera.

From Whittier Narrows, the path follows the River north into South El Monte, Baldwin Park and Irwindale to the Santa Fe Dam. The path crosses the river on Arrow Highway next to the main spillway, then loops back to climb a steep ramp up to the rim of the dam. The path traces the rim of the dam around to the east of the flood basin and park, with access at Azusa Canyon Drive (main entrance to park). The path ends at State Route 39 where it exits the canyon in the north of Azusa.

There is a connection from Duarte/City of Hope station of the A Line to the San Gabriel River bike trail called the Emerald Necklace Gateway.

== Trail highlights ==
- South of the San Bernardino Freeway (I-10), under the Southern Pacific (Metrolink commuter rail) railroad bridge, is a rodeo.
- North of the Pomona Valley Freeway (SR-60) is the confluence of the San Jose Creek and the San Gabriel River.

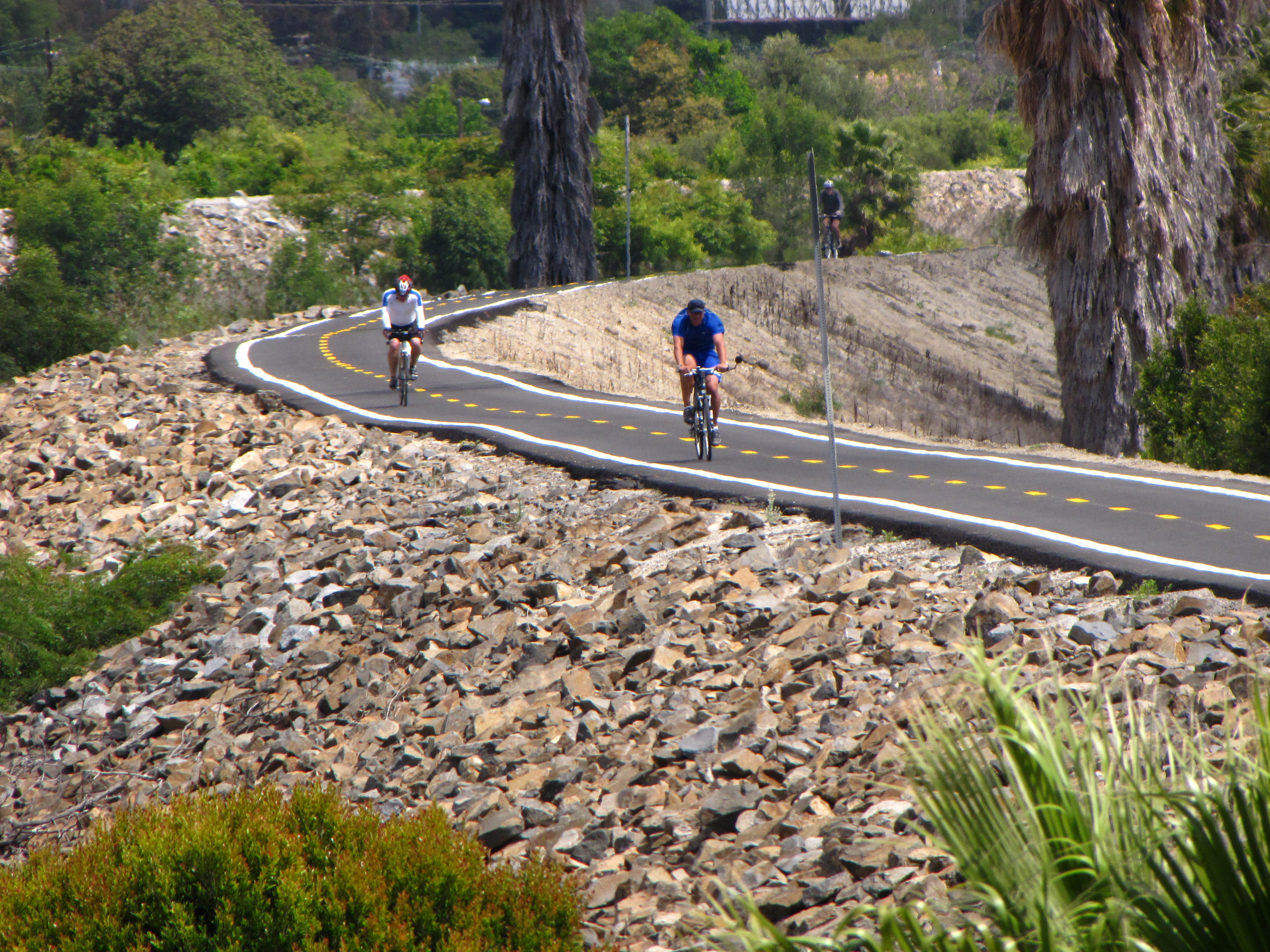
The trail along the southern segment of the San Gabriel River

== Maintenance ==
Maintained by Los Angeles County Department of Public Works Road Maintenance Division, swept on a scheduled basis. South of Wardlow, the city of Long Beach is responsible. According to LADPW, Public Works currently has two projects underway to improve the condition of the bike path between Wilderness Park and Whittier Narrows.

The San Gabriel River Bike Path Rehabilitation project involves re-paving, striping the pavement, and updating the gates on the section of path from the Whittier Narrows Dam to Florence Avenue.

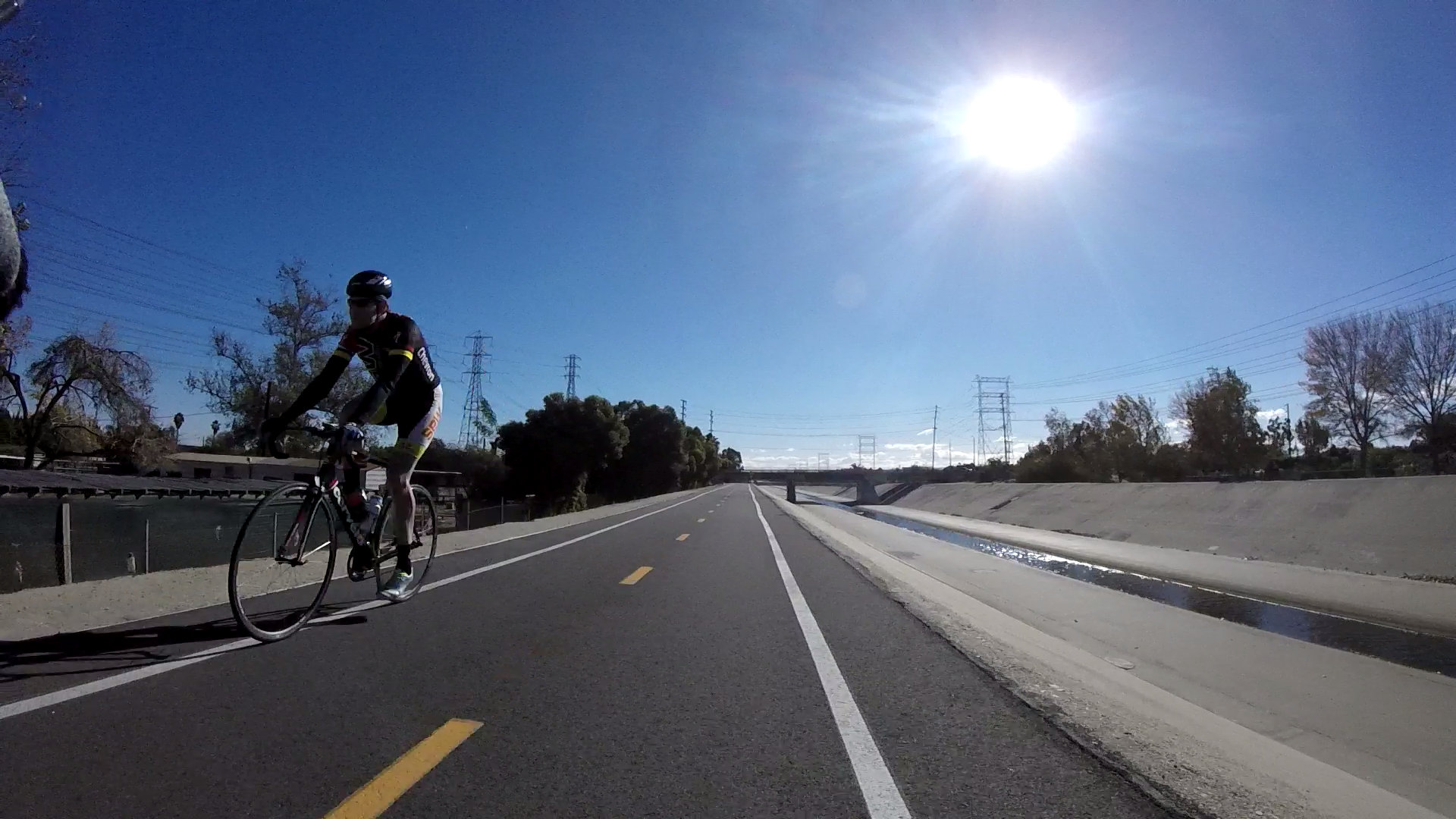
Near Rynerson Park in Lakewood

The Commuter Bikeway Signage project involves the placement of signs and pavement markings along the river bike paths including the San Gabriel River path. This project is currently in the design phase, which will include an evaluation of signage at San Gabriel River Parkway to inform bicyclists that the bike path switches from one side of the river to the other at this location.

== See also ==
- CicLAvia
- Shoreline Pedestrian Bikepath
- Los Angeles River Bikeway
- El Dorado Park Bike Path
