= California bikeway classifications =

California bikeway classifications are standards for identifying the level of travel efficiency and human protection offered by the various bike routes in the state. Traffic engineers use the designations for route planning.

Bikeway class	Photo	Common name	CalTrans definition	Further info	Examples
Class I	Coyote Creek Trail	BIKE PATH	“Bike paths should offer opportunities not provided by the road system. They can either provide a recreational opportunity, or in some instances, can serve as direct high-speed commute routes if cross flow by motor vehicles and pedestrian conflicts can be minimized. The most common applications are along rivers, ocean fronts, canals, utility right of way, abandoned railroad right of way, within school campuses, or within and between parks. Another common application of Class I facilities is to close gaps to bicycle travel caused by construction of freeways or because of the existence of natural barriers (rivers, mountains, etc.).”	“off-roadway bike paths or bike trails”	Coyote Creek Trail, Ballona Creek Bike Path
Class II	Spring Street Bike Lane	BIKE LANE	“Bike lanes are established along streets in corridors where there is significant bicycle demand, and where there are distinct needs that can be served by them... Bike lanes are intended to delineate the right of way assigned to bicyclists and motorists and to provide for more predictable movements by each.”	“on-roadway, separated (striped) bike lanes”	
Class III	The Wiggle	BIKE ROUTE	“Bike routes are shared facilities which serve either to: (a) Provide continuity to other bicycle facilities (usually Class II bikeways) or (b) Designate preferred routes through high demand corridors. Normally, bike routes are shared with motor vehicles. The use of sidewalks as Class III bikeways is strongly discouraged.“	“on-roadway, signed (but not separated) bike lanes", often in the form of a bicycle boulevard, often marked with sharrows	The Wiggle; Ellen Fletcher Bicycle Boulevard, Palo Alto
Class IV		SEPARATED BIKEWAY	“A bikeway for the exclusive use of bicycles and includes a separation required between the separated bikeway and the through vehicular traffic. The separation may include, but is not limited to, grade separation, flexible posts, inflexible posts, inflexible barriers, or on-street parking.”		Telegraph Ave., Oakland; Elenda Bikeway, Culver City; Venice Blvd., Mar Vista, Los Angeles; Canyon Crest Ave., Riverside

== See also ==
- List of cycleways
- Bicycle law in California
- United States Bicycle Route System
