= Baldwin Hills (mountain range) =

Mountain range in Los Angeles County, California, United States

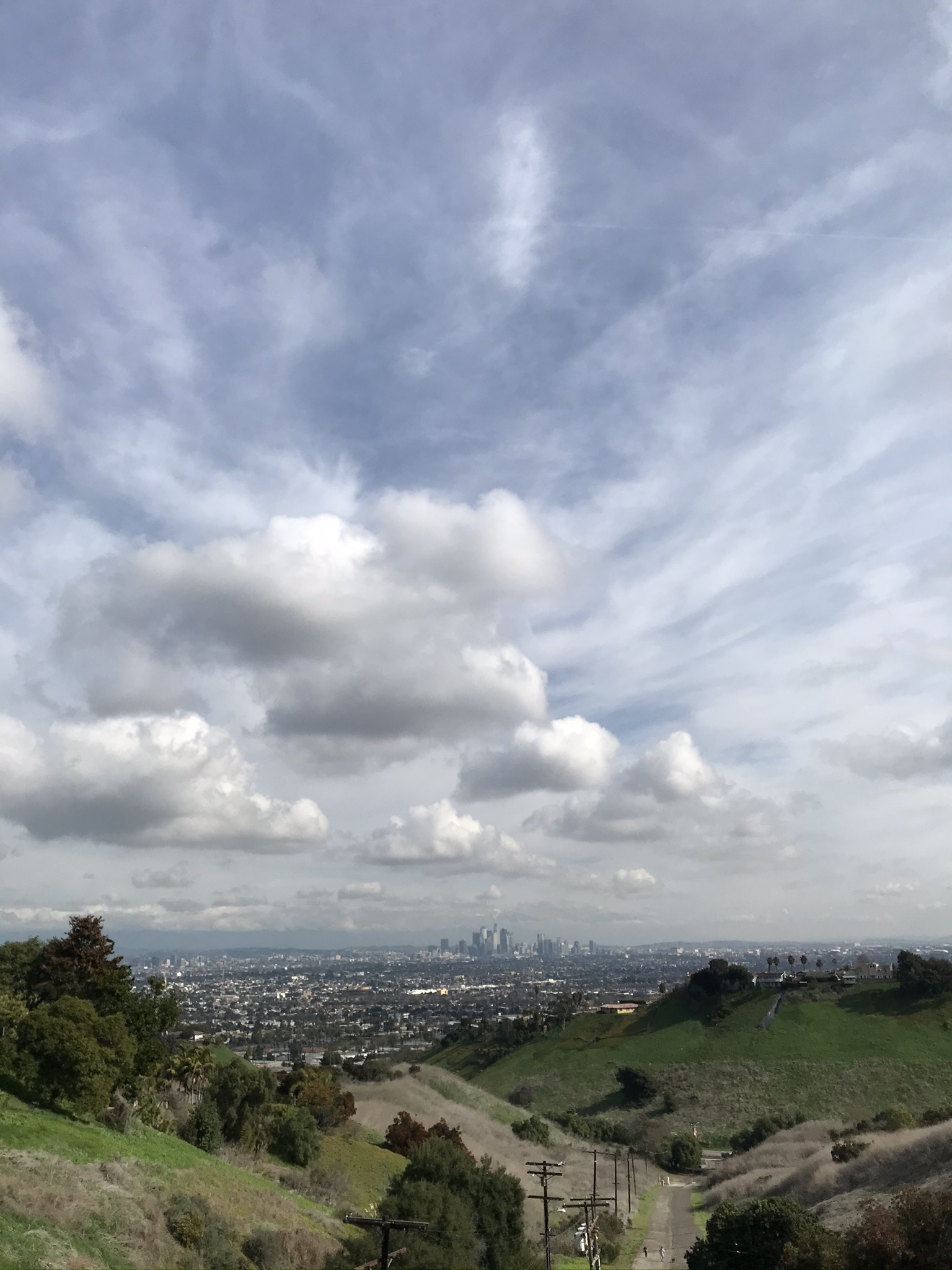
- View from Baldwin Hills

Highest point
- Elevation: 156 m (512 ft)

Geography
- Location within California Location within the United States
- Country: United States
- State: California
- District: Los Angeles County
- Range coordinates: 33°59′43″N 118°21′50″W
- Topo map: USGS Inglewood

The Baldwin Hills are a low mountain range surrounded by and rising above the Los Angeles Basin plain in central Los Angeles County, California. The Pacific Ocean is to the west, the Santa Monica Mountains to the north, Downtown Los Angeles to the northeast, and the Palos Verdes Hills to the south—with all easily viewed from the Baldwin Hills.

== Geography ==
The headwaters of the urban river known as Ballona Creek are in the Santa Monica Mountains, such as above Beverly Hills and flows along the north base of Baldwin Hills through an active geological watergap, on the way to the Pacific Ocean in Santa Monica Bay. La Cienega Boulevard goes through a pass in the ridge of the Baldwin Hills between Inglewood and Culver City, and northeast of Los Angeles International Airport. La Cienega Boulevard is a parkway road passing alongside open space of large private corporate lands with oil wells of the Inglewood Oil Field in the southern Baldwin Hills.

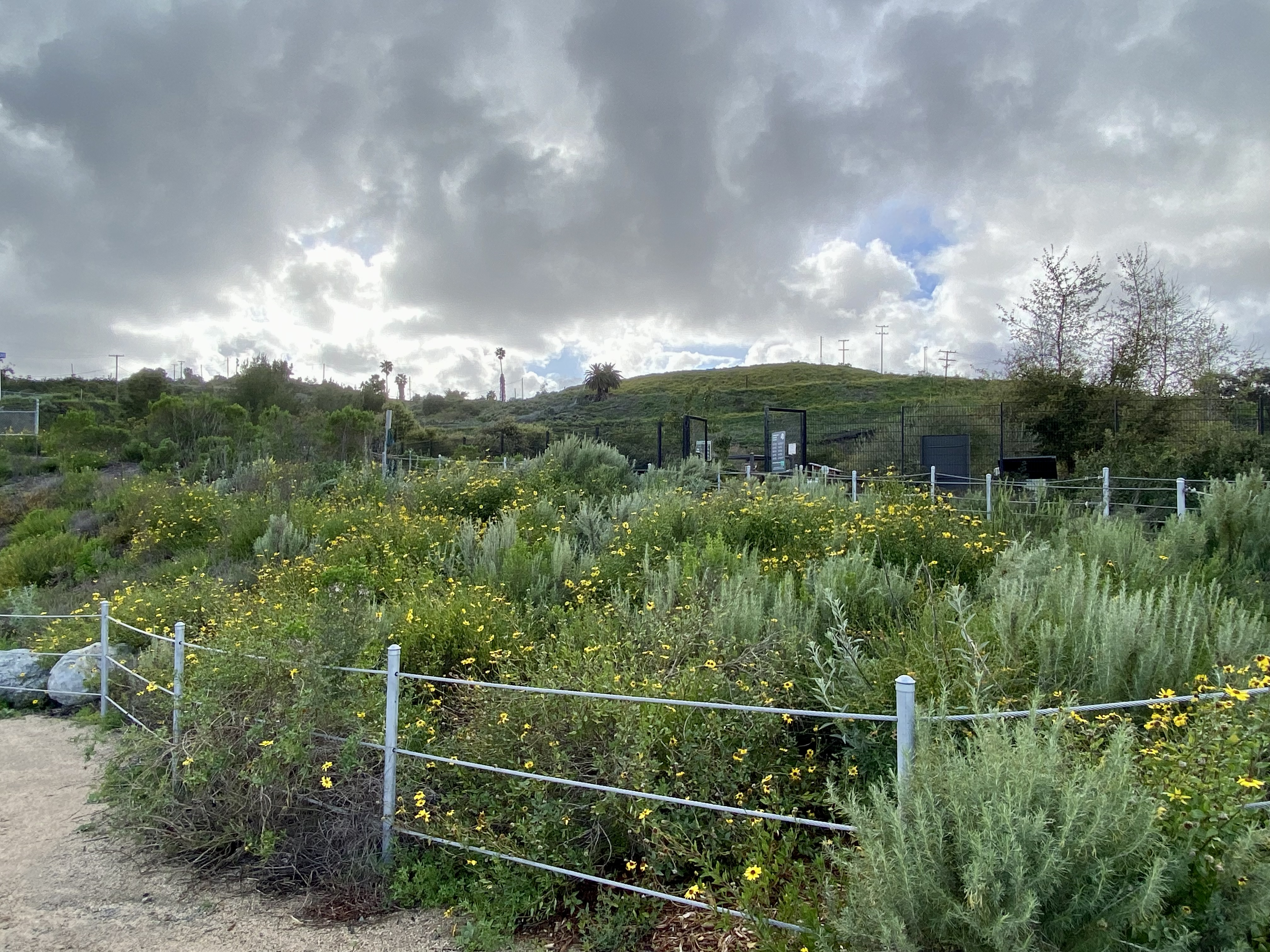
Baldwin Hills landscape from Stoneview Nature Center

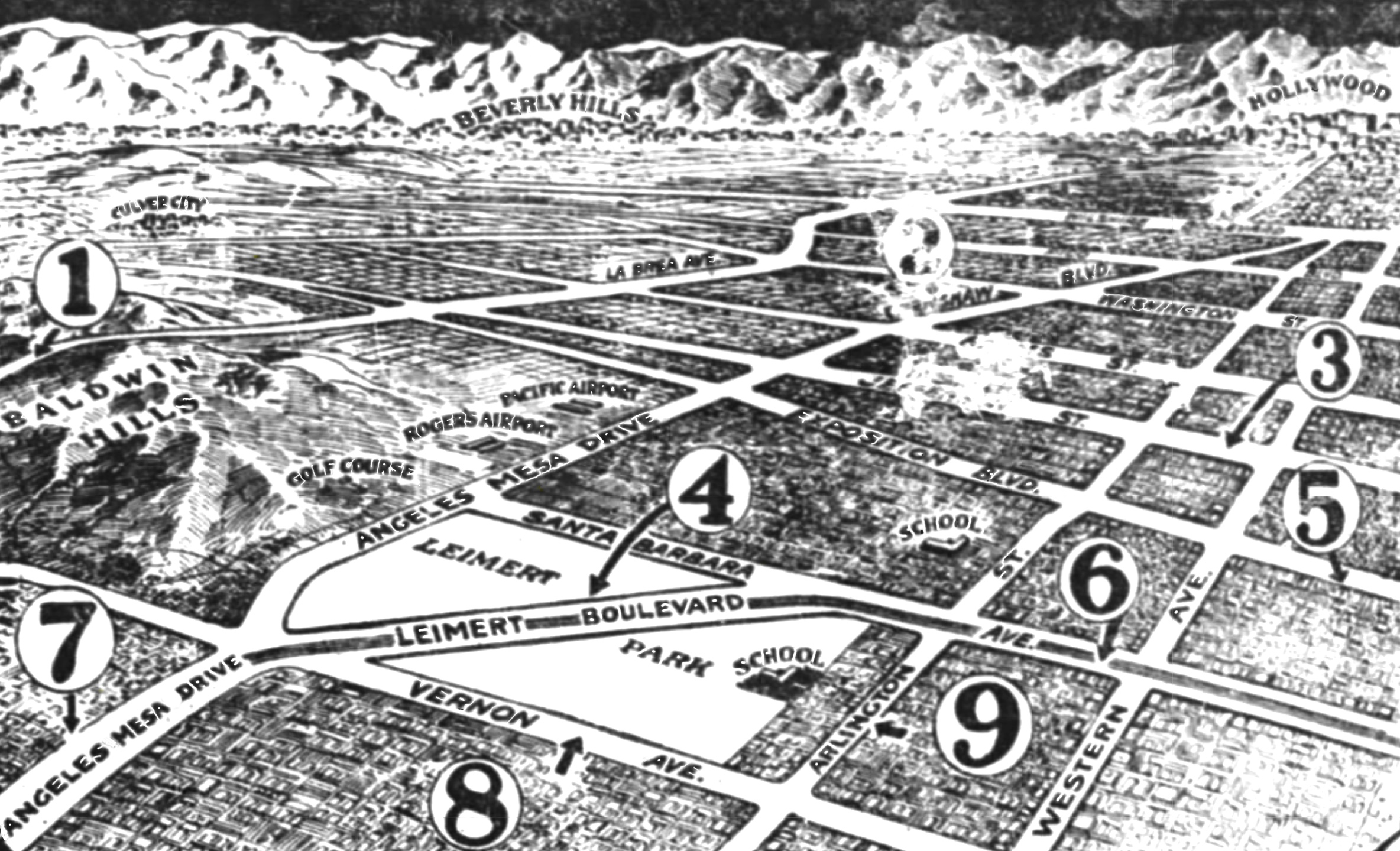
1927 Los Angeles Times map shows (1) the proposed extension of a 100-foot-wide La Brea Avenue between Jefferson Street through the Baldwin Hills toward Inglewood.

== History ==
- Rancho La Cienega o Paso de la Tijera—eastern area
- Sanchez Adobe de Rancho La Cienega o Paso de la Tijera. The adobe was once the center of the rancho. In the 1920s, an addition was built linking the structures and the building was converted into a larger clubhouse for the Sunset Golf Course.
- Rancho Rincon de los Bueyes—western area
- The hills are the location of the Baldwin Hills Dam failure and subsequent 1963 Baldwin Hills Reservoir flooding disaster.

== Recreation ==
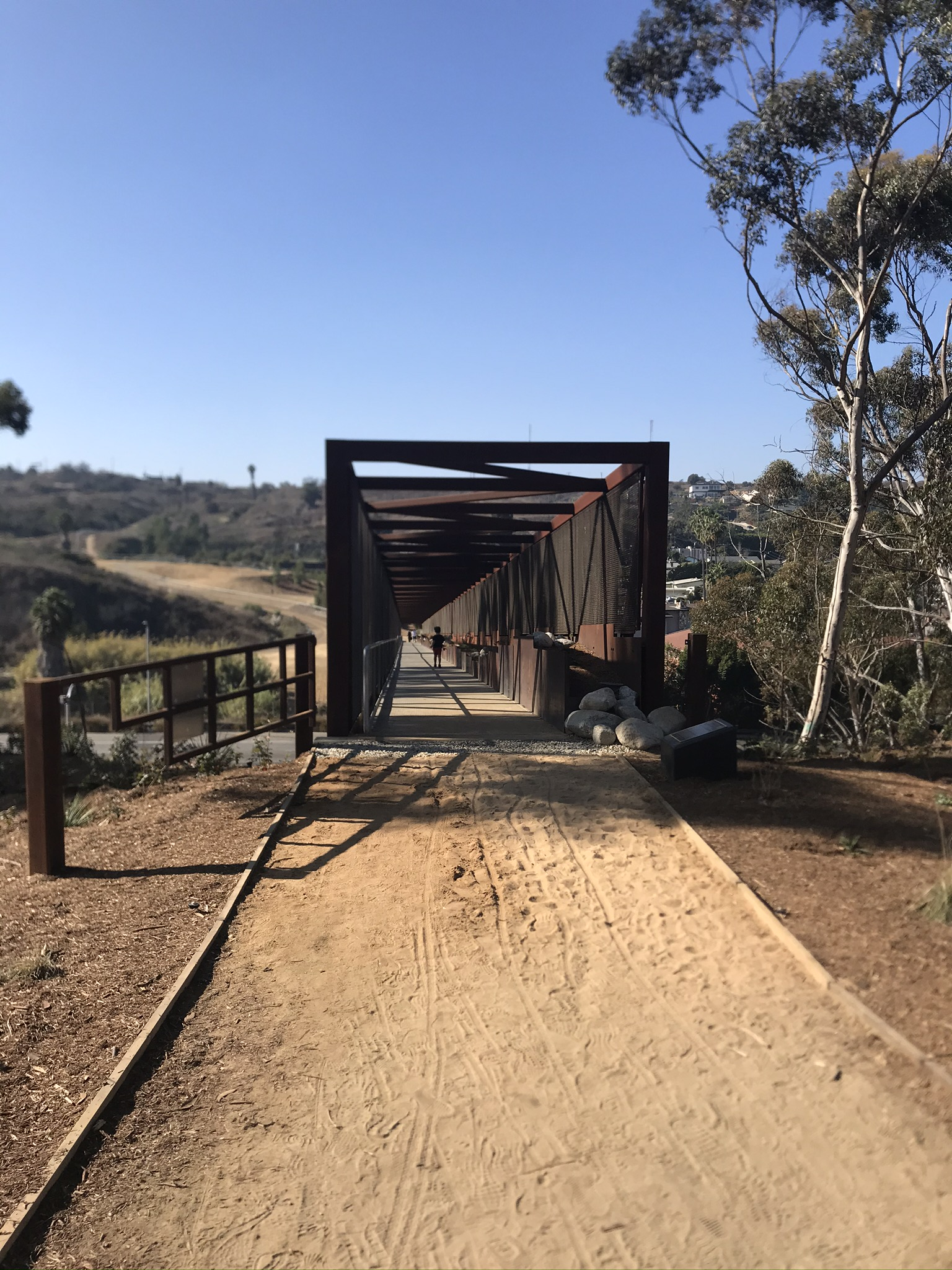
Park to Playa Trail Wildlife Crossing and Pedestrian Bridge

The Baldwin Hills Parklands are 480 acres (190 ha) of public parks managed by California State Parks, Los Angeles County Parks and Recreation, City of Los Angeles Parks and Recreation, Culver City Parks and Recreation, and the California Mountains Recreation and Conservation Authority.

- Kenneth Hahn State Recreation Area: recreation, such as walking, picnicking, and bird-watching fits in with preservation of the open-space lands and native habitats: entrance on South La Cienega Boulevard.
- Baldwin Hills Scenic Overlook Park - entrance on Jefferson Boulevard;
- Norman O Houston Park
- Jim Gilliam Recreation Center
- Park to Playa Trail
  - Stocker Corridor
  - Kenneth Hahn State Recreation Area
  - Blair Hills – Segment C
  - Baldwin Hills Scenic Overlook State Park
  - Culver City Park
  - Ballona Creek Bike Path
  - Stoneview Nature Center
  - Norman O. Houston Park
  - Reuben Ingold Park

== See also ==
- Baldwin Hills
- Blair Hills, Culver City
- Culver Crest
- Fox Hills, Culver City
- Inglewood Oil Field
- Ladera Heights
- Leimert Park
- Ranchos of California
- View Park-Windsor Hills
- Village Green
- West Los Angeles College
