= List of nature centers in California =

This is a list of nature centers and environmental education centers in the state of California.

To use the sortable tables: click on the icons at the top of each column to sort that column in alphabetical order; click again for reverse alphabetical order.

Name	Image	Location	County	Summary
Agua Hedionda Lagoon Discovery Center		Carlsbad	San Diego	Natural history, ecology and cultural history of the 400-acre lagoon and surrounding area
Alum Rock Science and Nature Center		San Jose	Santa Clara	Operated by the Youth Science Institute in 720-acre Alum Rock Park, natural history exhibits, live animals
American River Nature Center		Coloma	El Dorado	Operated by the American River Conservancy in Marshall Gold Discovery State Historic Park
Arcata Marsh Interpretive Center		Arcata	Humboldt	307 acres, marsh ecology and operations of the wastewater treatment plant
Audubon Center at Debs Park		Los Angeles	Los Angeles	Operated by Audubon California in the 282-acre municipal park, nature education programs and native plant restoration projects
Augustus F. Hawkins Natural Park		Los Angeles	Los Angeles	website, Evan Frankel Discovery Center operated by the city in the 8.5-acre park
Batiquitos Lagoon Nature Center		Carlsbad	San Diego	Operated by the Batiquitos Lagoon Foundation, programs about the 610-acre lagoon
Big Bear Discovery Center		Fawnskin	San Bernardino	Visitor center with exhibits, nature playscape, environmental education programs about the San Bernardino National Forest
Big Sur Discovery Center			Monterey	Located in 4,766-acre Andrew Molera State Park, exhibits on California condors, operated by the Ventana Wildlife Society
Borrego Desert Nature Center		Borrego Springs	San Diego	Operated by the Anza-Borrego Desert Natural History Association, education programs and store about Anza-Borrego Desert State Park
Buena Vista Audubon Nature Center		Oceanside	San Diego	website, natural history of Buena Vista Lagoon
Carolyn Parr Nature Center		Napa	Napa	website, managed by the Napa Valley Naturalists, located in Westwood Hills Park
Charmlee Wilderness Park Nature Center		Malibu	Los Angeles	website, operated by the City in the 532-acre park, displays on Chumash Indian history, the park’s history as a working ranch, geology, local flora and fauna
Chico Creek Nature Center		Chico	Butte	Located in 3,670-acre Bidwell Park, live animals, natural history exhibits, native plant garden
City of Watsonville Nature Center		Watsonville	Santa Cruz	website, operated by the City in Ramsay Park, a wetlands area
Crissy Field Center		San Francisco	San Francisco	Environmental education programs, located in the Golden Gate National Recreation Area
Crab Cove Visitor Center at Crown Memorial State Beach		Alameda	Alameda	Exhibits about the marine life environment and importance of San Francisco Bay, aquarium, local history, 2.5 mile beach
CuriOdyssey		San Mateo	San Mateo	Formerly the Coyote Point Museum, experiential science and wildlife center with many live animals, native garden
David C. Daniels Nature Center			San Mateo	website, education center for the 2,143-acre Skyline Ridge Open Space Preserve
Desert Discovery Center		Barstow	San Bernardino	Natural history of the Mojave Desert, 8 acre outdoor trail and classroom, live tortoises
Devil's Punchbowl Nature Center		Pearblossom	Los Angeles	Operated by the Los Angeles County Department of Parks and Recreation, area wildlife, plants and geology, 1,310 acres
Eaton Canyon Nature Center		Pasadena	Los Angeles	190 acres, live animals, exhibits about canyon wildlife (Destroyed during the Eaton Fire in January 2025)
Ecology Center		Berkeley	Alameda	Focus on sustainable living, features demonstration home and garden, workshops and classes
Ed Z'berg Sugar Pine Point State Park		Tahoma	El Dorado	1,000 hectares (2,500 acres) park, nature center located in the day use area by the Ehrman Mansion, displays of park birds, mammals, game fish, lake ecology, wildflowers, trees
Effie Yeaw Nature Center		Carmichael	Sacramento	website, 77 acres, live native animals, wetlands exhibit, replica Nisenan summer village, operated by the American River Natural History Association
El Dorado Nature Center		Long Beach	Los Angeles	website, 105 acres, 2 miles of trails, operated by the City
Elkhorn Slough National Estuarine Research Reserve		Watsonville	Santa Cruz	Operated by the Elkhorn Slough Foundation, about 1,700 acres, exhibits about the birds, plants, animals and marine life of the watershed.
Environmental Discovery Center at Spring Lake Regional Park		Santa Rosa	Sonoma	Operated by Sonoma County Parks, 320-acre park, hands-on exhibits about Sonoma County's plants, animals and natural resources, tide pool with live, touchable sea creatures
Environmental Nature Center		Newport Beach	Orange	website, Established 1972; 5 acres; hands-on natural science and sustainability programs, field trips, nature camps; LEED Platinum-certified building, seasonal butterfly house
Feather River Nature Center		Oroville	Butte	website, operated by the City, exhibits portraying local wildlife, basaltic boulders, paintings, native plant park along the river
Galster Wilderness Park Nature Center		Irwindale	Los Angeles	Operated by the San Gabriel Mountains Regional Conservancy, 42-acre park, environmental education programs
George F. Canyon Nature Center		Rolling Hills Estates	Los Angeles	Owned by the City and operated by the Palos Verdes Peninsula Land Conservancy, 36 acres, exhibits include butterflies, birds of the canyon, insects, plant habitats, animals and wildflowers
Hayward Shoreline Interpretive Center		Hayward	Alameda	Operated by the Hayward Area Recreation and Park District, focus is San Francisco Bay wetland and shoreline ecosystems
Humboldt Coastal Nature Center		Manila	Humboldt	website, 113 acres, operated by the Friends of the Dunes, natural history of Humboldt Bay
Idyllwild Nature Center		Idyllwild	Riverside	website, operated by Riverside County Parks in the 202-acre Idyllwild Park, exhibits and programs on mountain ecology, habitats, flora and fauna, Cahuilla Native culture and the history of the San Jacinto Mountains
Jughandle Creek Farm and Nature Center		Mendocino	Mendocino	website, 39 acres, private organization that includes a nature center, overnight lodging, native plant nursery, community gardens, forests, meadows and trails, adjacent to Jug Handle State Natural Reserve
Lindsay Wildlife Museum		Walnut Creek	Contra Costa	Natural history museum with live native animals and wildlife rehabilitation center
Living Coast Discovery Center		Chula Vista	San Diego	website, private organization located on the 316-acre Sweetwater Marsh National Wildlife Refuge, features aquariums and displays of local marine life and reptiles, a sea turtle lagoon, outdoor aviaries of rescued birds, a shark and ray exhibit, and hiking trails
The Living Desert		Palm Desert	Riverside	Botanical garden and zoo dedicated solely to the deserts of the world, 1,200 acres
Louis Robidoux Nature Center		Riverside	Riverside	website, operated by Riverside County Parks, ecology of the Jurupa Valley area, changing exhibits on Native American history, native mammals, birds and reptiles, basic astronomy, the environment
Lucy Evans Baylands Nature Interpretive Center		Palo Alto	Santa Clara	Operated by the City in the 1,940-acre Baylands Nature Preserve, 15 miles of trails
Madrona Marsh Preserve & Nature Center		Torrance	Los Angeles	Operated by the City, exhibits about the plants, birds and animals of the marsh
Mary Vagle Museum & Nature Center		Fontana	San Bernardino	website, operated by the City, exhibits of local plants, animals, geology and history
McClellan Ranch Preserve		Cupertino	Santa Clara	18-acres, includes nature museum and environmental education center
Mono Basin National Scenic Area Visitor Center		Lee Vining	Mono	Operated by Inyo National Forest, includes exhibits on Mono Lake history, wildlife, geology.
Nature Center at Avalon Canyon		Catalina Island	Los Angeles	Natural history and conservation of the island, operated by the Catalina Island Conservancy
Neal Taylor Nature Center		Santa Barbara	Santa Barbara	Hands-on discovery center focused on the natural environment, ecosystems, and cultural heritage of Cachuma Lake, the upper Santa Ynez River and San Rafael Mountain watershed
Oak Canyon Nature Center		Anaheim	Orange	58 acres, live animal and regional natural history exhibits, operated by the City
Oak Grove Nature Center		Stockton	San Joaquin	website, operated by the County in 180-acre Oak Grove Regional Park, exhibits of flora and fauna native to the Park, San Joaquin County and the San Joaquin Valley
Pismo Nature Center		Pismo Beach	San Luis Obispo	Operated by the Central Coast Natural History Association at 1,050-acre Pismo State Beach, exhibits about the park's natural history, fresh water lagoon and Chumash culture
Placer Nature Center		Auburn	Placer	website, interactive exhibits about area natural and cultural history, watershed, energy choices, replica of a Maidu summer shelter
Placerita Canyon Nature Center		Santa Clarita	Los Angeles	Located in Placerita Canyon State Park, 12 miles of trails, live animals
Ralph B. Clark Regional Park Interpretive Center		Buena Park	Orange County	Owned and operated by Orange County Parks, 104 acres at the foot of Coyote Hills, includes a nature center with a fossil collection
Rancho Del Oso Nature and History Center		Davenport	Santa Cruz	Located in the ocean end of Big Basin Redwoods State Park, interactive exhibits about the natural and cultural history of the Waddell Valley
Randall Museum		San Francisco	San Francisco	Owned and operated by the City's Recreation and Parks Department, focus is nature, science, arts and crafts, live native and domestic animals and interactive displays
Richardson Bay Audubon Center & Sanctuary		Tiburon	Marin	Operated by the National Audubon Society, 911 acres, adult and children's nature programs
Rotary Nature Center		Oakland	Alameda	website, operated by the City, interactive exhibits about Lake Merritt and Joaquin Miller Park, includes freshwater viewing ponds, five habitat islands, a geodesic dome for injured birds
Sacramento River Discovery Center		Red Bluff	Tehama	website, located in the 488-acre Red Bluff Recreation Area in Mendocino National Forest, ecosystem of the Sacramento River watershed
Sanborn Science and Nature Center		Saratoga	Santa Clara	Operated by the Youth Science Institute in 3,688-acre Sanborn Park, exhibits include animal mounts that populate the Santa Cruz Mountain Range, earthquake and geology displays, an insect zoo and an organic garden
San Dimas Canyon Nature Center		San Dimas	Los Angeles	website, 138 acres, enclosed wildlife sanctuary containing live animals indigenous to Southern California
Santa Cruz Museum of Natural History		Santa Cruz	Santa Cruz	Exhibits include natural history and geology of the Santa Cruz Region, Ohlone culture, marine life of the Monterey Bay, nature programs
Santa Fe Dam Nature Center		Irwindale	Los Angeles	Operated by the San Gabriel Mountains Regional Conservancy, exhibits on the plant life and wildlife of the alluvial fan of the San Gabriel River, 70 acre lake
Santa Rosa Plateau Ecological Reserve		Idyllwild	Riverside	Operated by Riverside County Parks, 9,000-acre reserve, visitor center exhibits and interpretive programs
Shipley Nature Center		Huntington Beach	Orange	website, 18 acres, located within Huntington Beach Central Park, owned by the City, area natural and cultural history, native plants
Shorebird Park Nature Center		Berkeley	Alameda	website, operated by the City in a strawbale building, focus is marine life, conservation and education, 6 acres
Sooky Goldman Nature Center		Beverly Hills	Los Angeles	Located in 605-acre Franklin Canyon Park, exhibits and programs about the park's natural and cultural history
STAR Eco Station		Culver City	Los Angeles	website, environmental science museum, exotic wildlife rescue center and haven for endangered and illegally trafficked exotic animals
Stoneview Nature Center		Culver City	Los Angeles	Managed by the Los Angeles County Department of Parks and Recreation; part of the Park to Playa Trail
Sulphur Creek Nature Center		Hayward	Alameda	Managed by the Hayward Area Recreation and Park District, wildlife education and rehabilitation facility, live native animals
Tilden Regional Park		Berkeley	Alameda	2,079-acre park, includes the Tilden Nature Area Environmental Education Center
Topanga Nature Center		Topanga	Los Angeles	Located in 11,000-acre Topanga State Park, exhibits about the flora, fauna and geography of the area
Tucker Wildlife Sanctuary		Modjeska Canyon	Orange	Owned and operated by California State University, Fullerton, includes a natural history museum and interpretive center, two ponds, bird observation porch and feeders, hiking trails, gift shop
Turtle Bay Exploration Park		Redding	Shasta	300 acres, includes the McConnell Arboretum & Botanical Gardens, Turtle Bay Museum and Paul Bunyan's Forest Camp
Vasona Science and Nature Center		Los Gatos	Santa Clara	Youth science and nature education facility operated by the Youth Science Institute in the 150-acre Vasona Park
White Point Nature Education Center		San Pedro	Los Angeles	Operated by the Palos Verdes Peninsula Land Conservancy, 102 acres, hiking and handicap accessible trails overlooking the ocean and Catalina Island
Whittier Narrows Nature Center		South El Monte	Los Angeles	Operated by the County, exhibits about the plants and animals of the river environment, includes live displays, 400 acres
Wilderness Park Nature Center		Arcadia	Los Angeles	website, operated by the City, features live animals on display and a pond
Yosemite National Park - Nature Center at Happy Isles		Yosemite Valley	Mariposa	Open from May-Sep, located at the Happy Isles bus stop

== Resources ==
- California Association for Environmental and Outdoor Education
