= List of municipal parks in Culver City =

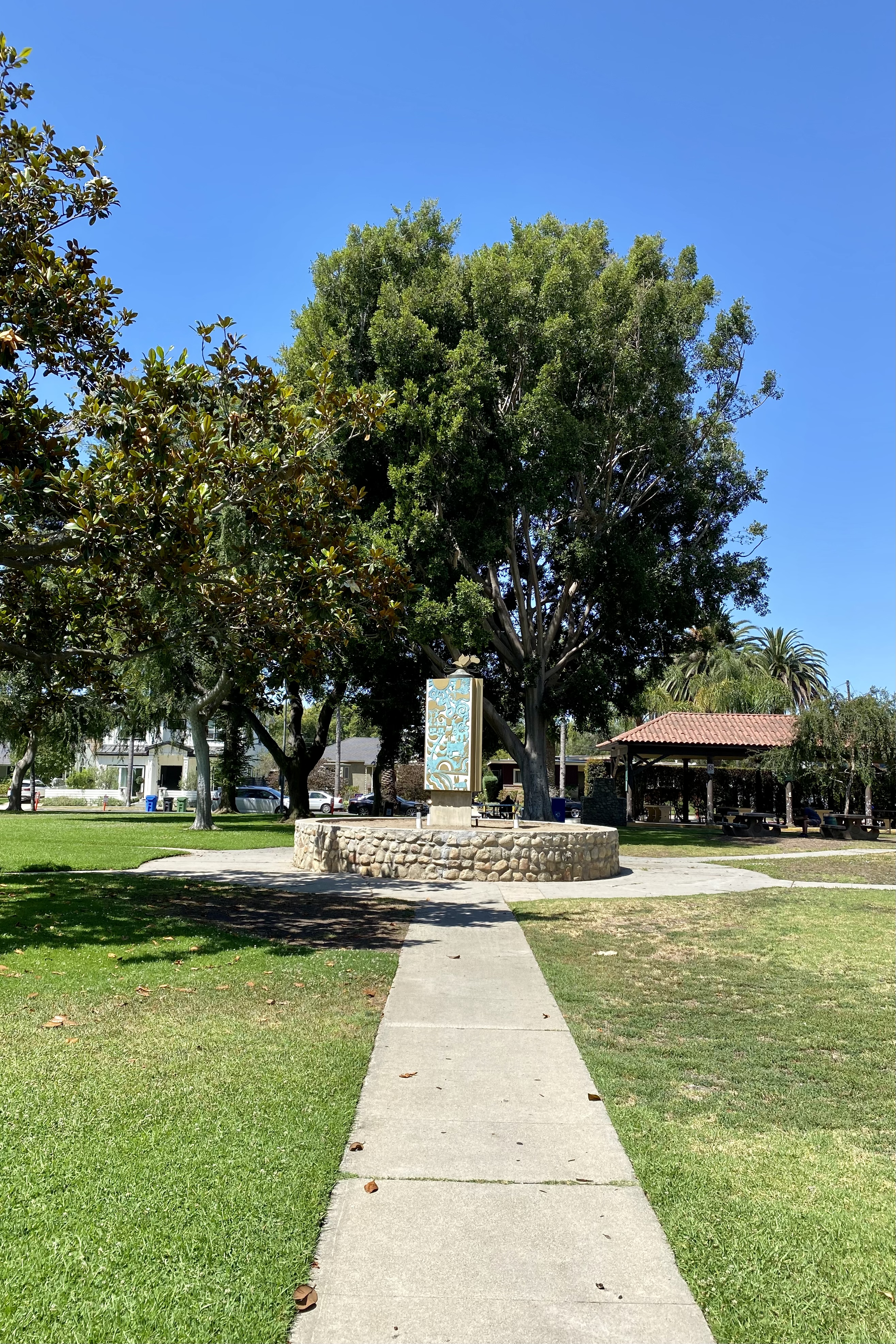
Carlson Park, Culver City, Los Angeles County, California.

This is a list of Culver City municipal parks. Culver City is an incorporated city in western Los Angeles County, California. The city operates 14 parks within city limits.

== List of parks ==
1. Blair Hills Park
2. Carlson Park - originally Victory Park, renamed in honor of Dr. Paul Carlson; in the 1920s, Barney Oldfield Speedway was located just south of this park
3. Culver City Park - connection from Ballona Creek to Park to Playa Trail, Little League fields, dog park, skate park; according to the Los Angeles County Historical Directory (1988), the top of Culver City Park was "Lookout Point for the Gabrielino Indians."
4. Culver West Alexander Park - footpath access to Del Rey neighborhood
5. El Marino Park, Sunkist Park neighborhood - ceramics studio with kiln
6. Fox Hills Park, Fox Hills neighborhood
7. Lindberg Park - “Stone House” community events and cooperative preschool
8. Syd Kronenthal Park - formerly called McManus Park, starting point of Ballona Creek Bike Path
9. Tellefson Park
10. Veterans Memorial Park - auditorium and meeting spaces, municipal pool; adjacent to senior center, teen center and Wende Museum.

== Pocket parks ==
Pocket parks in Culver City are:

- Coombs Parkette
- Fox Hills Parkette

== Shared spaces ==
Parks operated as shared space with CCUSD elementary schools, and thus with restricted access hours for the public:

- Outdoor Play Area at Linwood Howe Elementary
- Blanco Park at El Rincon Elementary

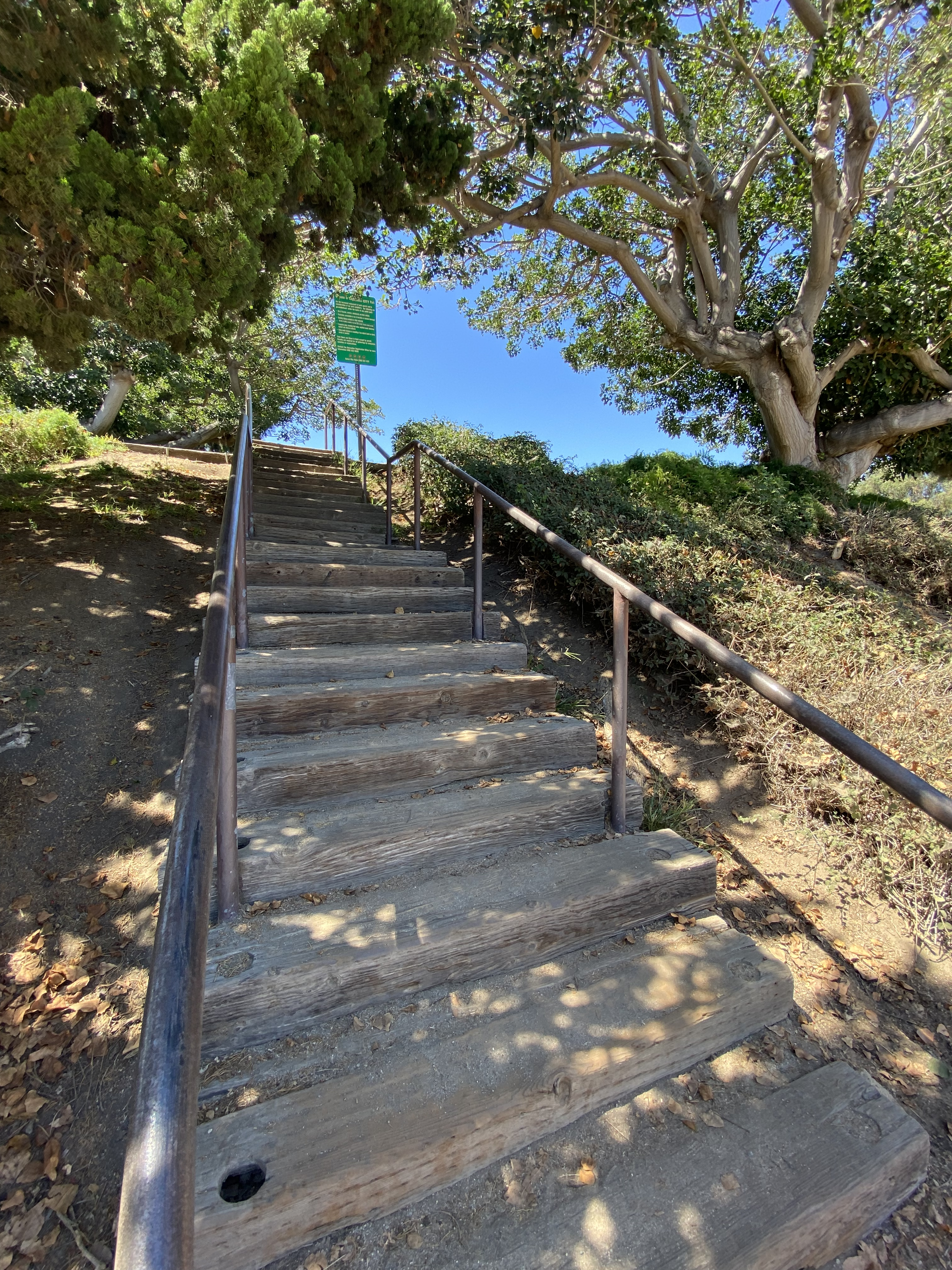
The .5 mi (0.80 km) loop at Fox Hills Park is a popular workout spot.

== See also ==
- List of parks in Los Angeles County, California
- Culver Boulevard Median Bike Path
- Stoneview Nature Center
