= Ballona Creek Bike Path =

Cycling route in Los Angeles County, California

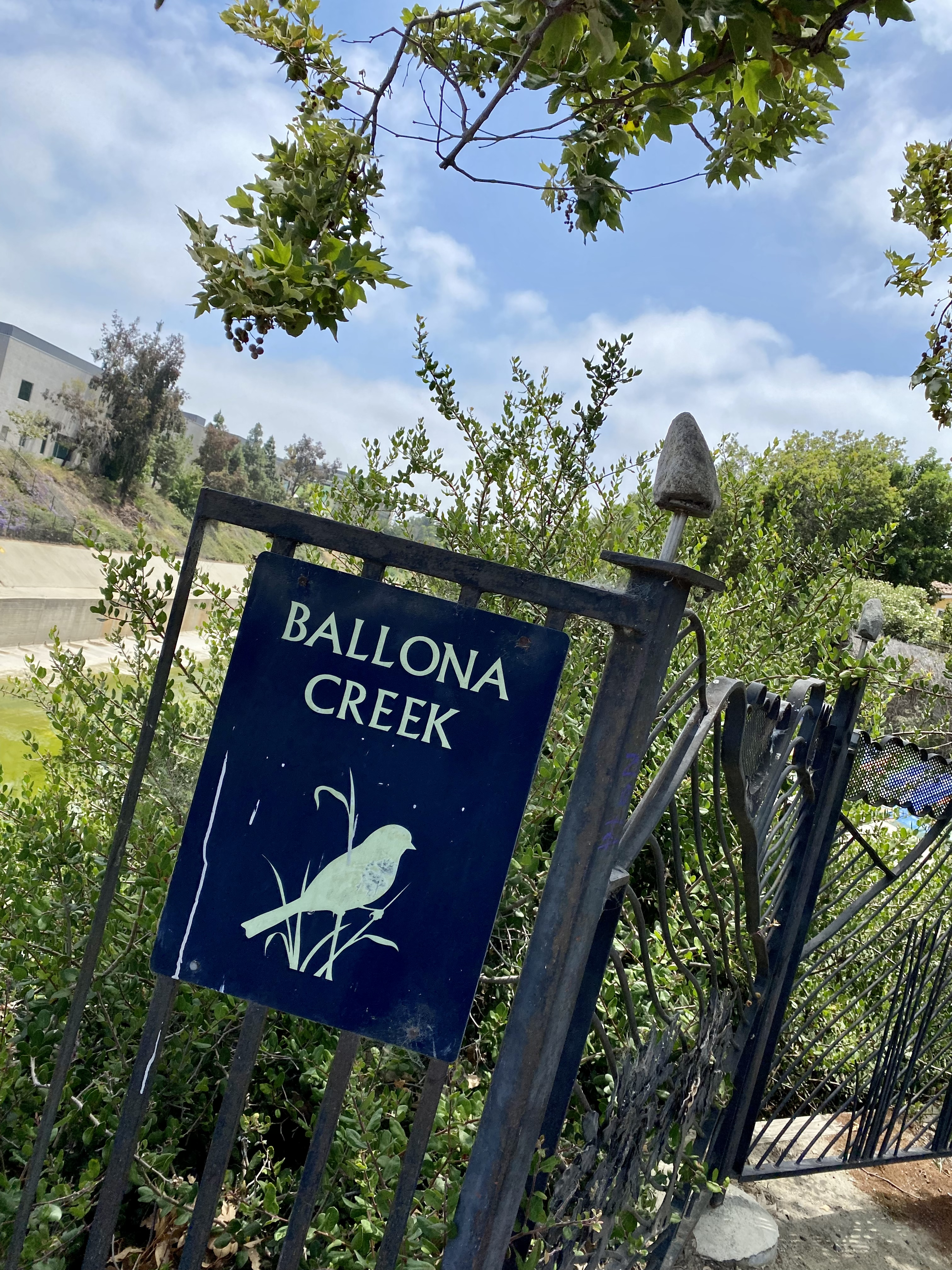
- Creek signage
- Length: 6.7 mi (10.8 km)
- Location: Los Angeles County, California, United States
- Established: 1970
- Completed: 1980
- Trailheads: Bike Lane Bridge, Pacific Ave. Bridge
- Use: Commute, recreation
- Grade: Max. 6%
- Difficulty: Easy to moderate
- Surface: Concrete, asphalt
- Maintainer: LACDPW
- Website: trails.lacounty.gov

The Ballona Creek Bike Path (pronunciation: “Bah-yo-nuh" or “Buy-yo-nah”) is a 6.7-mile (10.8 km) Class I bicycle path and pedestrian route in California. The bike path follows the north bank of Ballona Creek until it reaches Santa Monica Bay at the Pacific Ocean. The route is defined by, and recognized for, the dramatic contrast between the channelized waterway's stark cement geometry and the abundant wildlife of the verdant Ballona Wetlands.

== Route ==
Ballona Creek Bike Path is one of several southern California bike routes (including the Rio Hondo Bike Path and the Santa Ana River Trail) that are immediately adjacent to local watercourses.

The creeks and rivers were turned into unsightly flood control channels in the second quarter of the 20th century, and what were originally L.A. County Public Works Department maintenance roads are now bike paths.

“More than 200 miles (320 km) of bike paths follow our waterways: the rivers, creeks, dry washes, aqueducts, reservoirs, lakes, and oceans…Cyclists who follow these bikeways will discover a different Los Angeles, full of hidden beauty and unexpected delights,” wrote L.A. Bike Rides author Loren MacArthur in 1985.

The Ballona Creek Bike Path provides a route for cyclists and pedestrians between the coast and inland areas, including Baldwin Hills and LAX International Airport. The eastern segment of the route is considered less scenic but remains popular with bicycle commuters and local residents. The Ballona path is also one segment of a strenuous but feasible 72-mile (116 km) “Tour de Los Angeles” loop route around the Los Angeles Basin using the Coastal Bike Trail and the Los Angeles River Bike Path.

Although the Ballona Creek channel first surfaces in the Mid-City neighborhood of Los Angeles at the intersection of Cochran Avenue and Venice Boulevard, the bicycle and pedestrian access begins 2 miles (3.2 km) west, next to a stand of blue-gum eucalyptus trees at the back of a municipal park sports field in Culver City. (Transit riders can readily access this entrance from either the La Cienega/Jefferson or Culver City stations of the Metro’s E Line.)

The bicycle path passes just south of the Baldwin Hills parklands (accessible via the Park to Playa Trail), winds east through Culver City and the Del Rey neighborhood, and ends between Ballona Wetlands and the Marina del Rey sailboat harbor, where "there are unique views of the Westwood and Century City skyscrapers from the levee, as well as a peek into the [portion of the] Ballona Wetlands to the south."

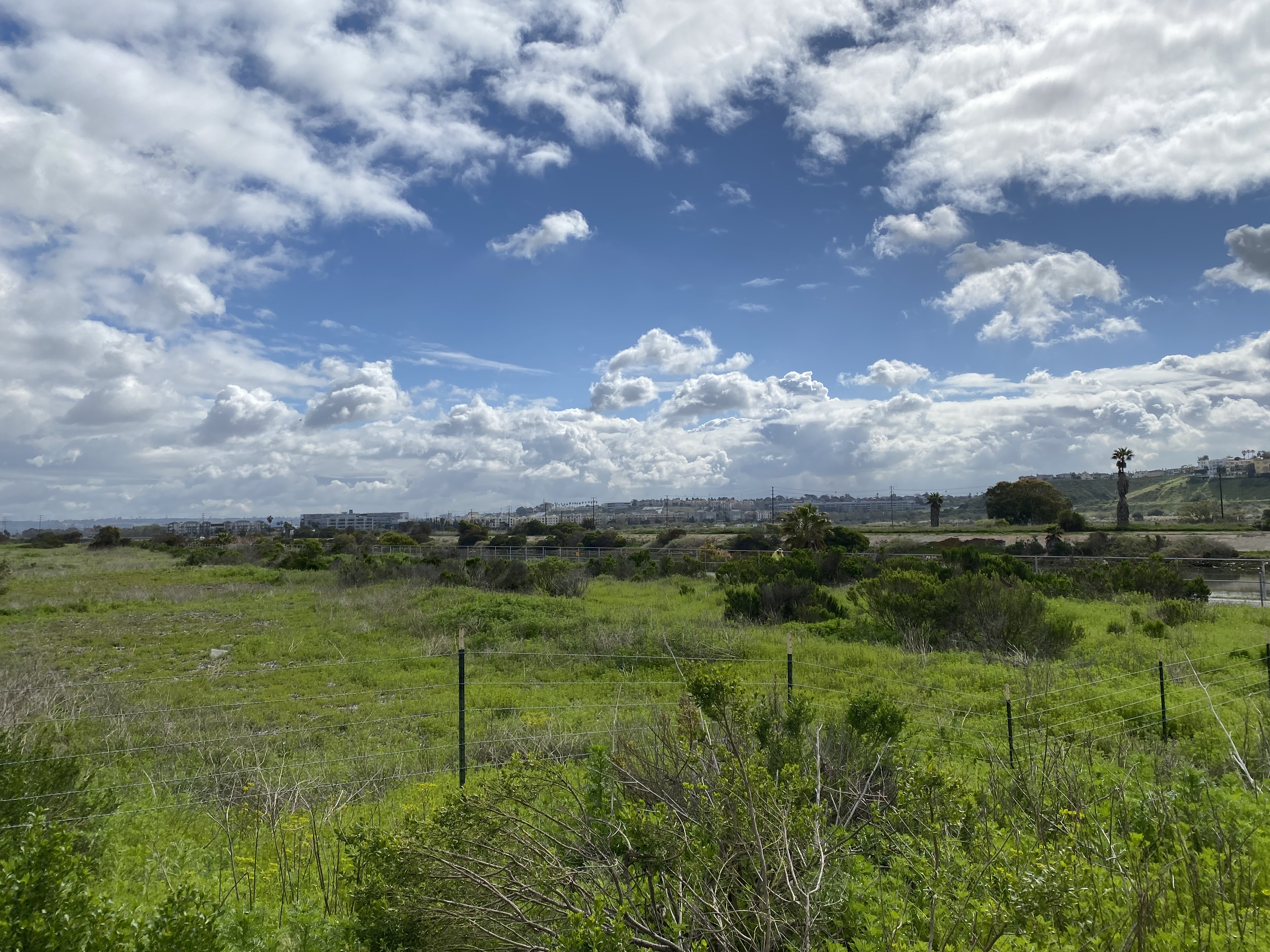
Ballona Creek Bike Path from Area A of the Ballona Wetlands

At Marina del Rey, the Ballona Creek Bike Path intersects with the 22.3-mile (35.9 km) waterfront Marvin Braude Bike Trail that runs alongside the Pacific Ocean from Pacific Palisades to Torrance.

The "beautiful floodplain" that is the Ballona Wetlands Ecological Reserve has been described as an “idyllic treasure.” Visitors to the wetlands “can see a few different varieties of hummingbirds, swallows, warblers, flycatchers, finches, and sparrows, and a huge assortment of shorebirds.” The authors of a book about biodiversity within heavily urbanized Los Angeles note that Ballona Creek Bike Path users “might spot California sea lions in the creek.”

Ballona Creek Bike Path was the number-one location for bicycle use out of 63 locations surveyed for the most recent “LADOT Walk & Bike Count.” The Los Angeles Department of Transportation (LADOT) documented a rate of approximately 400 users per hour along Ballona Creek Bike Path on a weekend day. Approximately three million Angelenos live within three miles (5 km) of the route.

"You go from a graffiti-clogged, post-apocalyptic landscape to a wide-open, yacht-filled marina in only seven miles. The air gets saltier; the birds get bigger. Land turns from grey to green, water from green to blue."

— L.A. Weekly on the allure of the Ballona Creek Bike Path

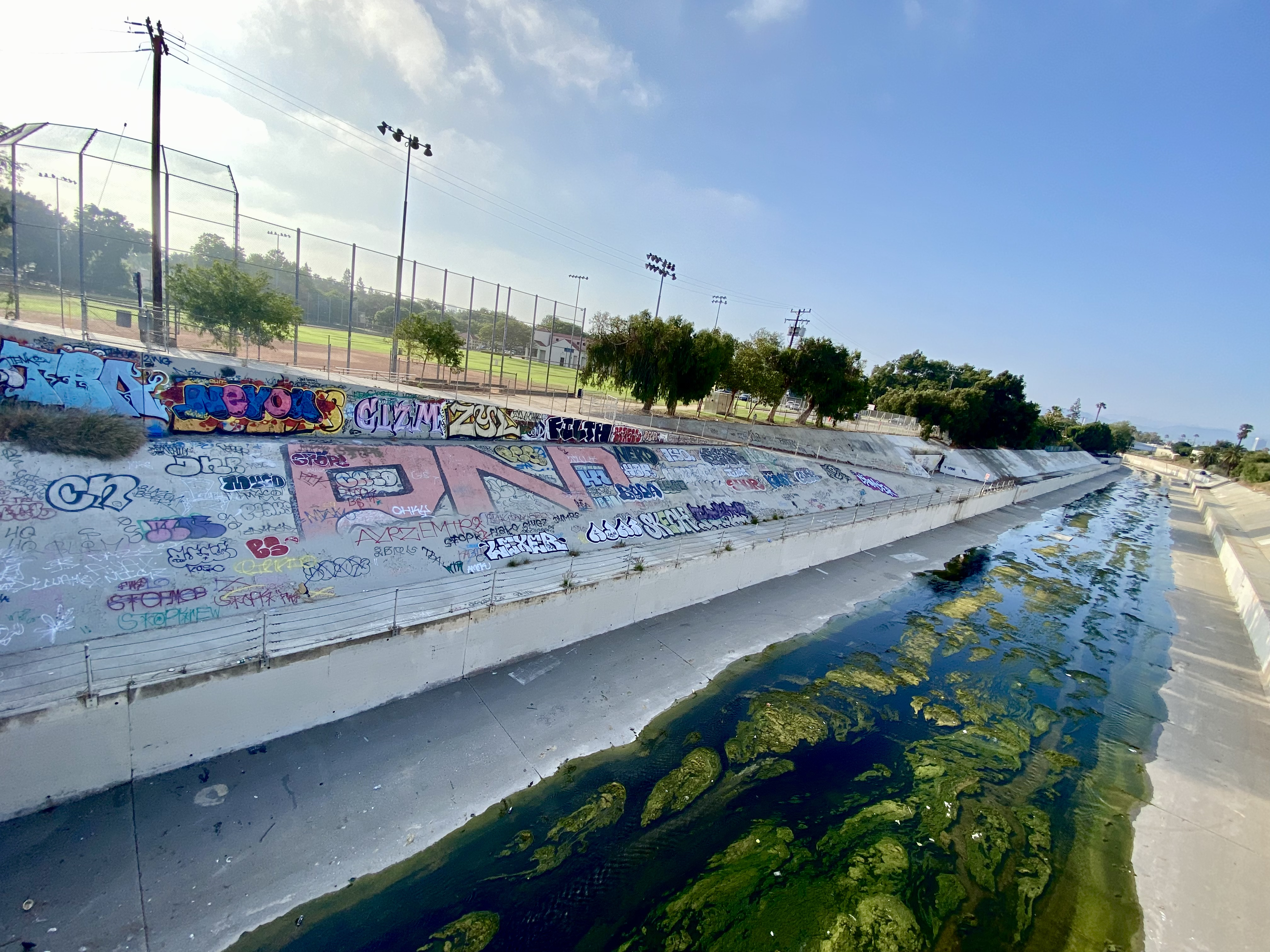
View of eastern terminus from Bike Path Bridge

=== Airport ===
People who would like to bicycle to Los Angeles International Airport can use Ballona Creek Bike Path.

For a relatively flat route, cross Pacific Avenue Bridge at trail's end and take Pacific to Vista Del Mar (the beachfront boulevard between the demolished Surfridge development and the ocean), turn left at Imperial Highway, left again Pershing Avenue, and right at Winchester Parkway. The entrance to LAX is just south of the intersection of Winchester Parkway and Sepulveda Boulevard.

Those amenable to a hill climb can exit Ballona Creek Bike Path from the Sawtelle Boulevard gate and head south, turn right at McDonald Street, left at Mesmer Avenue, which crosses Jefferson Boulevard and then continues to a Y-shaped intersection with Centinela Avenue. Two streetlights further south is Sepulveda, which offers a bike lane, a marked elevation rise up the Westchester Bluffs and a straightforward route to the entrance of LAX. A similar route with less car traffic is available by connecting with Playa Vista’s Bluff Creek trail up into the residential area of Westchester and thence to LAX.

== Conditions ==
The path is completely separate from car traffic, with “rapid-fire ups and downs at the street underpasses” on what is otherwise “a very flat route.”

The bicycle route is “marked by an aesthetic of human-dwarfing concrete” (elsewhere described as “long stretches of wall-to-wall cement landscape”) and is thus paved, variously, with concrete or asphalt.

Pedestrian paths alongside the Culver Unified campus, Mar Vista Gardens, and Milton Street Park are made of decomposed granite. (An ad-hoc pedestrian trail between the bike path and the Ballona Wetlands Ecological Preserve is bare soil.)

“Riders may experience slightly poor and bumpy road conditions” along the eastern end of the path.

Overgrown bougainvillea and untrimmed trees occasionally encroach on the path. A handful of minor storm-drain outlets flow into the creek across the bike path rather than under it, “leaking yellow-green across the street.”

Cyclists heading west in the afternoon may encounter headwinds. Due to the winds, the jetty between Fiji Way and Pacific Avenue Bridge is “a bear of a segment in the late afternoon.”

Coastal fog (“the marine layer”) may inhibit visibility, especially closer to the ocean in the morning and late afternoon.

Night lighting of the path is incidental or non-existent, however, “Increased lighting desired by some bike commuters would constitute light pollution for [Ballona wildlife] habitats.” One guidebook states explicitly, “This is definitely not a bike path to ride after nightfall.”

Per the “Ballona Creek Trail and Bikeway Environmental and Recreational Enhancement Study” produced in 2003 by the Baldwin Hills Conservancy and Loyola Marymount University, “LAPD reports only minimal problems with criminal activities within the study area. The main public safety concerns of the CCPD are graffiti and transients setting up encampments along the Creek.” A 1987 bicycle-touring guidebook advised, “Be wary and also bring a bike partner, as there have been reports of harassment and assault on some isolated creek stretches.” A guide to road cycling in Los Angeles published in 2007 advised, “Riders have experienced fewer problems closer to the beach.”

“The scenery along these river trails changes drastically by season. After the rains, the uncemented sections of the rivers flow full…flooding the bottom lands with sparkling lakes. During the dry season the water disappears; dry washes of cracked mud and gritty sand lined with drooping, dusty bushes are the only indication that water ran here just a few months ago…”

— Loren MacArthur, L.A. Bike Rides (1985)

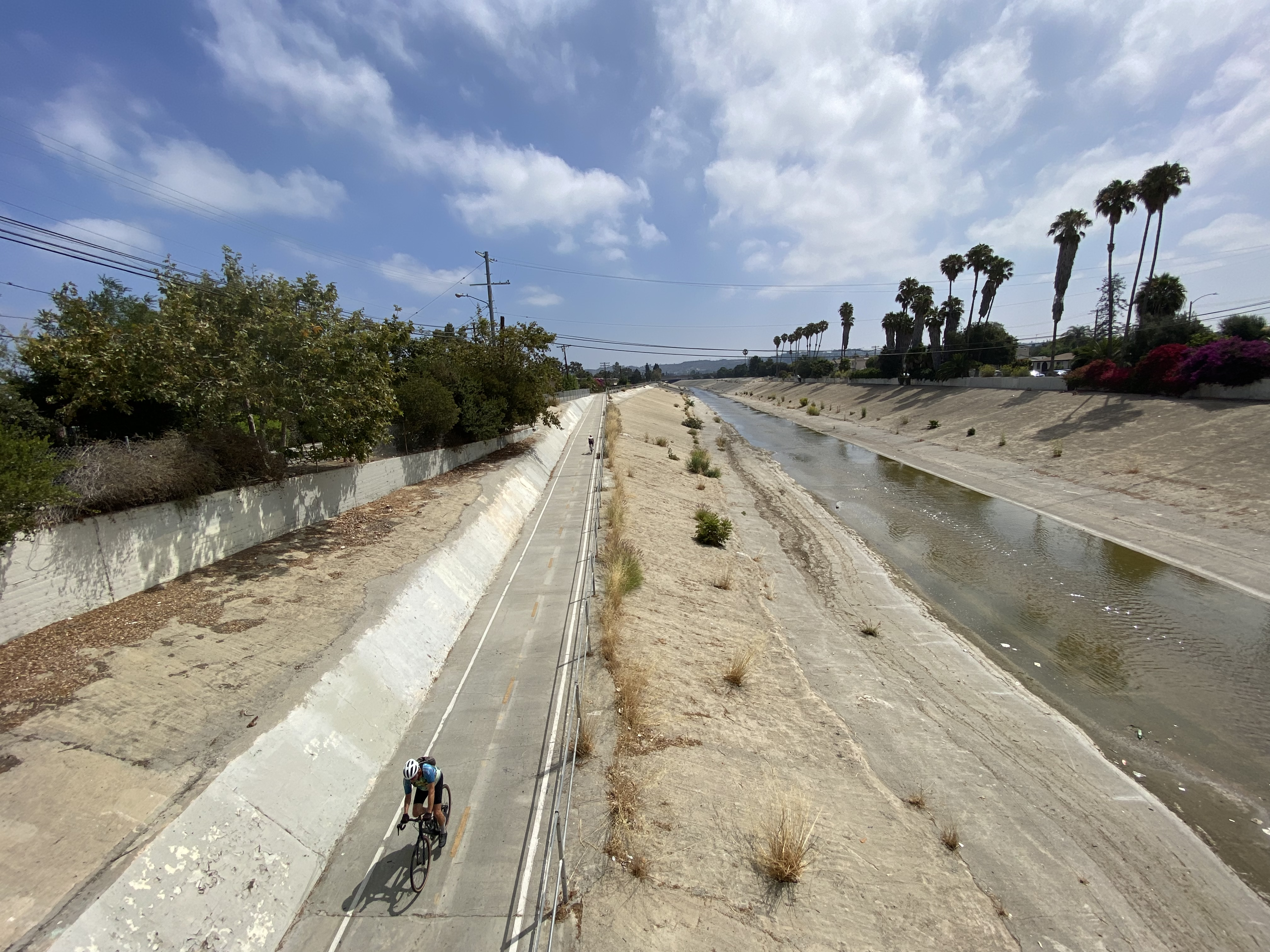
Native plantings, cyclist using bike path, Ballona Creek, palm trees

=== Rest stops ===
Facilities including bathrooms and drinking fountains can be found at nearby municipal parks including Syd Kronenthal Park and Culver-Slauson Park.

Two other parks adjacent to creek, the Milton Street Park and Area A of the Ballona Wetlands offer benches, trash cans and bike racks, but no water or rest rooms.

=== Homeless camping ===
There have been an increasing number of fires started at homeless encampments along the creek. There have been cases of "siphoning electricity from nearby power boxes", which poses a number of hazards.

== Access gates ==
Ballona Creek Bike Path can be accessed from several streets adjacent to the trail.

All Ballona Creek Bike Path gates are locked during significant rainstorms due to the risk of low-lying areas of the route being flooded and the dangers of fast-rushing water and debris.

All gates are on the north bank of the creek unless otherwise specified.

Access gates
| Gates (listed east to west) | Image | Description | Coordinates |
|---|---|---|---|
| National Boulevard gate | | Connection to Expo Bike Path at the end of Bike Path Bridge; located just steps up the ramp from the McManus gate. Expo Bike Path connects directly to downtown Culver City, as well USC at its eastern extent and downtown Santa Monica at its far western reach. | 34.0270144°N 118.3769171°W |
| McManus Avenue gate | | Located at the back of Syd Kronenthal Park (3459 McManus Ave.); also accessible from Fay Avenue, Roberts Avenue and Reid Avenue); from here, go up the ramp for Ex Line Bikeway, go down the ramp for Ballona Creek Bike Path. | 34.0272953°N 118.3767850°W |
| Higuera Street gate | | New entrance opened 2023 in conjunction with replacement of adjacent bridge. | 34.022°N 118.379°W |
| Duquesne Avenue gate | | Path connects here to the Baldwin Hills parklands across Jefferson Boulevard at Culver City Park via the larger Park to Playa Trail. | 34.0174041°N 118.3894940°W |
| Jackson Avenue gate | | OPEN as of 2022-08-11. | 34.0122925°N 118.3920904°W |
| Overland Avenue gates | | | 34.0074525°N 118.3961703°W (east gate); 34.0072104°N 118.3969602°W (west gate) |
| Elenda Street gate (north bank) | | Opens to a Culver City Unified School District campus parking lot (4601 Elenda St.); heading north, Elenda Street Bikeway connects to the Culver Boulevard Median Bike Path and then via protected two-way bike route to Washington Boulevard.; Elenda and Ocean connect via the Ballona Creek Pedestrian Bridge crossing | 34.0058535°N 118.3991660°W |
| Ocean Drive gate (south bank) | | Located at the corner of Ocean Drive and Westwood Boulevard, a block east of Culver City's Lindberg Park; entry point to Ballona Creek Pedestrian Bridge. Elenda and Ocean connect via the Ballona Creek Pedestrian Bridge crossing | 34.0055105°N 118.3984002°W |
| Sepulveda Boulevard gates | | | 34.0001117°N 118.4013477°W (east gate); 33.9997478°N 118.4015830°W (west gate) |
| Beloit Avenue gate | | Locked - Department of Public Works stormwater monitoring station; this gate was accessible to the public circa 1985. | 33.9983850°N 118.4023907°W |
| Sawtelle Boulevard gate | | Located a block west of Sawtelle at corner of Culver Drive & Purdue Avenue; sometimes called the Purdue Avenue gate. | 33.9956851°N 118.4039484°W |
| Slauson Avenue gates | | A steep ramp directly to Slauson Avenue, and an adjacent gate passing through Culver-Slauson Park (5072 S. Slauson Ave.) with narrow outlets to Slauson and Berryman Avenues | 33.9939436°N 118.4057656°W (park); 33.9933779°N 118.4064204°W (garden) |
| Inglewood Boulevard gate | | East-side access only, adjacent to Mar Vista Gardens | 33.9901936°N 118.4117325°W |
| Marshall Drive gate | | Located near the intersection of Culver Drive and Marshall Drive; Ballona Creek Renaissance considers this the east Centinela gate | 33.9878553°N 118.4148822°W |
| Centinela Avenue gate | | West side access only | 33.9869589°N 118.4161310°W |
| Milton Street gate | | Two adjacent entry points through Milton Street Park, with steep stairs for pedestrians and a zigzag ramp for bikes and wheelchair users; daytime access only. | 33.9852734°N 118.4186201°W |
| McConnell Avenue gate | | Accessible from Braddock Drive or Culver Boulevard. | 33.9821085°N 118.4227835°W |
| Lincoln Boulevard gates | | Access on both east and west sides of California State Route 1. “Access [to bike path] at Lincoln Blvd. is dangerous...Culver, Jefferson and Lincoln Boulevards are used by bicycles even though the conditions are challenging.” | 33.9755663°N 118.4324060°W (east gate); 33.9753755°N 118.4327771°W (west gate) |
| Area A of the Ballona Wetlands Ecological Reserve | | Accessible from the bike path for limited hours four days a week. Bicycles are not permitted into the reserve. (Bike parking is available next to the Area A gate.) | 33.9689043°N 118.4442033°W |
| Fuji Way gate | | Connects to the Beach Bike Path, formally known as the Marvin Braude Bike Trail. | 33.9687221°N 118.4444662°W |
| Pacific Avenue Bridge | | Western terminus where Ballona Creek runs into the Pacific Ocean, is technically part of the Coastal Bike Trail (Marvin Braude Bike Trail) that runs along the oceanfront. | 33.9627081°N 118.4532541°W |

== History ==
La Ballona was channelized and the banks cemented by the U.S. Army Corps of Engineers beginning in 1935, in order to prevent flooding and allow more extensive development of the surrounding land.

A December 1969 Los Angeles Times report about plans for the bike path was headlined: “Culver City seeks outside funds; Commission to authorize study of La Ballona Creek bike trail”; the article noted the need for safety fencing among other improvements.

The route was legally created in the 1970s as the result of a “recreation agreement” between adjacent cities and the County flood control district. Circa 1971, the initial bikeway was just “five-eighths of a mile long” (1 km), between Sepulveda Blvd. and Overland Ave.

In 1973, the Culver City council was asked to approve an extension east from Overland to La Salle Avenue, bringing the total length to a full mile (1.6 km).

A 1974 newspaper article about the successful launch of the Beach Bike Path described the full-length project as “still in the conceptual stage” but outlined the planned intersection of the two routes at the Marina and intention for Culver City's McManus Park to be the eastern terminus.

A major five-mile (8 km) expansion of the bikeway to its current extent took place 1979–1980 under a legal framework and funding agreement between the U.S. Army Corps of Engineers, the county of Los Angeles, the city of Los Angeles and Culver City. All four entities contributed to the construction budget.

The path was described as “uncrowded” and the scenery a “bore” in a 1985 bicycle touring guidebook, which noted that “the trail’s unfortunate termination point [was] a particularly dreary segment of National Boulevard.”

The authors of Bicycle Rides: Los Angeles & Orange Counties (1987) found the route “Lightly used, generally by [recreational cyclists] who are adding extra miles to the South Bay Bike Trail.

In 1989, the Los Angeles Times reported on a series of muggings along the path. In a later story on crime on various bike paths throughout the Southland, the paper stated that “strong-arm bike theft” appeared to be the most common form of violent crime along the path at that time, although a liquor-store employee was shot and killed along the bike path at 4:30 a.m. in July 1990.

Advocacy group Ballona Creek Renaissance was established in 1995; the group was initially focused on painting murals as a beautification effort.

The connecting Expo Bike Path, which runs between downtown Santa Monica and USC, was completed in 2016.

Ballona Creek Bike Path is a little more than half the total distance of the Park to Playa Trail, which was completed in 2020 and links the Baldwin Hills parklands to the seashore.

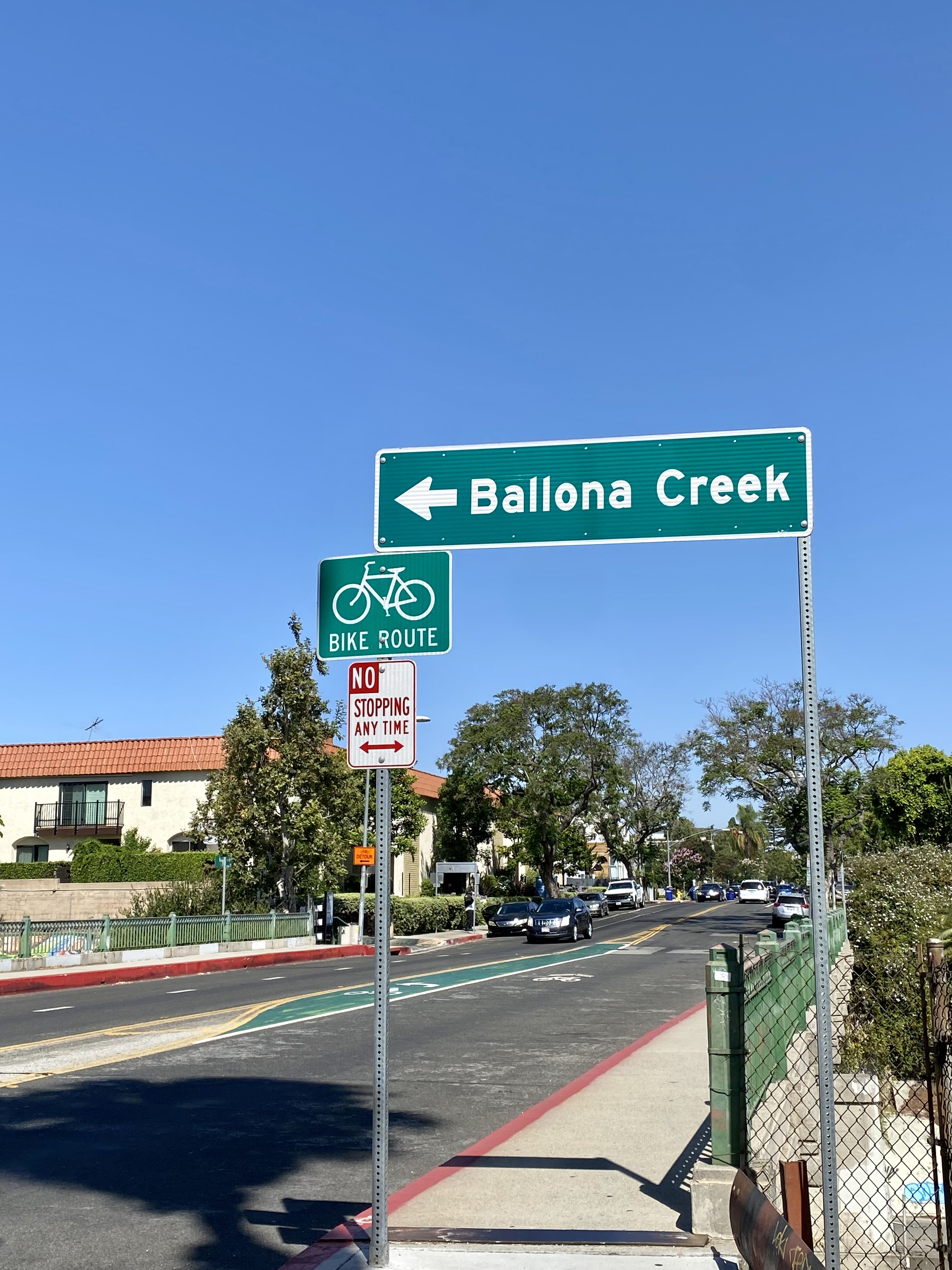
Directional sign on Duquesne Ave. for Park to Playa Trail hikers

== Improvements ==
Sculpted metal gates that depict the wildlife of the estuary, created by artists Brett Goldstone and Lucy Blake-Elahi, have been installed at certain entrances to the bike path, replacing older chain-link fencing. Artist Lindsay Carron and Culver City High School students have painted murals along the route depicting the history and ecology of the Ballona watershed.

Circa a 2003 assessment, “Less than one percent of the plant cover observed along the Ballona Creek could be classified as native species.” Projects intended to increase that percentage (and thus potential habitat for local wildlife) have generally been alongside the bike path due to the hardscaping limitations of the Ballona Creek channelization.

- Western redbud, ceanothus and monkeyflower were installed on the stretch between Overland Ave. and the pedestrian bridge in 2011
- California wild rose and blue elderberry have been planted at the rain garden established in 2012 east of the Jackson Avenue gate (and on the opposite bank near Pearson Street)
- Cleveland sage and California sycamores were planted at Milton Street Park, a linear park and “green street” completed in 2018.

Planned infrastructure improvements include a new bike-path access ramp with the Higuera Street bridge replacement; opening is scheduled for December 2022.

== Proposed extensions ==
Local advocates for active transportation have suggested extending the bike path inland, to the eastern end of the creek in the Mid-City neighborhood.

The hypothetical "Mid-City Greenway" or "Mid-City Ballona District" would incorporate existing infrastructure like planting beds built in 1974, while adding new stormwater infrastructure, micro-mobility access, and wayfinding markers. The existing greenway infrastructure is on the south side of the creek, while rest of the bike path is on the north side, so a bridge connecting the banks would possibly be built at Smiley Drive (just east of where the Adams Channel tributary enters Ballona).

Infrastructure obstacles to connecting the existing bike path with the Mid-City Greenway include a Los Angeles Department of Water and Power facility and a CalTrans maintenance yard. Additionally, as part of the "Culver City Stormwater Management Master Plan," there are preliminary plans to combine urban runoff mitigation with a possible bike path extension and a potential Adams Channel Natural Park in the vicinity of the Washington Boulevard and La Cienega Boulevard crossings.

Community meetings about extending the bike path began in autumn 2023.

As of July 2025, the extension is gaining momentum and has been fully funded by CTC (California Transportation Commission)

== Gallery ==
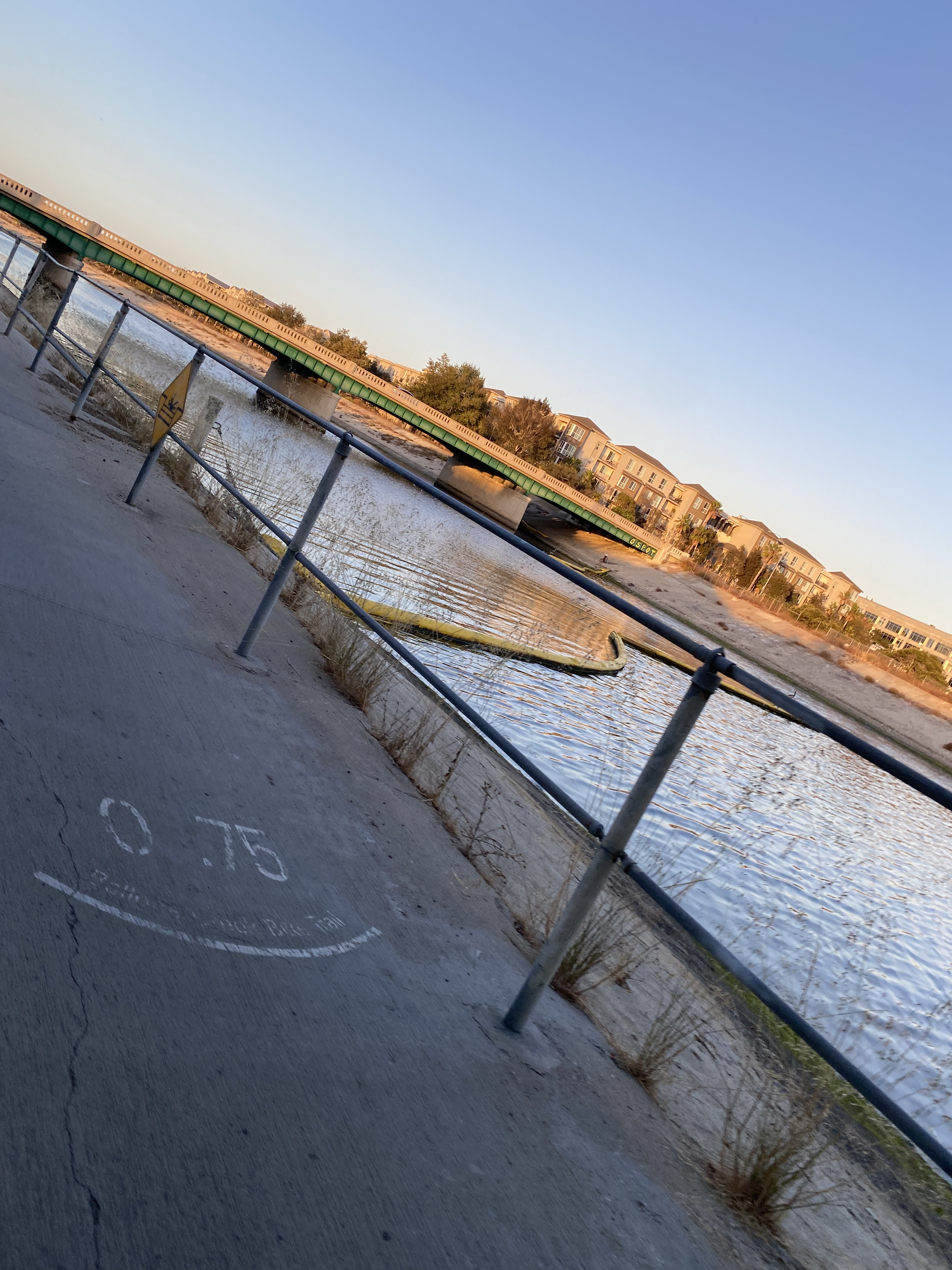
Bike path, heading east

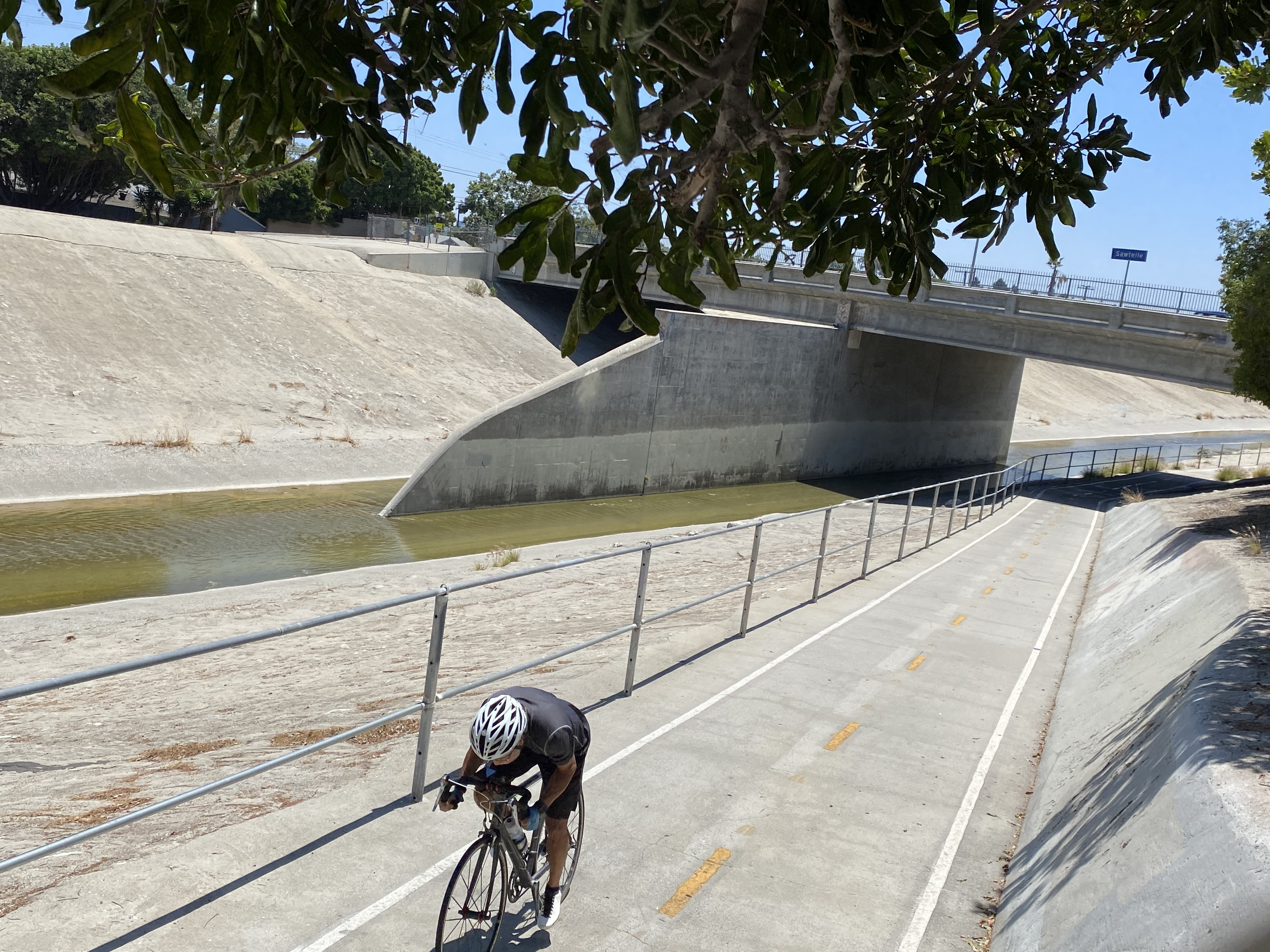
Cyclist using bike path

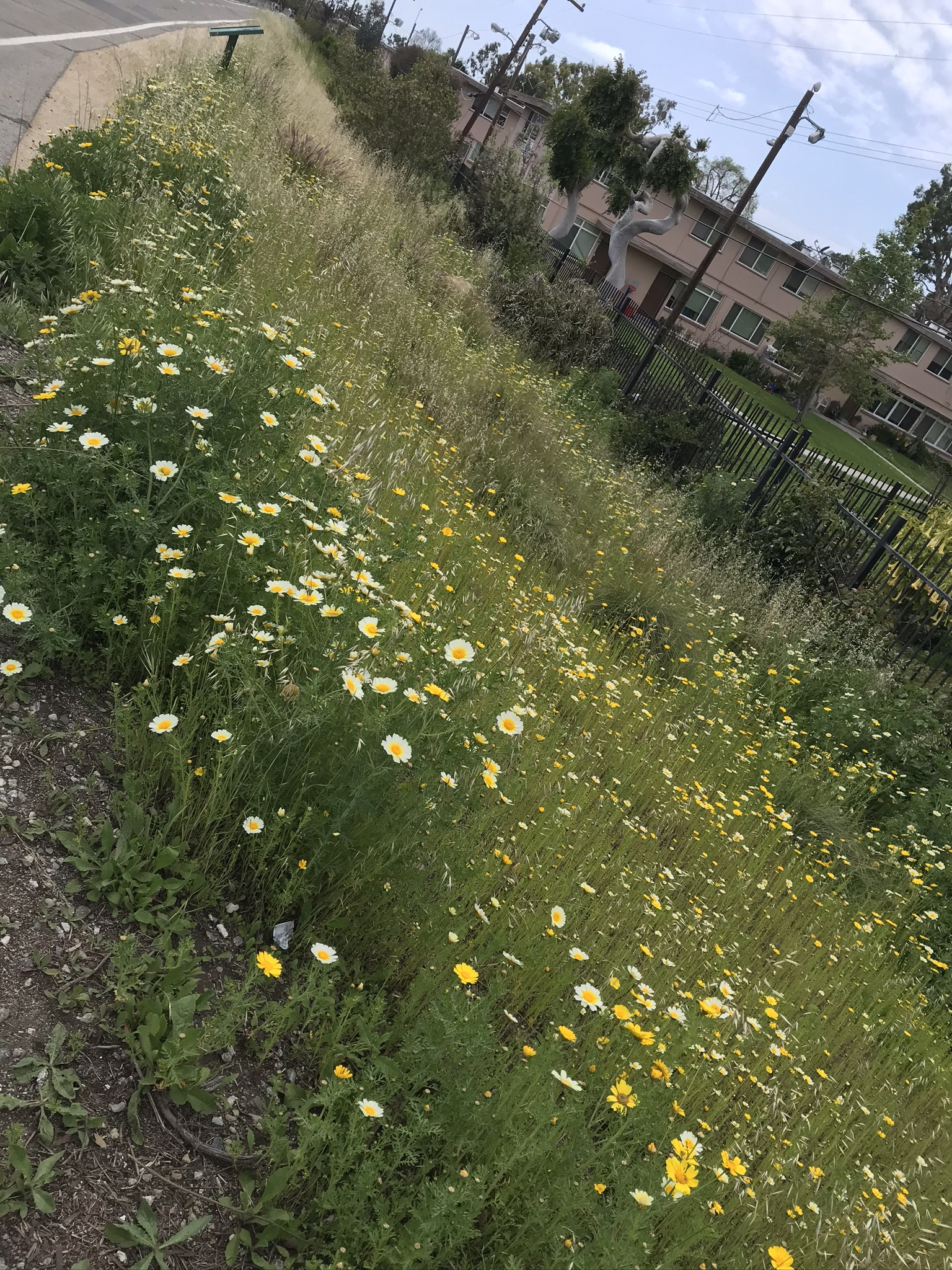
Ballona Greenway near Mar Vista Gardens

== See also ==
- List of Los Angeles bike paths
  - Culver Boulevard Median Bike Path
  - Expo Bike Path
  - Coastal Bike Trail
  - Park to Playa Trail
- Homelessness in Los Angeles County - there are a number of homeless encampments along the path
