= Park to Playa Trail =

Recreation path in California, US

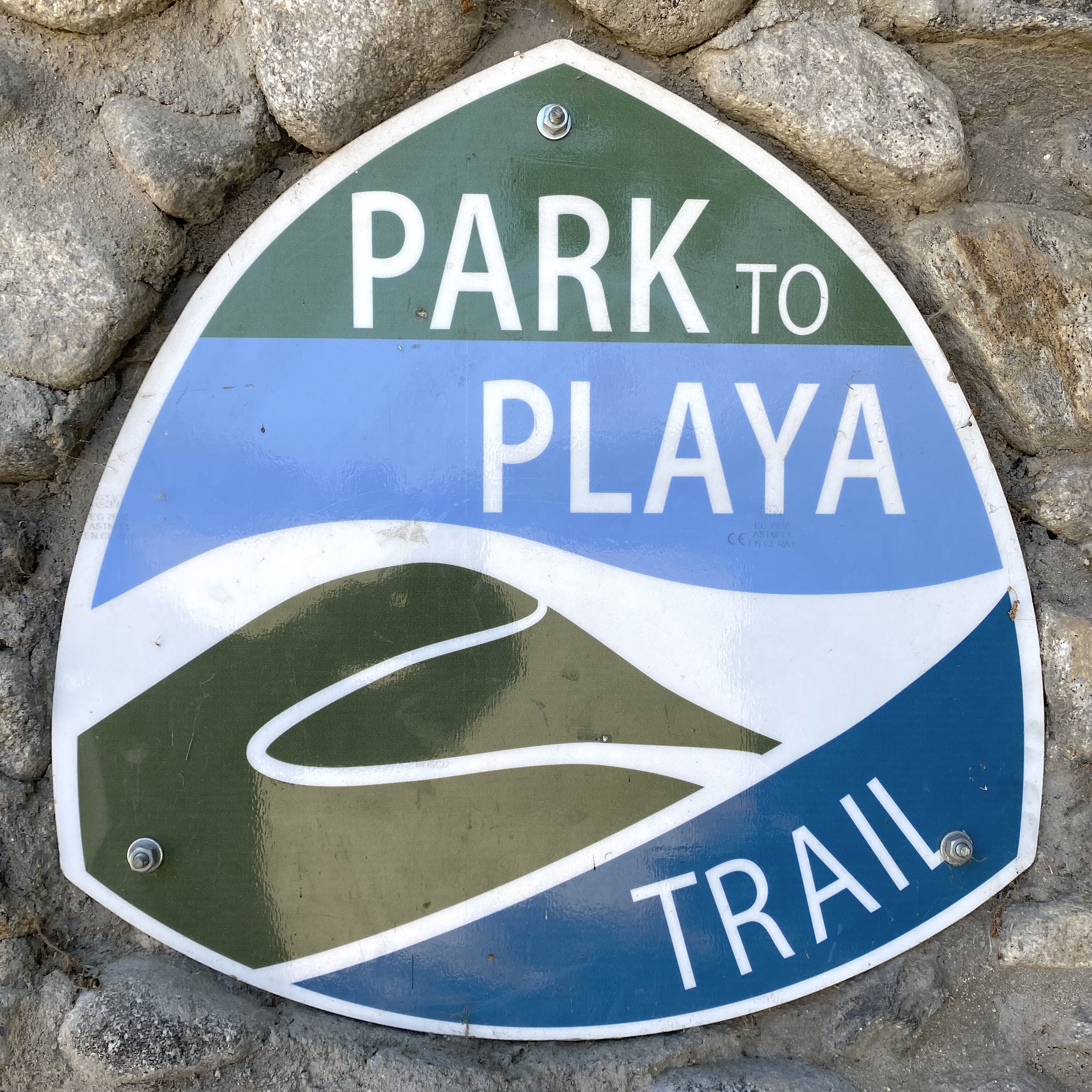
- Trail marker
- Length: 13 mi (21 km)
- Location: Los Angeles County, California, United States
- Established: 2020
- Trailheads: North: 34.0047°N 118.3412°W; South: 34.0167°N 118.3879°W
- Use: Biking, walking, mixed
- Difficulty: Mixed

The Park to Playa Trail in Los Angeles County, California is a 13-mile (21 km) pedestrian and bicycle route that connects the Baldwin Hills parklands to the Pacific Ocean (Playa is beach in Spanish). According to the Los Angeles Times, “Good views of L.A. are guaranteed on the dirt-and-paved track from Baldwin Hills to Playa del Rey.”

== Segments ==
Various aspects of the trail have existed for decades but the trail was considered "complete" when the bridge over La Cienega Blvd. was opened in 2020.

Park to Playa Trail segments (roughly east to west):

Access gates
Image	Name	Description	Address
	Stocker Corridor	Park to Playa trailhead, including fruit park, 1.4-mile (2.3 km) dirt trail	Intersection of Stocker Street and Presidio Drive.
	Norman O. Houston Park	A 10-acre park opened 1981, named for Norman O. Houston, the park has a 0.8 mi (1.3 km) loop track and workout equipment.	4800 South La Brea, 90008
	Reuben Ingold Park	Opened 1972 in the View Park-Windsor Hills neighborhood. Named after real estate developer Reuben Ingold	4400 West Mount Vernon Drive, 90043
	Kenneth Hahn State Recreation Area	Established 1983 as Baldwin Hills SRA, Kenneth Hahn is a 400-acre (1.6 km^{2}) major regional park built on the site of the 1965 Baldwin Hills Dam disaster. Trails to navigate through the park include La Brea Loop Trail to the maintenance road to the Bowl Loop (aka Janice's Green Valley), or the Five Points Trail to the Boy Scouts Trail to the Bowl Loop. Amenities at Kenneth Hahn include “two fishing lakes, picnic areas, an archery range, parking for 478 cars, spectacular city views, and an Olympic Forest, with ponds and paths that twist down the hillside.”	4100 South La Cienega Blvd, 90056
	Park to Playa Bridge	Opened 2020, this is a 440-foot (130 m) metal-truss pedestrian and bike bridge with an accompanying landscaped wildlife crossing, formally Mark Ridley Thomas Bridge (after Mark Ridley Thomas, a long-time local politician)	Although it crosses La Cienega, it is not readily accessible on foot due to the "steady whoosh of nearby La Cienega [car] traffic." Pedestrians can get to the bridge from multiple routes through the adjacent parks.
	Stoneview Nature Center	Opened 2017, formerly a Culver City primary school campus, now one of a network of 10 urban nature centers run by Los Angeles County Parks & Recreation. The site offers edible plantings and a demonstration kitchen, classes for kids, outdoor fitness equipment, a butterfly dome and an apiary.	5950 Stoneview Drive, 90232
	Blair Hills Corridor	Blair Hills Corridor is a connecting trail along ridgetop of the Blair Hills neighborhood of Culver City.	
	Baldwin Hills Scenic Overlook State Park	Baldwin Hills Scenic Overlook state park opened 2009	6300 Hetzler Rd. Culver City 90232
	Culver City Park	Culver City Park, opened 1980, offers an "excellent scenic vista." Authors of a 1987 cycle-touring guide "highly recommended" a Ballona Creek Bike Path detour into the heights of this park long before Park to Playa Trail was conceived. Their directions were to "take Duquesne Avenue east across Jefferson Boulevard and proceed uphill…about one mile from the creek exit point. At the top of the route, stop and enjoy one of the most spectacular, unobstructed views of the greater Los Angeles Basin available in the South Bay Area. Note that this [detour] has some steep uphill along an unshaded route."	9910 Jefferson Blvd, 90232
	Ballona Creek Bike Path	Opened in 1980, connects to Beach Bike Path at the waterfront and connects to Expo Bike Path to the east	Duquesne Ave. & Jefferson Blvd.

== See also ==
- List of Los Angeles bike paths
  - Coastal Bike Trail
  - Expo Bike Path
  - Culver Boulevard Median Bike Path
- Baldwin Hills (mountain range)
- Backbone Trail
