= Kenneth Hahn State Recreation Area =

Los Angeles County recreation area opened 1984

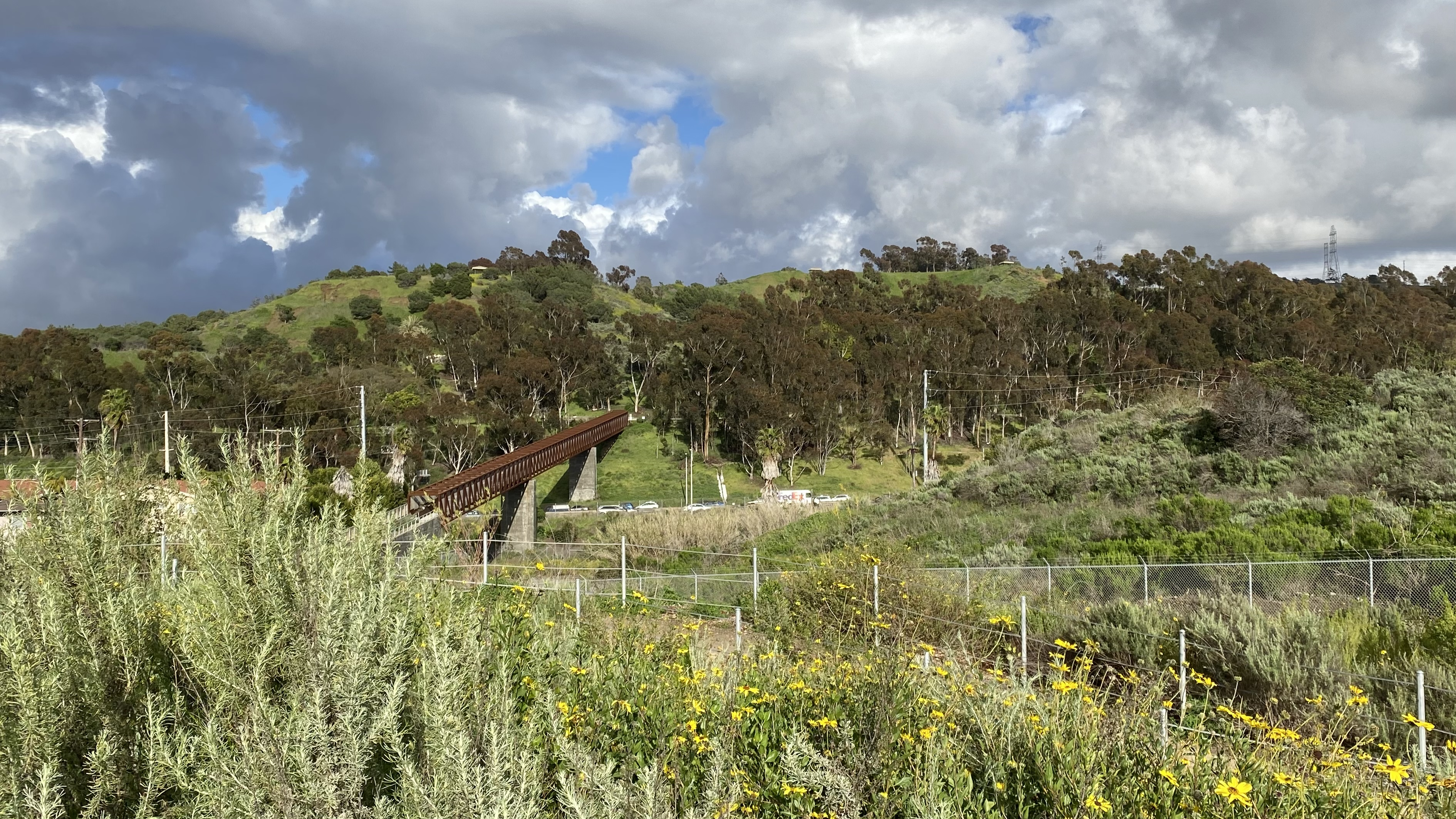
- Kenneth Hahn State Recreation Area view from western Baldwin Hills; the bridge crosses La Cienega Boulevard and is part of the 13 mi (21 km) Park-to-Playa Trail

- Location within California Location within the United States
- Location: Los Angeles County, California, United States
- Nearest city: Los Angeles, California
- Coordinates: 34°0′31″N 118°21′55″W
- Area: 401 acres (1.62 km^{2})
- Established: 1984
- Governing body: California Department of Parks and Recreation

Kenneth Hahn State Recreation Area, or Kenneth Hahn Park, is a state park unit of California in the Baldwin Hills Mountains of Los Angeles. The park is managed by the Los Angeles County Department of Parks and Recreation. As one of the largest urban parks and regional open spaces in the Greater Los Angeles Area, many have called it "L.A.'s Central Park". The 401-acre (1.62 km^{2}) park was established in 1984. The land was previously the Baldwin Hills Reservoir, which failed catastrophically in the 1963 Baldwin Hills Dam disaster.

In 1988, four years after it opened, the Los Angeles Times noted that:

Few Southern Californians seem to know about a park in Baldwin Hills, but the clean, well-developed park is no secret to nearby residents, who enjoy weekend picnics and barbecues on the expansive lawns.

== Recreation ==
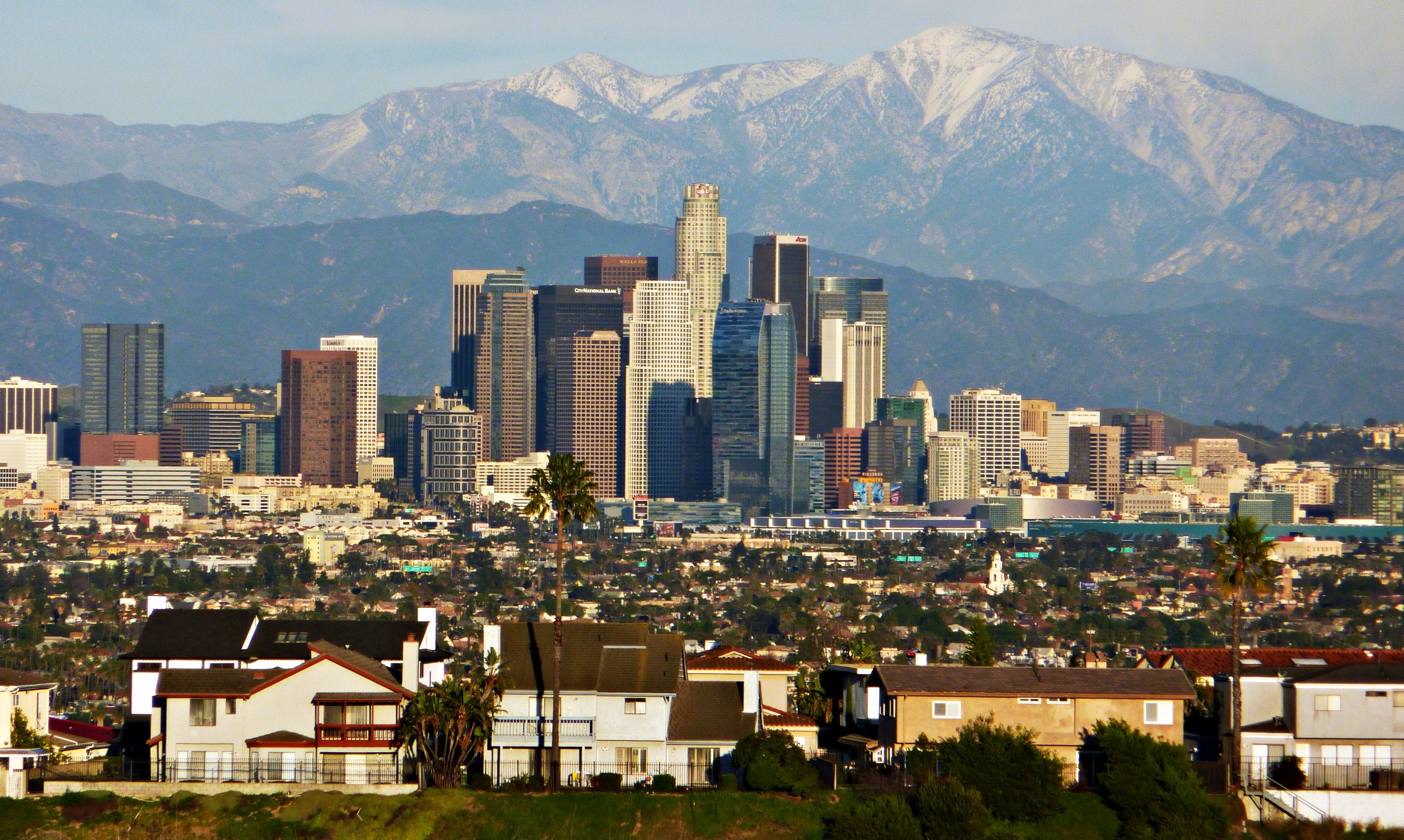
Downtown Los Angeles and the San Gabriel Mountains from Kenneth Hahn SRA

Hahn Park offers walking and hiking trails with scenic vistas:

- North to the Hollywood Sign
- East to the Downtown Los Angeles high-rises and San Gabriel Mountains behind them
- Southeast to the Santa Ana Mountains
- South to the Los Angeles Harbor area
- Southwest to Santa Monica Bay, Los Angeles International Airport, and the Pacific Ocean
- West to the Santa Monica Mountains

The park provides facilities for picnics and family gatherings, including 100 picnic tables distributed among several designated areas. Recreational amenities include four playgrounds, a half basketball court, a multipurpose field, and a sand volleyball court. Its landscaped areas consist of a Japanese garden with a lotus pond and waterfall. In 2017, a nine-hole disc golf course was established along the park's north bowl.

The park has six public restroom facilities, which are locked daily at 5:30 p.m.

=== Lake ===
There is a lake for fishing, stocked monthly with trout or catfish, depending on the weather season.

Since 2004, the park, primarily the bowl, has been the site of the Southern California USATF Cross Country Championships.

=== Trails ===
There are at least 7 mi (11 km) of walking paths through the park. LA County Trails app for Android and iPhone has detailed maps and route guides.

- Burke Roche Trail, 2.2 mi (3.5 km)
- Rim Trail
- Bowl Loop, 0.8 mi (1.3 km)
- Ridge trail, 2.6 mi (4.2 km)
- Waterfall Trail, 1 mi (1.6 km)
- Ballfield Walking Path, .5 mi (0.80 km)

=== Entrance ===
Admission is charged for cars entering the park on weekends and holidays only (weekdays free). Transferable annual passes are available.

While there may be a fee for entry by vehicle, there is no charge to visitors using transit or hikers and cyclists entering the park. The county operates a circuit bus that visits the park every half hour on weekends and holidays, and a map of nearby bus routes and bike paths is available.

Kenneth Hahn SRA is one of the few California State Parks that does not accept the "annual day use pass".

== Ecology ==
The park supports a variety of wildlife, including urban coyotes, California ground squirrel, gray foxes, raccoons, striped skunk, desert cottontails, opossums, and California quail.

The site attracts a range of bird species, such as hummingbirds, hawks, great horned owls, northern mockingbirds and blue scrub-jays. It has also become a gathering place for participants in the Black Birders Week movement. The surrounding Baldwin Hills area provides nesting habitat for 41 bird species, and the Audubon Society organizes monthly birdwatching walks.

The park lies adjacent to the 1,000-acre (4.0 km^{2}) Inglewood Oil Field. Together with the surrounding parkland, the oil field provides an unusually extensive habitat for urban wildlife in Los Angeles. Kenneth Hahn RSA and neighboring parks support four snake species: the gopher snake, California kingsnake, ring-necked snake and red coachwhip. Despite warning signs indicating otherwise, rattlesnakes are not currently found in the Baldwin Hills, as they do not fare well in urban environments.

Kenneth Hahn's native vegetation is characterized by coastal sage scrub, with oak woodlands in northern arroyos and bunch grass dominated grasslands on the exposed, wind-swept terrain in the southwest. Native plant species include California sagebrush, coyote brush and prickly pear. Invasive plants found in the park include black mustard, castor bean, milk thistle, agave, ice plant, nasturtium, and lantana.

The Los Angeles Times reported in 1988 that "the native plant community has been greatly altered by the hand of man, so much so that botanists describe Baldwin Hills flora as being in a condition called disclimax,"

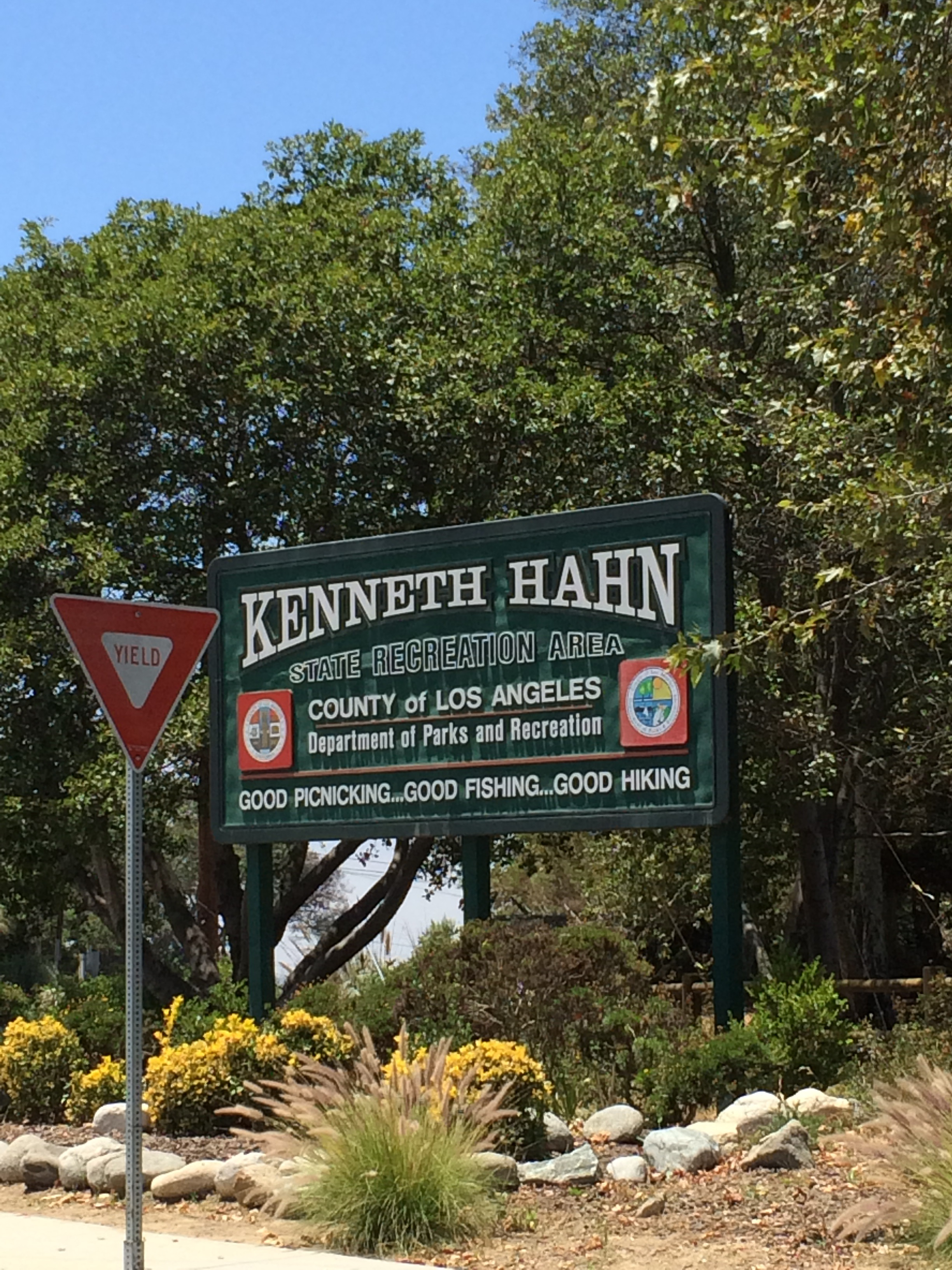
SRA sign

Olympic forest

To commemorate Los Angeles’ role in the Olympic movement, 140 trees were planted on the hills formerly occupied by the 1932 Olympic Village, each representing a nation that participated in the 1984 Summer Olympics in Los Angeles.

The forest features plant species associated with participating nations, including sea hibiscus (Seychelles), oleander (Algeria), sweet bay (Greece), cajeput (Papua New Guinea), paper mulberry (Togo), carob (Cyprus), and date palm (Egypt).

== History ==
=== The Hills ===
The Baldwin Hills were part of the ancestral homeland of the Tongva people, who inhabited the area for more than 8,000 years. In the 19th century, the region formed part of the Spanish and Mexican Ranchos of California land grants, with Rancho Rincon de los Bueyes and Rancho La Cienega o Paso de la Tijera encompassing areas in and around the present-day park. As Los Angeles expanded rapidly during the 20th century, the rugged terrain of this section of the Baldwin Hills helped limit urban development.

In 1932, the area east of the park served as the site of the first Olympic Village, constructed for the 1932 Summer Olympics, officially known as the Games of the X Olympiad, hosted by Los Angeles.

In the late 1940s, Los Angeles transportation master plans proposed a new north–south freeway, the Laurel Canyon Freeway (SR-170), that would have bisected the Baldwin Hills and the present-day park site, crossing the hills along the route now occupied by La Cienega Boulevard.

The Baldwin Hills Reservoir was constructed between 1947 and 1951. In 1963, the Baldwin Hills Dam disaster caused the reservoir's dam to catastrophically collapse, destroying homes in the surrounding canyon, flooding the landmark Baldwin Hills Village (now Village Green), and killing five residents who had not evacuated. Television coverage of the disaster marked the first live broadcast of aerial footage. Before the county demolished the ruined reservoir bowl and converted the land into parking and picnic areas circa 1990s, "Fennel, chamise and dandelion pushed through the cracked cement bottom of the reservoir" and it was overlooked by an "observation tower" that resembled "a castle from the Middle Ages".

The bowl of the reservoir (now called Janice's Green Valley) has been planted with grass and trees but remains visible and is the site of a popular jogging track.

=== Park development ===
The Los Angeles County Board of Supervisors began negotiations to acquire the site of the Baldwin Hills Dam disaster in 1976. The area opened in 1983 as the Baldwin Hills State Recreational Area and was renamed in 1988 to honor Supervisor Kenneth Hahn and his efforts to preserve the site.

Kenneth Hahn is the father of James Hahn, a former mayor of Los Angeles, and Janice Hahn, a former U.S. Representative who also serves on the County Board of Supervisors.

At the time, the area was a popular spot for motocross, a then-emerging sport, and was known locally as "Motorcycle Hill". During the holiday season, an abandoned oil well at the hill's summit was decorated with lights, giving it the appearance of a giant Christmas tree at night.

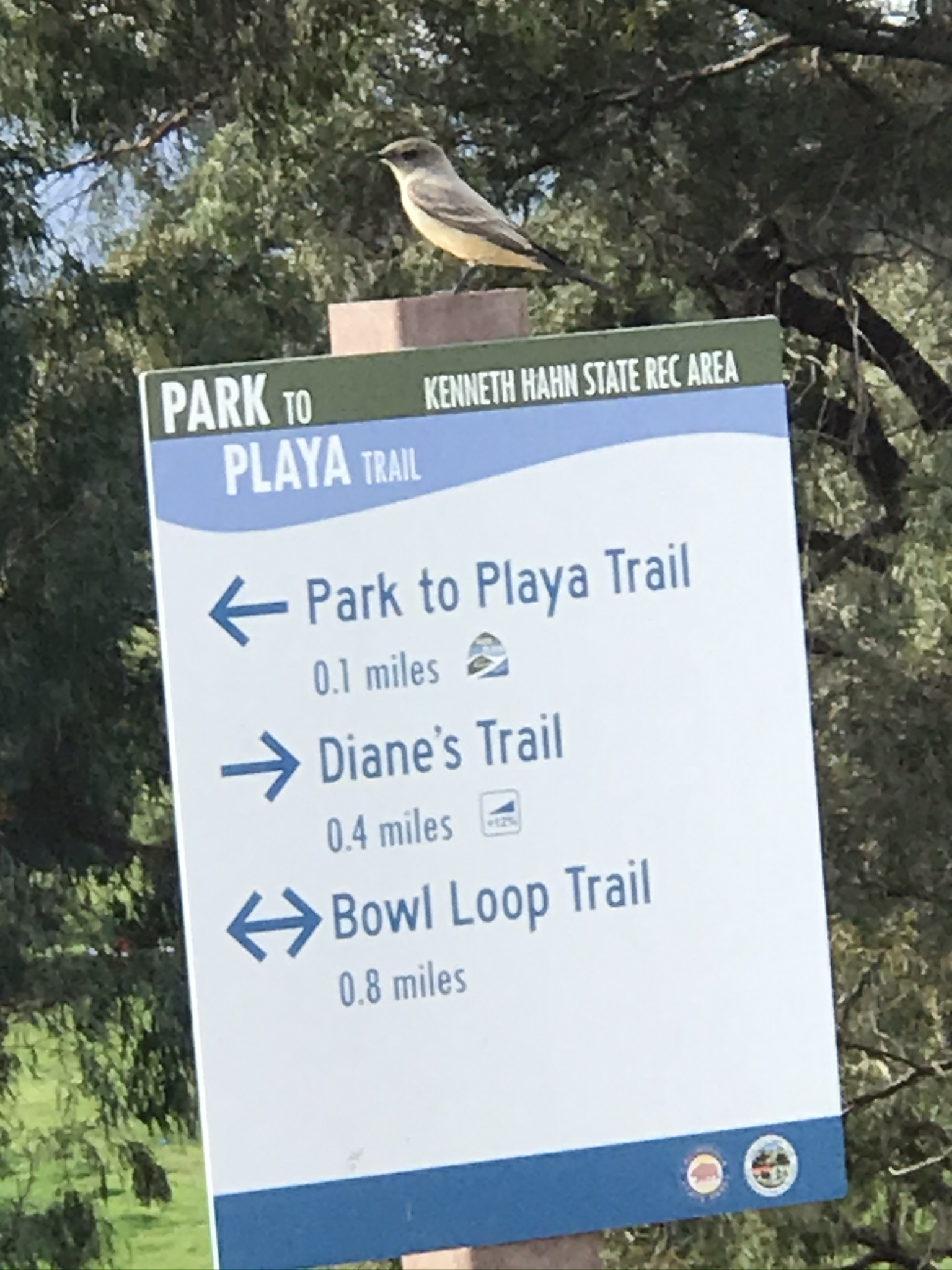
Say's Phoebe perched atop sign indicating Park to Playa Trail connection.

The park is home to the Dr. Martin Luther King Jr. Memorial Tree Grove.

The site lies within the Ballona Creek watershed and is connected to nearby open spaces across La Cienega Blvd. by the Park to Playa Bridge. It forms a key section of the Park to Playa Trail, which was completed 2020.

Due to budget cuts in Los Angeles County, Kenneth Hahn SRA became one of six regional parks closed on Mondays and Tuesdays, beginning June 30, 2025.

== In popular culture ==
- The park has been used as a filming location for films, television shows and videos; including:
  - HBO's Insecure
  - Buffy the Vampire Slayer's musical episode "Once More, with Feeling"
  - Mighty Morphin Power Rangers
  - The golf scene in the film Swordfish, in the adjacent oil field
  - The music video for Dr. Dre and Snoop Dogg's "Nuthin' but a G Thang"
- The park is mentioned in the song "The Ice Plant Amphitheater" by folk singer John Craigie
- The park is featured in the video game Midnight Club: Los Angeles

== See also ==
- List of California state parks
- Park to Playa Trail
