= Los Angeles County Department of Parks and Recreation =

Agency of the County of Los Angeles

Department overview
- Formed: July 1, 1903; 123 years ago
- Preceding agencies: Forester and Fire Warden's Office; Department of Recreation, Camps and Playgrounds
- Jurisdiction: Los Angeles County
- Headquarters: 433 South Vermont Avenue, Los Angeles, California 90020; 34°03′59″N 118°17′31″W
- Employees: 1,477 (2010)
- Annual budget: US$149,369,000 (2010)
- Department executive: Norma Edith García-Gonzalez, Director
- Website: parks.lacounty.gov

The Los Angeles County Department of Parks and Recreation is an agency of the County of Los Angeles which oversees its parks and recreational facilities. It was created in 1944. It operates and maintains over 71,249 acres (28,833 ha) of parks, gardens, lakes, natural gardens, and golfing greens, and 200 miles (320 km) of trails.

It maintains 183 parks and operates the world's largest municipal golf course system with 20 courses. It also owns the Hollywood Bowl and the John Anson Ford Amphitheatre.

Weddings can be held at the Los Angeles County Arboretum and Botanic Garden in Arcadia, Descanso Gardens in La Canada Flintridge, South Coast Botanic Garden on the Palos Verdes Peninsula, and Magic Johnson Park in Willowbrook. Virginia Robinson Gardens is open for tours.

== Los Angeles County nature centers ==
Los Angeles County Department of Parks and Recreation operates nature centers at:

- Deane Dana Friendship Park and Nature Center
- Devil's Punchbowl Natural Area
- Eaton Canyon Park & Nature Center
- Placerita Canyon Nature Center
- San Dimas Canyon Nature Center
- Santa Catalina Island Interpretive Center
- Santa Fe Dam Recreation Area
- Stoneview Nature Center, Baldwin Hills
- Vasquez Rocks Natural Area Park
- Whittier Narrows Nature Center

== Los Angeles County fishing lakes ==
It has fishing lakes at:

- Alondra Community Regional Park
- Apollo Community Regional Park
- Belvedere Community Regional Park
- Frank G. Bonelli Regional Park
- Castaic Lake State Recreation Area
- Cerritos Community Regional Park
- Kenneth Hahn State Recreation Area
- Earvin "Magic" Johnson Park
- La Mirada Community Regional Park
- Santa Fe Dam Recreation Area
- Whittier Narrows Recreation Area

== History ==
The department hosts approximately 300 film projects a year, including feature films, television series, television commercials, and still photography shoots for various magazines and publications.

Safety and law enforcement services are provided on a contract basis from the Los Angeles County Sheriff's Department's Parks Bureau. Prior to 2010, the Los Angeles County Office of Public Safety (County Police) and its predecessor agencies were responsible for law enforcement in the county parks.

Due to the Los Angeles County's budget cuts, the following six regional parks have been closed on Mondays and Tuesdays, starting from June 30, 2025: Castaic, Frank G. Bonelli, Kenneth Hahn, Peter F. Schabarum, Santa Fe Dam, and Whittier Narrows. The radio station LAist attributed the cuts to the County's declining revenue, factored by loss of federal funding, the January 2025 wildfires affecting southern California, and a $4 billion settlement for child sexual abuse cases occurred in County-operated juvenile halls and other facilities.

== Management and Commission ==
Since 2020, the director is Norma Edith García-Gonzalez. The department is governed by a five-member commission, appointed by the Los Angeles County Board of Supervisors.
