= Fox Hills, Culver City, California =

Coordinates: 33°58′59″N 118°23′14″W

Fox Hills
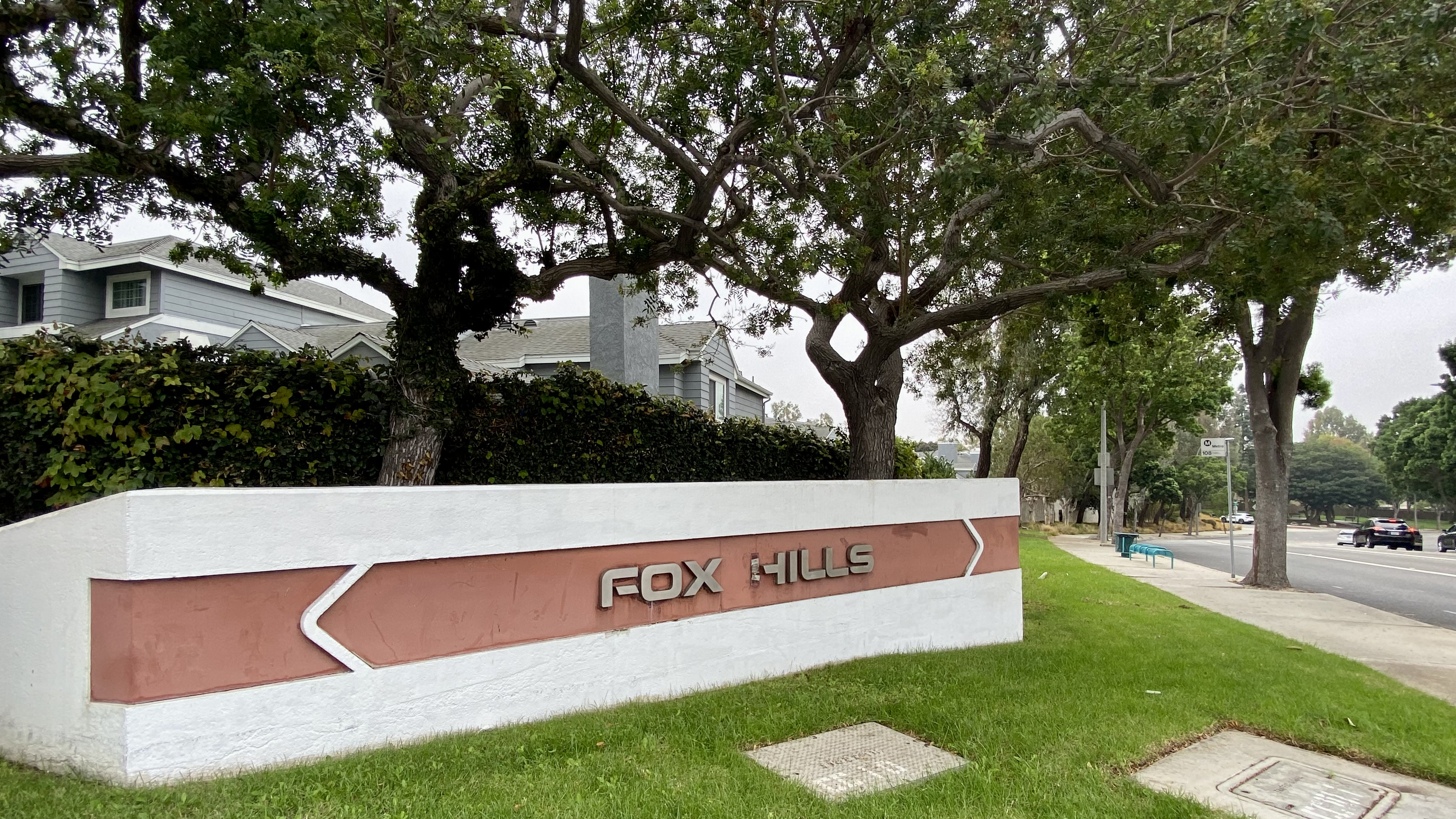
- Fox Hills neighborhood sign along Slauson Avenue
- Interactive map of Fox Hills
- Country: United States
- State: California
- County: Los Angeles
- City: Culver City
- Time zone: Pacific
- Area code: 310/424

Fox Hills is a neighborhood of Culver City, California. It is roughly triangular in shape, bounded by West Slauson Avenue to the north, Centinela Avenue on the south, the San Diego Freeway to the southwest, and Canterbury Drive to the southeast.

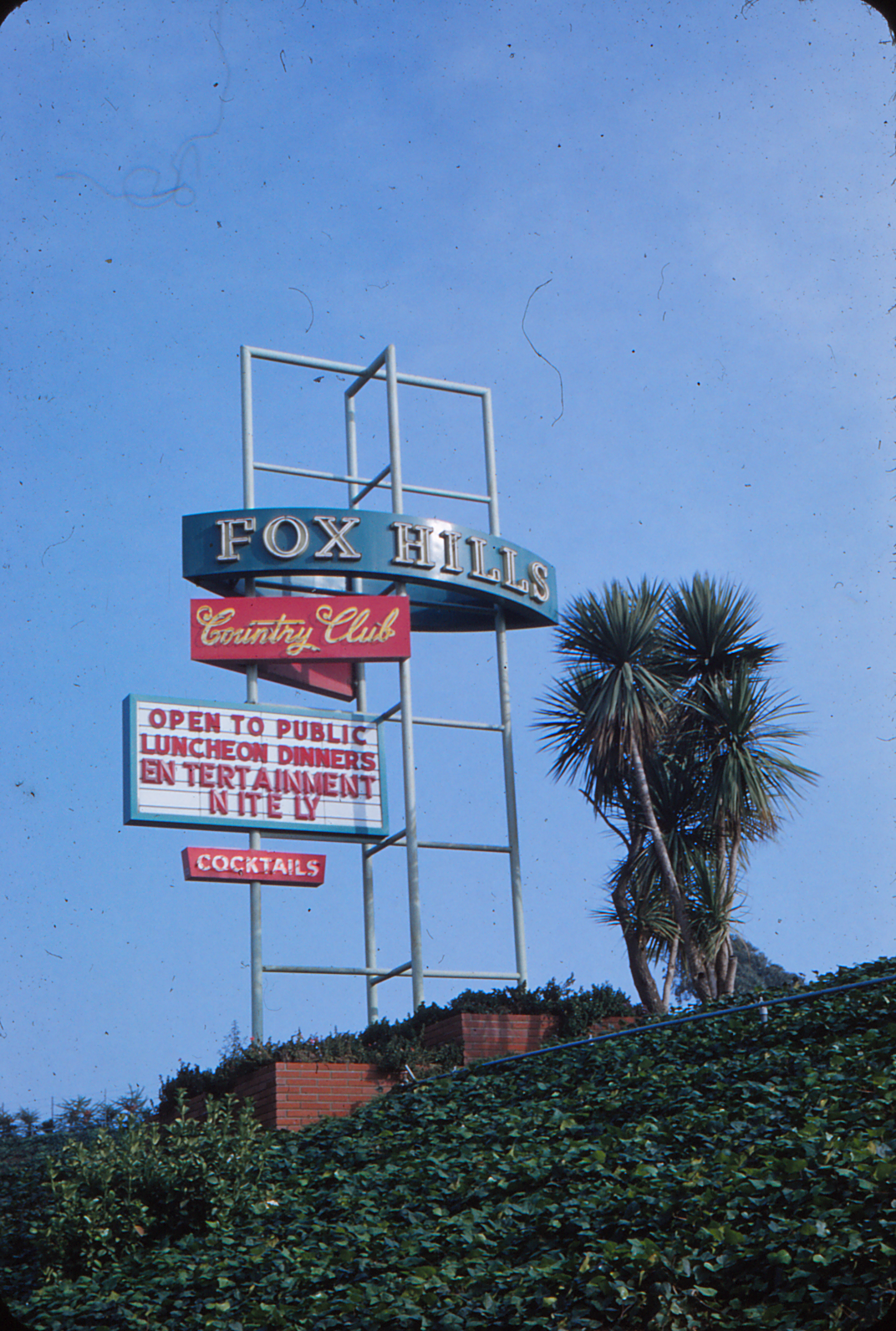
Fox Hills Country Club sign in mid-twentieth century.

Fox Hills was annexed to Culver City in 1964, at which time it consisted of undeveloped land, riding stables, and golf courses. In the 1970s, the neighborhood was developed with apartments, condominiums, and the Fox Hills Mall, an indoor shopping mall complex that opened in 1975.

Fox Hills is served by the Culver CityBus.

The Fox Hills neighborhood is home to Fox Hills Park, which is located at the intersection of Green Valley Circle and Buckingham Parkway. The ten-acre park includes a playground, basketball court, soccer field, tennis court, jogging trail, picnic areas, barbecues, and restroom facilities.

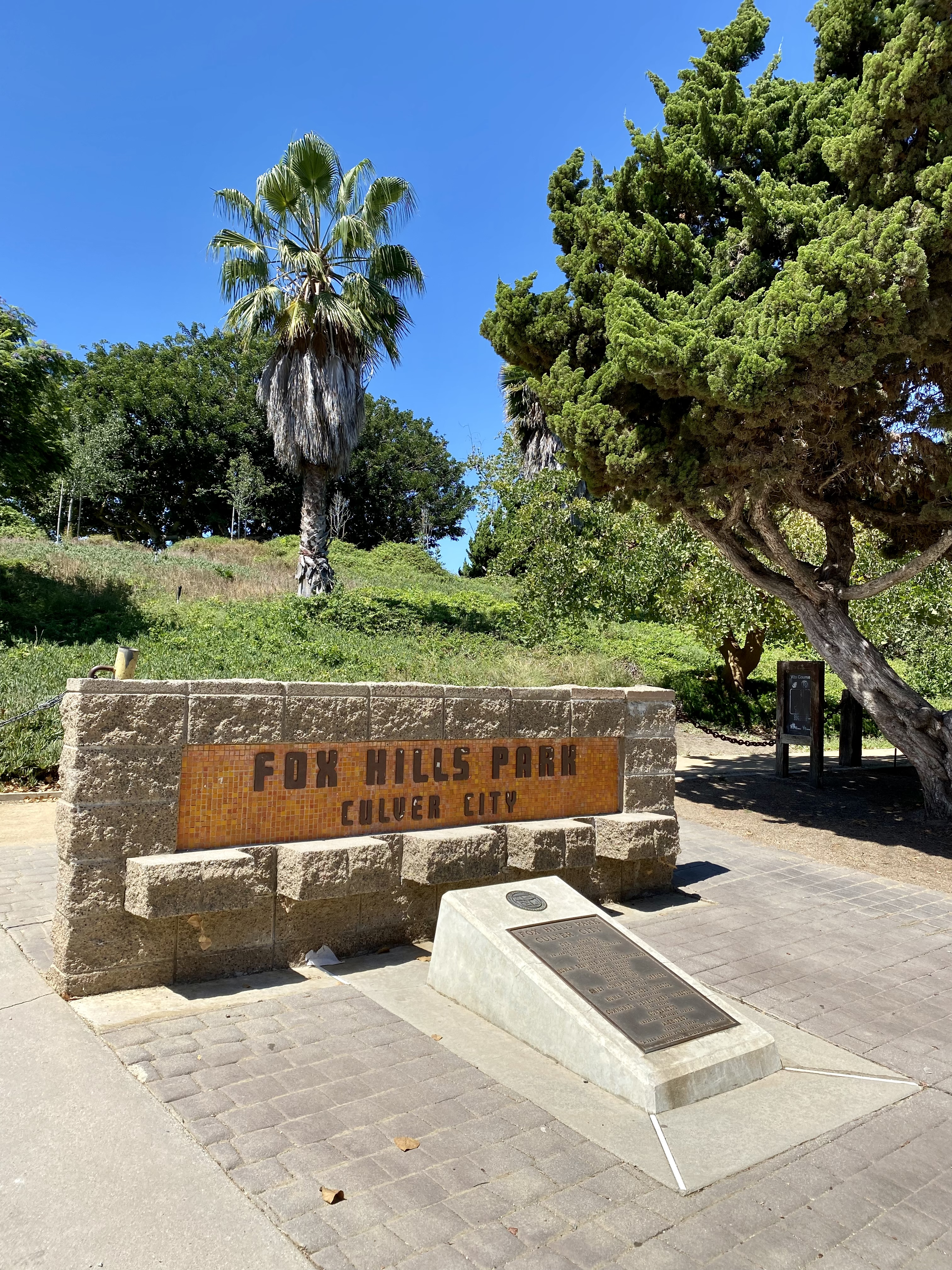
Fox Hills Park sign

Fox Hills residents were assigned to LAUSD schools until 1993 when the neighborhood was transferred to CCUSD.
