= Stoneview Nature Center =

County-operated garden and education center in Culver City, California

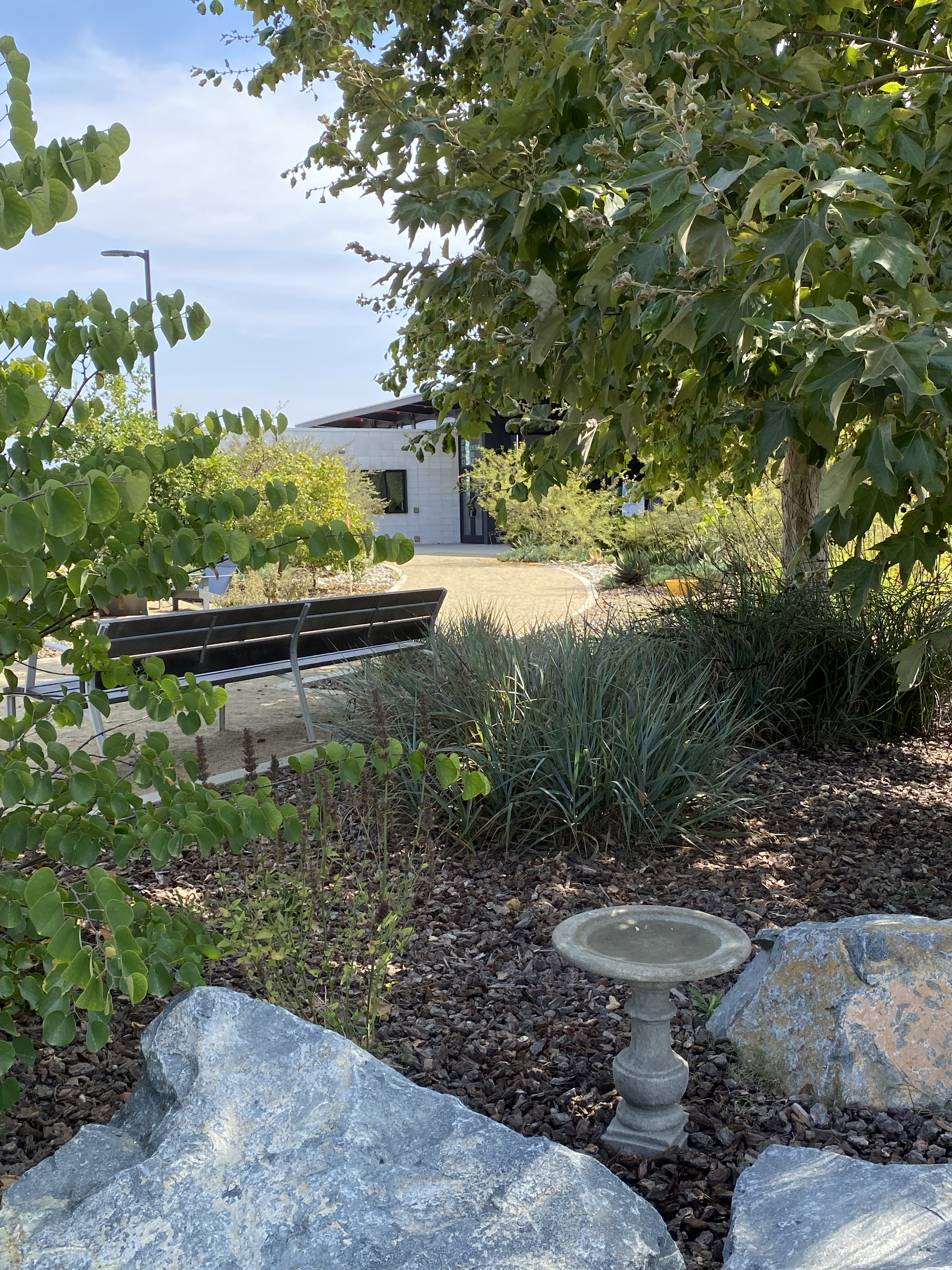
- Stoneview Nature Center
- Interactive map of Stoneview Nature Center
- Location: 5950 Stoneview Dr., Culver City, CA 90232
- Coordinates: 34°00′52″N 118°22′35″W
- Area: 5 acres (20,000 m^{2})
- Established: 2017
- Administrator: Los Angeles County
- Hiking trails: Park to Playa Trail
- Paths: .25 mi (0.40 km) fitness loop
- Habitats: Coastal sage
- Parking: Dedicated lot, limited street parking
- Public transit: Baldwin Hills Link, Culver CityBus route 5
- Website: parks.lacounty.gov

Stoneview Nature Center is a county-operated garden and educational facility in Culver City, California along the Park to Playa Trail.

The nature center building and gardens are part of a “transformation of a five-acre brownfield site in the Baldwin Hills neighborhood of Culver City, California.” The main building, designed by Ehrlich Yanai Rhee Chaney Architects, is 4,000 square feet (370 m^{2}) and features community space, a meeting/classroom, an outdoor kitchen, and bathrooms.

The park, which has a focus on native California and edible plantings, includes a raised-bed Mediterranean demonstration garden, a native grass meadow, and installations by the contemporary art collective Fallen Fruit. The edible landscaping includes oranges, avocados, figs, grapes, lemons, blackberries, and blueberries, and less-familiar California native edibles including lemonade berry, coffee berry and prickly pear.

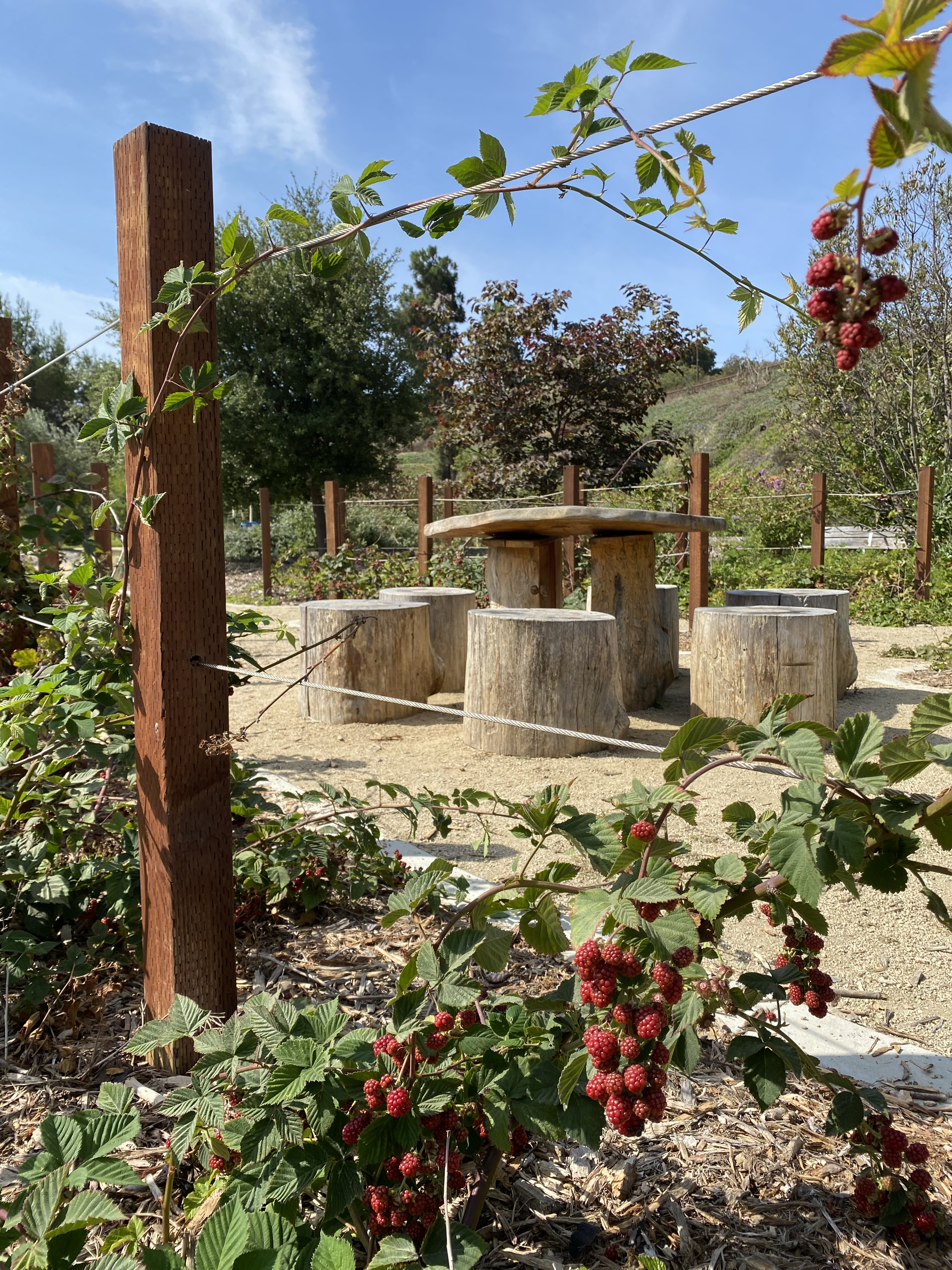
Edible plantings and picnic table

Fitness equipment and workout classes are offered at the park. Stoneview is a key segment of the 13 mi (21 km) Park to Playa Trail; “good views of L.A. are guaranteed on the dirt-and-paved track from Baldwin Hills to Playa del Rey.”

The center operates an apiary in partnership with HoneyLove as well as a furnishing an elaborate hotel for native bee, both as part of a public outreach campaign on the importance of pollinating insects.

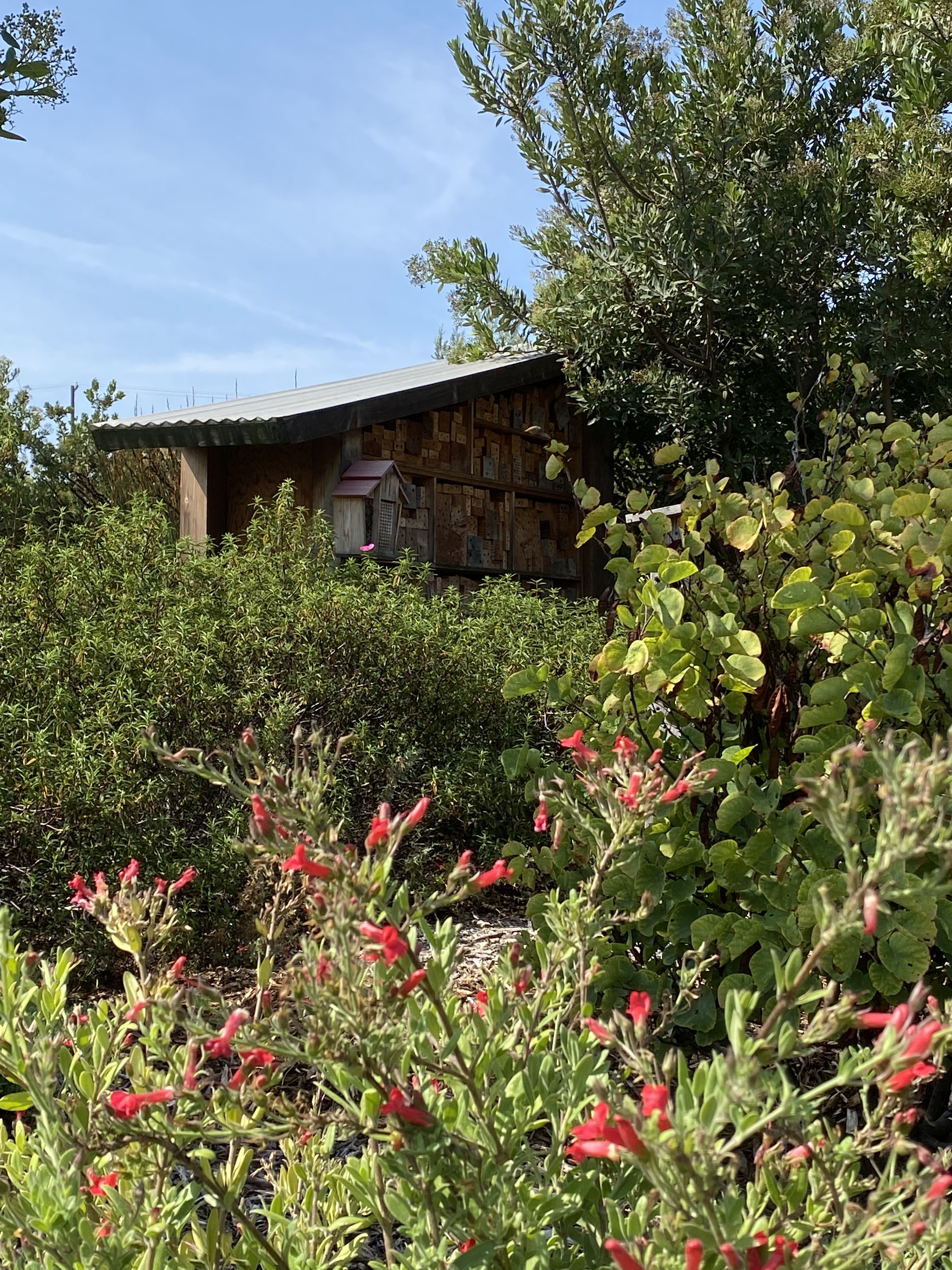
Housing for mason and carpenter bees

The land was previously a primary school campus from 1956 to 2010, and was acquired by the Baldwin Hills Regional Conservation Authority in 2011.

== See also ==
- List of nature centers in California
