= Ballona Creek =

Urbanized river in Los Angeles, California, United States

Ballona Creek Río de La Ballona
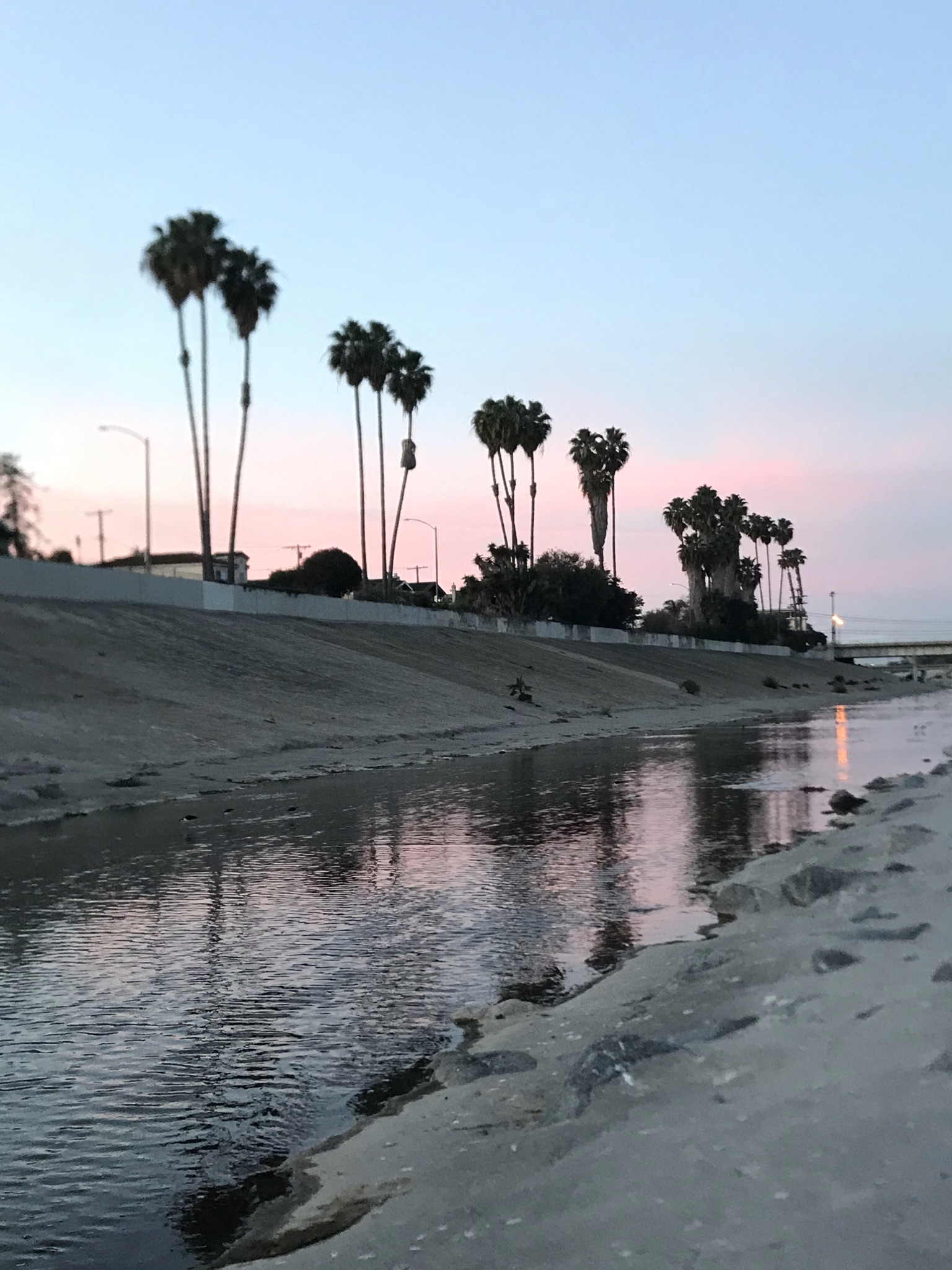
- Ballona Creek at sunrise

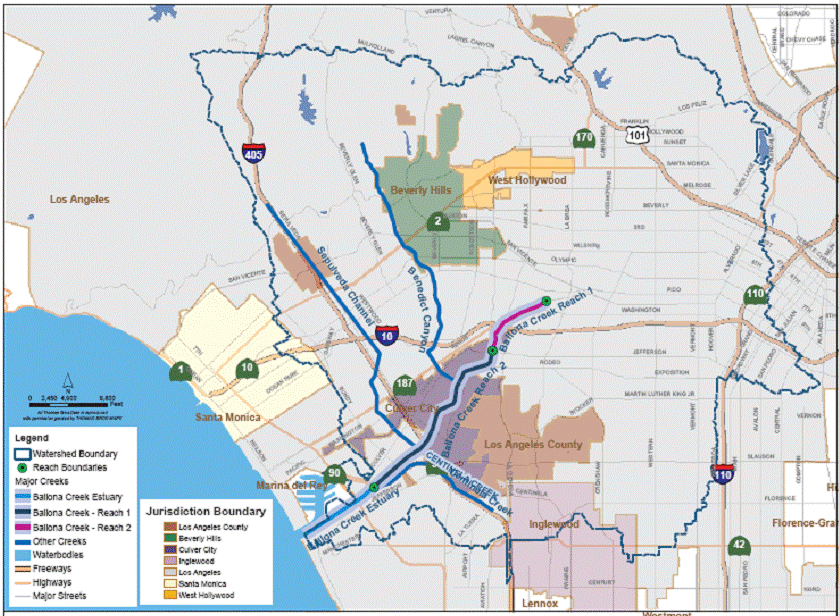
- Ballona watershed

Location
- Country: United States
- State: California
- Region: Los Angeles County
- Cities: Los Angeles, Culver City

Physical characteristics
- Source
  - location: Los Angeles, California
  - coordinates: 34°02′39″N 118°21′12″W
  - elevation: 110 ft (34 m)
- Mouth
  - location: Playa del Rey - Venice, Los Angeles
  - coordinates: 33°57′37″N 118°27′33″W
  - elevation: 0 ft (0 m)

Basin features
- Tributaries
  - left: Centinela Creek (south)
  - right: Sepulveda Creek (north)

Ballona Creek (pronunciation: "Bah-yo-nuh" or "Buy-yo-nah") is an 8.5-mile (13.7 km) channelized stream in southwestern Los Angeles County, California, United States, that was once a "year-round river lined with sycamores and willows". The urban watercourse begins in the Mid-City neighborhood of Los Angeles, flows through Culver City and Del Rey, and passes the Ballona Wetlands Ecological Preserve, the sailboat harbor Marina del Rey, and the small beachside community of Playa del Rey before draining into Santa Monica Bay. The Ballona Creek drainage basin carries water from the Santa Monica Mountains on the north, from the Baldwin Hills to the south, and as far as the Harbor Freeway (I-110) to the east.

Before colonization, the Tongva village of Guashna was located at the mouth of the creek. Ballona Creek and neighboring Ballona Wetlands remain a prime bird-watching spot for waterfowl, shorebirds, warblers, and birds of prey. In 1982, film critic Richard von Busack, a native of Culver City, described the channelized creek as "a cement drainage ditch indistinguishable in size and content from the Love Canal."

== Watershed and course ==
The Ballona Creek watershed totals about 130 square miles (340 square kilometers). According to a 1948 report in the Venice Evening Vanguard, "The total area drained by Ballona Creek consists of 86 square miles (220 km^{2}) square miles of coastal plain and 74 square miles (190 km^{2}) of foothills and plain range from sea level to 250 feet (76 m) and in the mountains from 250 feet (76 m) to 1,550 feet (470 m). The average gradient of the valley floor is about 20 feet per mile (3.8 m/km) and that of the canyon channels is about 200 feet per mile (38 m/km). The longest distance at any given time taken by the water in this drainage system is 17 miles (27 km)." Before most of Los Angeles' watercourses were buried underground, Ballona Creek drained the whole of the west Los Angeles region and fed directly from a chain of ciénegas and lakes that stretched from the Hollywood Hills to the Baldwin Hills.

The major tributaries to the Ballona Creek and estuary include Centinela Creek channel, Sepulveda Creek channel, and Benedict Canyon channel; most of the creek's natural minor tributaries have been destroyed by development or paved over and flow into Ballona Creek as a network of underground storm drains.

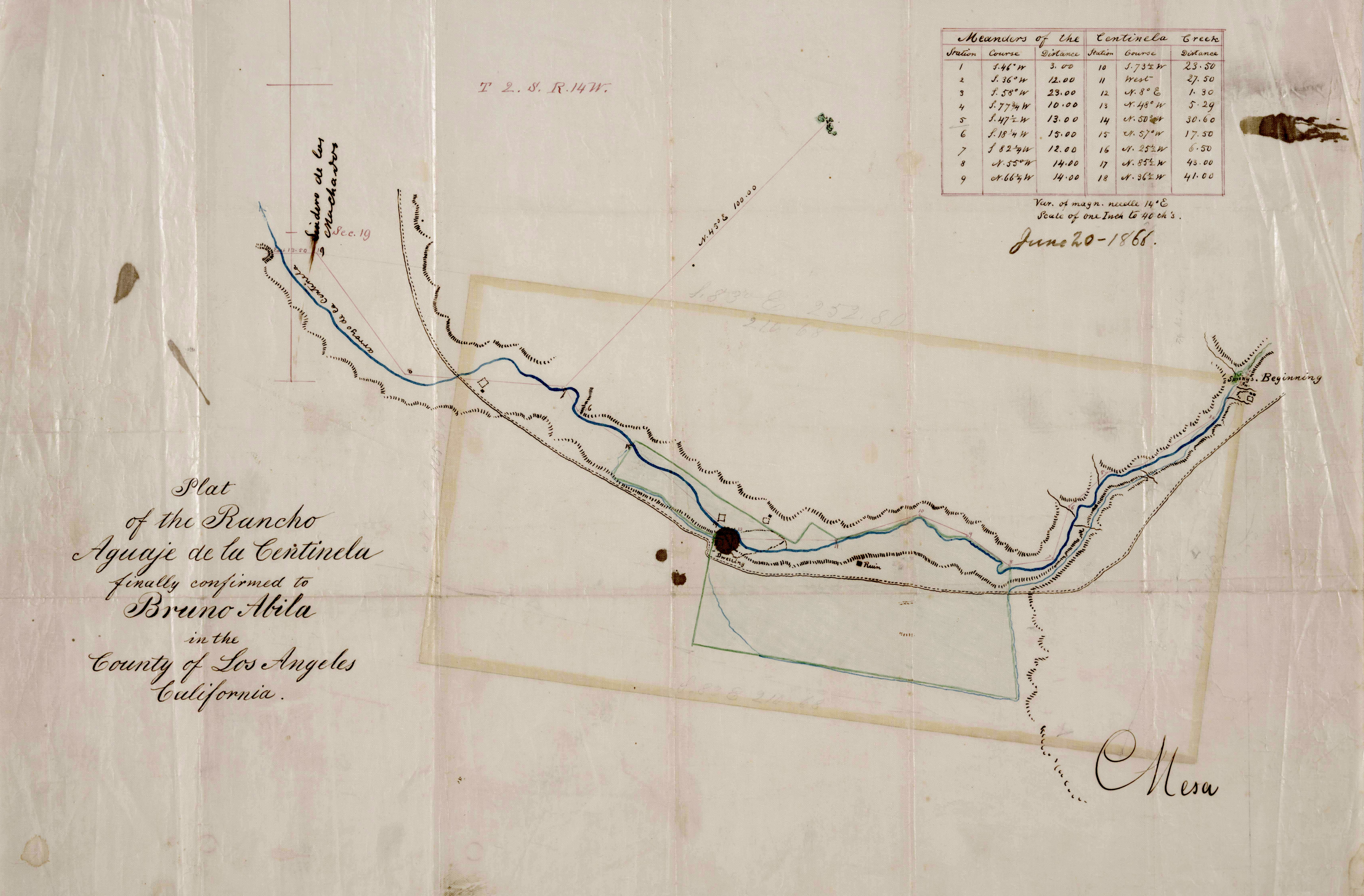
Centinela Creek, mapped in 1866

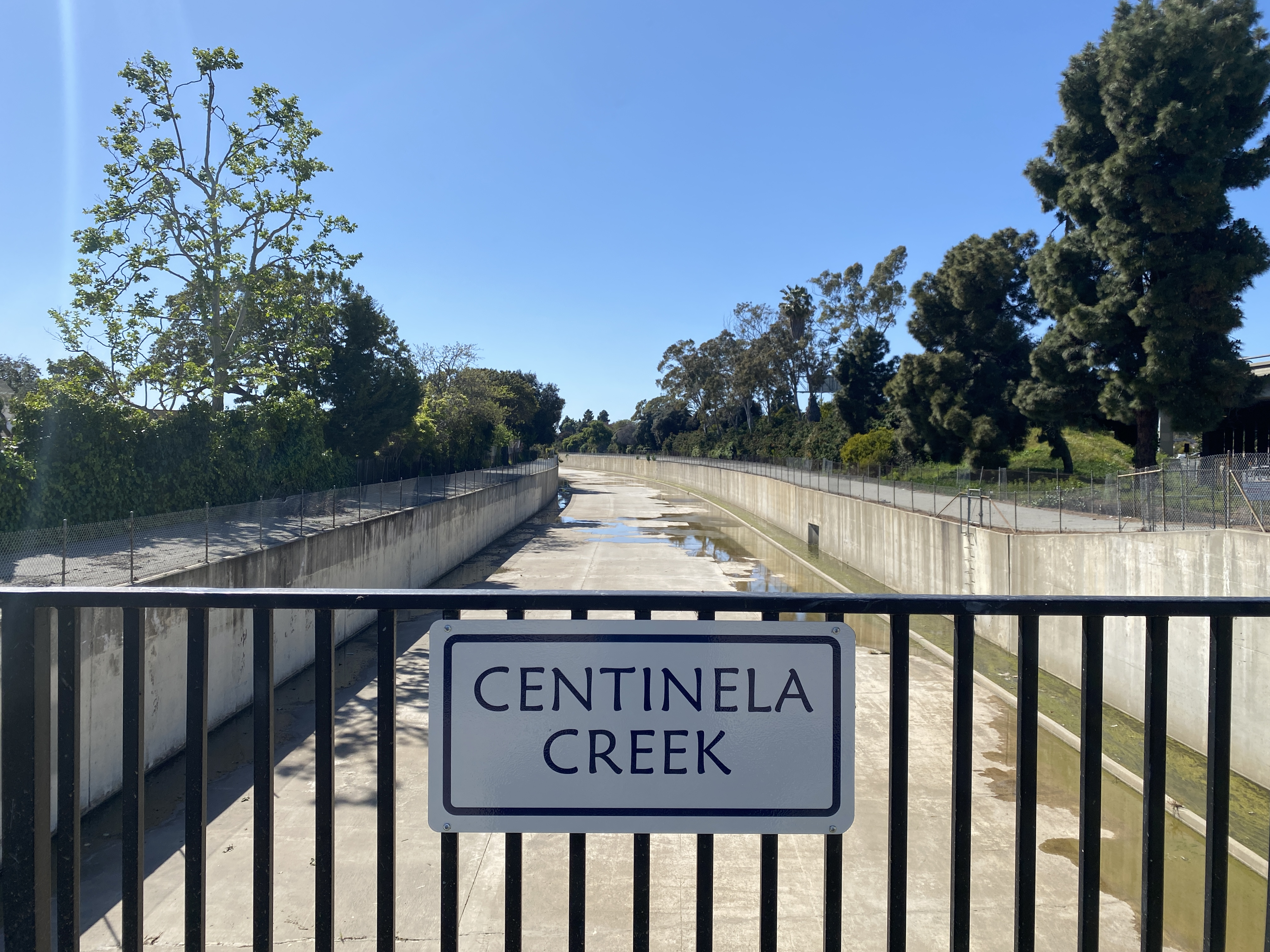
Centinela Creek, photographed from Mesmer Avenue Community Garden in 2024

Ballona Creek watershed's climate can be characterized as Mediterranean with average annual rainfall of about 409 millimeters (16 inches). Land use in the watershed is 64% residential, 17% open space, 8% commercial, and 4% industrial. The flow rate in the creek varies considerably, from a trickle flow of about 14 cubic feet (0.40 cubic metres) per second during dry weather to 71,400 cu ft (2,020 m^{3}) per second during a 50-year storm event. Note: In Los Angeles County, the "water year" is measured beginning October 1 continuing until the next September 30, rather than by calendar year.

Natural channels remain at some of the headwaters of Ballona Creek tributaries, while the lower portion of the stream is encased in concrete channels either rectangular in the east or trapezoidal toward the west; to the west of Centinela Avenue, the bottom of the creek is unpaved and subject to tidal influence.

=== Tributaries and drains ===
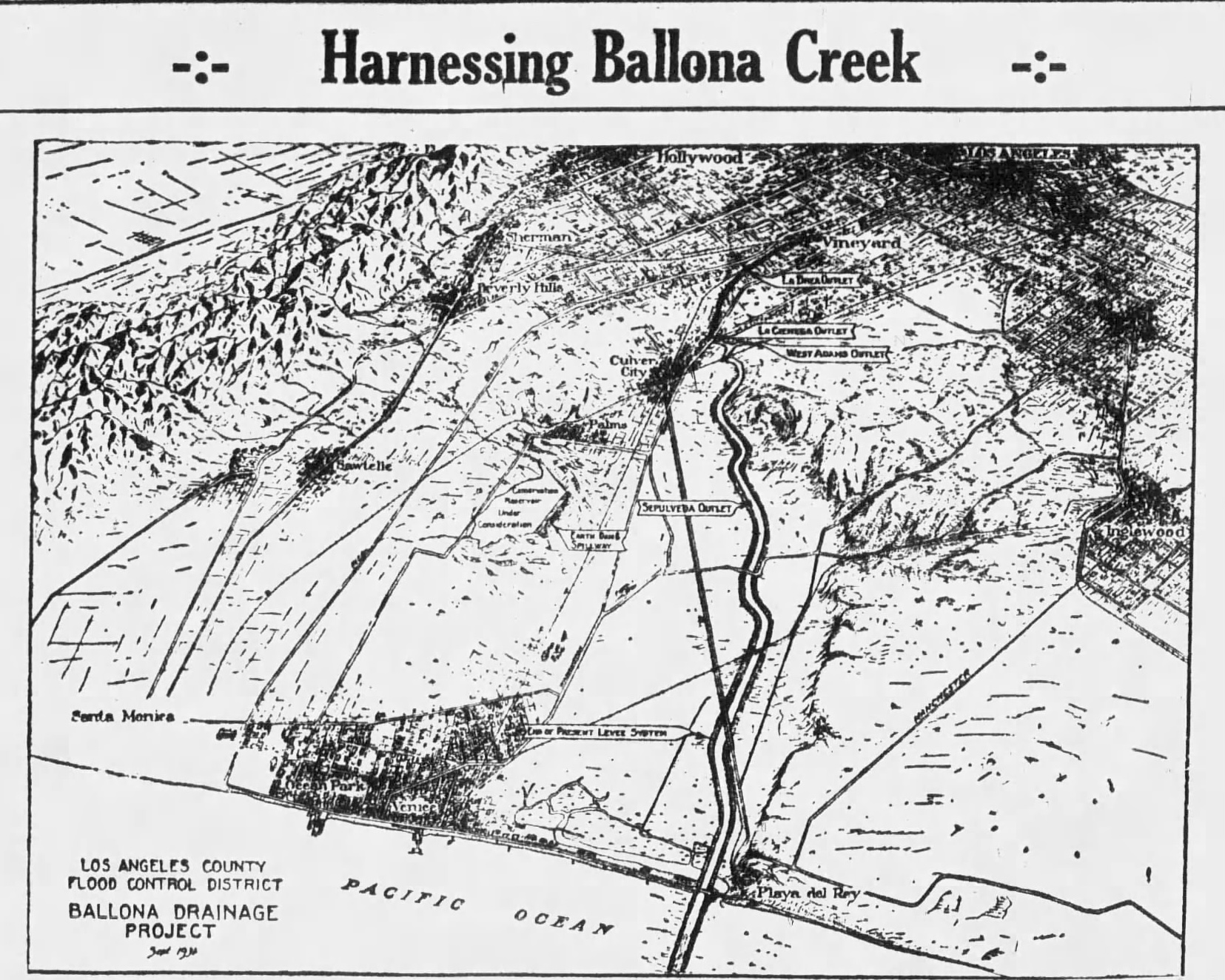
"Ballona Drainage Project, September 1934"

- Brush Canyon Creek – an intermittent stream, about 2 miles (3.2 km) long, begins in what everyone calls Bronson Canyon, roughly between the Hollywood Reservoir and Mount Hollywood, travels south, passes under Wilshire Country Club, enters the Arroyo de los Jardines, (also known as Longwood Stream and El Río del Jardín de las Flores) through the Brookside neighborhood of Hancock Park
- Arroyo de la Sacatela – Shakespeare Bridge in Franklin Hills–Los Feliz was built to cross this watercourse, which fed Bimini Slough in what is now Koreatown; infrastructure built 1929 drained a 4,200-acre (6.6 mi^{2}) area, which among other things permitted development of land below Santa Monica Boulevard between Mariposa and Kenmore
- Ferndell in Griffith Park
- Laurel Canyon Creek – an intermittent stream, about 1.5 miles (2.4 km) long, draining a small area in the Santa Monica Mountains and flowing southward into Ballona Creek through La Brea Rancho (vicinity of Fairfax/Hancock Park)
- Nichols Canyon Creek – an intermittent stream, 1.5 miles (2.4 km) long, draining a small area in the eastern part of the Santa Monica Mountains and discharging southward into Ballona Creek through La Brea Rancho
- Arroyo de Los Jardines – According to a 1937 news report, "Nearly all of the flood waters from Hollywood business and residential district eventually find their way into the Arroyo de Los Jardines channel, concentrating near Wilshire Boulevard and La Brea Avenue. The county flood control district has prepared a $361,000 plan to build a new and adequate channel for the Arroyo de Los Jardines between Wilshire and Ballona Creek. The water will pour into Ballona Creek, two blocks west of La Brea Avenue. Water from Nichols Canyon also reaches Ballona Creek by way of the Arroyo de Los Jardines."
- Dry Canyon Creek (Arroyo Seco?) – an intermittent stream, about 3.5 miles (5.6 km) long, draining a small area in the Santa Monica Mountains and flowing southeastward to San Jose de Buenos Ayres Rancho (vicinity of Westwood/Holmby Hills)
- Benedict Canyon Channel – constructed by the U.S. Army Corps of Engineers in 1961–62
  - Benedict Canyon Creek – an intermittent stream, 3.5 miles (5.6 km) long, draining a small area in the Santa Monica Mountains, and flowing southward into Rodeo de las Aguas Rancho
  - Coldwater Canyon Creek – an intermittent stream, 3–4 miles (4.8–6.4 km) long, draining a small area in the Santa Monica Mountains, and flowing southward and southeastward into Rodeo de las Aguas Rancho. Near the mouth of its canyon it receives streams draining Franklin and Higgins canyons.
    - Higgins Canyon Creek – an intermittent stream, about 2 miles (3.2 km) long
    - Franklin Canyon Creek – an intermittent stream, about 3 miles (4.8 km) long, draining a small area in the Santa Monica Mountains and flowing southward to its junction with Coldwater Canyon Creek
  - Peavine Canyon Creek – an intermittent stream, about 1.5 miles (2.4 km) long, draining a small area in the Santa Monica Mountains and flowing southward to the mouth of its canyon near what is now Beverly Hills – essentially San Ysidro Drive
- Sepulveda Canyon Creek – an intermittent stream, about 5 miles (8.0 km) long, draining a small area in the Santa Monica Mountains and flowing southeastward toward Ballona Creek; sinks north of the VA in Brentwood
  - Sawtelle-Westwood Channel, plan in 1934 was a "large conduit from Pico Boulevard to Venice Boulevard and eventually southward to Ballona Channel"; construction began 1956
  - Sepulveda Channel – sometimes called the Mar Vista drain, initial plans in 1927 were for it to begin at Midvale and Pico
    - Stone Canyon Creek – an intermittent stream, about 3 miles (4.8 km) long, draining a small area in the Santa Monica Mountains and flowing southward into Westwood – still accessible on UCLA campus between Sunset Boulevard and the Anderson School of Management
- Brown Canyon Creek – an intermittent stream, about 6.5 miles (10.5 km) long, draining a small area in the Santa Monica Mountains, and flowing east of south to a point near Palms, where its waters would sink or might feed into Ballona during particularly wet years—creek recently daylighted as part of the Westwood Greenway adjacent to Westwood/Rancho Park station
- Centinela Creek Channel – ancient waterway, channelized in mid-20th century; rises near Centinela Park (once the site of Centinela Springs); surfaces near La Tijera Boulevard, flows northwestward about 4 miles (6.4 km) to Mesmer, then follows the route of the 90 freeway until it meets Ballona Creek; before channelization and the creation of Marina del Rey, fed into Ballona Lagoon
- Adams Channel – one 1905 article about the city water supply surmised that the original course of the Los Angeles River (back before 1825, when it fed into the Ballona) was roughly along what is now Adams Boulevard. The West Adams storm drain was built in 1925 and started at Vermont Avenue – a segment of the "West Adams sewer" under construction in 1926 presented "unusual engineering difficulties, it is said, because water is found within a few feet of the surface in almost the entire territory, which extends from Angeles Mesa drive [Crenshaw Boulevard] to the end of West Adams street and on either side of that street from Washington to Jefferson streets".
- Rexford Channel
- North Culver Drain

Many of these run wholly or partially underground in storm drains that empty into the creek.

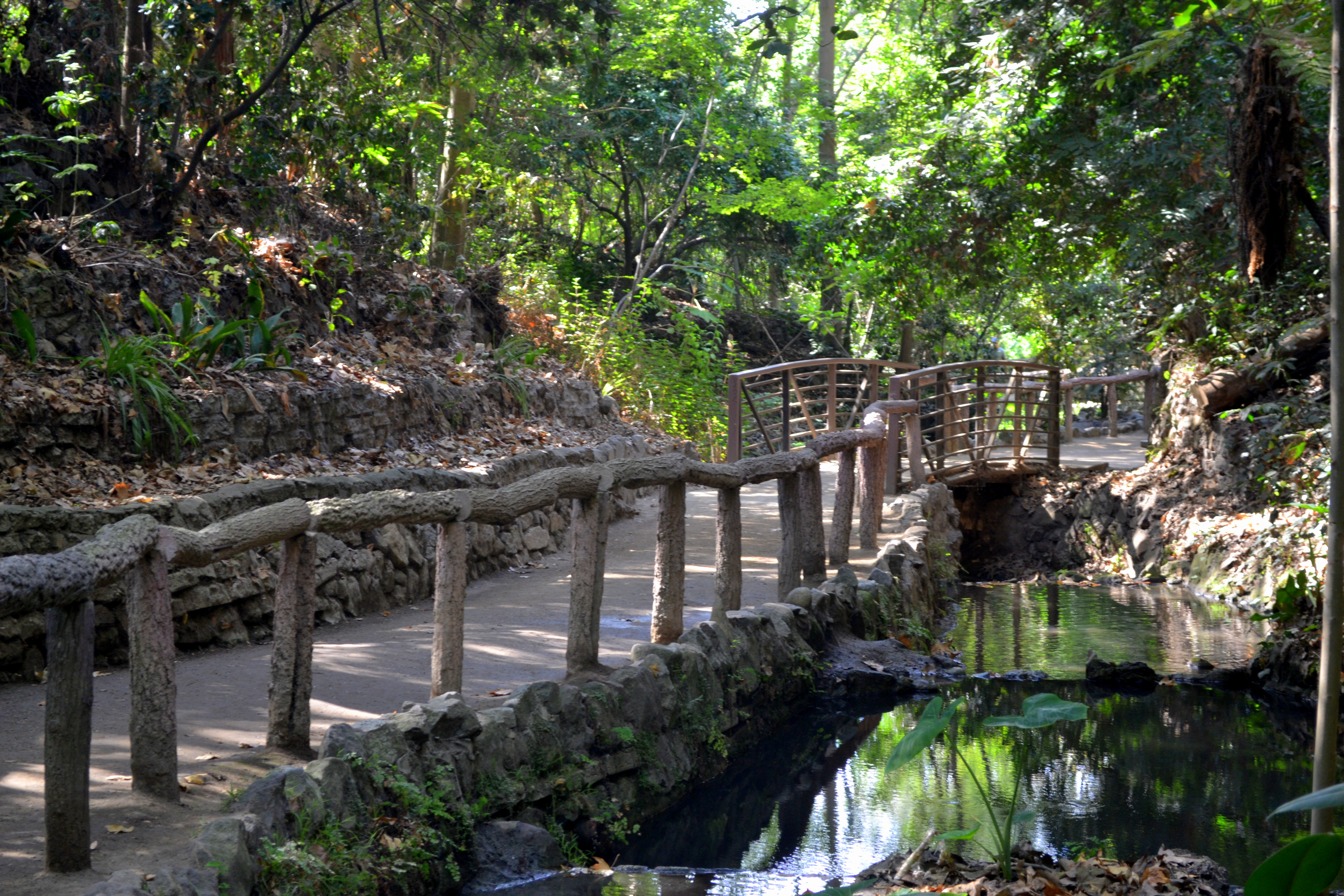
Ferndell in Griffith Park is one of the streams in the far northeastern reach of the Ballona watershed

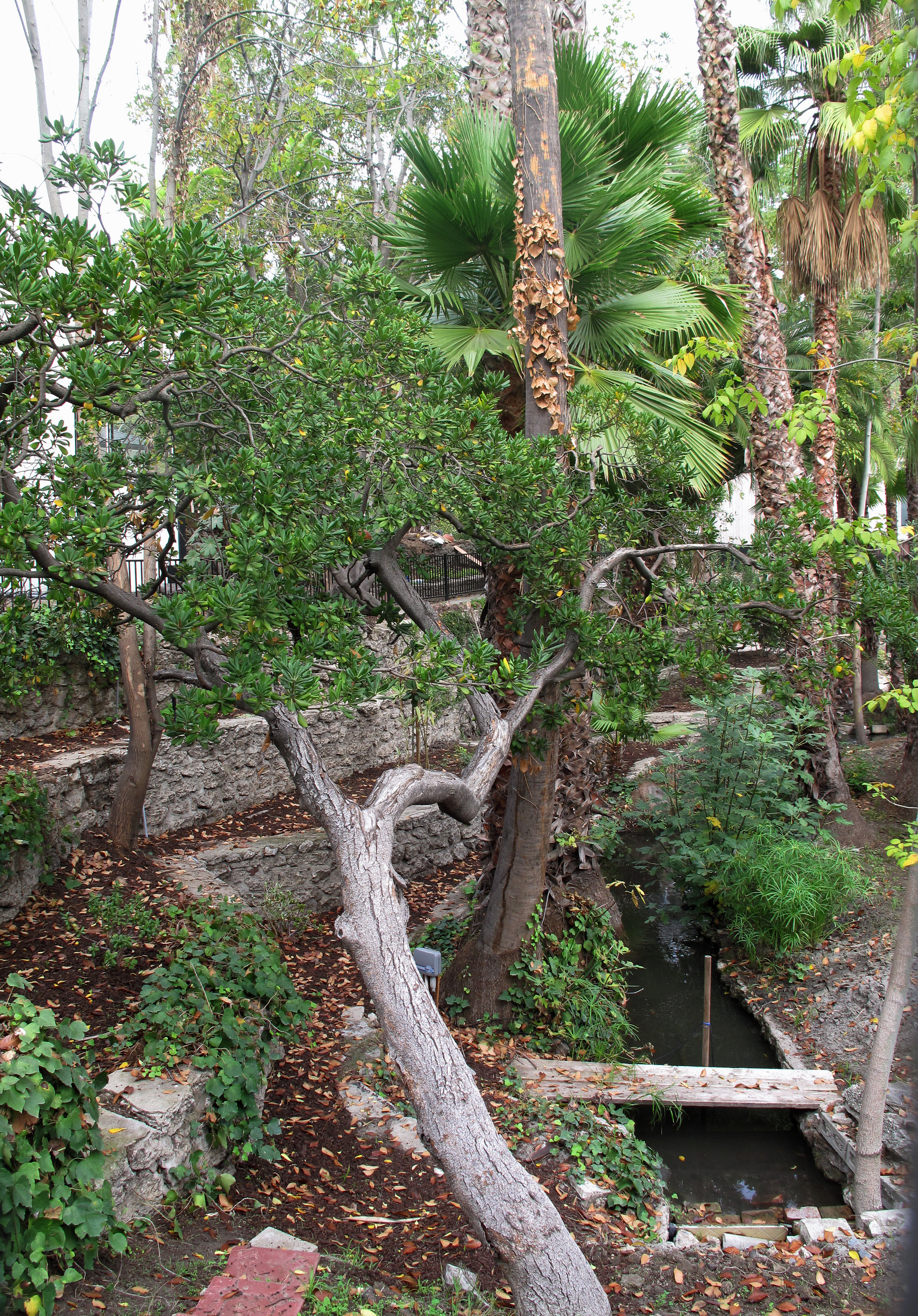
Arroyo de Los Jardines in Hancock Park

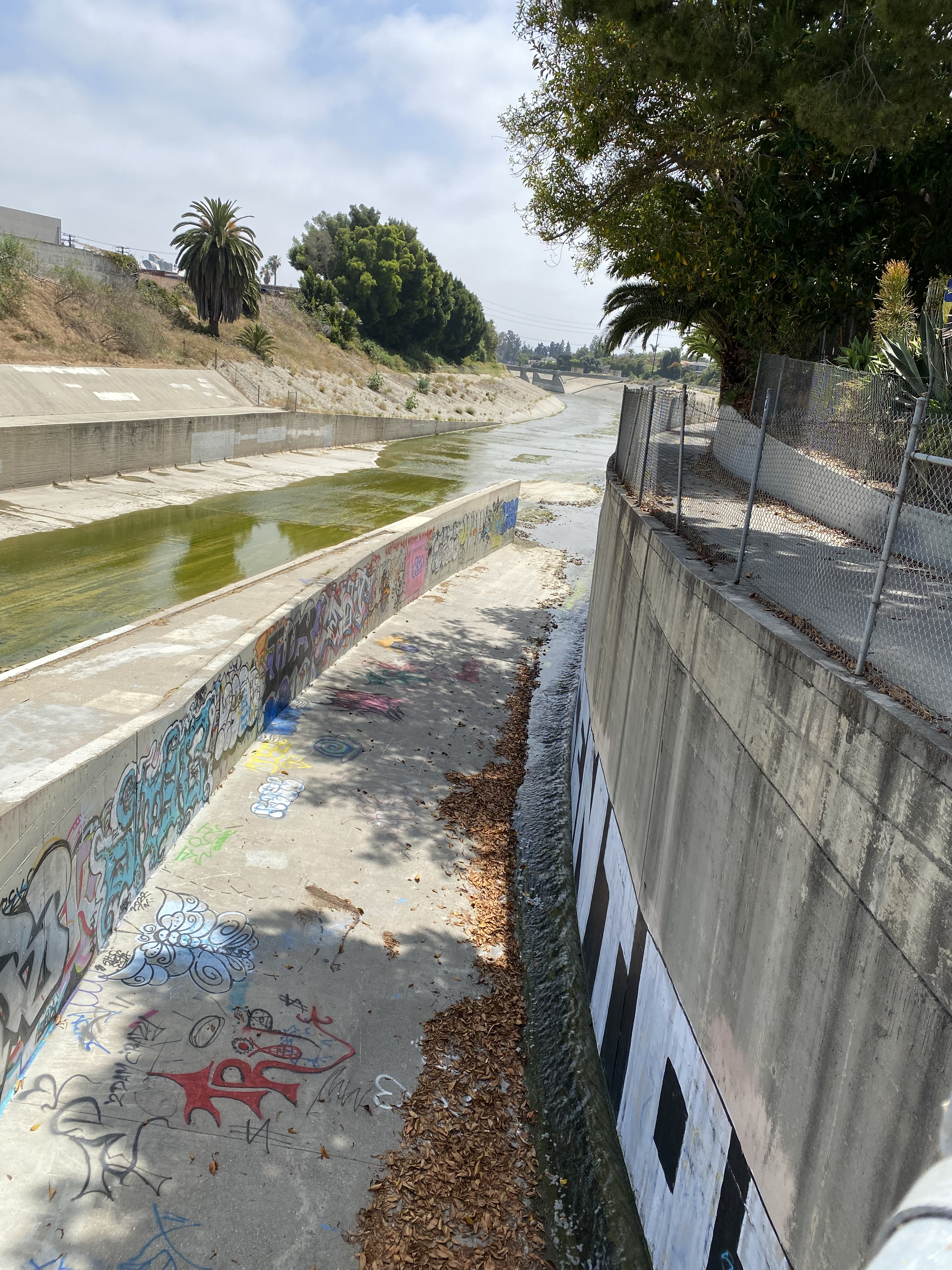
Benedict Canyon Creek Channel enters Ballona Creek

=== Additional watershed elements ===
According to a report from the Los Angeles Department of Water and Power, other contributing elements of the contemporary watershed, besides the major tributaries, are Baldwin Hills Park, Del Rey Lagoon Park, Ballona Lagoon Marine Preserve, Grand Canal, the Venice Canals, Ballona Northeast (Area C—State lands), Bluff Creek and Ballona Wetlands, Marina del Rey (including Marina Del Rey Wetland Park), and Oxford Flood Control Basin.

Ballona Wetlands, Del Rey Lagoon, Ballona Lagoon, and Oxford Basin are connected to the Ballona estuary through tide gates.

The Ballona watershed is estimated to have roughly 35% impervious surface, which affects rainwater infiltration and groundwater recharge.

There were at least 41 natural springs mapped in the Río de La Ballona watershed before development. A waterway called Walnut Creek once arose near what is now the L.A. Coliseum at Exposition, but it was destroyed by the 1930s flood-control engineering.

A 2011 study determined that as little as 2% of Ballona's water may now come from underground springs, meaning that 98% of the creek's flow consists of various forms of runoff throughout the watershed.

== Crossings ==
From northern source to southern mouth (year built in parentheses):

- Begins at South Cochran Avenue
- South Burnside Avenue (1974)
- Hauser Boulevard (1974)
- Thurman Avenue (1974)
- South Fairfax Avenue (1962)
- I-10 - Santa Monica Freeway (1964)
- La Cienega Boulevard (1937)
- Washington Boulevard (1938)
- National Boulevard north (1967), Bike Path Bridge for Expo Bike Path since 2009
- Metro E Line (2012) originally Santa Monica Air Line streetcar (1909)
- National Boulevard south (1967, replaced 2009)

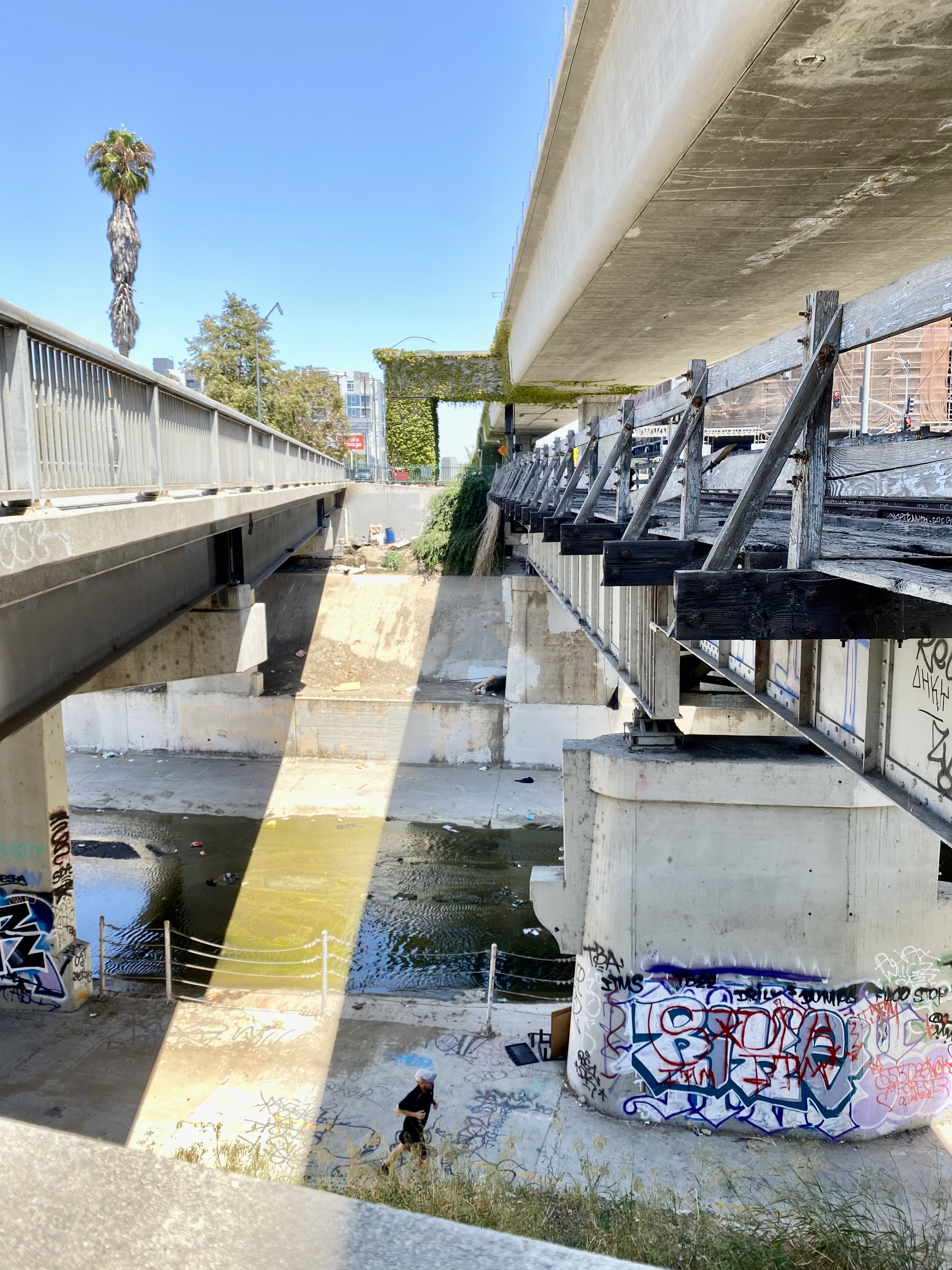
Three bridges over Ballona Creek: Expo Bike Path (formerly National Boulevard north) to the left, E Line track overhead, and long-derelict Pacific Electric Santa Monica Air Line route to the right; with bypassing jogger on Ballona Creek Bike Path below.

- Higuera Street (1938, replaced 2023)
- Duquesne Avenue (1938)
- Overland Avenue (1928)
- Ballona Creek Pedestrian Bridge (1951, replaced 2004)
- Sepulveda Boulevard (1985)
- Sawtelle Boulevard (1988)
- I-405 - San Diego Freeway (1960)
- Inglewood Boulevard (1937)
- Centinela Avenue (1938)
- SR 90 - Marina Freeway (1972)
- Venice–Inglewood streetcar and freight route (crossing removed after 1980, pylons remain circa 2022)
- SR 1 - Lincoln Boulevard (1937)
- Culver Boulevard (1937)
- Redondo Beach via Playa del Rey Line streetcar (built circa 1903, demolished sometime after 1940)
- Pacific Avenue Bridge (1928) – Now used only by pedestrians and bicycles as part of the Los Angeles Coastal Bike Trail, Pacific Avenue was once a car road continuous from Venice to Playa Del Rey, but the construction of the Marina “severed the north-south connection.”

Several of these crossings existed as “small wooden bridges” of unknown age before they were replaced in the 1930s by WPA infrastructure projects. An “old wooden bridge” was in place on Overland before 1928. A 1900 railway map appears to show Ballona Creek crossings at Inglewood, Higuera, and La Cienega, and a crossing between Alla and Alsace stations.

== Ecology and conservation ==
=== Pollution ===
Storm water and dry-weather urban runoff, both conveyed by storm drains, are the primary sources of pollution in the riverine coastal estuary. Since Ballona drains about 126 square miles (330 km^{2}) of surface area and thousands of street gutters, freeway runoffs, and industrial overflows, its highly toxic waters constitute the most serious source of pollution for Santa Monica Bay. "A new city sewer line in the 1980s alleviated some, but not all, of the problem."

The urbanization of the watershed, and associated with it the pollution of urban runoff and stormwater, has degraded the water quality in Ballona Creek and its estuary. Ballona Creek is listed by the Los Angeles Regional Water Quality Control Board impaired for fecal coliform, heavy metals, and pesticides.

The litter flows into the creek require constant cleanup by the County Department of Public Works and volunteer teams. Fifty bags of litter, including diapers, syringes, and a car bumper, were removed from Ballona Creek on Coastal Cleanup Day in 1988. Two abandoned live kittens along with 67,000 pounds (30,000 kg) of dumped garbage were removed in 2002. Nets and booms strung across the end of the creek attempt to catch as much litter as possible before it enters Santa Monica Bay.

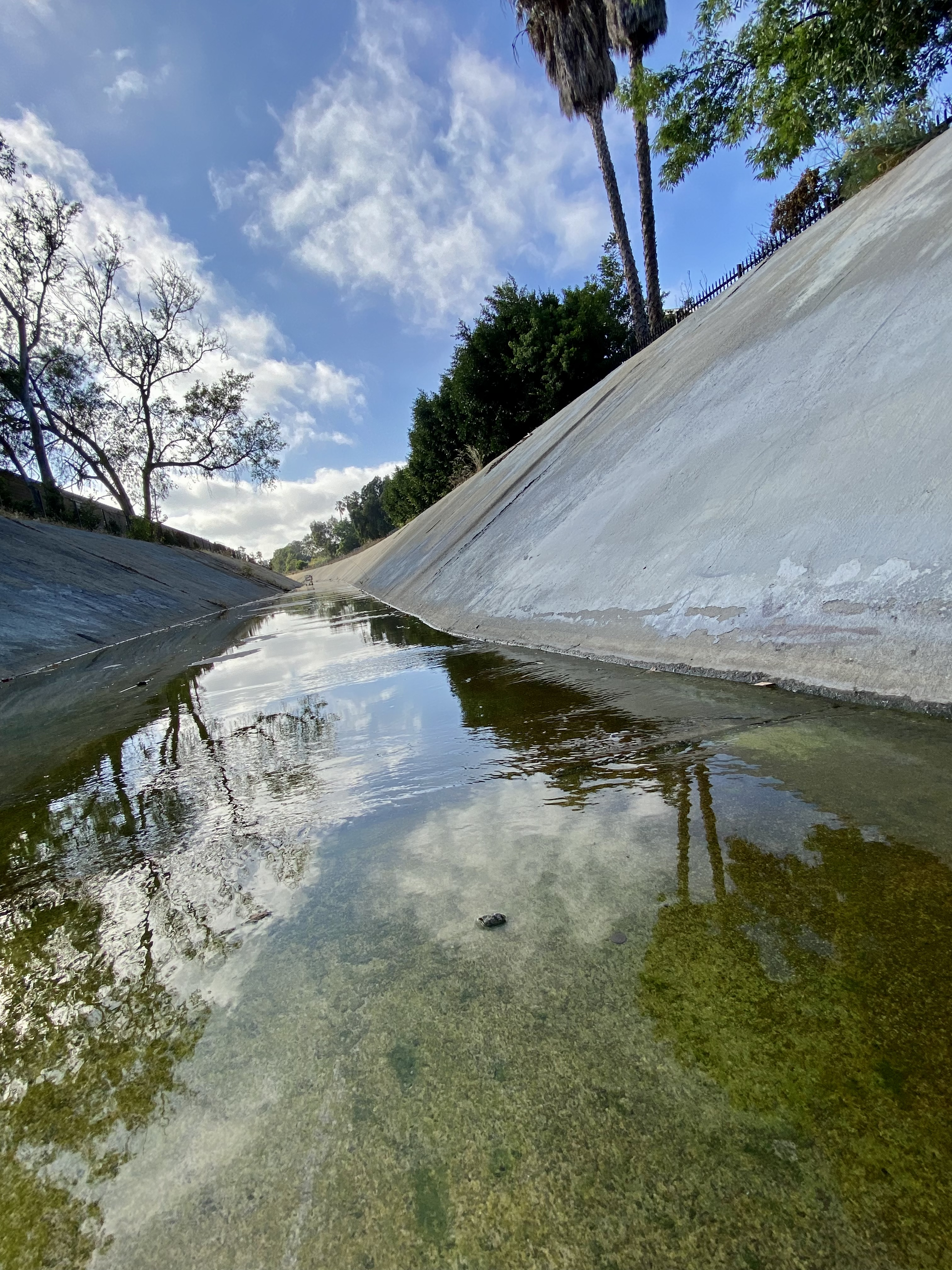
Above-ground “headwaters” of Ballona tributary Centinela Creek, near La Cienega Boulevard (click and zoom to see shopping cart)

Grocery-store carts and trash litter [Ballona Creek], joined by flotillas of foam-plastic cups after rainstorms.

— Jane Engle, Los Angeles Times

Another observer described the general state of the creek in 2021:

What little water there is flows heavy with trash and the rainbow glints of motor oil…Graffiti lines every overpass. Water, flowing from god-knows-where above, leaks yellow-green across the street. Mountains of collected dross mark an impromptu home… This place has a sort of decaying beauty, like the moody ruins of a romanticist oil painting. As the miles roll by nature slowly returns. Brush lines the creek, and I catch a pelican diving into the water mid-flight.

==== Trash Interceptor ====
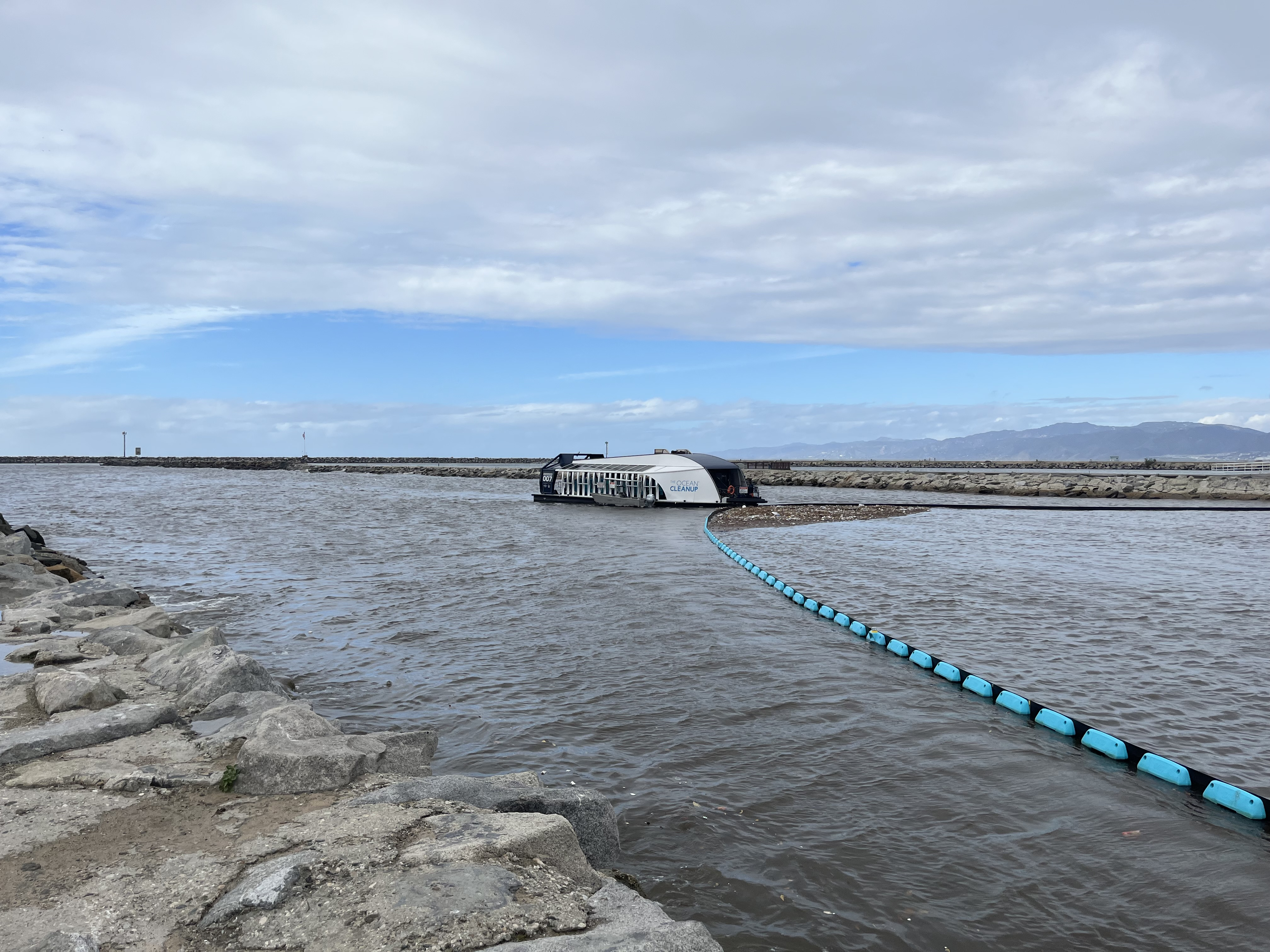
The Ocean Cleanup's Interceptor Original 007, shown at the mouth of Ballona Creek looking northwest

LA County Public Works deployed an Interceptor Original, an automated solar-powered system made by the Dutch nonprofit The Ocean Cleanup, near the mouth of the creek in October 2022. This is the first Interceptor Original installed in the United States, and the second of the third-generation Interceptor Original to be deployed globally. Until the system was put into place, it was docked with the United States Coast Guard in Long Beach, California. One boom on the device was damaged in the 2022–2023 storms, but the main unit was not damaged.

After completing its two-year pilot program in October 2024, the Los Angeles County Board of Supervisors voted unanimously to permanently install the trash interceptor in the creek. During those two years, the system captured nearly 124 tons of total material, twice the anticipated amount. It underwent maintenance and received upgrades to its solar panels and batteries before being reinstalled in time for the 2024 winter storm season.

=== Habitat ===
The watershed as a whole, which stretches from the Skirball Center to Griffith Park (south of the SM Mountains ridgeline) down past Echo Park to south Los Angeles, then back past the Baldwin Hills, over to the coast between Ocean Park and Playa Del Rey, supports an estimated 3,000 species of flora, fauna, and fungi. All told, the Ballona watershed hosts over 300 bird species, 7 amphibians, 30 kinds of reptiles, almost 40 mammals, more than 200 kinds of fungi (including lichens), more than 100 arachnids, and at least 1,000 insects.

The creek and wetlands are specifically recognized as an "Important Birding Area" by the Audubon Society. As far as the creek proper, the best birding opportunities are usually west of Lincoln Boulevard. Urban coyotes and a small population of venomous southern Pacific rattlesnakes live alongside the creek; visitors should exercise due caution to protect both the wildlife and themselves. According to a 2003 assessment, "Less than one percent of the plant cover observed along the Ballona Creek could be classified as native species."

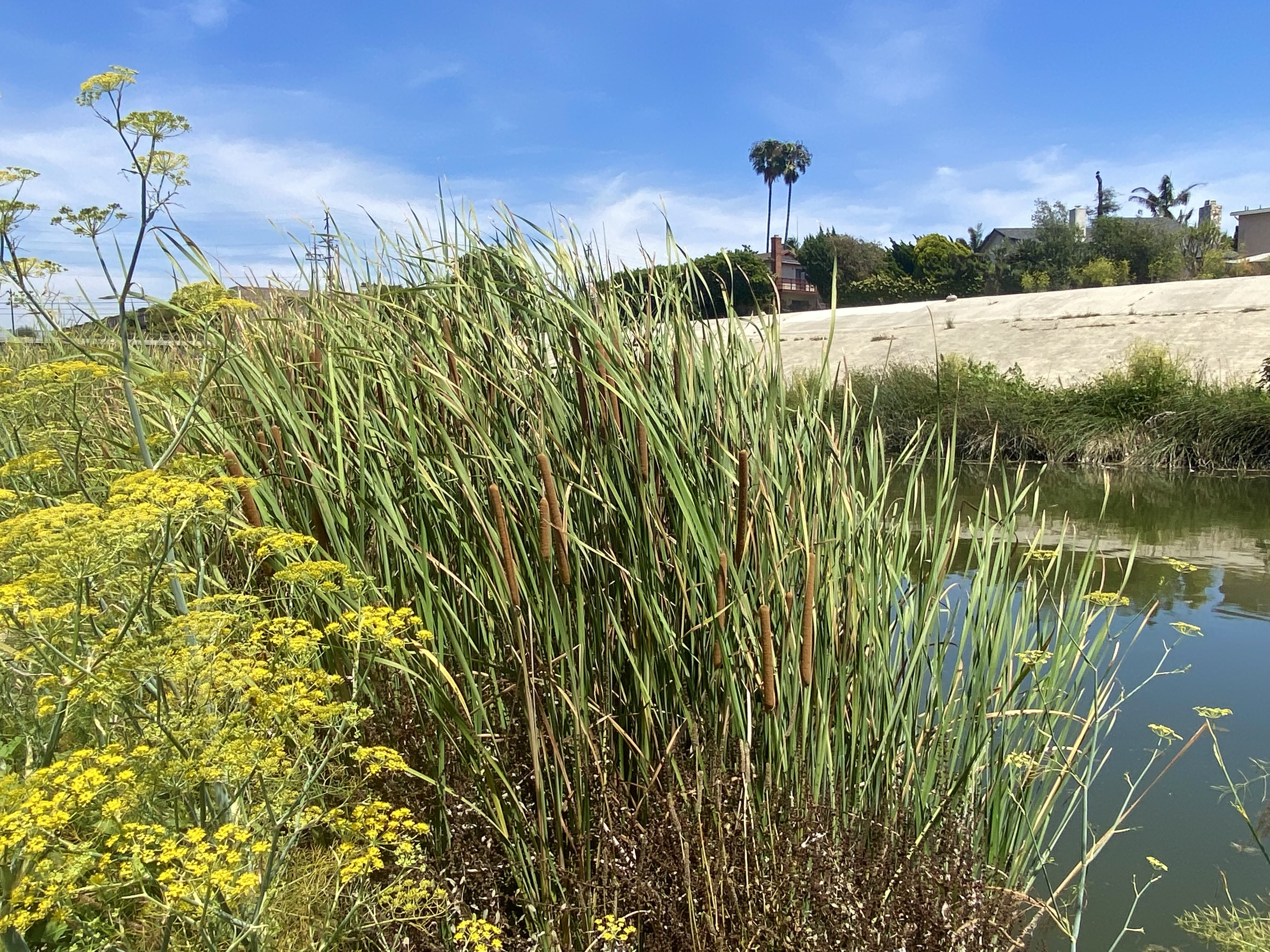
Vegetation grows creekside between Centinela and McConnell Avenues

Bottlenose dolphins, harbor seals, and California sea lions are occasionally spotted downstream. In 1953, a 350-pound (160 kg) sea lion made it 3.5 miles (5.6 km) upstream before it got bogged down; the lost pinniped was lassoed by rescuers and returned to the Pacific.

== History ==
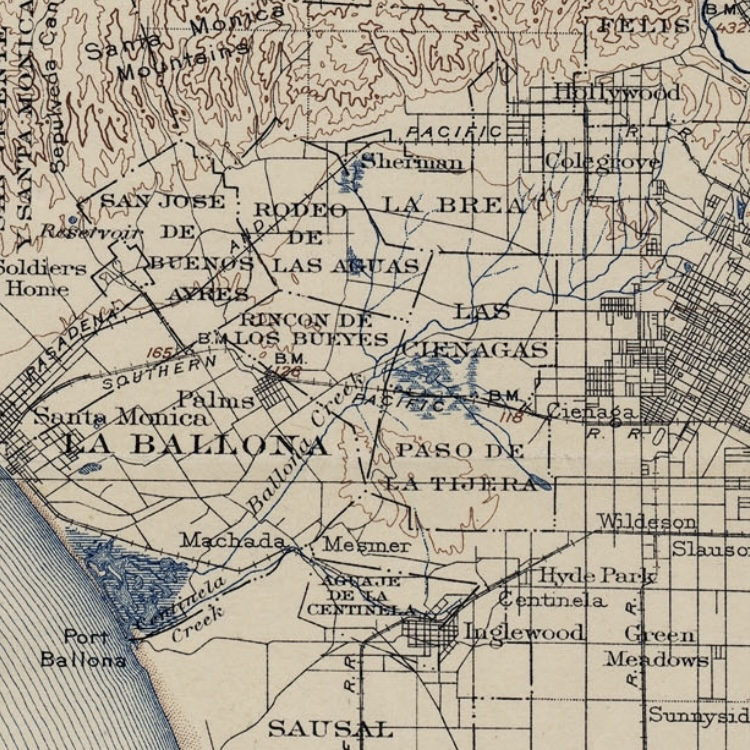
Ballona watershed, 1900

A reported Tongva-language (Takic subgroup of Uto-Aztecan) placename for the Ballona estuary and wetlands was Pwinukipar, meaning "it is filled with water". An alternative historic Spanish-language name for the creek reported in the GNIS is Sanjón de Agua con Alisos, which roughly translates to “water ditch with sycamores”. (Aliso is the North American Spanish language word for Platanus racemosa, or Western sycamore, a landmark water-loving, river-bank tree species native to the area. Watercourses or irrigation channels called zanja, zanjón, or sanjon are noted throughout southern California and the American Southwest generally.)

Ballona Creek was a picturesque natural waterway fed by runoff. The creek collected water from ciénegas and rain. Its banks were lined with sycamores, willows, tules, and other trees. This natural bounty attracted the earliest known human inhabitants of the region, the Gabrieliño-Tongva Indians, the indigenous people of the Los Angeles region. For at least 3,000 years, the pre-Contact Tongva lived in the area encompassing the Ballona Creek floodplain and the Westchester Bluffs. These indigenous peoples left a large burial ground near the region along the southwest corner of the Ballona Wetlands near the village of Guashna, alternatively spelled Washna. The records of the San Gabriel Mission record recruitment of Tongva from a group of settlements named Washna (also referred to in some historical and scholarly sources as Saa’angna) near the mouth of Ballona Creek. Before the Spanish conquest, Washna was probably the most important Native American center for trade between the mainland and Catalina Island.

The Spanish Portolá expedition camped at the headwaters of Ballona on August 3, 1769.

At the time of Spanish settlement, Ballona Creek was a distributary of the Los Angeles River. However, the flood of 1825 changed the course of the Los Angeles River, and Ballona Creek became a distinct waterway.

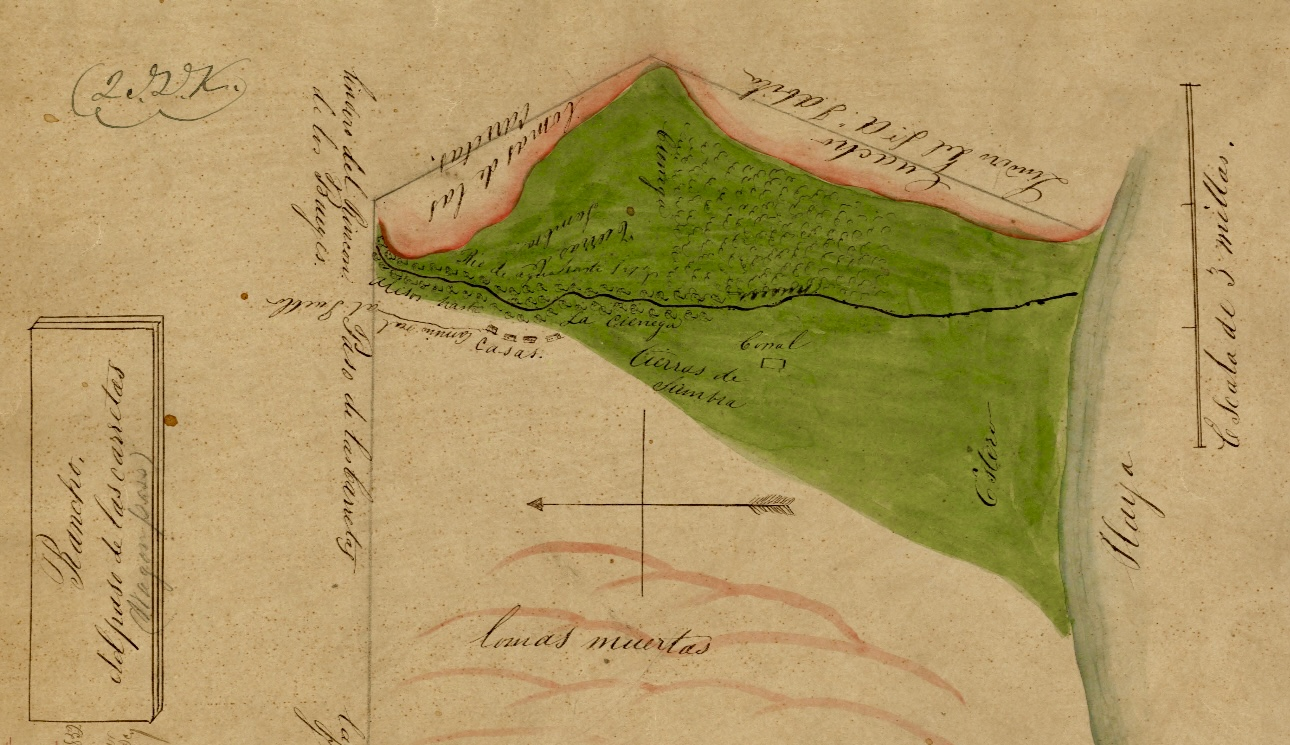
Creek and bluffs visible in original diseño for the rancho

Around 1820, a mestizo rancher named Augustine Machado claimed a 14,000-acre (57 km^{2}) Mexican land grant that stretched from modern-day Culver City to Pico Boulevard in Santa Monica, California. Ballona Creek and Lagoon are named for the Ballona or Paseo de las Carretas ("wagon pass") land grant, dated November 27, 1839. The Machado and Talamantes families, co-grantees of the rancho, heralded from Baiona in northern Spain.

In the 1840s, Francisco Higuera's adobe was "close enough to La Ballona Creek for Francisco's nine children to swim in the clear waters of the stream with its fine sandy bottom."

From 1861 to 1862, the creek was home to a U.S. Army staging ground. Several soldiers posted to Camp Latham described the local vistas, including "Charley" in May 1862 in the Trinity Journal:

After a walk of seven hours the main body of the detachment reached Camp Latham, and no one who has ever been here can deny but that it is the finest-situated camp and drill ground in the State. The camp is situated on an eminence, one hundred yards from which flows a beautiful stream of sparkling water, about the size of main Weaver Creek, lined with a dense grove of sycamores, and in the immediate vicinity of camp is a pretty grove of willows, planted tastefully by an old Spaniard, and which is beginning to form a pleasant retreat for the inhabitants of the neighborhood, and the troops at this point.

In 1886, a California state report described Ballona and Centinela creeks:

Out from the central springs of the upper belt—on ranchos La Brea and Rodeo de las Aguas—Ballona gathers its upper perennial waters, leads them south against the base of the Centinela hills. Here, reinforced by a little stream from the east, draining the springs of the ranchos La Cienega and Paso de la Tejera, it turns west and southwest, parallel with the hill’s footing, into the Ballona flats and the sea five to six miles away.

Around 1890, the renowned Machado ranch stables were located "a few hundred feet across the Ballona bridge on Overland Avenue."

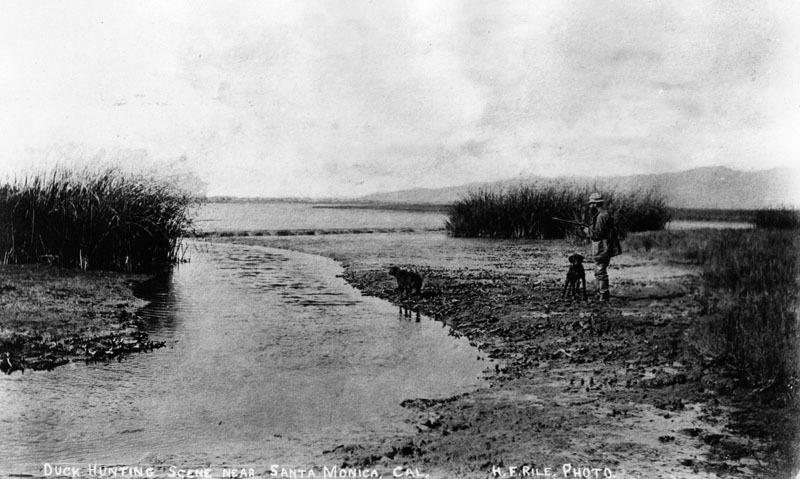
Duck hunting on the Ballona lowlands, 1890

A 1912 advertisement for homes in the “Washington Park subdivision” along the creek said, “Ballona Creek is a swift-running little stream, fed by springs, and carrying plenty of water all the year. It divides in Washington Park, making a picturesque little island.” In addition to other festivities organized by real-estate brokers to drum sales in the new development, “A free luncheon with hot coffee was served on Ballona Island, the wooded island in Ballona Creek.”

The ranch land along the creek was put into agricultural use alongside new small towns such as Venice (est. 1905) and Culver City (est. 1917). In 1928, one writer observed, “Gradually Rancho La Ballona began to develop and people began to build. The ranches were subdivided until Rancho la Ballona became a rich valley of beautiful homes with people coming from every State until it reaches the portions of today.”

Photos of a flooded Jefferson Boulevard appeared in the newspaper after a major storm in December 1931; authorities told reporters that Ballona Creek's peak flow “more than 7000 second feet” went through the channel. Deadly floods in 1934 led officials to temporarily close “small wooden bridges spanning Ballona Creek” to limit potential danger to civilians. The crossings were at Burnside Avenue, Redondo Boulevard, Thurman Avenue, and Venice Boulevard.

Much of the above-ground section of the creek was lined with concrete as part of the flood-control project undertaken by the United States Army Corps of Engineers between 1935 and 1939.

In 1931, the Los Angeles County Flood Control District had proposed permanent improvement of the Ballona Channel and included it in its county-wide flood control program. ¶ Subsequently, under the direction of Engineer C.H. Howell, a plan for La Ballona’s improvement was submitted to the federal government. ¶ Major Theodore Wyman Jr. sent his hundreds of workers to straighten and widen the crooked channel that since prehistoric times had been unable to hold the flood waters of rainy seasons that created lagoons and created vast swamp areas. ¶ They not only straightened, widened and deepened the meandering river, they put it in slope-sided, rock-lined strait-jacket. Also they built three bridges, with the aid of a federal grant of $800,000. ¶ The result has been increased flood protection to a wide area and the reclaiming of swamp land. In addition there has been created an estuary, formed by the flow of ocean tides, extending two miles inland from the channel mouth.

Two laborers, Tony Rizzo, a 44-year-old father of six, and Barney Porres, 24, were killed by a mudslide in the channel in 1937. Two other men were injured. A coroner's jury found that “lack of proper precautions” by flood-control management team were to blame.

A contract was awarded in 1946 to extend the stone jetties an additional 550 feet (170 m) “to deflect ocean currents to prevent beach erosion.”

The tributaries were channelized in the 1950s. Centinela Creek's course was set in parallel to the route of Interstate 405 and the then-forthcoming Marina Freeway. The channelization of the creek is part of the larger human reorganization of southern California hydrology, “some of the oldest and most extensive water redistribution projects in the United States.”

When the Baldwin Hills Dam broke 1963, the Ballona Creek Channel carried the flood of water and debris safely to the sea.

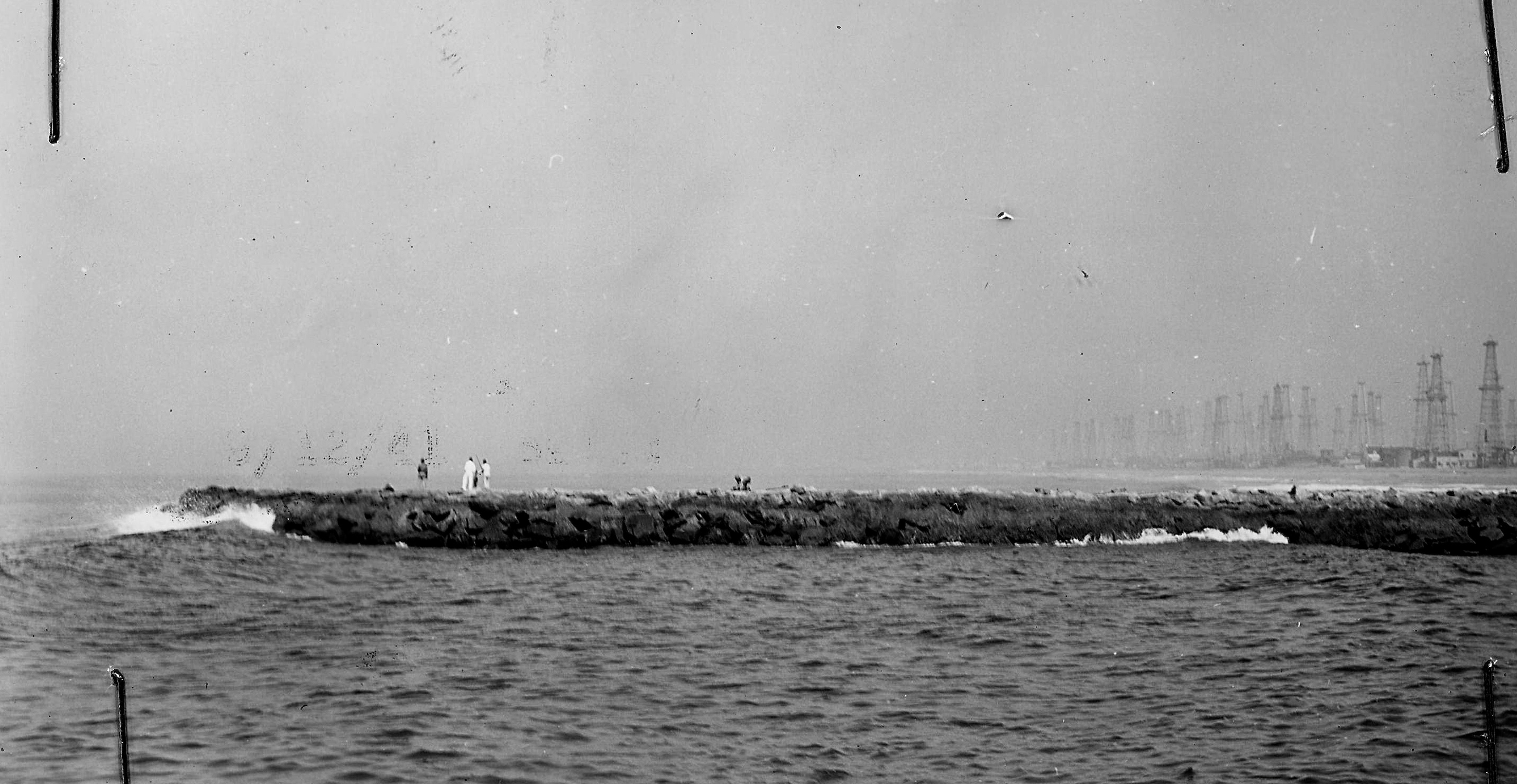
1942 Ballona Creek

== Recreation ==
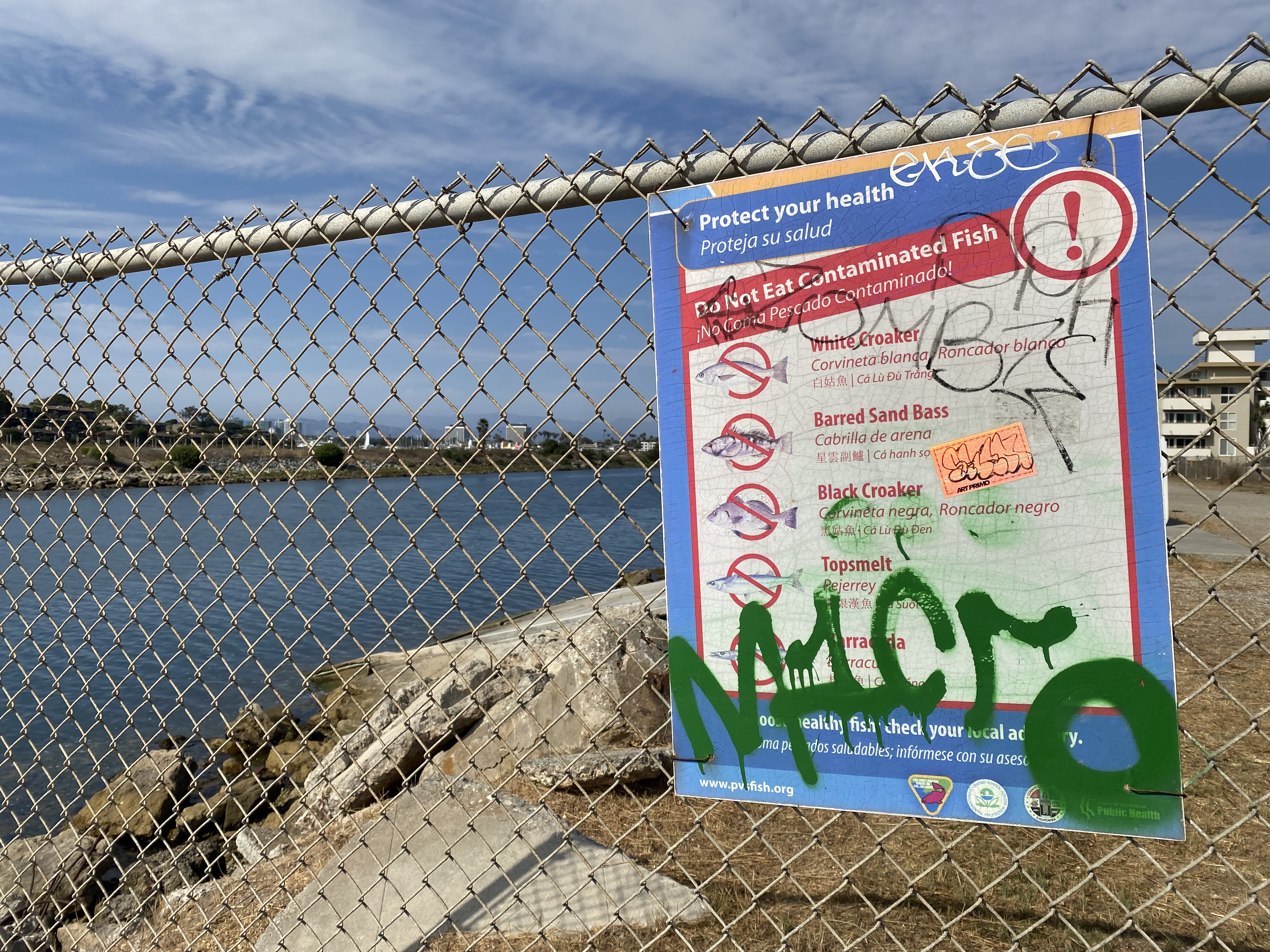
Multilingual sign warning of five species of contaminated fish in Ballona Creek

The Ballona Creek Bike Path, which extends almost 7 miles (11 km) from National Boulevard in Culver City to Marina Del Rey, is a popular fitness track. Running along a combination of existing flood-control service roadways and purpose-built paths, it is a fully grade-separated trail, permitting cyclists to ride the entire length without signals or road crossings. However, the path is closed during major rainstorms, as portions running beneath bridges are often fully submerged when water levels are high.

More than 30 species of fish are present in the Ballona Del Rey harbor and Ballona estuary. The Ballona Wetlands Land Trust offers a free, full-color, online booklet “A Guide to Fish Found in the Lower Ballona Creek and the Ballona Wetlands”. The Los Angeles Department of Beaches and Harbors permits licensed fishing at the north and south jetties; licenses can be purchased at nearby shops (West Marine, Marina Del Rey Sportfishing or Del Rey Landing). The Ballona Creek jetty is “a good spot for kelp bass, sand bass, and mackerel.” Due to the contaminated nature of the creek ecosystem, warnings are often posted of species of fish which are unsafe for human consumption.

In 1950, an upstream reservoir was being drained by Los Angeles, and “Bass and blue gill, stocked in the reservoir, ran down storm drains and into Ballona Creek.” The Culver City Chamber of Commerce and Hughes Aircraft Rod & Gun Club erected a temporary dam to trap the fish and threw a fishing contest for local kids. (No adults allowed.)

== In popular culture ==
The Little Rascals of Hal Roach’s Our Gang used Ballona Creek as a filming location for shorts like “Fish Hooky” (1933).

In the 1997 movie Volcano, Mike Roark (Tommy Lee Jones) destroys a 20-story apartment building in a controlled demolition in order to divert a flowing river of lava into Ballona Creek and thus into the Pacific Ocean.

== Gallery ==
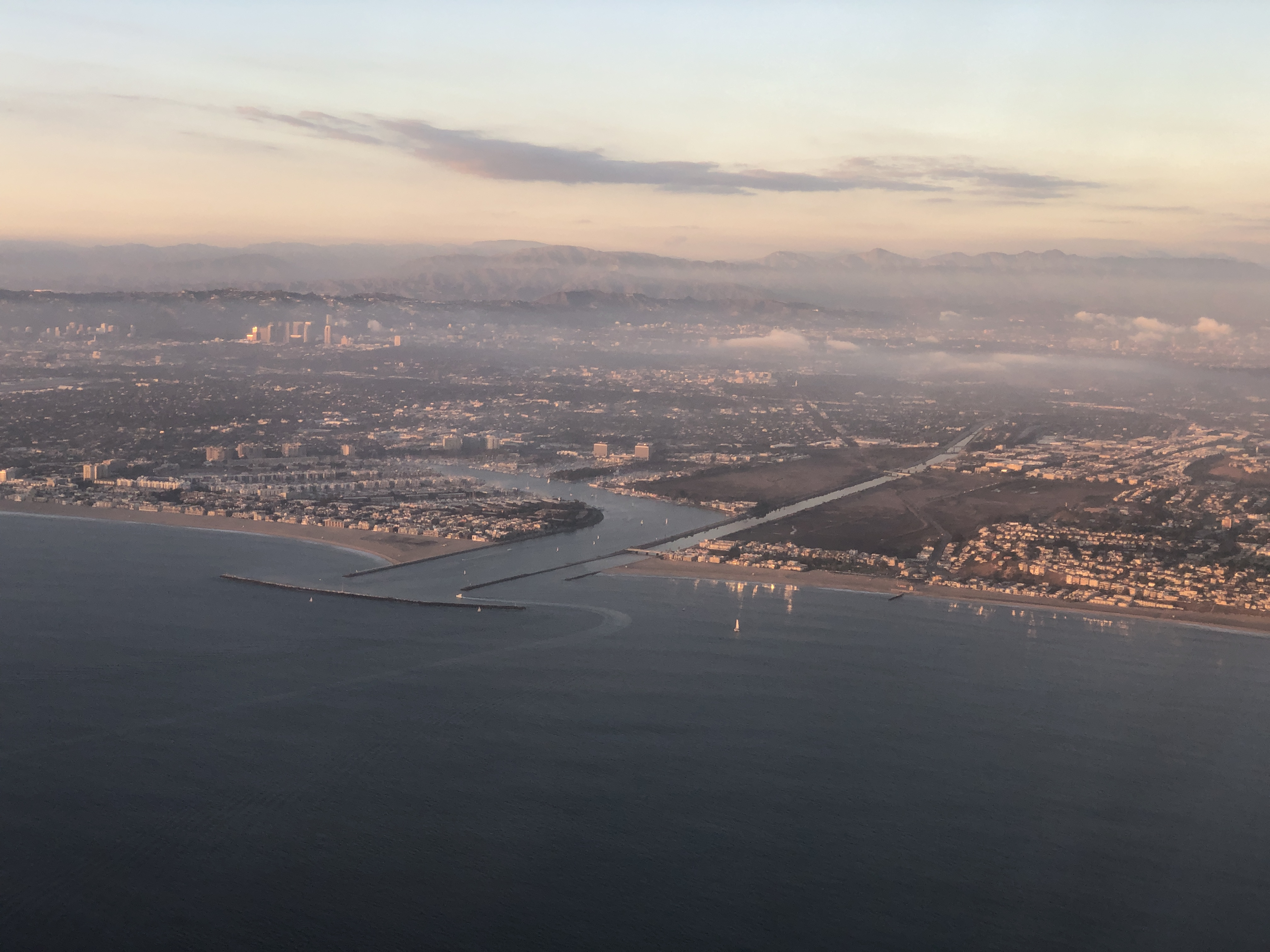
Mouth of Ballona Creek and Ballona Wetlands, between Marina Del Rey and Playa Del Rey

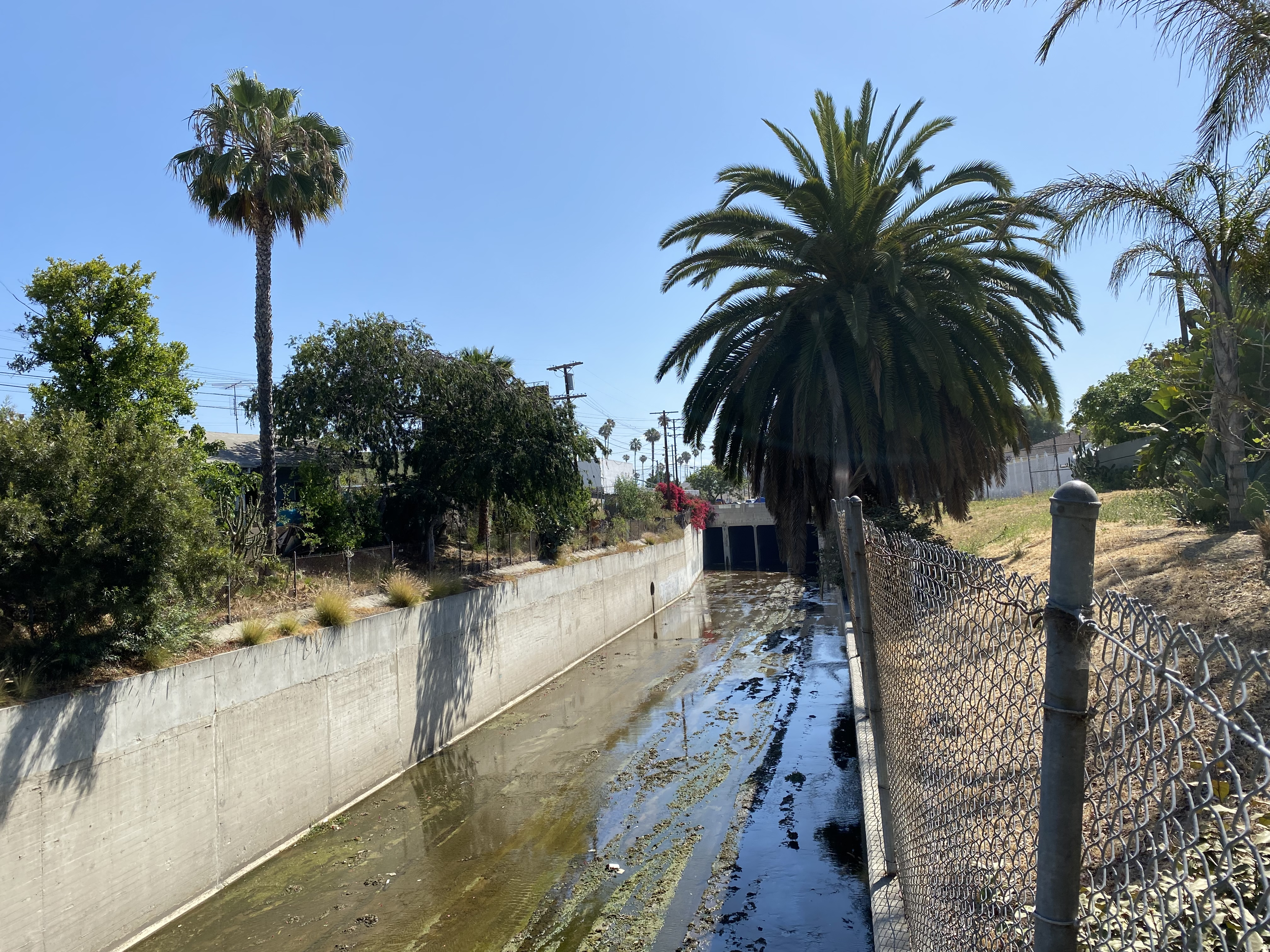
Above-ground origin point in the Mid-City neighborhood

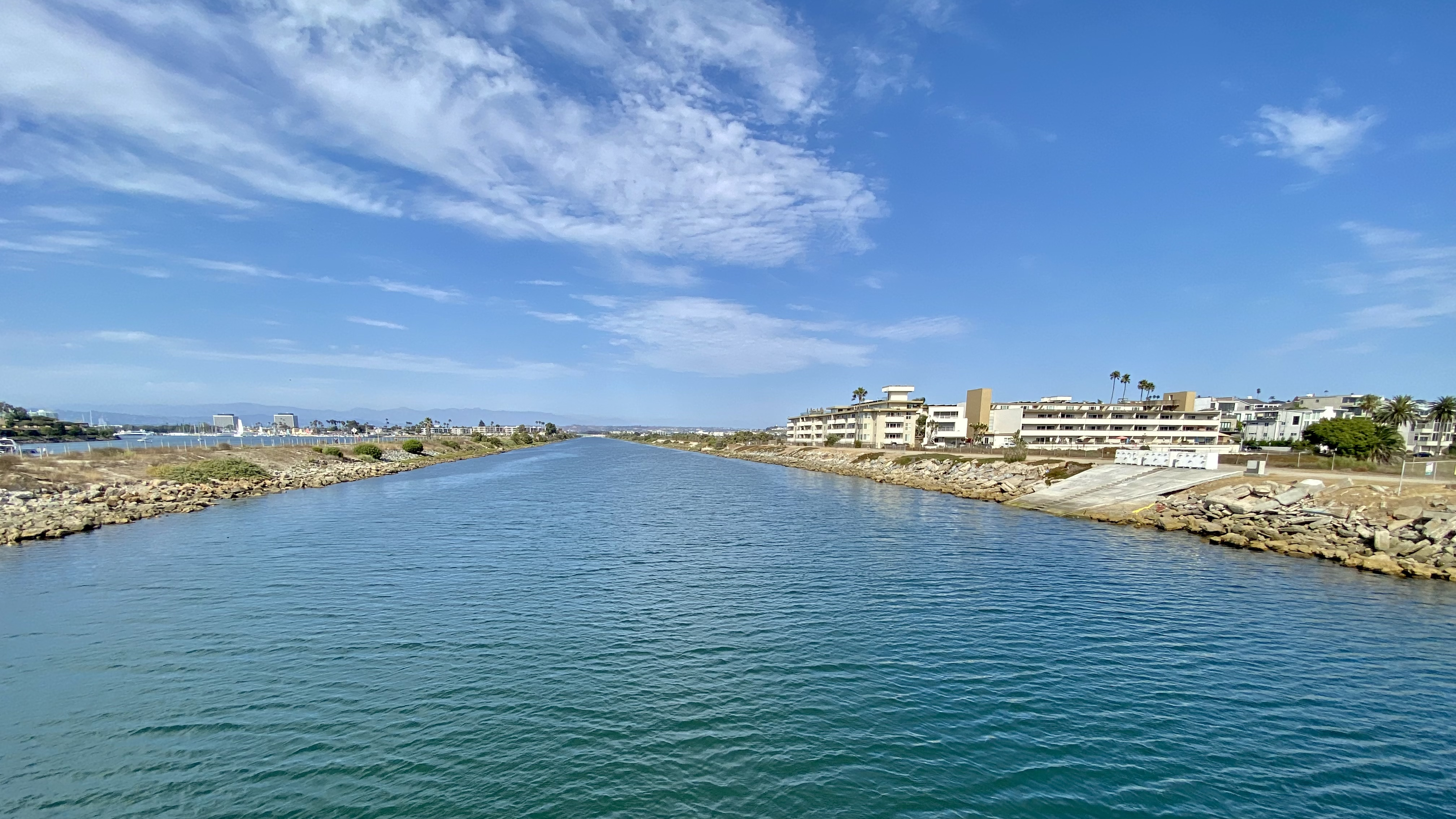
Near the mouth of the river, from Pacific Avenue Bridge

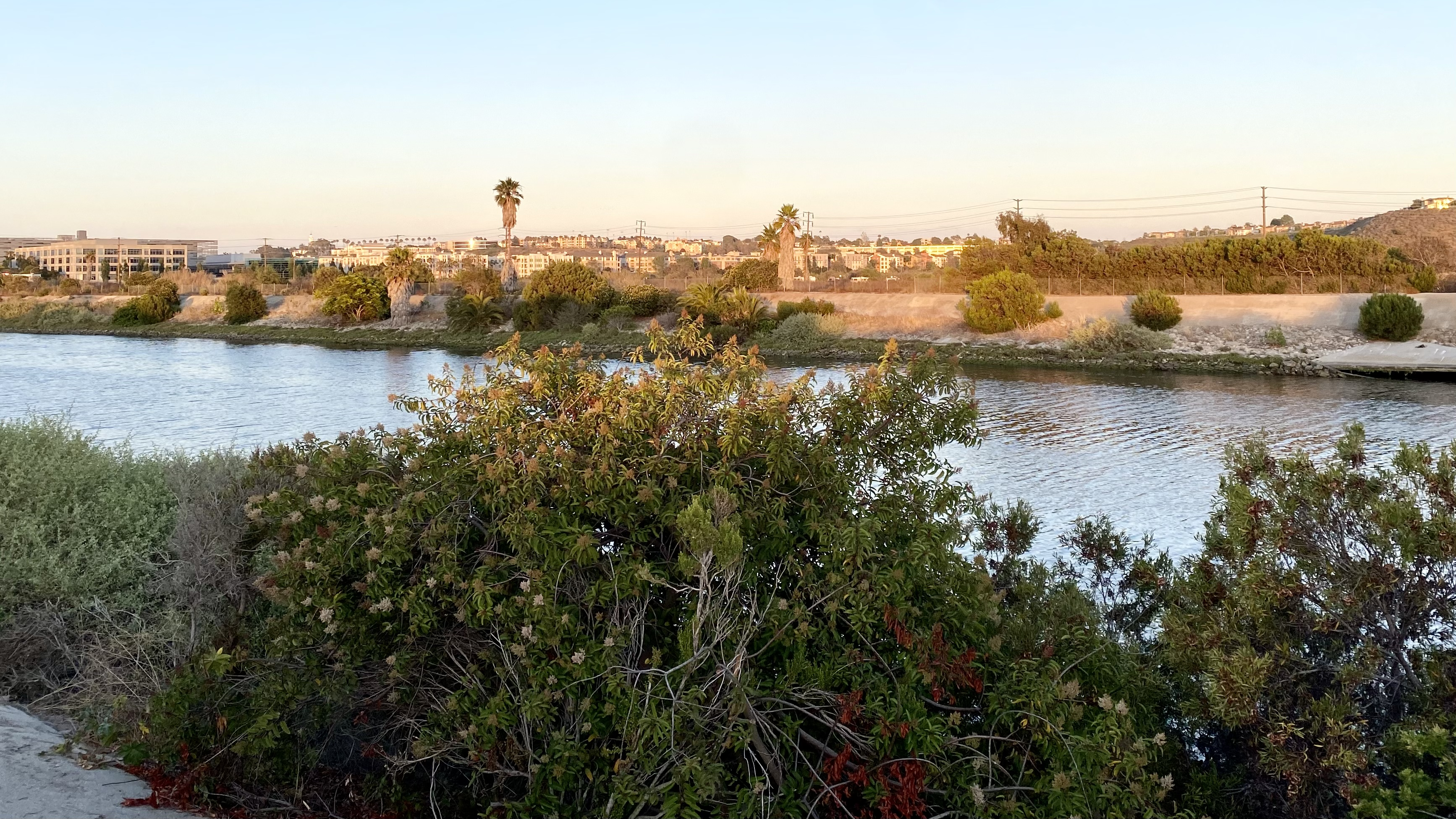
Ballona Creek looking toward Playa Vista

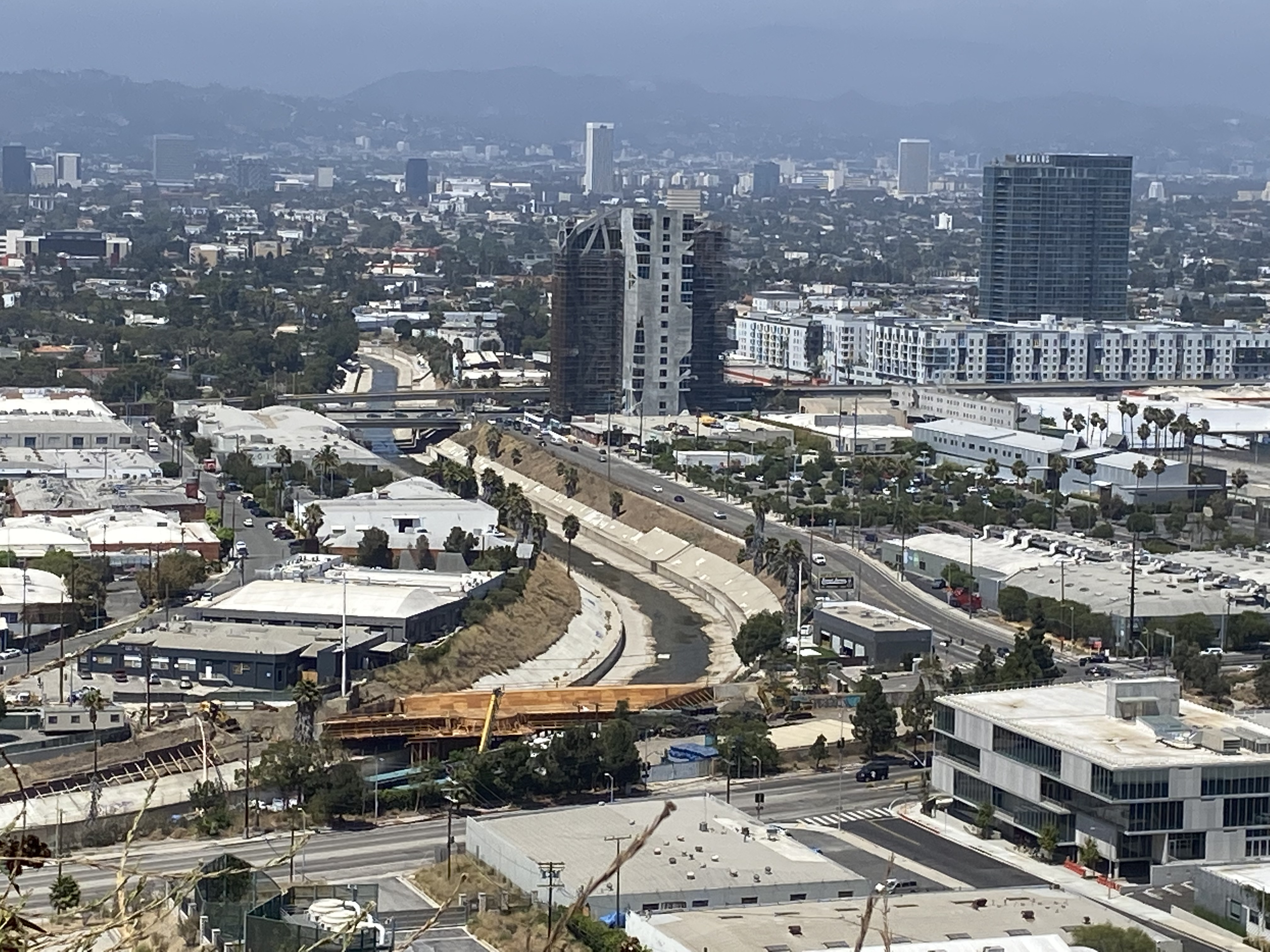
Eastern end of creek near La Cienega

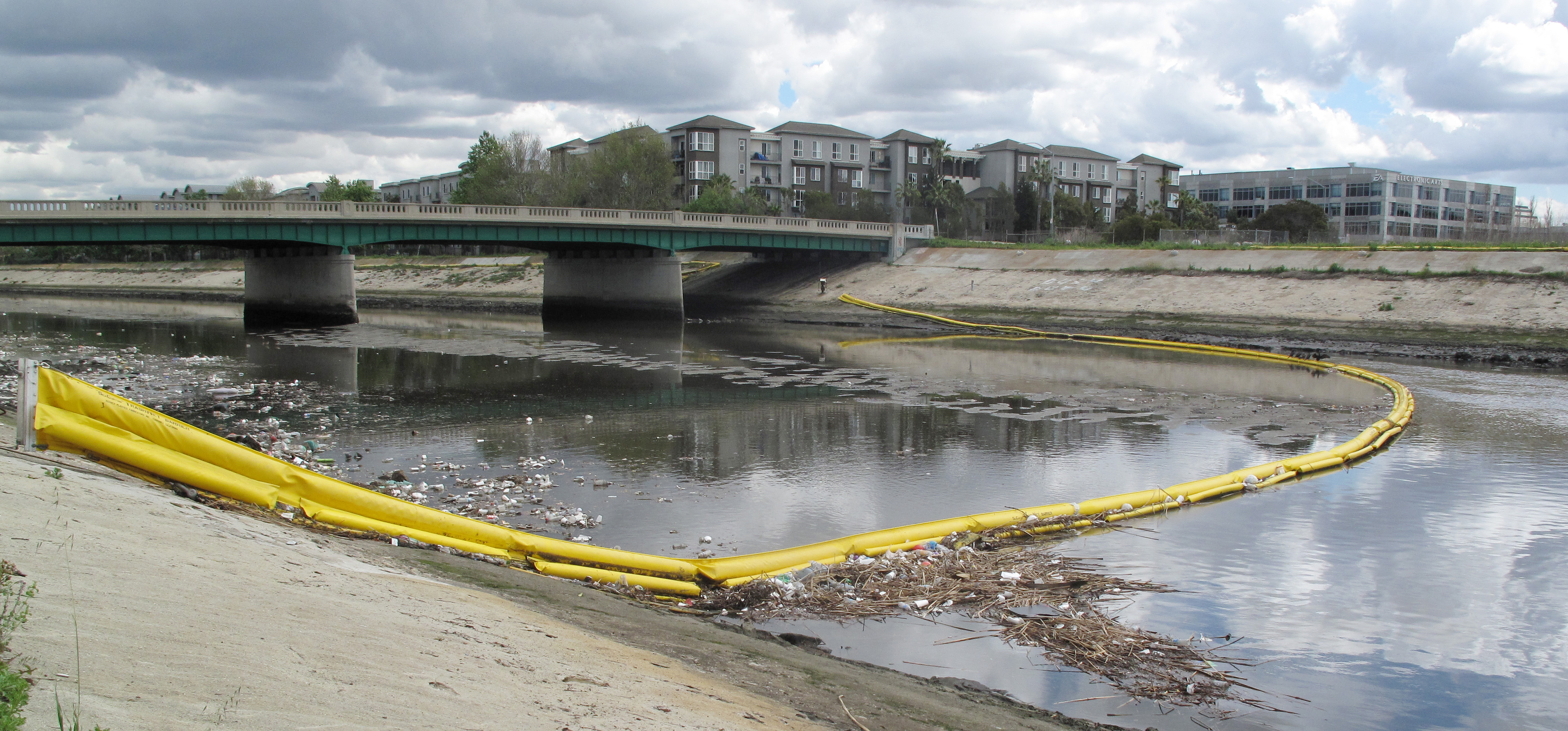
Floating barrier on Ballona Creek

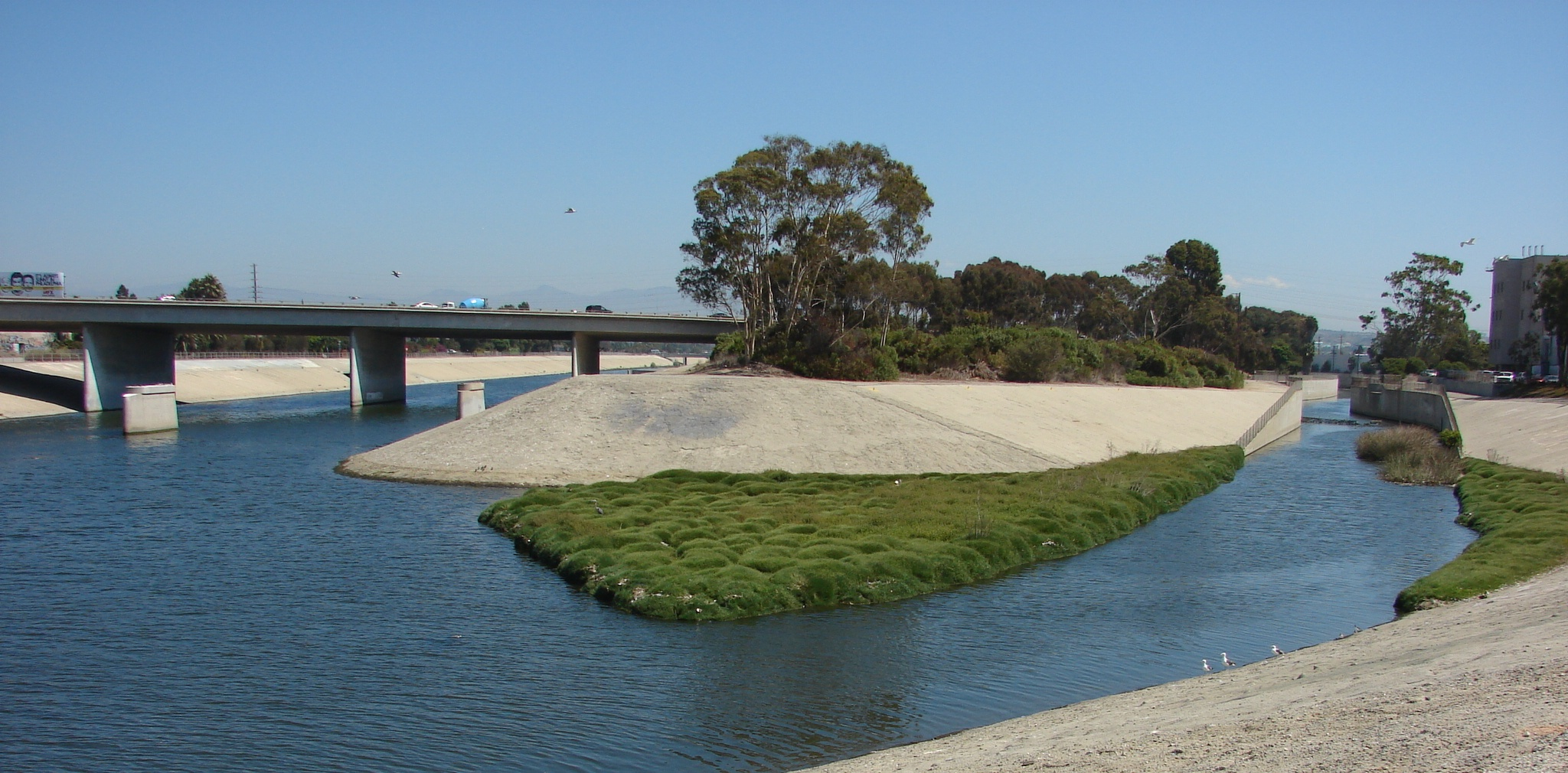
Seawater flows inland from the Pacific twice a day (at high tide) to this green salt marsh at the confluence of Ballona and Centinela Creeks

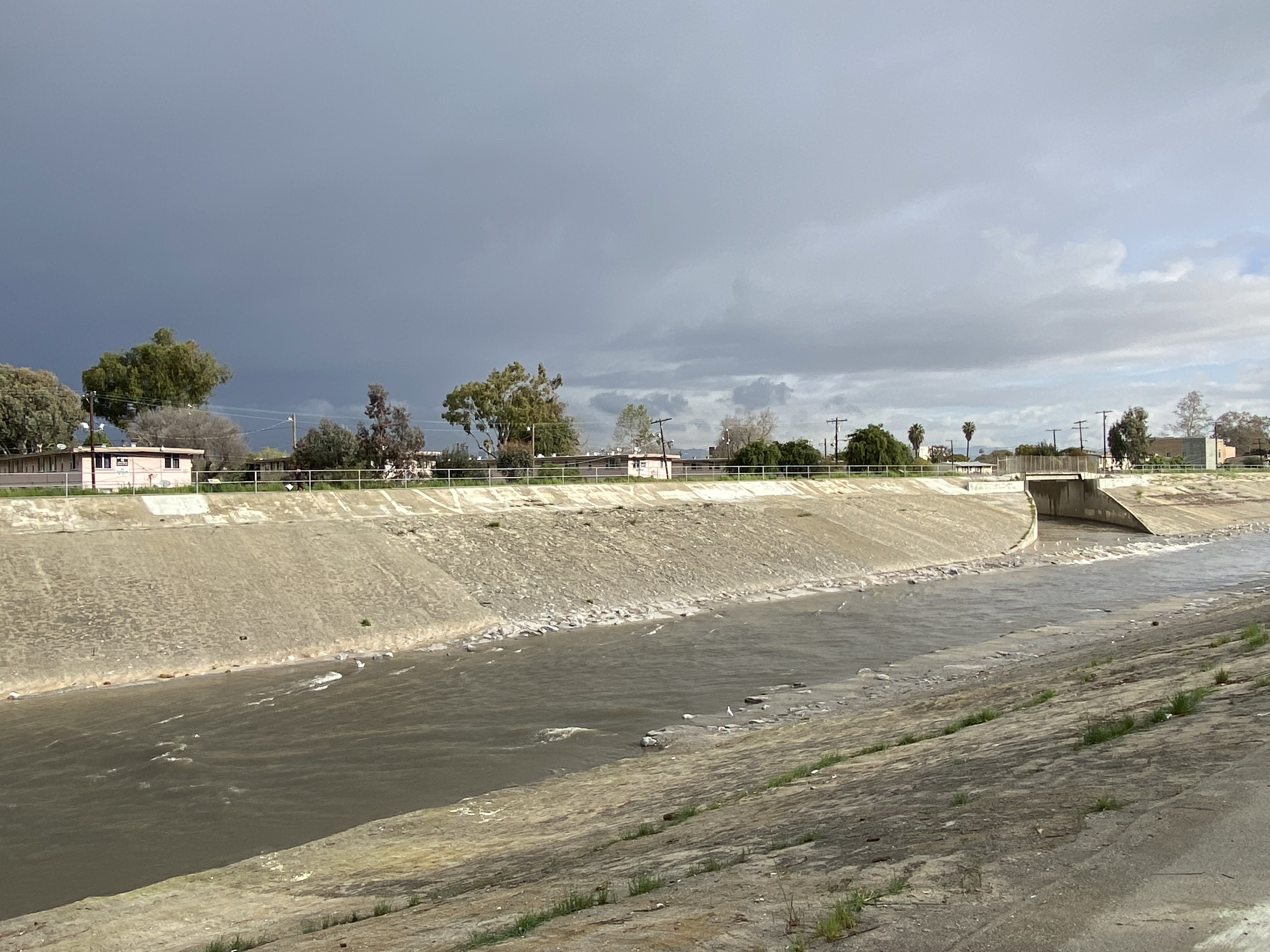
Tributary Sepulveda Creek enters Ballona; Mar Vista Gardens visible on the left

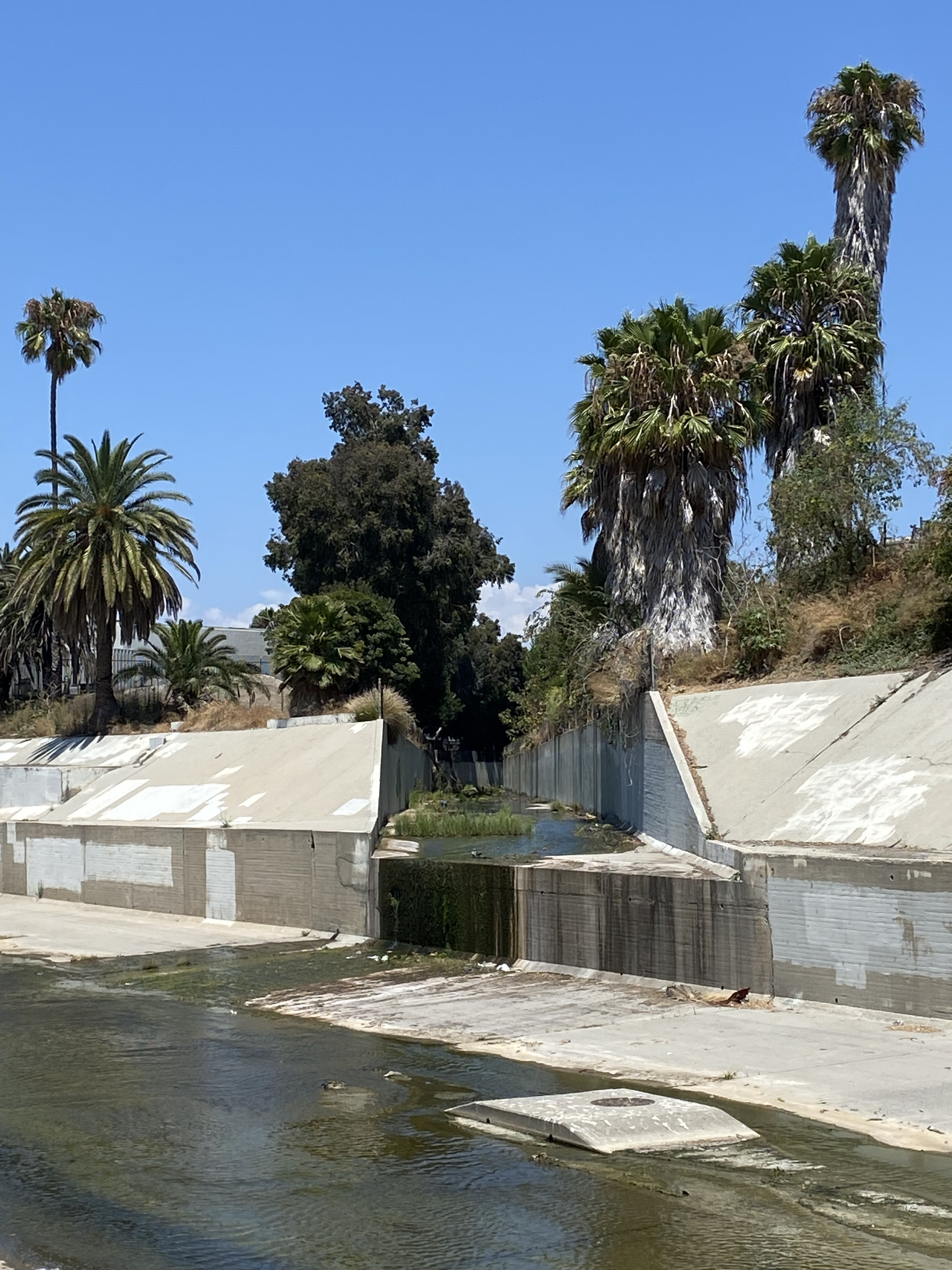
Adams Channel enters Ballona

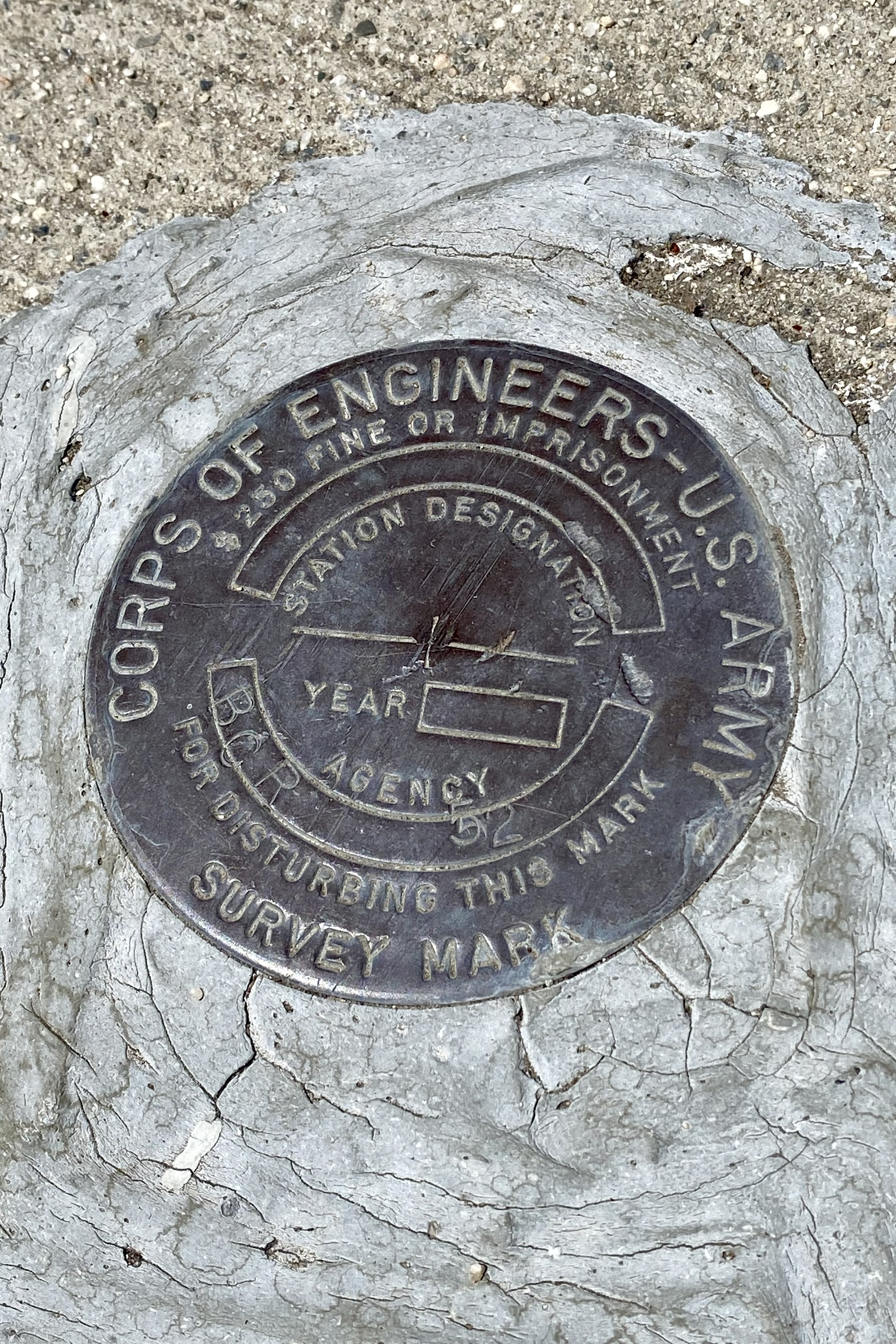
Ballona Creek BCR 52 survey marker, United States Army Corps of Engineers

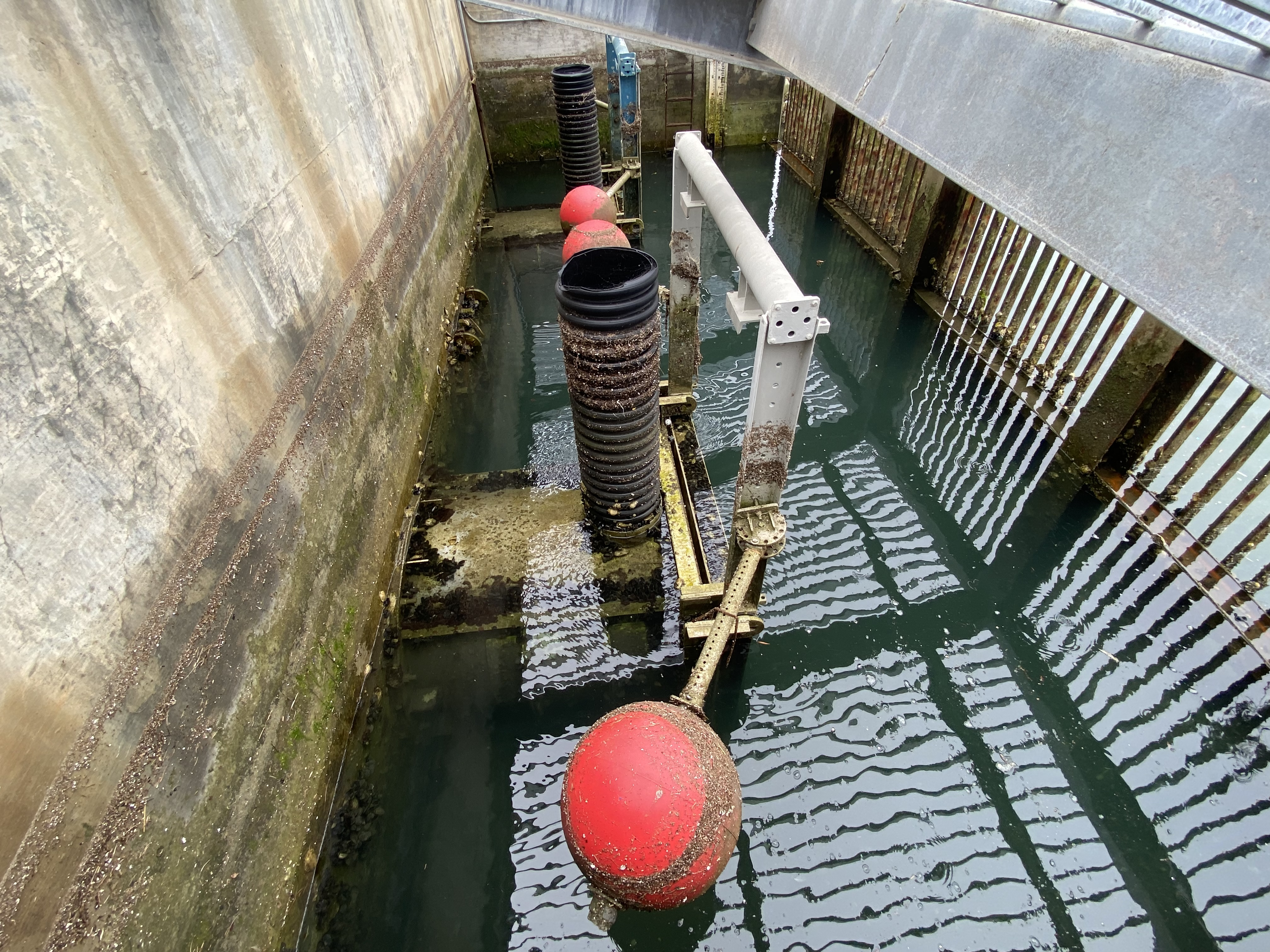
Tide gate releases water into Ballona Wetlands

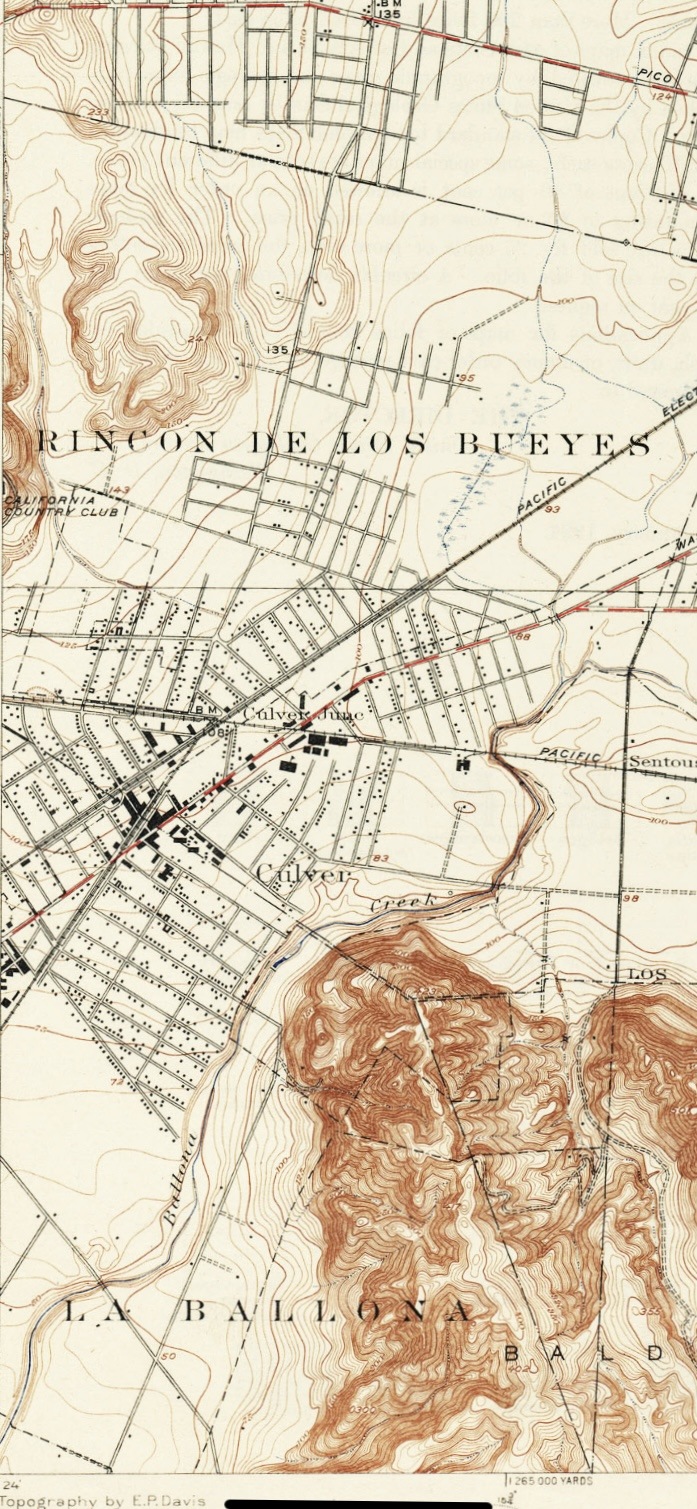
1924, still a natural stream at the base of the Baldwin Hills

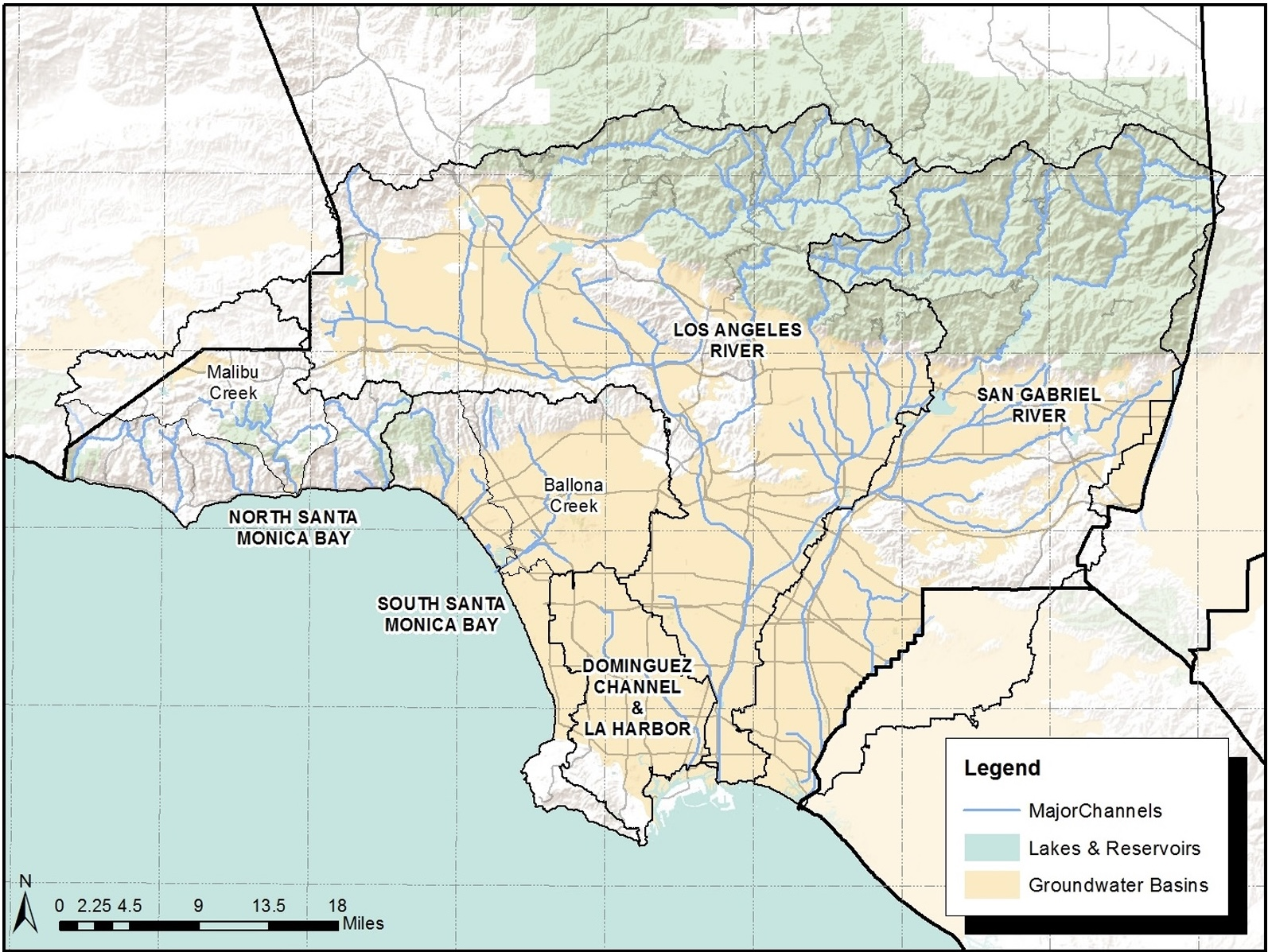
Streams and watersheds of Los Angeles County, California, including Ballona Creek

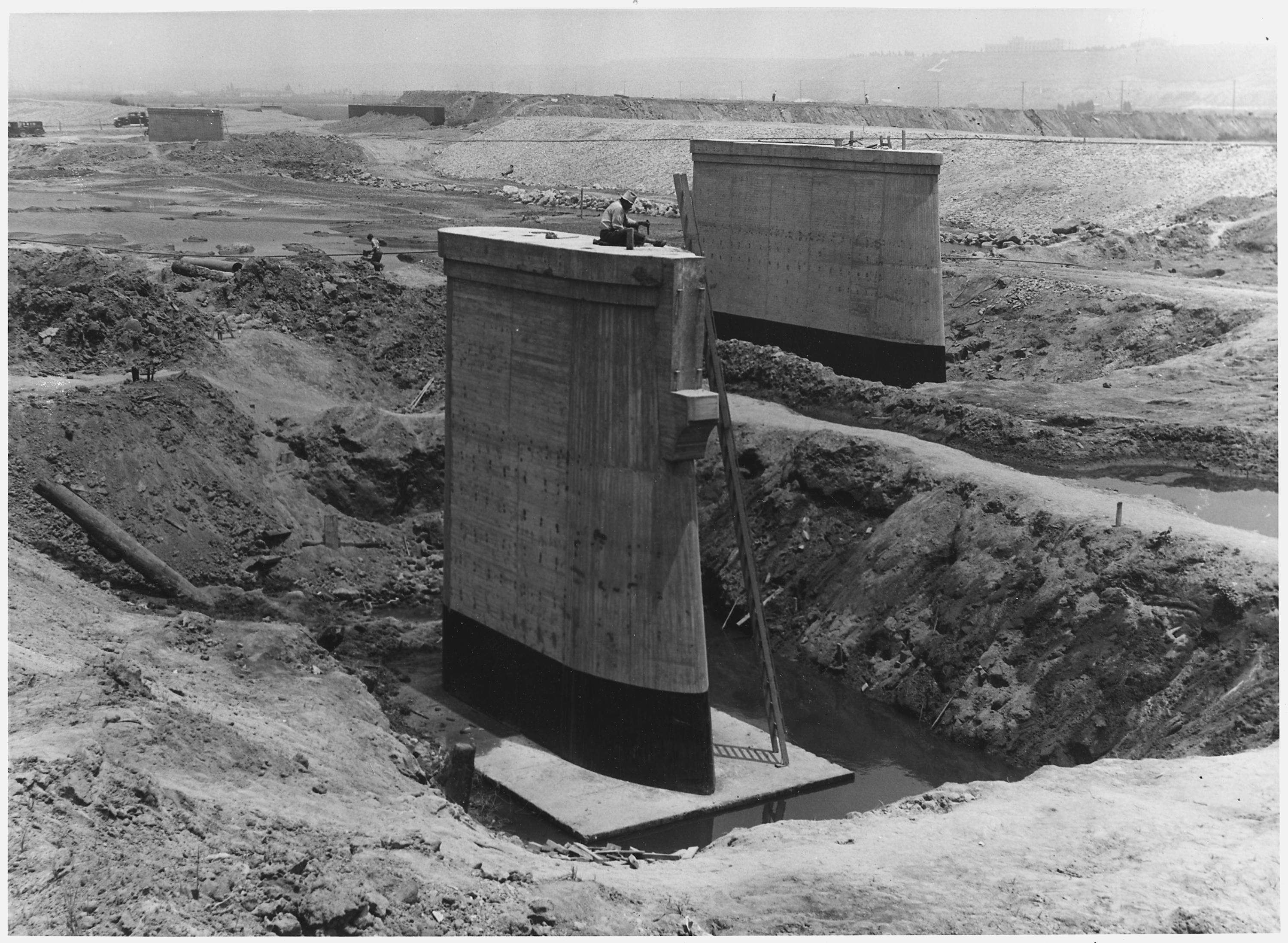
Bridge construction, 1937

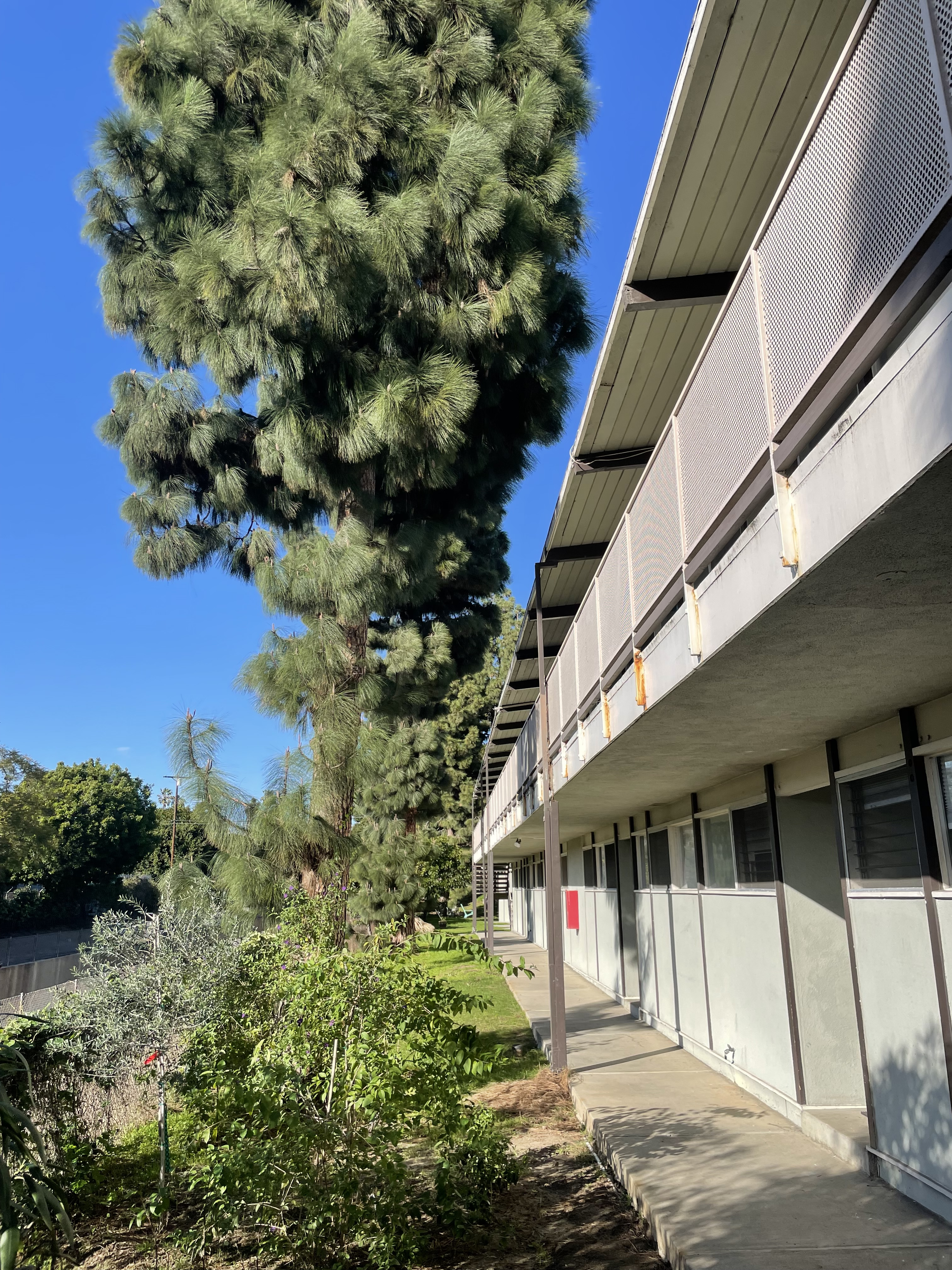
Sepulveda Rose Apartments overlooks the Sepulveda Channel

== See also ==
- Tongva Sacred Springs
- Centinela Springs
- Laurel Spring

== Sources ==
- "City of Beverly Hills General Plan Update Technical Background Report" (PDF). beverlyhills.com. 2005.
- Wood, Beatrice Dawson; Hoyt, J.C. (1913). Gazetteer of surface waters of California Part III: Pacific coast and Great basin streams (Report). Water Supply Paper 297. doi:10.3133/wsp297.
