= Weaver Creek =

Watercourse in Canada

Coordinates: 49°23′52″N 116°00′03″W

Weaver Creek is a creek located in the East Kootenay region of British Columbia. Weaver Creek is a tributary of the Moyie River. The creek has been mined for gold.
