= Culver Boulevard Median Bike Path =

Rail-trail cycle route in California, United States

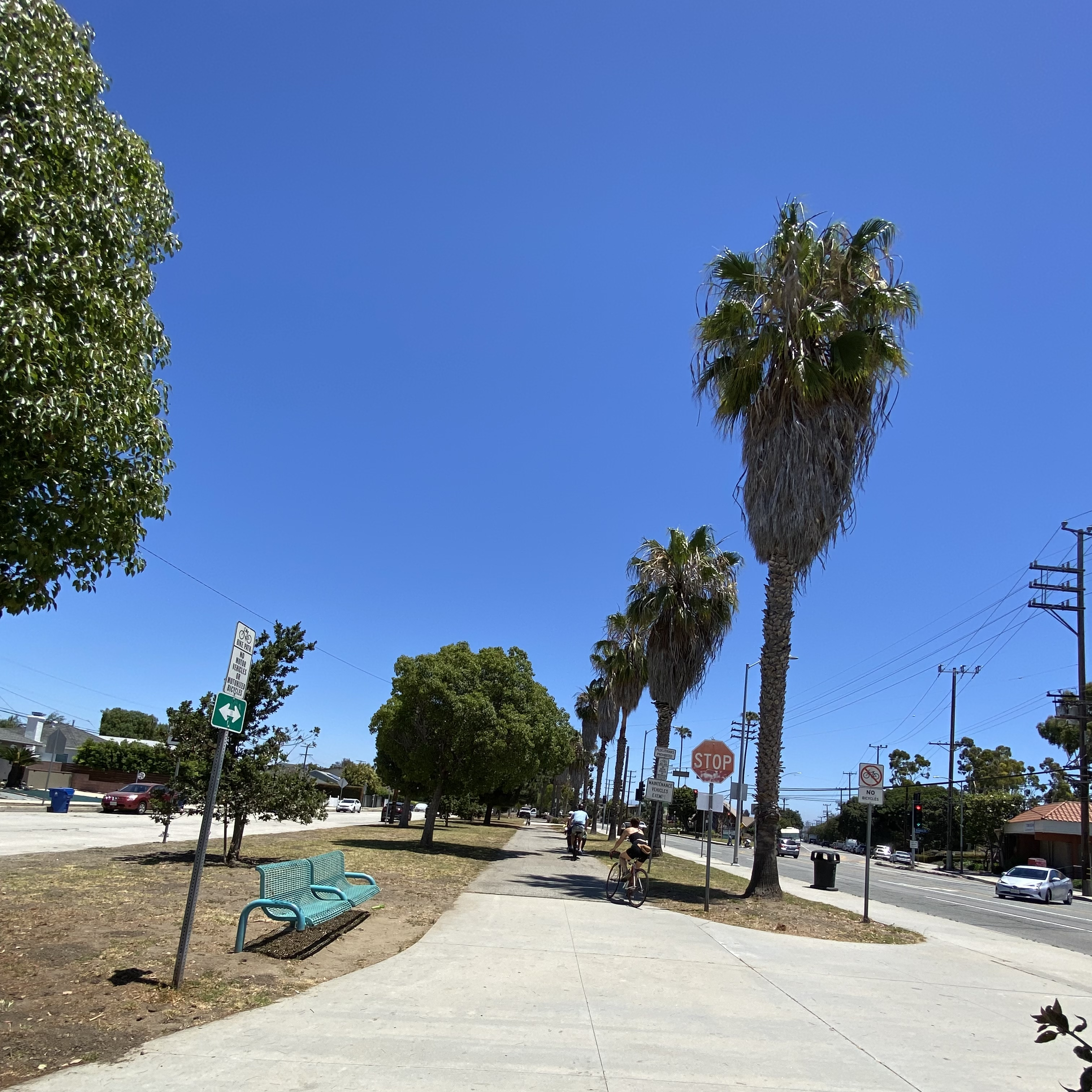
- Bike path western terminus
- Length: 2.1 mi (3.4 km)
- Location: Los Angeles County, California, United States
- Established: 1996
- Trailheads: Elenda Street; 34°00′36″N 118°24′21″W; McConnell Ave. 33°59′08″N 118°25′32″W
- Use: Active transport, road biking, walking, dogs on leash
- Difficulty: Easy
- Right of way: Redondo Beach via Playa del Rey Line
- Maintained by: Culver City, LADOT

The Culver Boulevard Median Bike Path is Class I rail trail bicycle path, walk route and linear park on Culver Boulevard in western Los Angeles County, California.

== Route ==
The path is currently 2.1 miles (3.4 km) in length. The northeastern terminus is Elenda Street in Culver City; the southwestern terminus is at McConnell Ave. in the Los Angeles neighborhood of Del Rey.

Culver is split lengthwise by the median, the streets on either side are both called Culver Boulevard on maps. The northern Culver, commonly called "Little Culver," is restricted to local traffic with dead ends blocking access from major intersections; "Big Culver" is the major automobile throughway on the south side that continues past the end of the bike route toward a wedge-shaped intersection with Jefferson Boulevard at the Ballona Wetlands.

The path passes under Interstate 405 and passes over Sepulveda Creek channel.

At the eastern terminus, cyclists can take Culver City's Elenda Bikeway (south to the Ballona Creek Pedestrian Bridge or north to Washington and then jog over to Girard Avenue to reach the Venice Boulevard bike route).

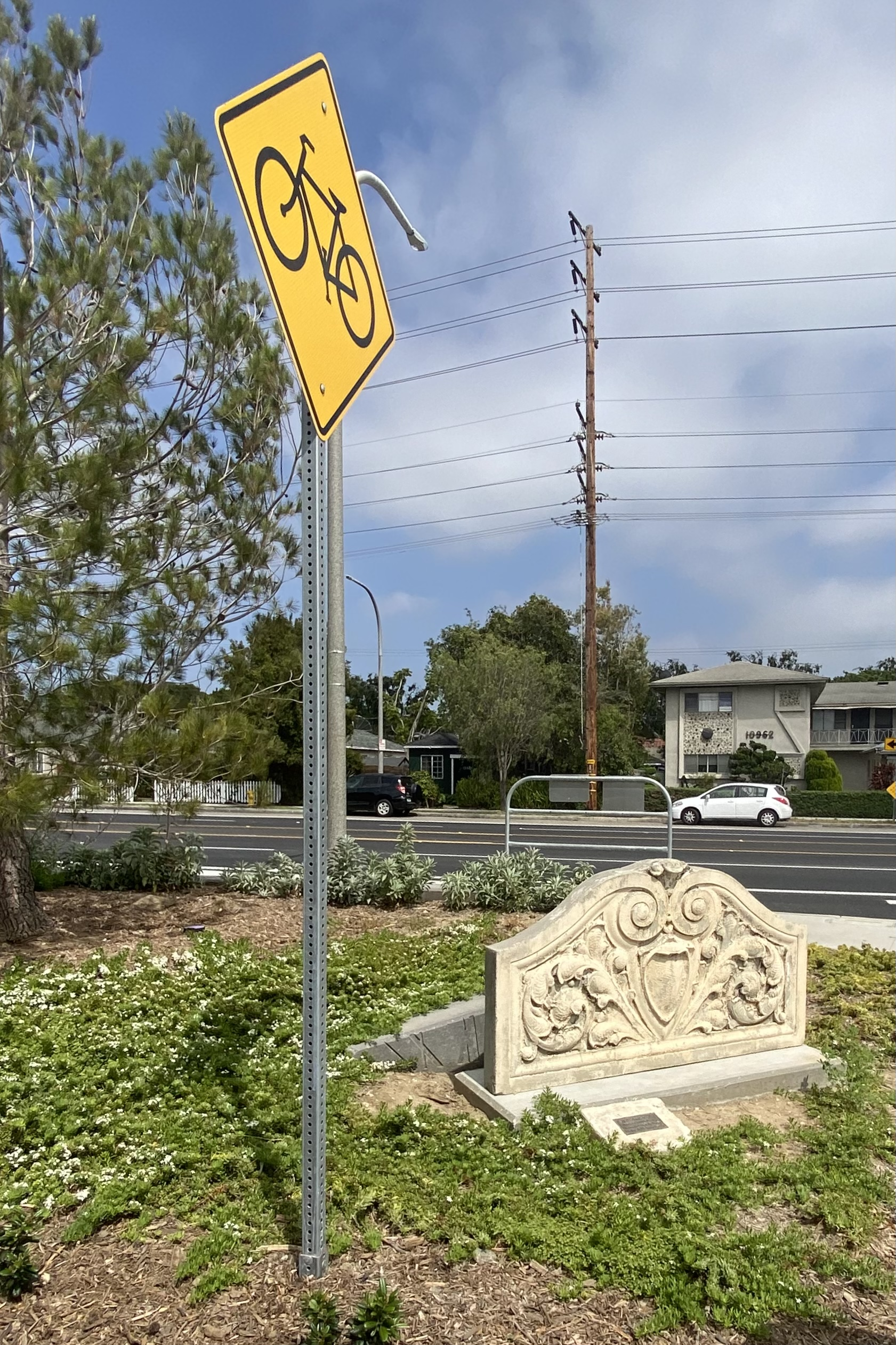
Facing "Big Culver," with salvaged architectural details from the demolished 1928 Culver City City Hall building.

At the western terminus, close to the former Alla Junction of the Pacific Electric streetcar system, cyclists can turn south to access the Ballona Creek Bike Path and the connecting Marvin Braude Bike Trail or segue past the storage facility down Panama Street toward Glen Alla Park and Marina Del Rey shopping centers.

A pedestrian path parallels the bike path for most of the median's extent; benches and open green spaces line the route. The surface of the bike path is asphalt; the surface material of pedestrian track varies between asphalt and decomposed granite.

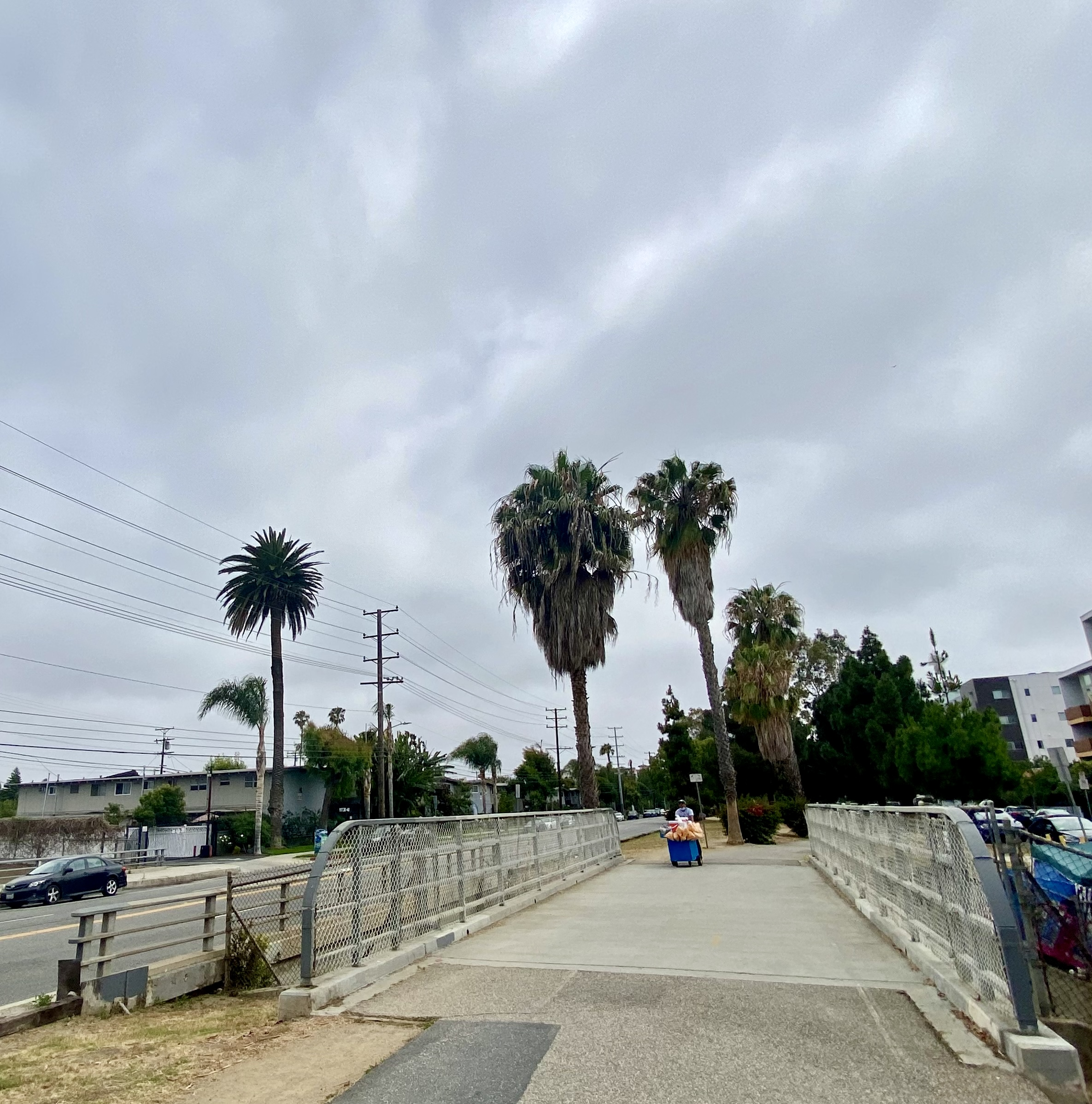
A street vendor offering chicharrónes crosses the footbridge over Sepulveda Creek channel; due to the narrow bridge the usually separate pedestrian and bike paths along the route briefly converge at this pinch point.

== Access points ==
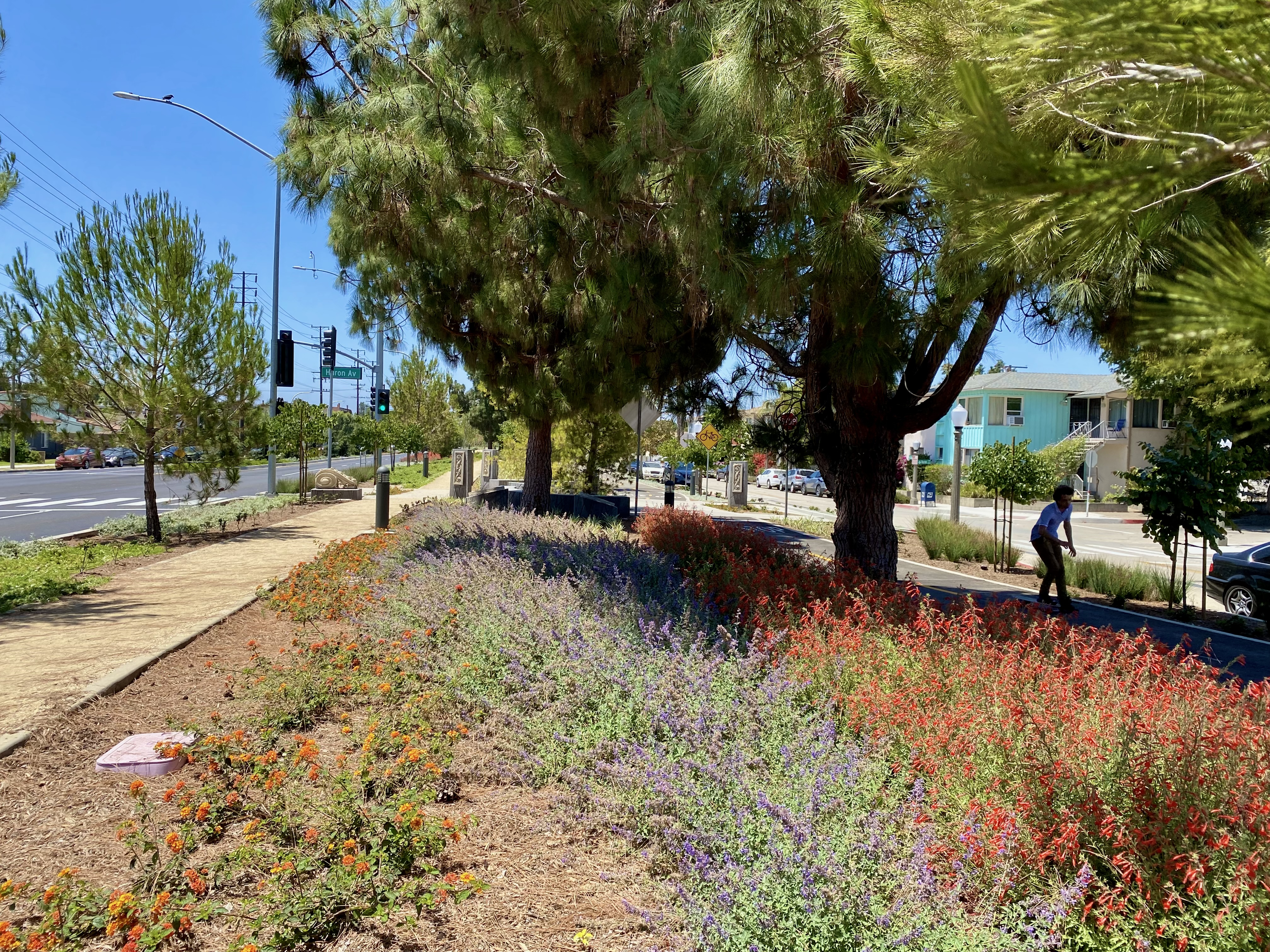
Pedestrian track, pollinator-friendly plantings, and paved cycle route

The path is flat along its entire length. Although small residential streets do not cross the median, at major streets cyclists must yield to vehicle traffic and cross when appropriate using pedestrian crosswalks.

Access ramps at major crossings, east to west:

- Elenda Street
- Sepulveda Boulevard
- Sawtelle Boulevard
- Berryman Avenue
- Inglewood Boulevard
- Centinela Avenue

Access ramps for bike and pedestrian path only, Big Culver side:

- Slauson Avenue
- McConnell Avenue

Access ramps for bike and pedestrian path only, Little Culver side:

- Lindblade Avenue & Little Culver
- Sepulveda Creek bridge (west side) & Little Culver
- McLaughlin Avenue & Little Culver
- Coolidge Avenue & Little Culver
- Kensington Avenue & Little Culver
- Centinela & Little Culver
- Panama Street & McConnell Avenue

== History ==
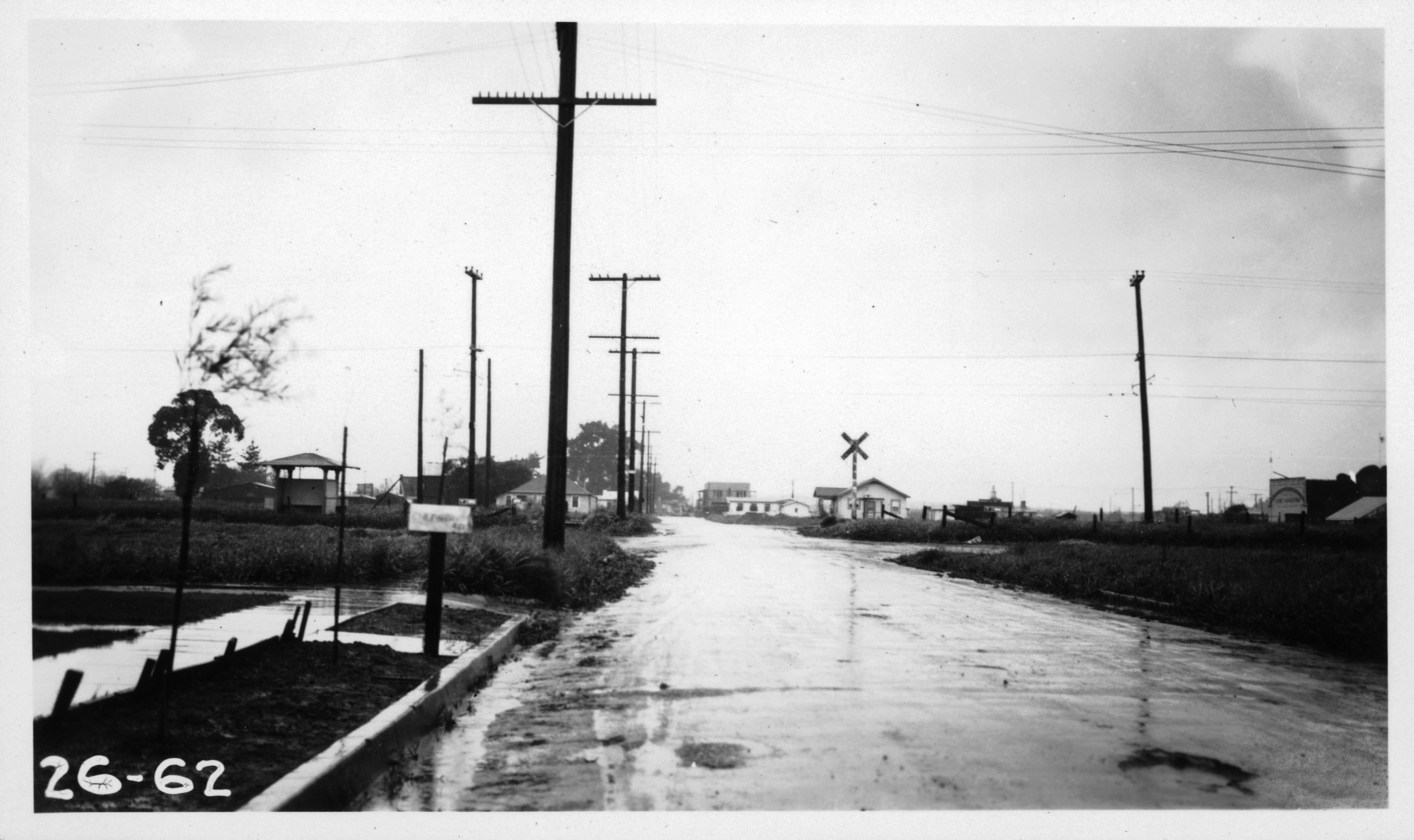
Berryman Avenue crossing Pacific Electric Del Rey Line near Culver City, looking north along Berryman Avenue, 1926; the shelter on the left may have been a transit stop

The median is a rail trail, using the right-of-way of a route that was originally the Redondo Beach via Playa del Rey Line. The tracks were used by Pacific Electric Red Cars passenger trolleys until World War II, and later used by Southern Pacific Railroad to haul freight.

"Through the co-operation of Southern Pacific" Culver City landscaped a section of the Culver Blvd. median with "trees, shrubbery and a sprinkler system" in 1966 "to obscure railroad tracks." This three-quarter mile (1.2 km) stretch of approximately between Jackson Avenue and Elenda Street is currently beyond the extent of the bike path.

Culver City purchased their remaining section of the right-of-way from Southern Pacific and landscaped it some time before 1985.

In the early 1980s, developers sought to build housing on the Los Angeles section but their plans were rejected by the city council.

In 1996, the median officially became a class I bike route when Culver City redesigned the .75 miles (1.21 km) section located in Culver City between Elenda and Sawtelle, and established separate walking and biking paths protected from adjacent car traffic.

Los Angeles initiated an improvement project for the stretch between Sawtelle and McConnell in 1997, prior to which "On the Los Angeles section, a 60 feet (18 m)-wide swath of dirt and weeds cuts through residential neighborhoods. Discarded furniture, including mattresses and sofas, and broken-down appliances often are dumped along the median. Cars and trucks, even 18-wheel big rigs, park there."

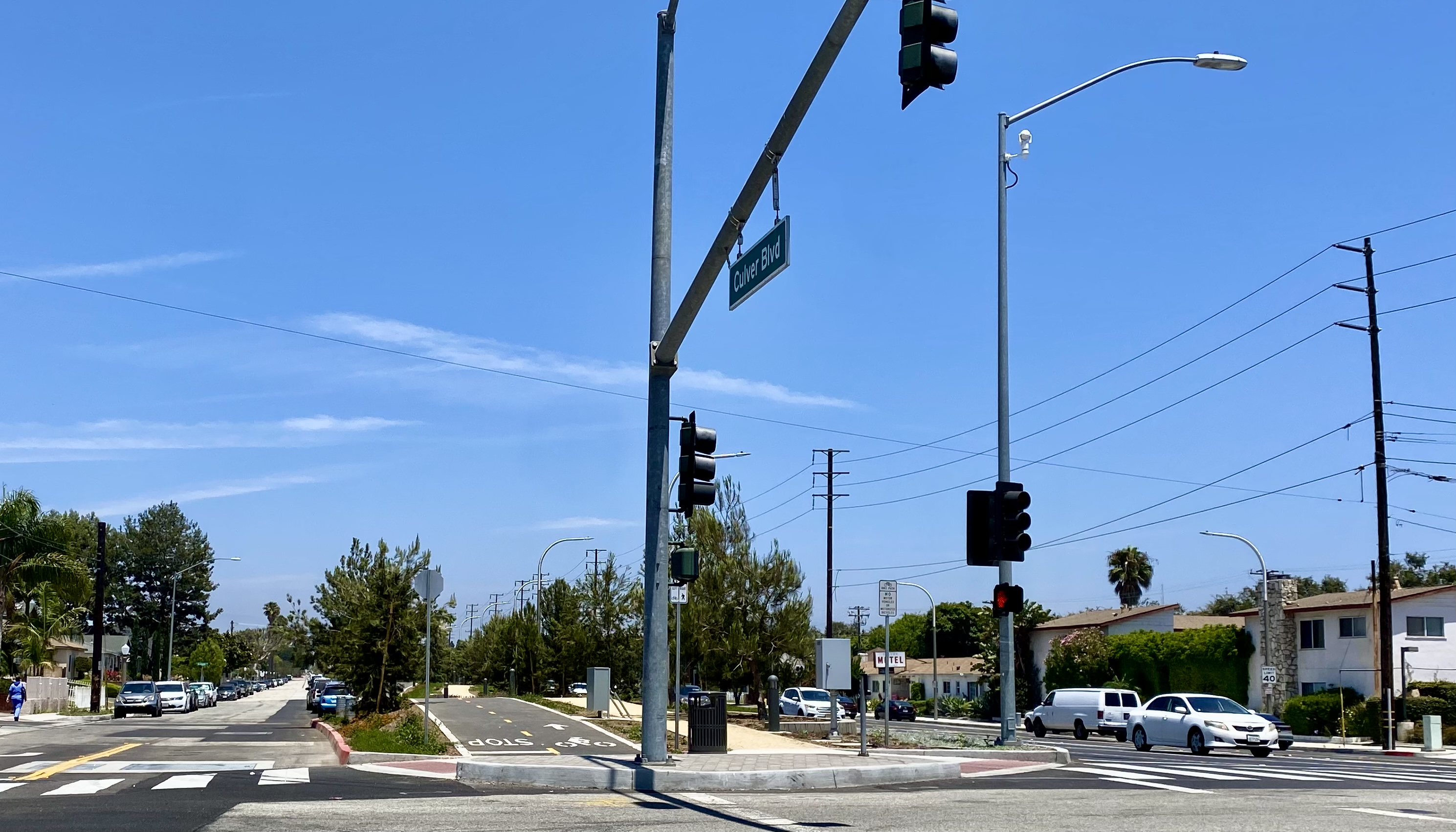
Culver Blvd. Median Bike Path, at Sepulveda Blvd. (L to R: "Little Culver," paved bike path, pedestrian footpath, "Big Culver"

The section from Sepulveda Boulevard west to Berryman was repaved and re-striped. In 2022, the Culver City section between Elenda and Sepulveda was reconstructed and replanted as part of a larger project that "installed underground water features to detain rainwater and other urban run-off, for both infiltration and for use for irrigation."

The cities of Los Angeles and Culver City are each responsible for the maintenance of the portions of the path that fall within their respective city limits.

== See also ==
- List of Los Angeles bike paths
  - Ballona Creek Bike Path
  - Park to Playa Trail
  - Beach Bike Path
  - Expo Bike Path (rail-trail using Santa Monica Air Line right-of-way)
- Redondo Beach via Playa del Rey Line
- Beach Cities Greenway
