= List of parks in Lancaster, California =

There are numerous parks in the city of Lancaster, California.

== County parks ==
The city of Lancaster's residents have immediate access to two Los Angeles County Parks:

Park	Address	Notes
Apollo Community Regional Park	4555 West Avenue G	
George Lane Park	5520 West Avenue L-8	Located just outside city limits in the bordering unincorporated area of Quartz Hill.

== Municipal parks ==
Municipal parks are under the administration of the City of Lancaster Department of Parks, Arts, Recreation and Community Services. There are over 450 acres of city parks.

Park	Address	Notes
American Heroes Park	701 West Kettering Avenue	Community park.
Deputy Pierre W. Bain Park	45045 North 5th Street East	Community park. Includes Eastside Pool
El Dorado Park	44501 North 5th Street East	Neighborhood park.
Forrest E. Hull Park	2850 West Avenue L-12	Neighborhood park. Also known as Hull Park.
James C. Gilley Lancaster National Soccer Center	43000 30th Street East	Community park.
Jane Reynolds Park	716 Oldfield Street	Neighborhood park. Includes Webber Pool
Sargeant Steve Owen Memorial Park	43063 10th Street West	Community Park. Includes Big 8 Softball Complex. Previously Lancaster City Park.
Mariposa Park	45755 North Fig Avenue	Neighborhood park.
Rawley Duntley Park	3334 West Avenue K	Community park.
Skytower Park	43434 North Vineyard	Neighborhood park.
Tierra Bonita Park	44910 27th Street East	Community park.
Whit Carter Park	45635 Sierra Highway	Community park.
Prime Desert Woodland Preserve	43201 35th Street West	Open space

== See also ==
- List of parks in Los Angeles County, California
