= 17th Street/SMC station =

Light rail station

17th St/SMC
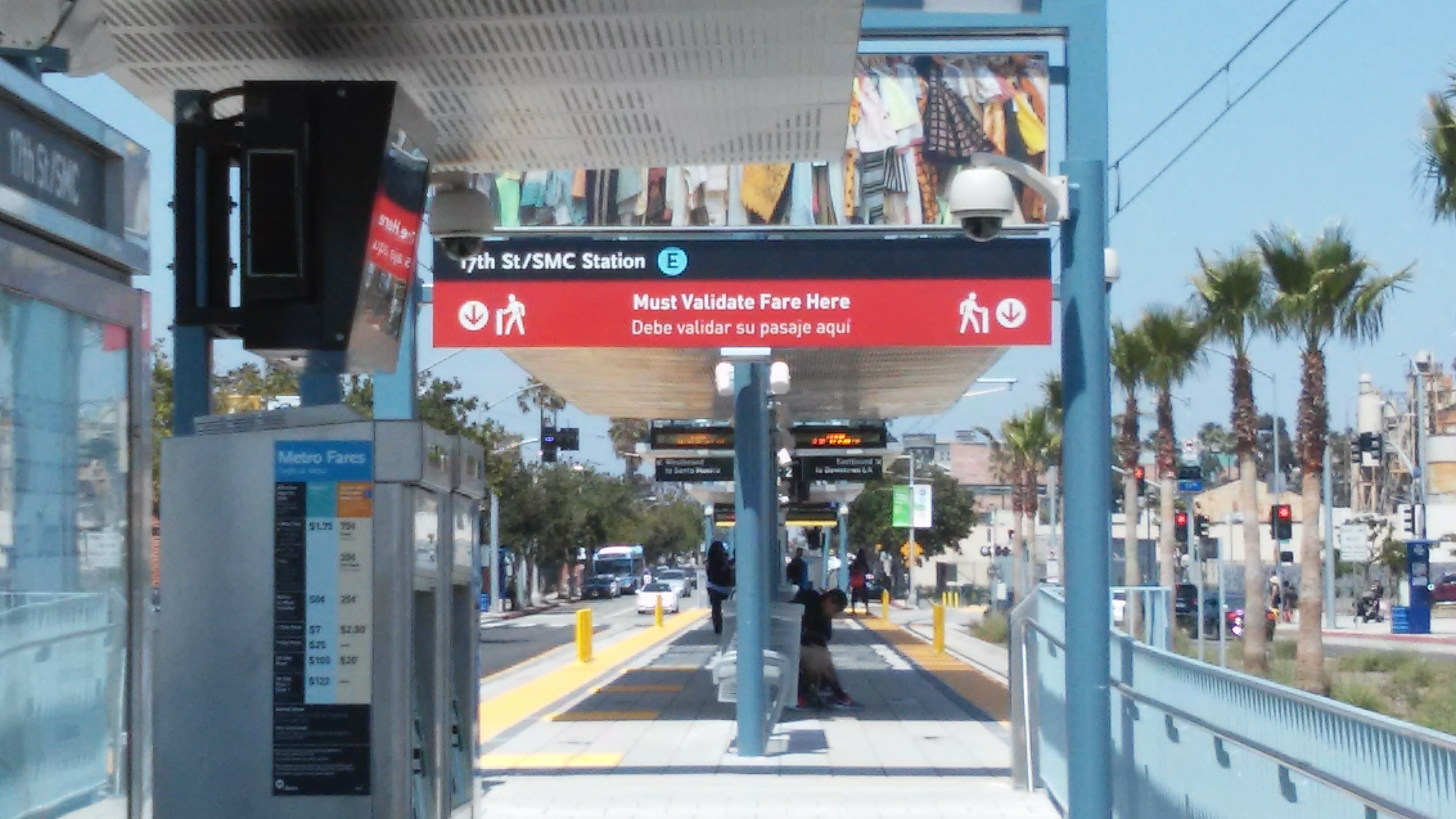
- 17th Street/SMC station platform in 2016

General information
- Location: 1701 Colorado Avenue; Santa Monica, California, U.S.
- Coordinates: 34.0237°N 118.4797°W
- Owner: Los Angeles County Metropolitan Transportation Authority
- Platforms: 1 island platform
- Tracks: 2
- Connections: Big Blue Bus

Construction
- Parking: 70 spaces
- Cycle facilities: Metro Bike Share station, racks and lockers
- Accessible: Yes

History
- Opened: October 17, 1875
- Rebuilt: May 20, 2016
- Former names: Sunset

Passengers
- FY 2025: 1,606 (avg. wkdy boardings)

Services
Preceding station	Metro Rail	Following station
Downtown Santa Monica Terminus	E Line	26th Street/Bergamot toward East LA
Location

17th Street/SMC station is an at-grade light rail station in the Los Angeles Metro Rail system located near the intersection of 17th Street and Colorado Avenue in Santa Monica, California. It is located 0.6 miles northwest from Santa Monica College (SMC), for which the station is named. It is served by the E Line.

== History ==
The interurban Santa Monica Air Line ran south of Colorado on a private right-of-way in this area. While the E Line follows the Air Line's right-of-way for much of its route, the line and its stations in this area were moved to the median of Colorado Boulevard per a request from the City of Santa Monica during its design phase.

== Notable places nearby ==
The station is within walking distance of the following notable places:

- Santa Monica College
- 18th Street Arts Center
- Woodlawn Memorial Cemetery
- Expo Bike Path

== Service ==
=== Station layout ===
The station is located in the Midtown District of Santa Monica, in the center of Colorado Avenue west of 17th Street, adjacent to Memorial Park: the City of Santa Monica refers to this station area as the "Memorial Park Neighborhood Transit Village". It is three blocks from Santa Monica College.

The east end of the station is at 17th Street and the west end of the station is mid-block between 15th and 16th Streets with entrances at either end. Parking and an off-street bus stop is located just south of Colorado between 16th and 17th Streets.

=== Hours and frequency ===
E Line service hours are from approximately 4:30 a.m. and 11:45 p.m daily. Trains operate every 8 minutes during peak hours, Monday to Friday. Trains run every 10 minutes, during midday on weekdays and weekends, from 9:00 a.m. to 7:00 p.m. Night and early morning service is approximately every 20 minutes every day.

=== Connections ===
As of July 30, 2026, the following connections are available:

- Big Blue Bus (Santa Monica): 5, 41, 43 and 44
