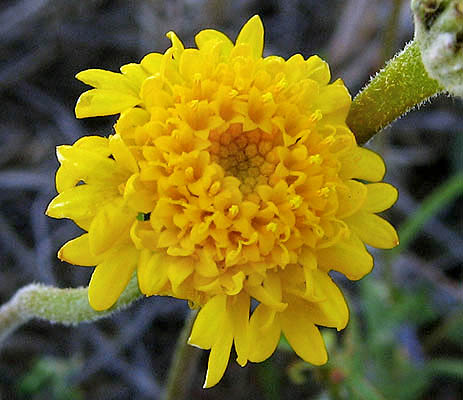

Scientific classification
- Kingdom: Plantae
- Clade: Tracheophytes
- Clade: Angiosperms
- Clade: Eudicots
- Clade: Asterids
- Order: Asterales
- Family: Asteraceae
- Genus: Chaenactis
- Species: C. glabriuscula

Binomial name
- Chaenactis glabriuscula DC.

Synonyms
- Synonymy: Chaenactis filifolia Harv.; Chaenactis tenuifolia Nutt.; Chaenactis gracilenta Greene, syn of var. heterocarpha; Chaenactis heterocarpha Torr. & A.Gray ex A.Gray, syn of var. heterocarpha; Chaenactis tanacetifolia A.Gray, syn of var. heterocarpha; Chaenactis tanacetaefolia A.Gray, syn of var. heterocarpha; Chaenactis lanosa DC., syn of var. lanosa; Chaenactis orcuttiana (Greene) Parish, syn of var. orcuttiana

= Chaenactis glabriuscula =

Species of flowering plant

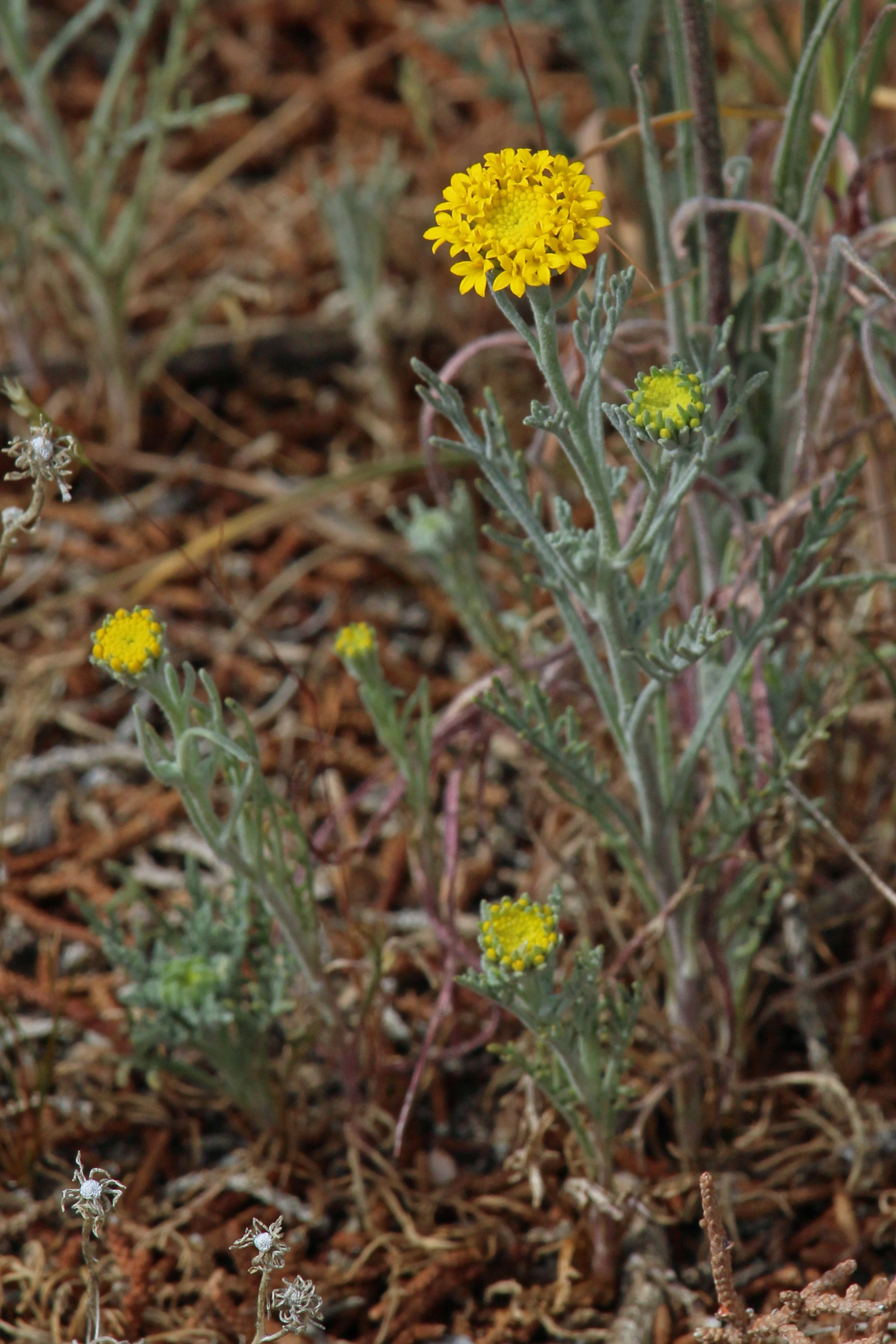
Chaenactis glabriuscula var. glabriuscula, western Antelope Valley, California

Chaenactis glabriuscula, with the common name yellow pincushion, is a species of flowering plant in the daisy family. It is native to California and Baja California.

== Distribution and habitat ==
Chaenactis glabriuscula grows in a wide variety of habitats, such as the Sierra Nevada, the Mojave and Colorado Deserts, and the interior chaparral and woodlands, coastal sage and chaparral, and the montane chaparral and woodlands ecoregions. It is a variable plant, especially across varieties, of which there are many. It is generally found below 7,000 feet (2,100 m) elevation.

== Description ==
In general, Chaenactis glabriuscula is an annual herb producing one or more mainly erect stems approaching 50 cm (20 inches) in maximum height. The branching stems are hairy and often cobwebby with fibers. The leaves are up to about 10 centimeters (4 inches) long, sometimes fleshy, and usually divided into many very small, curling lobes.

The inflorescence produces one to twenty or more flower heads on a very long, erect peduncle. The flower head is lined with flat, hairy or woolly glandular phyllaries 4.5–10 mm (0.18–0.39 in). It contains many tubular flowers in shades of gold to bright yellow, the outermost flowers large and flat-faced, most with protruding anthers. The fruit is an achene which may be over a centimeter long including its layered pappus of scales.

Varieties

- Chaenactis glabriuscula var. glabriuscula - from Tehama Co to Baja California
- Chaenactis glabriuscula var. heterocarpha (Torr. & A.Gray ex A.Gray) H.M.Hall - from Shasta Co to Ventura Co plus a few in Modoc Co + San Bernardino Co
- Chaenactis glabriuscula var. lanosa (DC.) H.M.Hall - from Fresno Co to San Diego Co
- Chaenactis glabriuscula var. megacephala A.Gray - from Shasta Co to Orange Co
- Chaenactis glabriuscula var. orcuttiana (Greene) H.M.Hall - coast from Ventura Co to Baja California

One variety, Chaenactis glabriuscula var. orcuttiana — Orcutt's yellow pincushion, is a rare variety limited to the beaches and coastal dunes of Southern California and Baja, where it is threatened by development of its coastal habitat. Urban locations on the Santa Monica Bay, in the northern Ballona Wetlands near Venice and on the Bell Avenue Sand Dune Park recreation area's dune (~185 plants) in Manhattan Beach, each had var. orcuttiana populations newly discovered in Spring 2010. The variety is listed by the California Native Plant Society as endemic to California dune ecosystems and significantly declining, with confirmed populations in parts of Ventura, Los Angeles and San Diego counties.
