= Sand Dune Park =

Recreation area in Manhattan Beach, California

Coordinates: 33.89886°N 118.41293°W

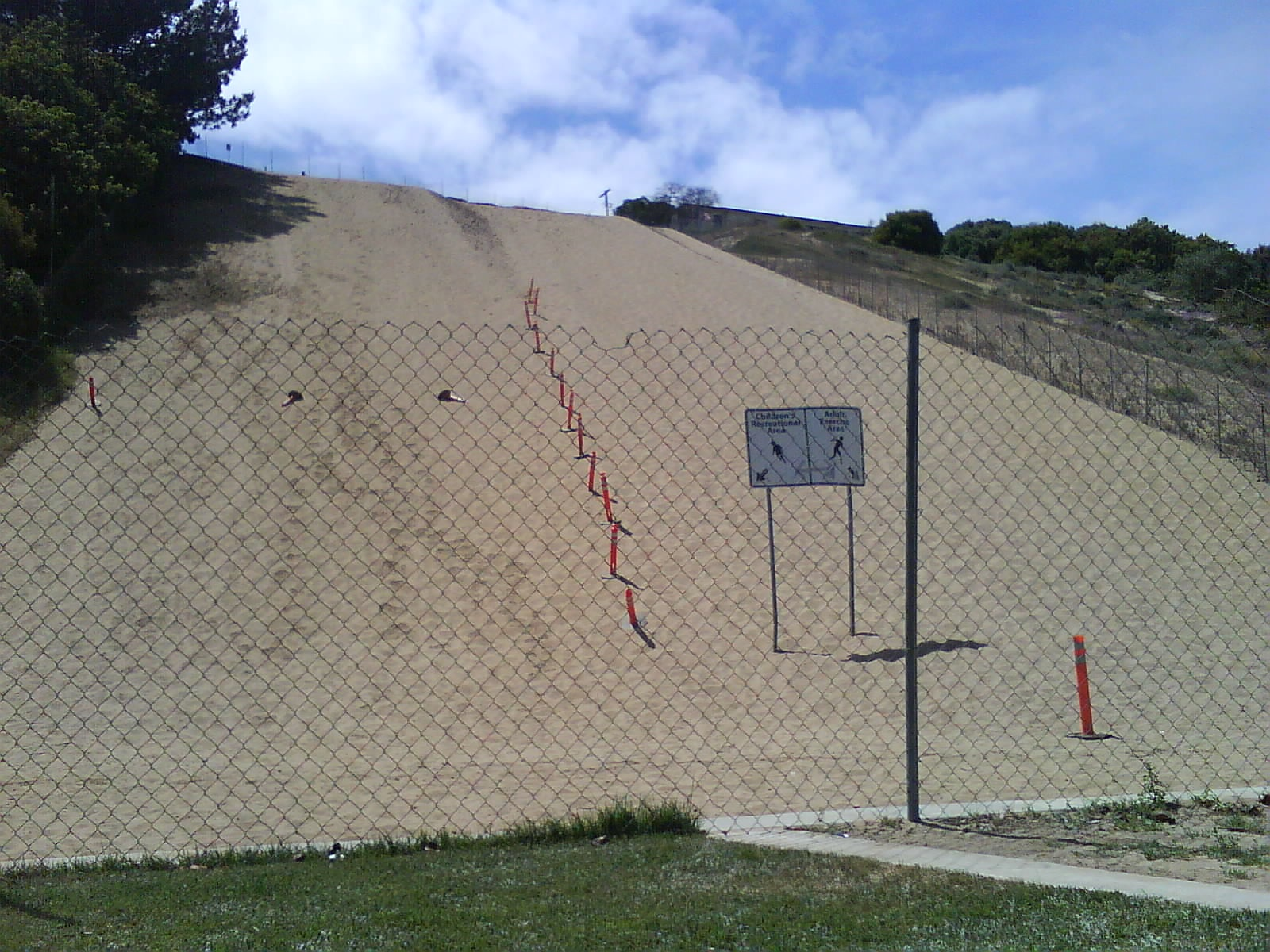
The sand dunes at Sand Dune Park, Manhattan Beach, California

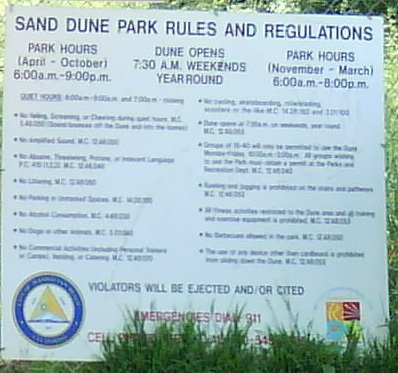
The warning sign at Sand Dune Park, Manhattan Beach, California

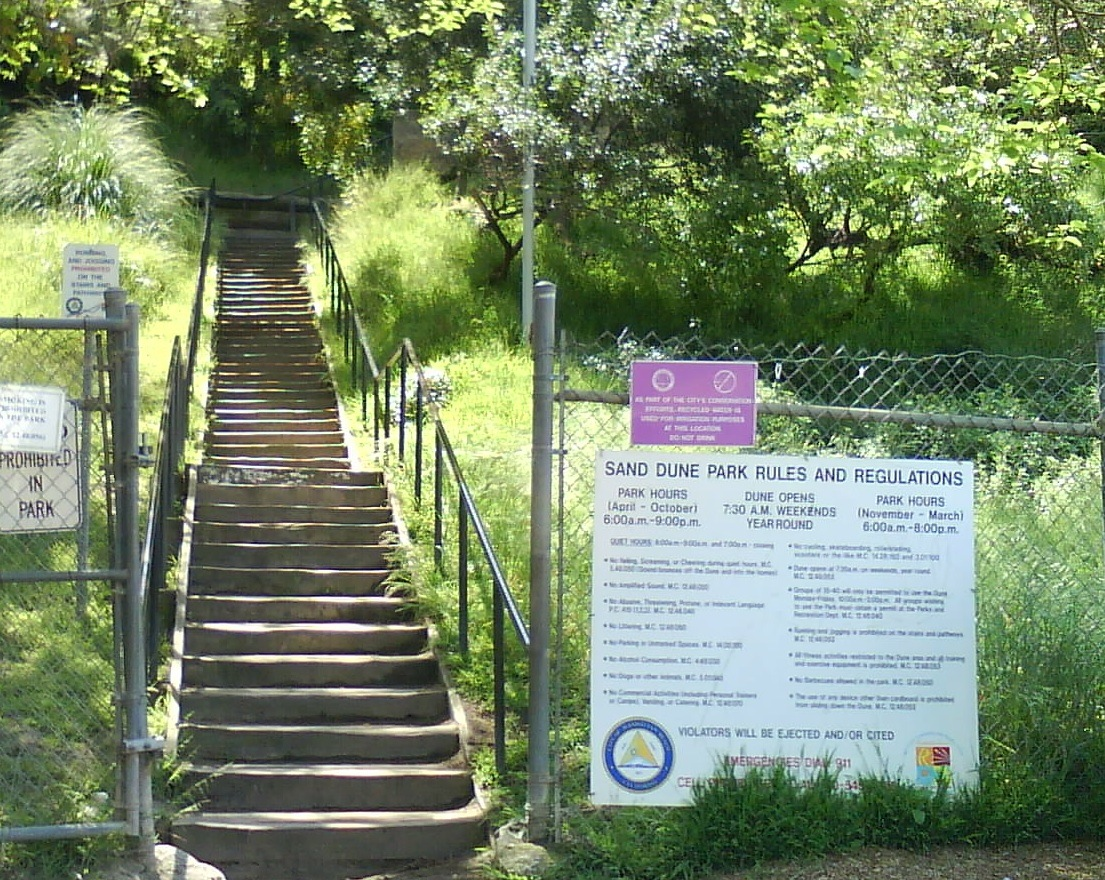
The stairs and warning sign at Sand Dune Park, Manhattan Beach, California

Sand Dune Park is an area of public sand dunes partly on a steep slope that is used for exercise in Manhattan Beach, California. The area has been used by amateur and professional athletes and has been featured in fitness magazines and newspaper accounts as a great workout spot.

The park around the dune was built on a converted dump site by local residents in 1964. It was "just a little patch of grass and sand to enjoy when the area was still mostly small beach cottages" and remains one of the last "remnants of a time when much of the South Bay landscape was sand dunes", according to local historian Jan Dennis. Its popularity has grown and fencing, parking restrictions, and closure was considered.

== Restrictions ==
A fight to close down the sand dune portion of the park or restrict its access came to a head in 2009 when neighbors came out in opposition to the sand dune over noise, traffic and overcrowding concerns. Several City Council meetings addressed the issues involved, and the sand dune was closed and fenced. The restrictions were controversial in 2009 and some claimed the residents were acting out of racism, which city officials denied. Many of the park visitors came from other cities in Los Angeles County. After negotiation, the dune was reopened in August 2010 after the implementation of substantial use mitigation measures.

Currently, use of the sand dune portion of the park is by reservation only, which must be made in advance at City Hall, a little over a mile away during business hours. The entrance to the fenced area is supervised during scheduled hours. The city has heavily fining violators of the restrictions (including non-residents who are unaware of the rigidity of the restrictions) hundreds of dollars for a single violation.

Next to the dune is an un-restricted set of 208 steps that look like an attractive alternative, though there are signs that read "No Jogging." Fines are higher for jogging on the steps. The city regularly sends police to watch for violators. When questioned, enforcement officials seem to distinguish between jogging and walking, the rules sound very close to those of International Racewalking, requiring one foot to be on the ground at all times.

“I live nine houses away from the park and I had no idea a ticket for this is actually $600 . . . This amount of money is ridiculous and excessive.”

A group of residents was formed to advocate for more recreational usage. A study showed the fencing and restrictions were keeping people away, usage down 45%. As a response, the city kept the restrictions, but opened up a few additional usage slots in late 2011.

== Notable users ==
The park has been used by Troy Polamalu of the Pittsburgh Steelers, Thomas Mayo of the NY Jets, former UCLA defensive back Kirk Alexander, Kobe Bryant, Andrew Bynum and several of their Los Angeles Lakers teammates "past and present". Paul Pierce of the Los Angeles Clippers, Tony Gonzalez of the Atlanta Falcons and "any number of NHL players, USC and UCLA football players, volleyball players, boxers, fighters, sprinters and WNBA players" have also "taken on the dune, sharing the sand with a steady stream of weekend warriors."

== Flora ==
Chaenactis glabriuscula var. orcuttiana — Orcutt's yellow pincushion, is a rare native plant limited to the coastal dunes of southern California. The Bell Avenue Sand Dune Park in Manhattan Beach and the Ballona Wetlands each had var. orcuttiana populations newly discovered in Spring 2010. The variety is listed by the California Native Plant Society as endemic to California coastal dunes ecosystems and significantly declining.

== See also ==
- List of parks in Los Angeles County, California
