= Expo Bike Path =

Rail with trail bicycle path in Los Angeles County, California

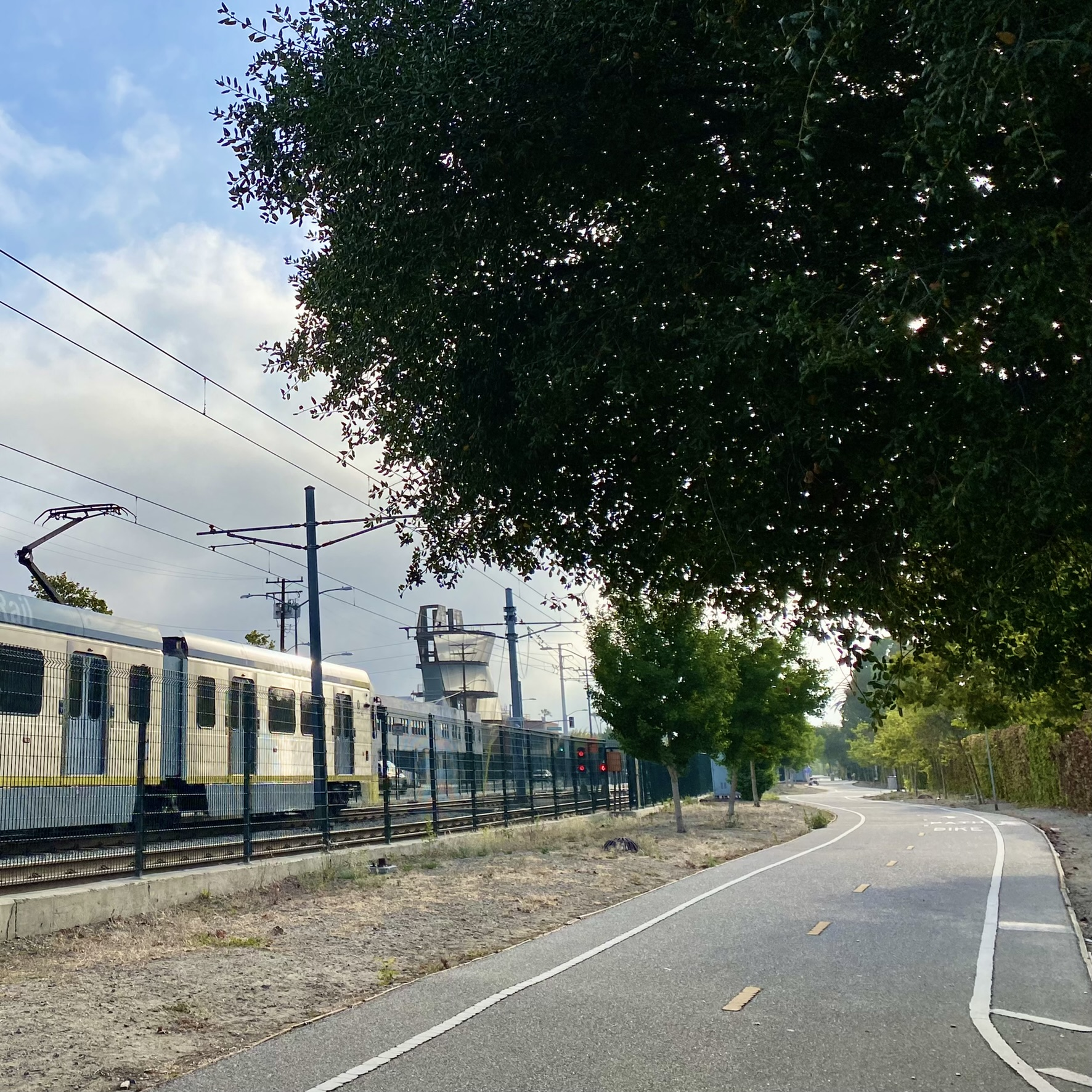
- Path between La Cienega/Jefferson and Culver City stations
- Length: 12 (Note: There is a distance of 2.1 miles (3.4 km) worth of gaps. Without gaps, the mileage would be 9.9 miles (15.9 km).) mi (19 km)
- Location: Los Angeles County, California, United States
- Established: 2012
- Completed: 2016
- Trailheads: La Cienega/Jefferson; 17th Street/SMC
- Use: Active transportation, road biking, walking, dogs on leash
- Difficulty: Easy
- Right of way: E Line
- Maintained by: Los Angeles Metro

The Expo Bike Path is a 12-mile-long (19 km) rail with trail bicycle path and pedestrian route in Los Angeles County, California that travels roughly parallel to the Los Angeles Metro Rail's E Line between La Cienega/Jefferson and 17th Street/SMC stations. The Expo Bike Path is one of two major bicycle routes in Los Angeles that share dedicated rights of way with public transport, the other being the G Line Bikeway in the San Fernando Valley.

The Santa Monica Air Line used the right of way from 1909 to 1953. The track was last used for freight in 1988; the county transportation agency bought the route from the Southern Pacific Transportation Company in 1991.

Rails-to-trails advocacy groups quickly began agitating for a bike route along the Exposition corridor, with one 1992 Los Angeles Times article prophetically headlined: “A Better Path: There Are 12.2 Miles of Abandoned Rail Beds That Could Be Turned Into a Trail for Bikers, Joggers and Walkers From USC to Santa Monica, but There Is Resistance.”

Twenty years later, in 2012, the first section of the Expo Bike Path opened to the public.

The Expo Bike Path connects to the Ballona Creek Bike Path (and Park to Playa Trail) at National Boulevard in Culver City. The connection between the two paths is at the Bike Path Bridge over Ballona Creek; the bridge originally carried the southbound lanes of National until the construction of the E Line overpass and a new four-lane National Boulevard bridge. Between the new and old road bridges, a historic Pacific Electric rail bridge remains intact but fenced off and unused.

== Route ==
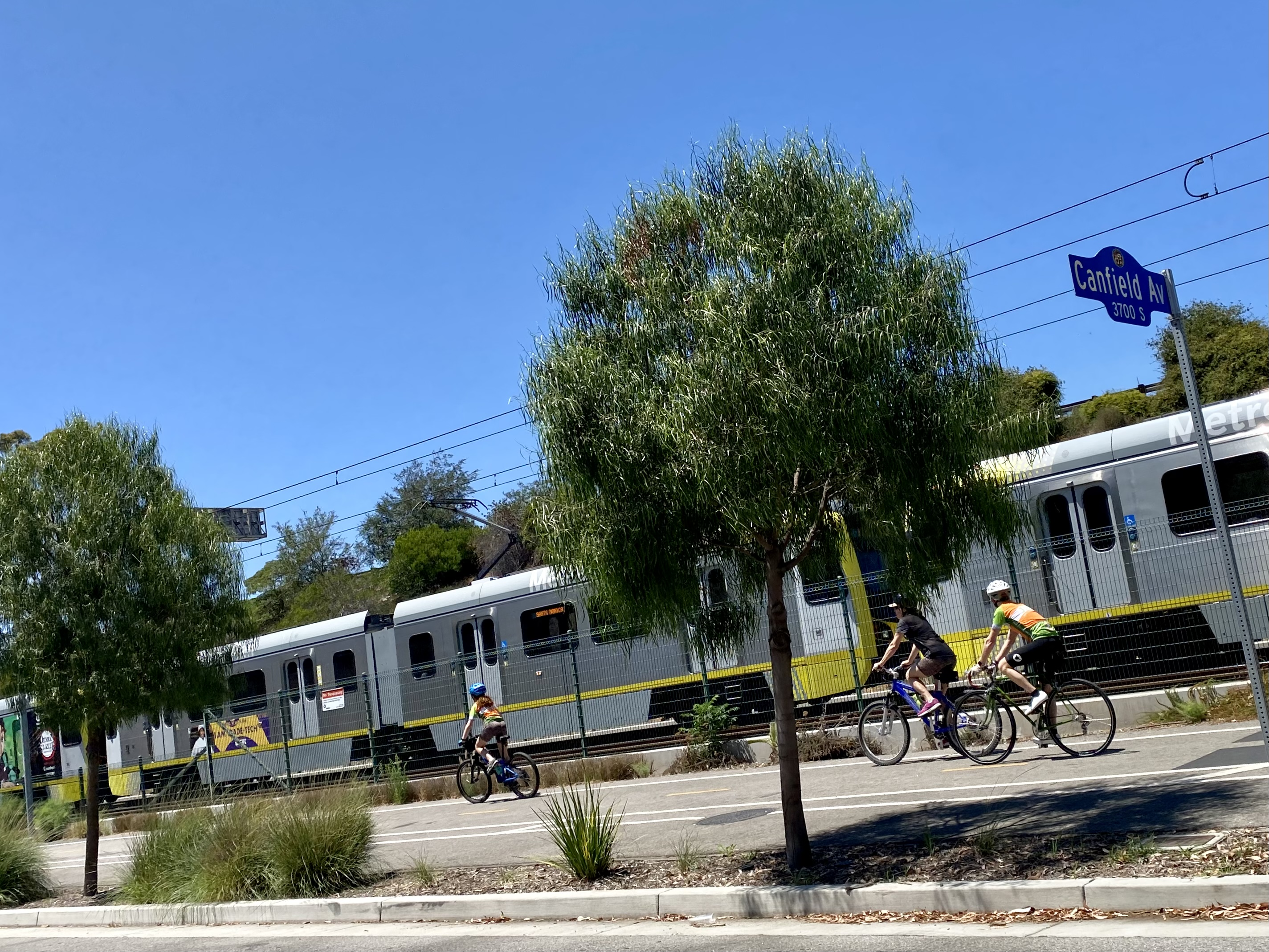
Path between Culver City and Palms stations

- Eastern trailhead coordinates: 34.02627°N 118.37210°W
- Western trailhead coordinates: 34.0236°N 118.4795°W

=== Eastern segment (aka Phase I) ===
- Trailhead: La Cienega/Jefferson
- Trailhead: Culver City, specifically Platform Park at Washington and National under the track
- Distance: 5.6 miles (9.0 km)
- Route: This section is largely a Class III bike route (bicycles share a main road with a car traffic), but there is short separated bike path segment between La Cienega/Jefferson station and the western terminus. There is a dogleg turn on Harcourt Avenue between the 3.4-mile-long (5.5 km) stretch on Jefferson Boulevard. and the 1.2-mile-long (1.9 km) section on La Cienega Boulevard. There is an eastbound crossing of the train tracks at South Gramercy Place. Just before the western end of the Phase I/eastern segment of the Expo Bike Path, there is access to the Ballona Creek Bike Path which continues six miles west to the ocean, connecting to the Marvin Braude Bike Trail.

=== Central segment ===
- Trailhead: Culver City
- Trailhead: Palms, Exposition Boulevard and Palms Boulevard northeast corner
- Distance: 0.8 miles (1.3 km)
- Notes: Separated from traffic except at crossings

=== Western segment (aka Phase II) ===
- Trailhead: Westwood/Rancho Park, corner of Selby Avenue and Exposition Blvd.
- Trailhead: 17th Street/SMC
- Distance: 3.5 miles (5.6 km)
- Notes: Separated from traffic except at crossings “There are good bikeway connections in the area, but people unfamiliar with the vicinity would be well served by [signage] to the beach, the Michigan Avenue Neighborhood Greenway (MANGo), Santa Monica College, and other destinations.”

== Gaps ==
There are two intervals lacking either clear on-street navigation or a separated route.

=== Culver Junction gap ===
- Trailhead: National Boulevard and Wesley Avenue
- Trailhead: Behind Venice Crossroads shopping center
- Distance: 0.5 miles (0.80 km)

=== Northvale gap ===
Sources:

- Trailhead: Palms
- Trailhead: Westwood/Rancho Park
- Route: Northvale Avenue and Overland Avenue or National Boulevard and Westwood Boulevard, passing under Interstate 10
- Distance: 1.6 miles (2.6 km)
- Notes: A plan to close the gap and connect the central and western segments is approved and funded; completion is expected by 2025.

== Access ==
Dedicated parking lots for “park and ride” commuters are available at 17th Street/SMC, Expo/Bundy, Expo/Sepulveda, Culver City, and La Cienega/Jefferson stations.

== Points of interest ==
The origin point of the western segment includes the Westwood Neighborhood Greenway, a linear park completed 2020, that “daylights” the Brown Canyon Creek that had been funneled underground since 1958. The Greenway was built on a railroad right-of-way that was not otherwise occupied by the train tracks or bike route.

There is a bicycle repair shop and a secured bike garage located within the Culver City station at about the halfway point along the route.

== See also ==
- Rails with trails
- California bikeway classifications
- List of Los Angeles bike paths
