= Beach Cities Greenway =

Rail trail in Manhattan Beach and Hermosa Beach, California

Coordinates: 33.9002°N 118.3964°W

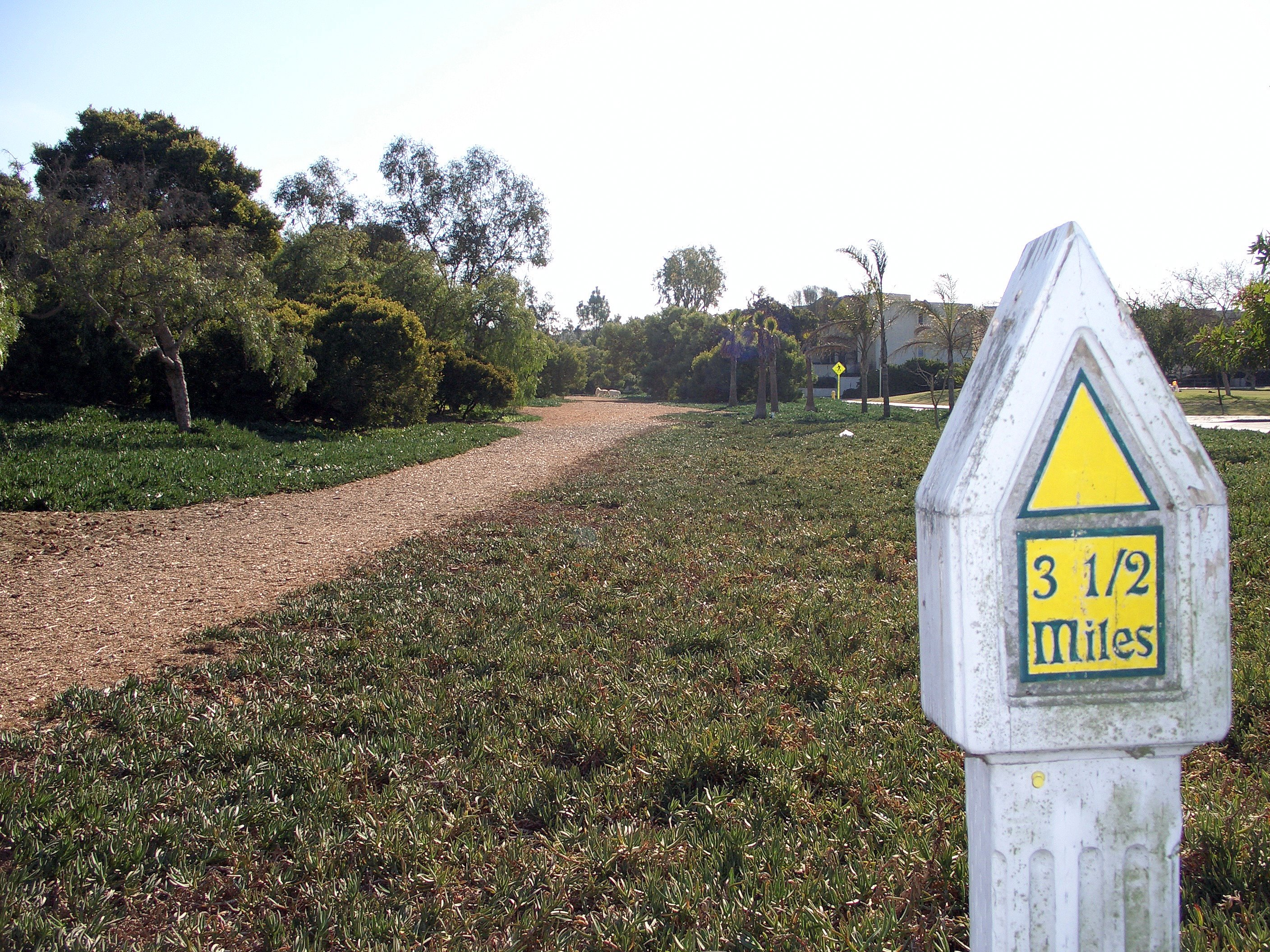
Hermosa Beach chip trail

The Beach Cities Greenway in Manhattan Beach and Hermosa Beach, California is a 3.9-mile (6.3 km) rail trail. The greenway is a linear park on the median between Valley Drive running along the west side and Ardmore Avenue on the east.

Northern trailhead of the Beach Cities greenway is Sepulveda Blvd. and Valley Drive opposite the Manhattan Village shopping center in Manhattan Beach; southern trailhead is Herondo Street and Valley Drive at the Hermosa Beach-Redondo Beach municipal boundary. (Note: Manhattan, Hermosa and Redondo are collectively called the Beach Cities.)

Hermosa's section is officially named the Hermosa Valley Greenbelt. Manhattan Beach's section was called Manhattan Parkway until 1988 when was renamed Veterans Parkway.

The Manhattan Beach section is approximately 21 acres (85,000 m^{2}) in area and 2 miles (3.2 km) long. The Hermosa Beach section is approximately 19 acres (77,000 m^{2}) in area and 1.9 miles (3.1 km) long. The boundary between the two municipalities is approximately the 1st Street crossing but technically occurs “mid-block.”

Popular with joggers and dog walkers, amenities along the trail include quarter-mile markers, outdoor fitness equipment, public art installations, benches and drinking fountains. For those who seek an extended workout, two blocks from the southern terminus of the greenway, down Herondo Street, is the Strand, part of the larger 22-mile (35 km) Coastal Bike Trail along the Pacific Ocean.

Bicycles are not permitted on the greenway. The route is unpaved; locals sometimes call the route “the wood-chip trail.”

== Past ==
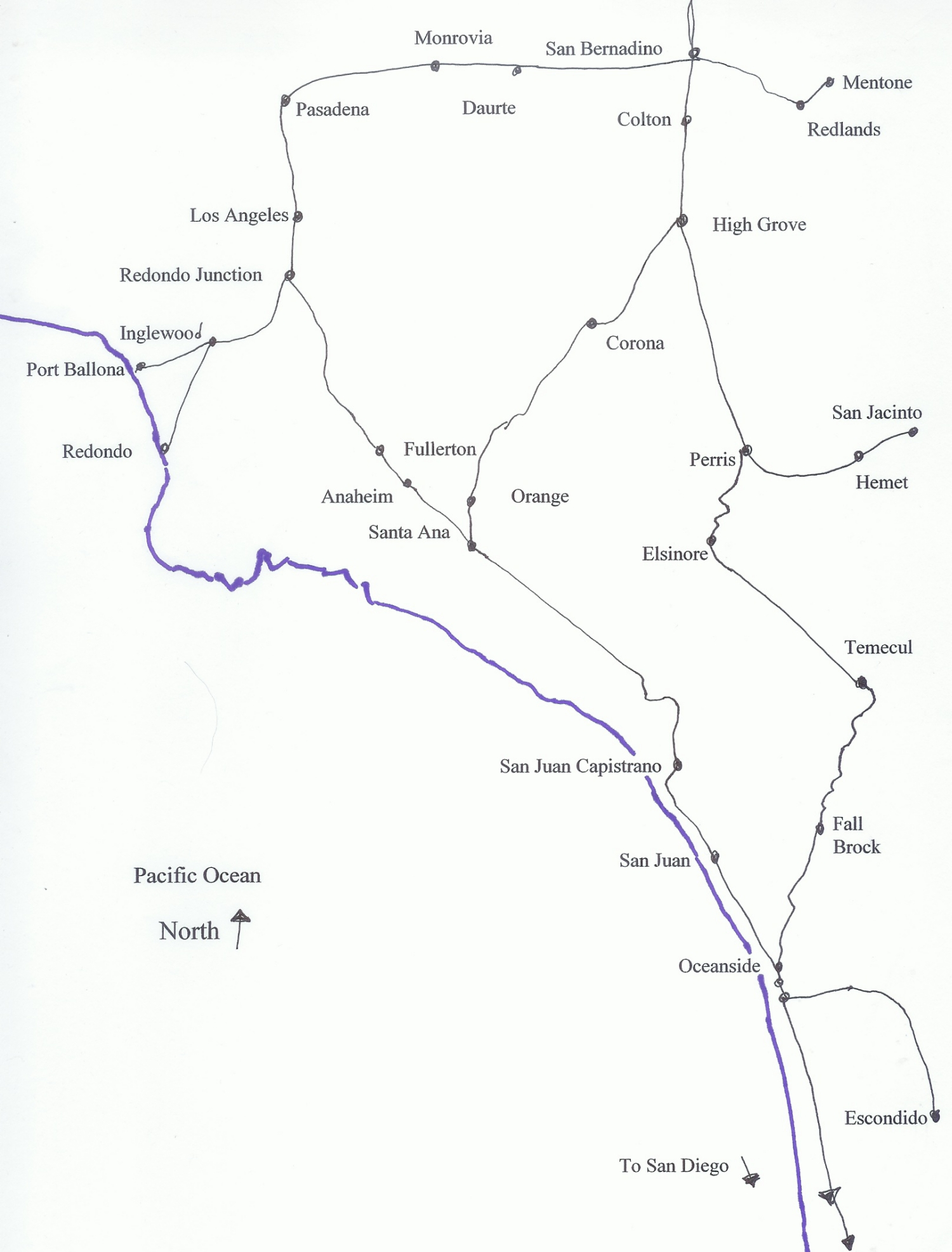
California Central Railway 1888

The Beach Cities greenway is located on a median where the Redondo Branch of the Santa Fe Railroad line once ran from Redondo Junction past Inglewood Depot to Redondo Beach. A depot at Ardmore and Pier Avenue was demolished in the 1960s as the rail route was already languishing, and local residents began guerrilla gardening trees along the easement. The railroad officially abandoned the line in 1983.

Manhattan Beach purchased their section of the right-of-way in 1986; Hermosa Beach did the same in 1988.

== Present ==
Hermosa Beach is planning to make sections of the route more accessible to wheelchair users, initially by replacing wood chips with decomposed granite along a five-block stretch between Pier Avenue and Eighth Street.

Volunteers are working to replace opportunistic vegetation such as ice plant with California native species like sea cliff buckwheat, which is the food plant for the caterpillars of the endangered endemic El Segundo blue butterfly.

== See also ==
- List of Manhattan Beach municipal parks
- The Strand
