= List of parks in Los Angeles County, California =

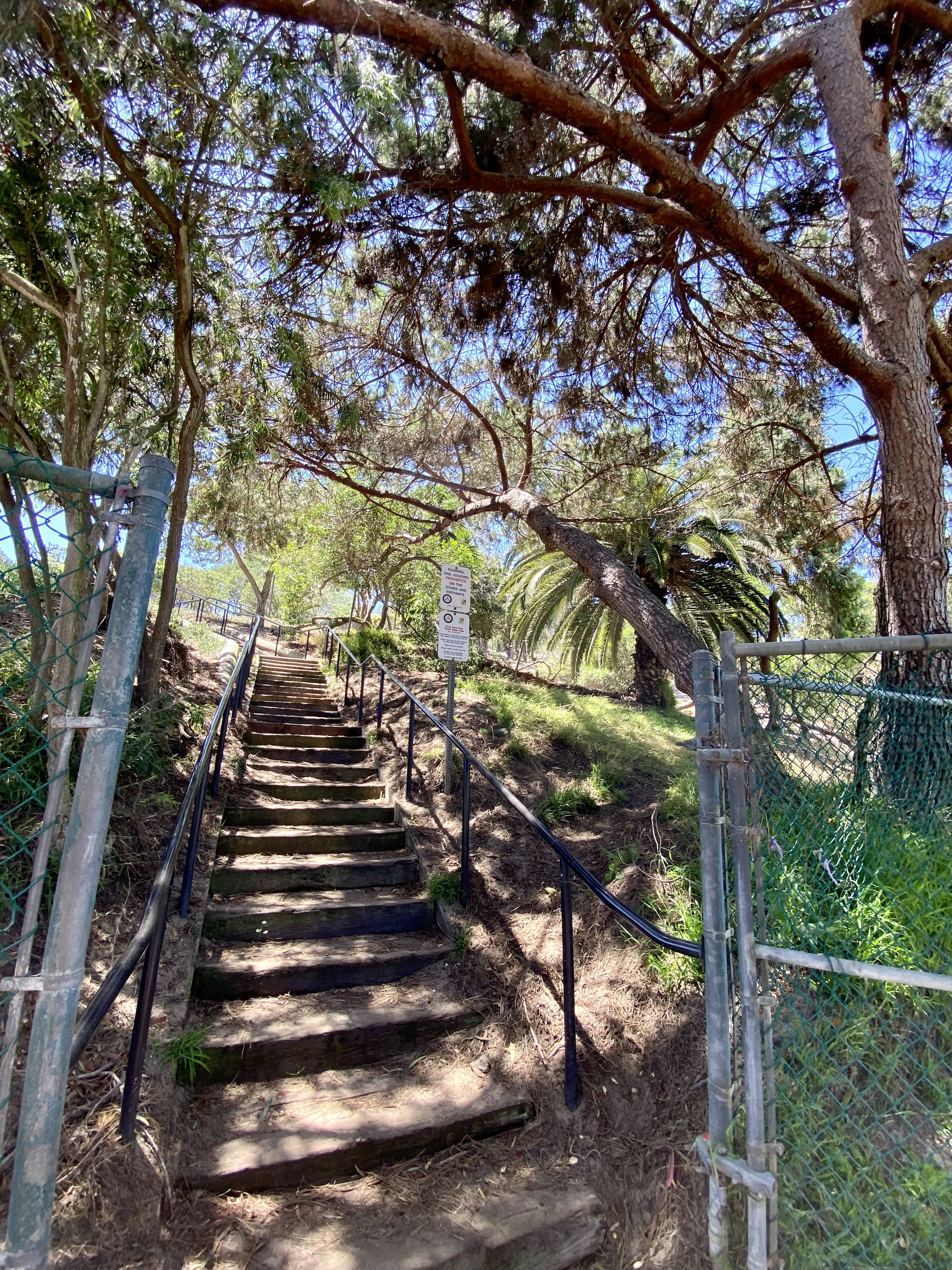
Stairs at Sand Dune Park in Manhattan Beach

This is a list of parks in Los Angeles County, California outside of the city of Los Angeles itself (for those, please see List of parks in Los Angeles).

There are at least 183 parks maintained by Los Angeles County Department of Parks and Recreation, many of which are in unincorporated areas of the county. Some of these are actually owned by the state of California, e.g. Kenneth Hahn State Recreation Area.

Locations of all places having coordinates below may be seen in a map together by clicking upon "Map all coordinates using: OpenStreetMap" at the right of this page.

== State parks in Los Angeles County ==
California state parks that are in Los Angeles County outside of the city of Los Angeles include:

Park name	Classification	Location	Size		Year established	Remarks
Park name	Classification	Location	acres	ha	Year established	Remarks
Antelope Valley California Poppy Reserve	State natural reserve	Los Angeles County; 34.7275°N 118.394722°W	1,781	721	1976	Showcases the state's most-consistent blooms of California poppy, in the high Mojave Desert.
Antelope Valley Indian Museum State Historic Park	State historic park	Los Angeles; 34.650278°N 117.848889°W	397	161	1979	Interprets the Native American cultures of the Great Basin and surrounding regions in a 1928 folk art building on the NRHP.
Arthur B. Ripley Desert Woodland State Park	State park	Los Angeles County; 34.759167°N 118.503056°W	566	229	1993	Preserves a remnant stand of Joshua trees and junipers in the Antelope Valley.
Castaic Lake State Recreation Area	State recreation area	Los Angeles County; 34.55755°N 118.56902°W	4,224	1,709	1965	Features 29 miles (47 km) of shoreline on Castaic Lake.
Hungry Valley State Vehicular Recreation Area	State vehicular recreation area	Los Angeles County and Ventura; 34.79171°N 118.87154°W	18,533	7,500	1978	Offers 130 miles (210 km) of off-highway tracks, connecting to more routes in Los Padres National Forest.
Leo Carrillo State Park	State park	Los Angeles County and Ventura County; 34.044444°N 118.933889°W	2,513	1,017	1953	Honors actor and conservationist Leo Carrillo with a 1.5-mile (2.4 km) beach. Part of Santa Monica Mountains National Recreation Area.
Malibu Creek State Park	State park	Los Angeles County; 34.100833°N 118.711111°W	8,215	3,324	1974	
Malibu Lagoon State Beach	State beach	Malibu, Los Angeles County; 34.033333°N 118.679167°W	110	45	1951	
Pío Pico State Historic Park	State historic park	Whittier; 33.993636°N 118.071075°W	5.5	2.2	1917	
Placerita Canyon State Park	State park	Los Angeles County; 34.375833°N 118.445833°W	342	138	1949	
Point Dume State Beach	State beach	Malibu(?); 34.000872°N 118.806839°W	37	15	1958	
Robert H. Meyer Memorial State Beach	State beach	Malibu; 34.038611°N 118.875°W	37	15	1978	
Saddleback Butte State Park	State park	Los Angeles County; 34.666667°N 117.8°W	2,954	1,195	1957	
Santa Monica State Beach	State beach	Santa Monica; 34.015°N 118.501667°W	48	19	1948	Operated by City of Santa Monica
Santa Susana Pass State Historic Park	State historic park	Los Angeles County and Ventura County; 34.256667°N 118.620556°W	671	272	1979	
Topanga State Park	State park	Los Angeles County; 34.095278°N 118.548889°W	12,666	5,126	1967	
Verdugo Mountains	Park property	unincorporated Los Angeles County, Glendale, Pasadena and La Cañada Flintridge; as well as the City of Los Angeles neighborhood of Sunland-Tujunga; 34.216667°N 118.283333°W	251	102	1984	

== Arcadia municipal parks ==
- Arcadia County Park

== Beverly Hills municipal parks ==
- Beverly Cañon Gardens
- Beverly Gardens Park
- Franklin Canyon Park
- La Cienega Park
- Roxbury Memorial Park
- Will Rogers Memorial Park

== Long Beach municipal parks ==
- El Dorado Park

== Manhattan Beach municipal parks ==
Manhattan Beach is an incorporated city in western Los Angeles County, California; its municipal parks include:

- Bruce’s Beach
- Live Oak Park
- Manhattan Heights Park
- Manhattan Village Park
- Marine Avenue Park
- Polliwog Park, with Manhattan Beach Botanical Garden
- Sand Dune Park
- Veterans Parkway

Its pocket parks include:

- Eighth Street Parquette
- Larsson Street Parquette

== Torrance municipal parks ==
- Columbia Park

== West Hollywood municipal parks ==
- Plummer Park

== See also ==
- List of California state parks
- List of parks in Los Angeles
