= Marvin Braude Bike Trail =

Bike path in Los Angeles County, California, United States

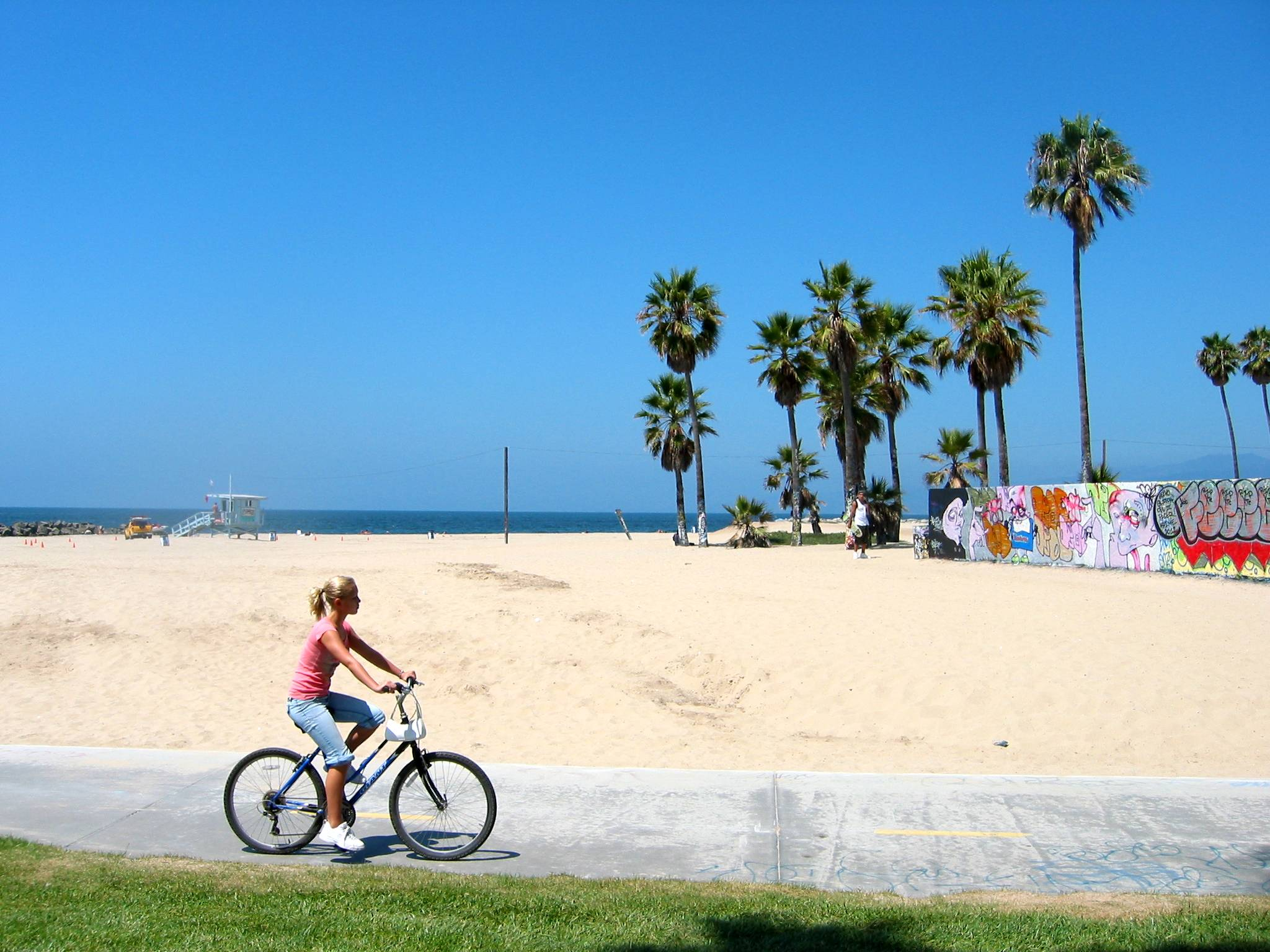
- Beach Bike Path
- Length: 22.3 mi (35.9 km)
- Location: Los Angeles County, California
- Established: 1974
- Completed: 1989
- Trailheads: Will Rogers State Beach
- Use: Mixed
- Difficulty: Moderate
- Website: beaches.lacounty.gov

Trail map
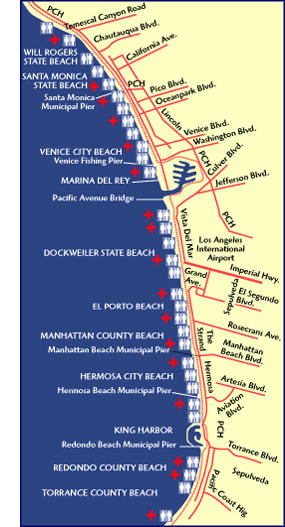

The Marvin Braude Bike Trail (also known as the Beach Bike Path, Coastal Bike Trail, The Strand, or the South Bay Bicycle Trail) is a 22-mile (35 km) paved bicycle path that runs mostly along the shoreline of Santa Monica Bay in Los Angeles County, California. The coastal bike trail is widely acknowledged as "the most popular bike path" in Los Angeles.

The path "leads cyclists past colorful piers, lively crowds, and beach vistas unseen by automobile travelers".

A 1985 bike touring guidebook reported that this was "deservedly the most popular (and most crowded) bike path in Los Angeles County. Riders see exhilarating views of the Pacific Ocean, fleets of weekend sailors, and, on a clear day, Catalina Island riding on the horizon".

According to one guide to recreational biking in Los Angeles, "If you make the path a part of your morning workout routine, you'll see sunbeams lighting up the white crests of waves as they break, surfers getting the first rides of the day, and assorted marine life bobbing in and around the shoreline."

For most of its length the concrete route is 14 feet (4.3 m) wide. The northern terminus of the trail is at Will Rogers State Beach in Pacific Palisades, Los Angeles. The southern terminus of the trail is in Torrance County Beach in Torrance, at the base of Palos Verdes Peninsula.

County officials reported that at the time the trail was completed (in 1989), as many as 10,000 people a day used the route.

For most of the trail, the bicycle path is Class I (no automobile contact) but for a few miles in Marina del Rey, the route is Class II where the bicycle route crosses six streets with automobiles and nearby traffic lights, adding moderate danger for bicyclists, pedestrians, roller skaters, and skateboarders.

Near the midpoint, between the two ends of the path, this coastal bicycle path intersects with another Class I bicycle path, with abundant wildlife viewing opportunities, known as the Ballona Creek Bike Path. This urban river bicycle path goes inland for approximately 7 miles (11 km) into Culver City, and there connecting to the Expo Bike Path (ending at the La Cienega/Jefferson Los Angeles Metro Rail station) and the Park to Playa Trail (ending in the Baldwin Hills).

== Route ==
The path begins in Will Rogers State Beach in the Pacific Palisades area of the city of Los Angeles.

The Santa Monica portion of the path is an 8.5-mile (13.7 km) Class 1 path in Los Angeles County running from Temescal Canyon.

It continues southbound along the beach and passes through Santa Monica State Beach in the city of Santa Monica, where the path passes underneath the Santa Monica Pier. This stretch hosts almost 5,000 parking spaces for visitors.

The path then passes through in Venice Beach. According to a guide to traveling along the bay on foot, "Venice is one of the county's oldest beaches; lifeguard service has been provided since the 1920s. The quiet of this beach is a marked contrast to the hubbub of Ocean Front Walk paralleling the length of it. Almost every facet of zany California beach culture can be found on the boardwalk-jugglers, mimes, skaters and more sidewalk cafes, junk- and health-food eateries than one could sample in a year of Sundays."

The Class I bicycle path ends at the Venice Fishing Pier and riders must continue .75 miles on the Class II bicycle path along Washington Boulevard.

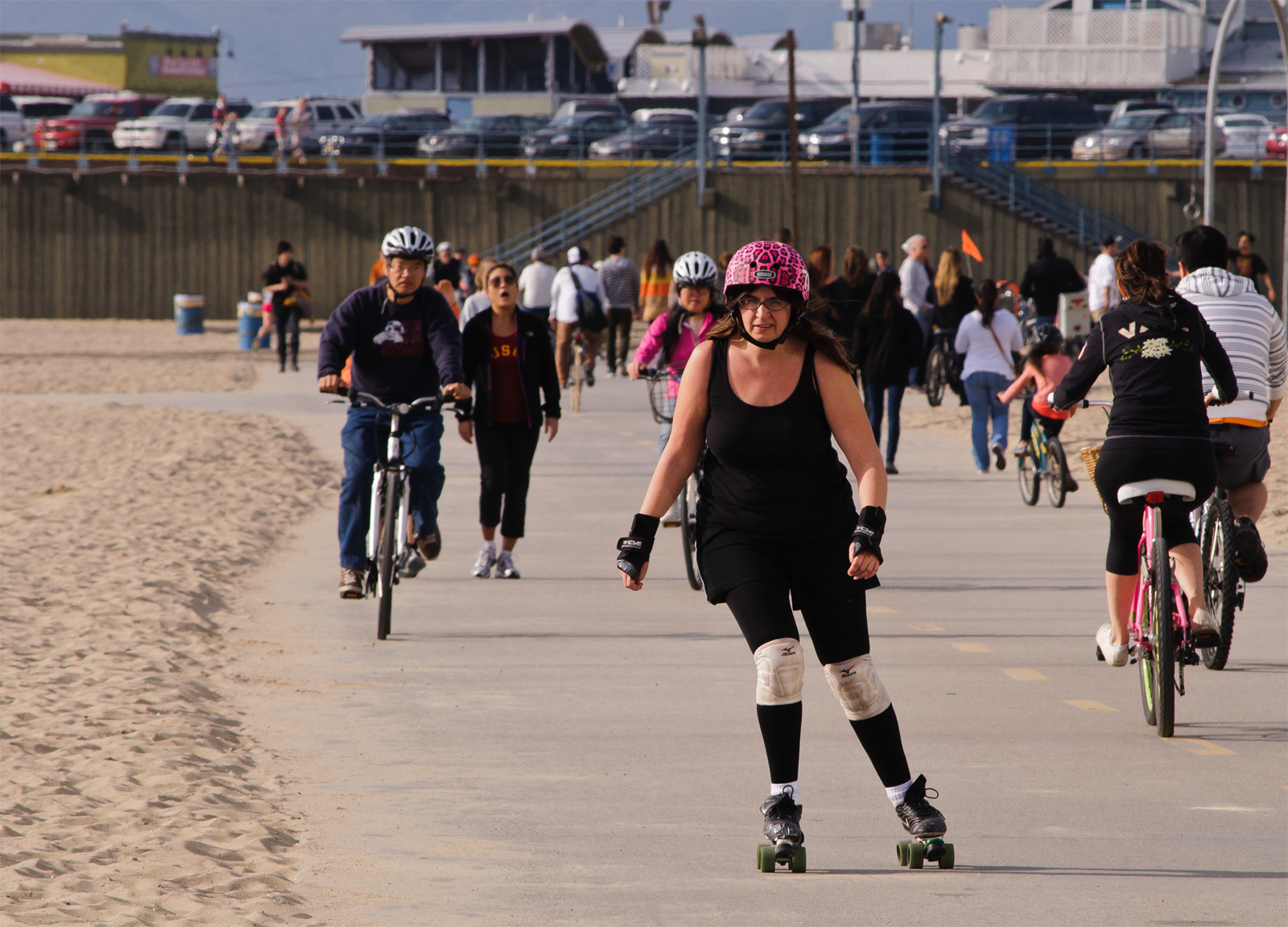
Santa Monica Beach Bike Path

The Class II path eventually veers off of Washington Boulevard and takes riders around Marina Del Rey following a bike route and walkway crossing Admiralty Way. (At Admiralty and Washington riders can take an optional 0.7 detour loop around the Oxford Basin wildlife viewing area.) The path then wends past various boat basins and Fisherman's Village until it reaches a Class II path running alongside the main channel of the marina, an extension of the Ballona Creek Bike Path.

Below Marina Del Rey and Ballona Creek the path is called the South Bay Bike Trail, "The route follows a flat, curving path that snakes among the dunes of Dockweiler Beach State Park; in Manhattan Beach it's more like a broad boardwalk, and near King Harbor it's commercial—you'll have to dismount for part of the way through this busy shopping area."

The path continues south through Playa Del Rey to Dockweiler State Beach (which abuts Los Angeles International Airport and the city of El Segundo), "which is wide, clean, sandy and mostly pleasant".

Next comes El Porto Beach and Manhattan County Beach (both part of the city of Manhattan Beach).

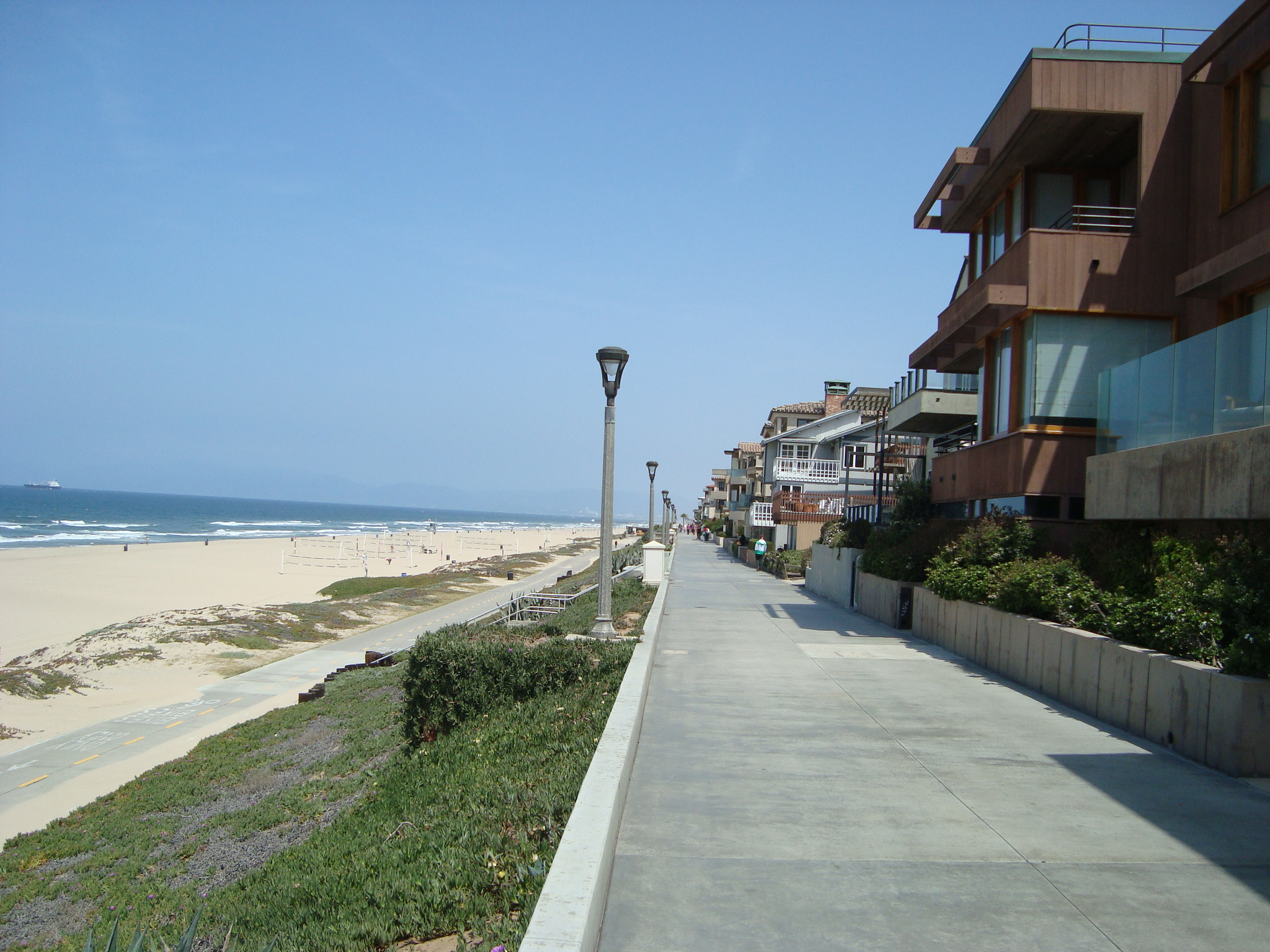
Bike trail in Manhattan Beach

In Hermosa Beach, riders have the choice of either continuing along the Class II bicycle path that runs alongside Hermosa Beach (which can get quite busy with pedestrian foot traffic, especially during the summer months) or riding on a Class II bicycle lane that runs parallel to Hermosa Avenue. The scenic bike path/pedestrian trail that runs alongside the beach in Hermosa Beach was established in 1908 and is known as The Strand. At Herondo Street, people can go two blocks inland to connect with the Beach Cities Greenway.

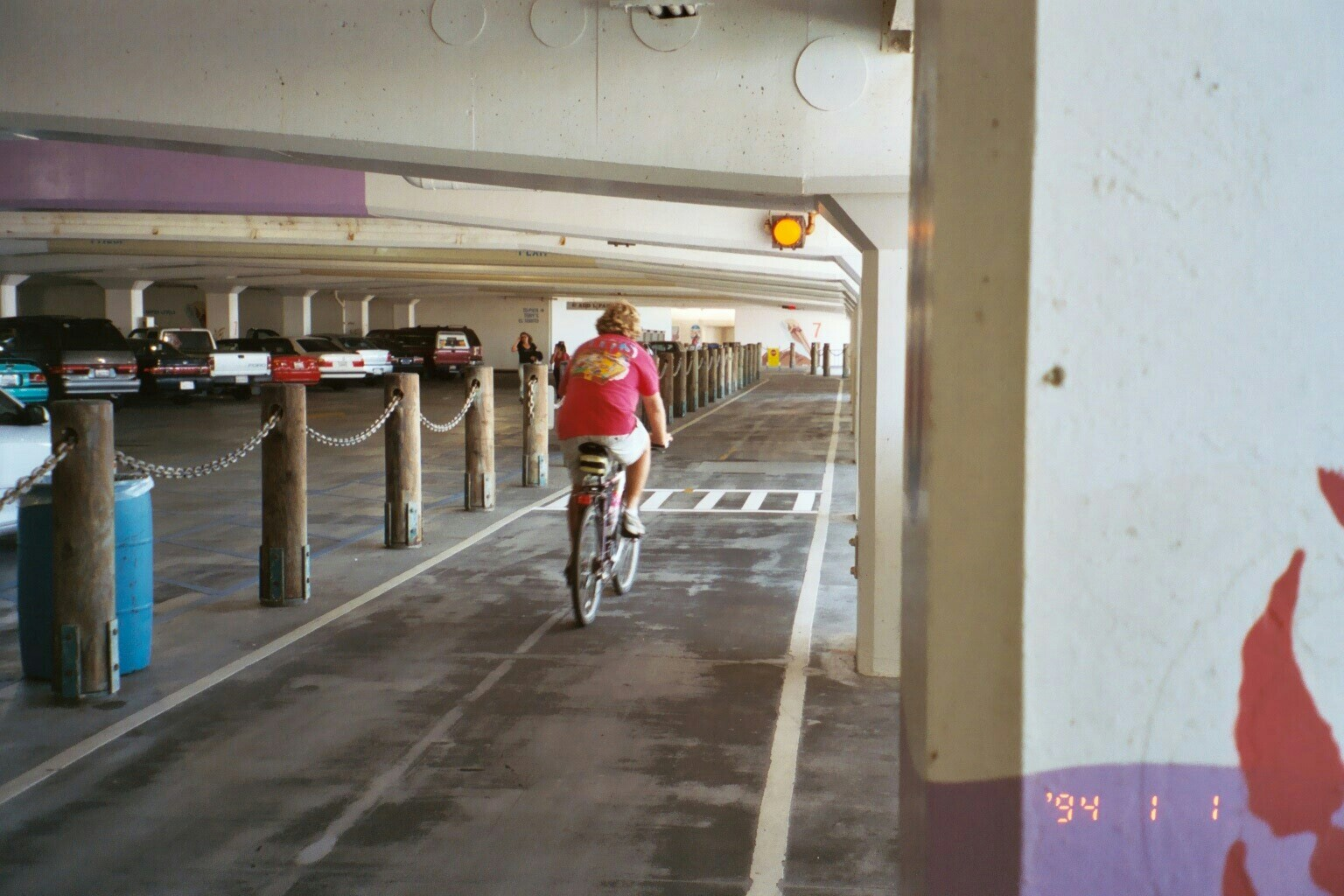
Redondo Beach parking lot segment

The path continues along the beach through Redondo County Beach in the city of Redondo Beach. The path passes through the parking structure of the Redondo Beach pier. Signs instruct riders to dismount and walk their bikes across the main entrance to the pier and the King Harbor marina. Pedestrians and walked bikes can also "dawdle along the walkways around the boat basins".

The path ends in Torrance Beach, below a parking lot at the base of the Palos Verdes Peninsula hills. According to a guide to walking the entirety of Santa Monica Bay, "One of many ways to reach the trail head at Torrance County Beach is by exiting the San Diego Freeway in Carson, on Torrance Boulevard, and traveling six miles west to Catalina Avenue. Turn left, then almost immediately veer coastward on Esplanade, which takes you 1 1/2 miles to Miramar Park, where there's bluff-top parking ($4 per day) and stairs leading down to the beach."

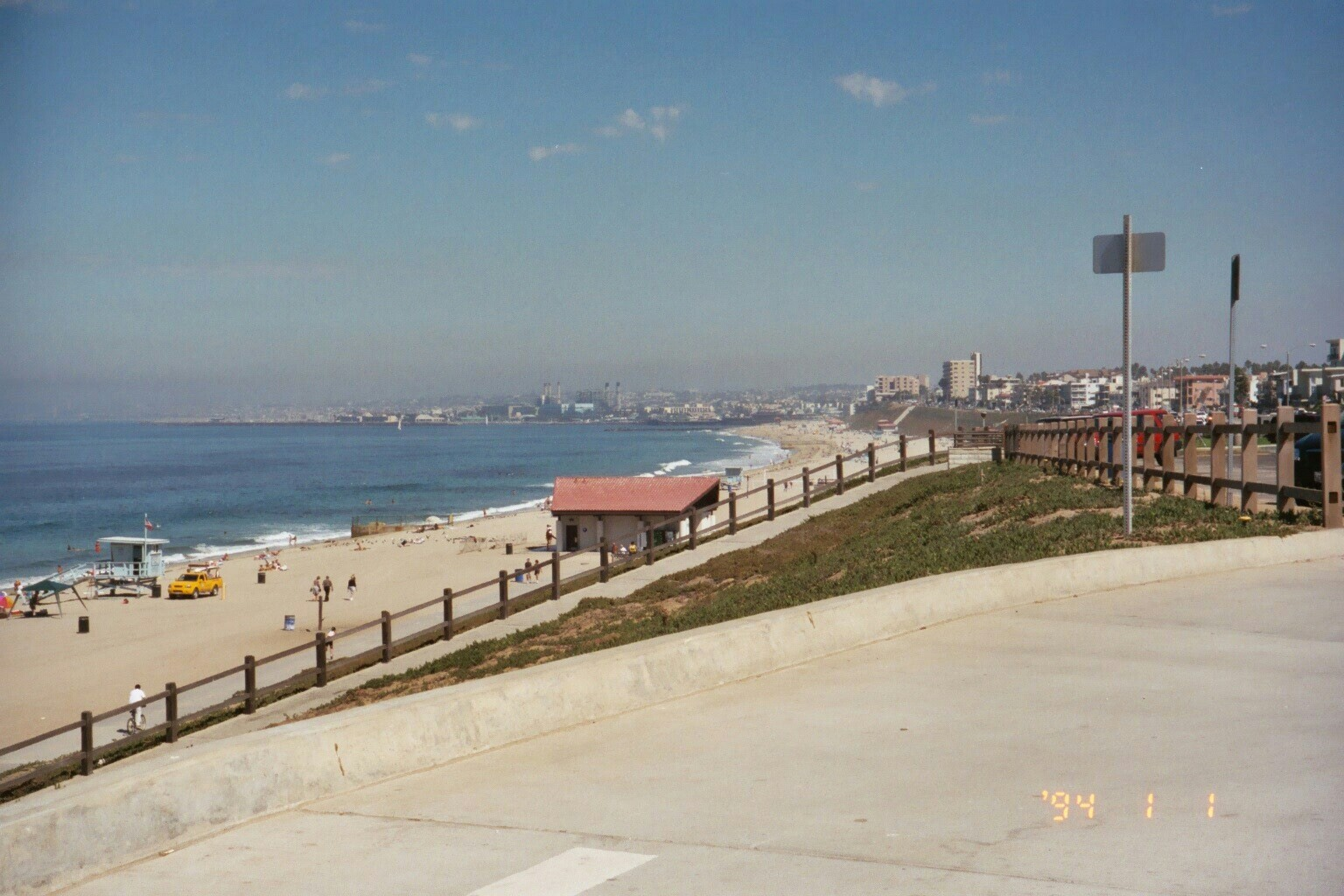
South end of Los Angeles Beach Bike Path

== Access ==
The beach bike path can be accessed via multiple transit links. Most local bus lines have bike racks attached the front of the bus. Bikes are permitted in Metro light rail cars.

- Santa Monica: Travel via E Line to the western terminus at Downtown Santa Monica station. "Go southwest on the protected bike lane on Colorado Avenue. Cross Ocean Avenue and go left/south on the sidewalk. Cross Moomat Ahiko (basically a PCH on-ramp), then turn right down Seaside Terrace, which ends at Ocean Front Walk."
- Marina Del Rey: Culver CityBus line 7 ending at Fiji Way.

== History ==
Realizing the success of paved bike paths in Europe, in the 1890s L.A. city planners proposed a bike path from Los Angeles to Santa Monica. The cost for the path was estimated at $200 per mile, with agreements from local farmers to allow the path to run across their lands.

The current path was proposed in the late 1960s—the Los Angeles Times reported "Chamber Studies Plan for Bikeway in Venice" in 1967–and was approved by L.A. County Supervisors in 1971.

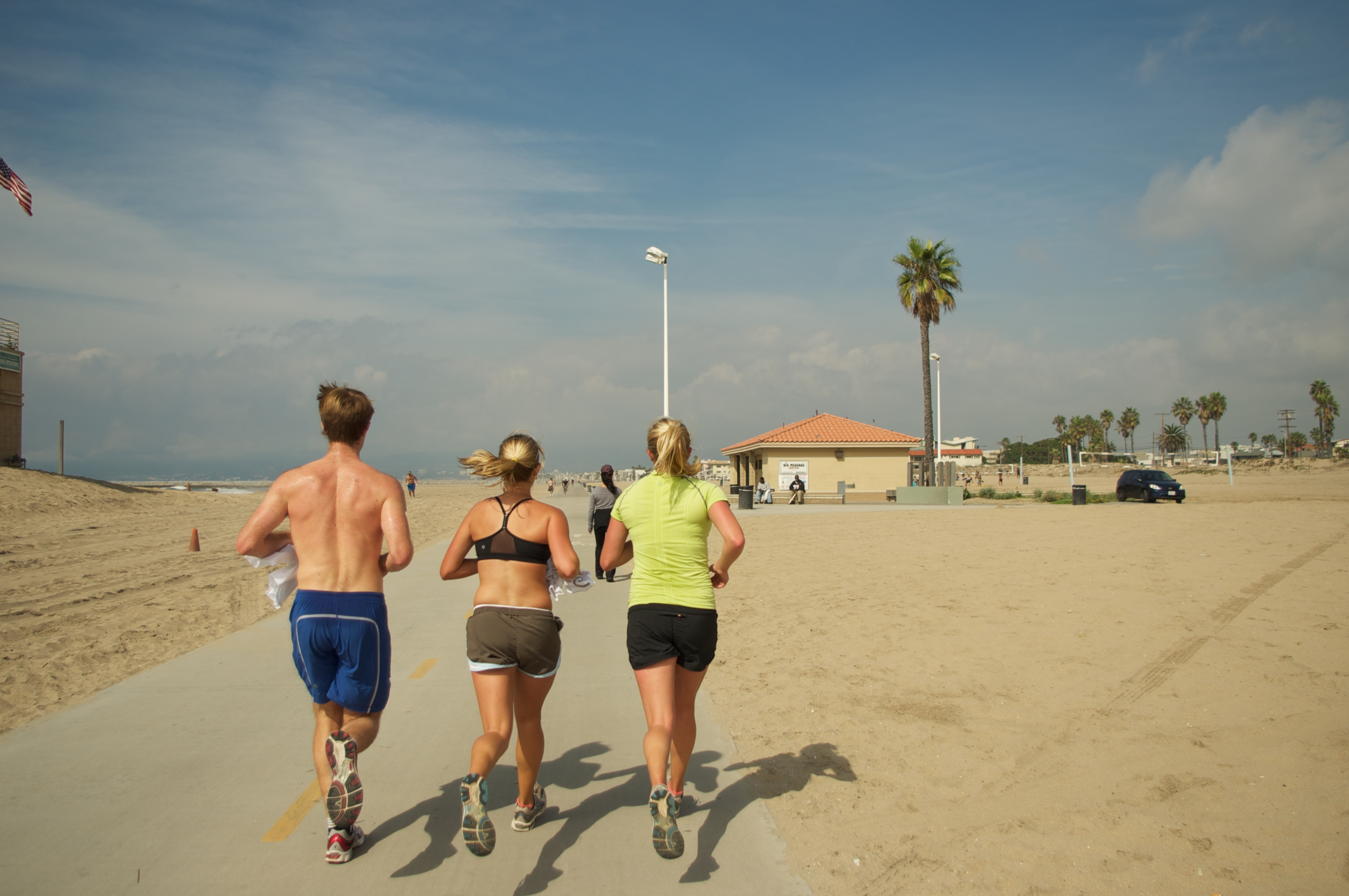
Joggers on the path

Initial gaps in the route, which was otherwise largely complete by 1974, were in Marina Del Rey and Santa Monica, Hermosa and Redondo Beach. At the Marina, "proposed route around basins F, G, and H, and established route on Ballona Creek jetty are separated by locked gate at Via Venetia apartments". The L.A. Times reported "strip may be acquired". At Playa Del Rey there was a gap between the Pacific Avenue Bridge and Culver Blvd., and in Santa Monica the section near "the abandoned Pacific Ocean Park amusement complex, the Synanon headquarters [at Casa del Mar], and the Santa Monica Pier" was deemed "geographically impassable".

There was also talk about routing the Hermosa section entirely inland to Hermosa Avenue or Valley Drive, and sections of the Redondo portion were disconnected because of problems with "its Redevelopment Agency and harbor-area lessees".

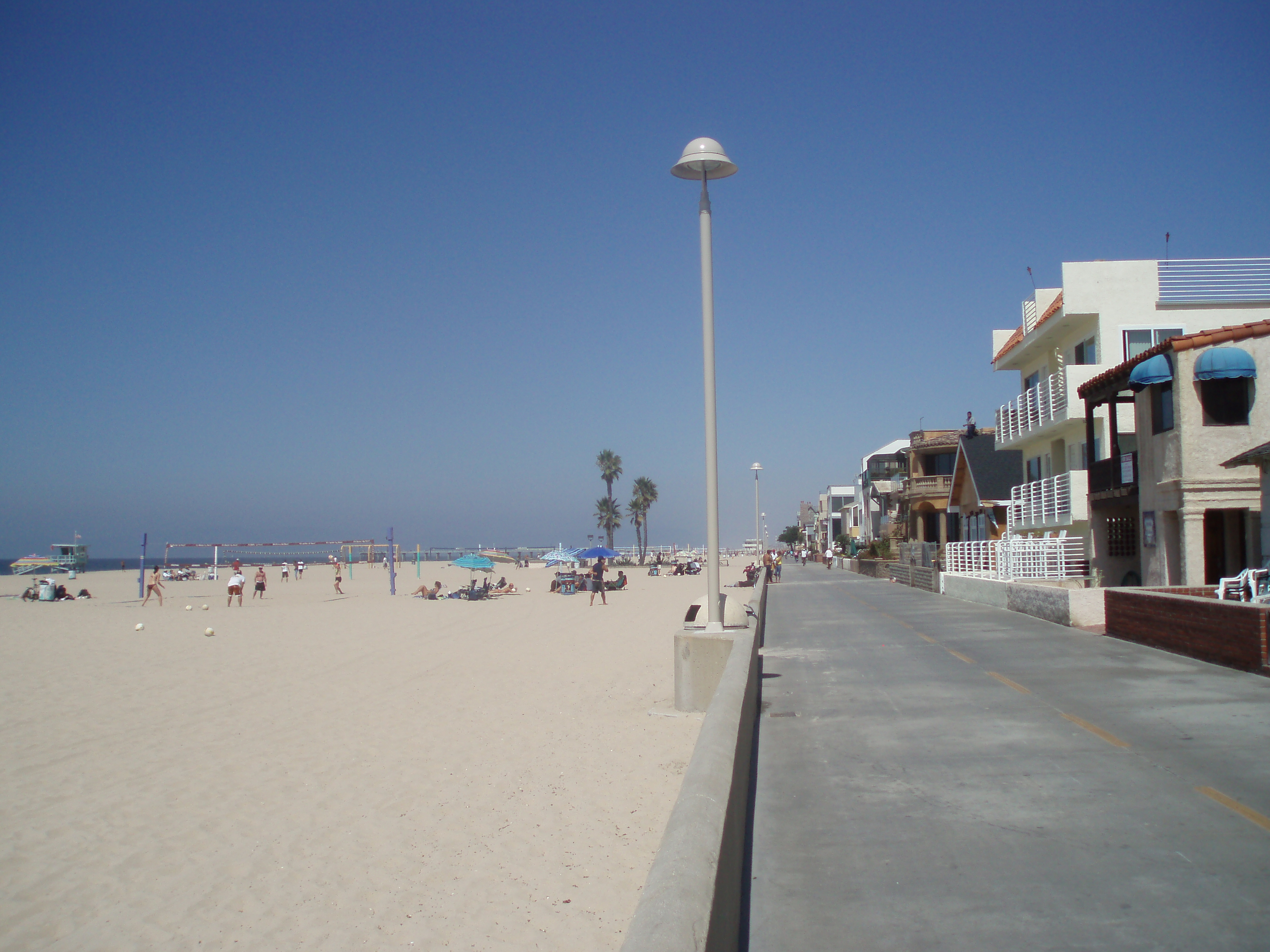
The Strand in Hermosa Beach, looking north

The entire path is along the beach and was adamantly opposed by beachfront homeowners, who managed for two decades to stop the path from reaching Santa Monica.

The mile-and-half segment between California Avenue to Chautauqua Boulevard in the Pacific Palisades was added in 1985. The last section of the path was opened in 1989.

The Marvin Braude bicycle trail was officially named in 2006 for Los Angeles City Councilman Marvin Braude and dedicated by State Senator Sheila Kuehl.

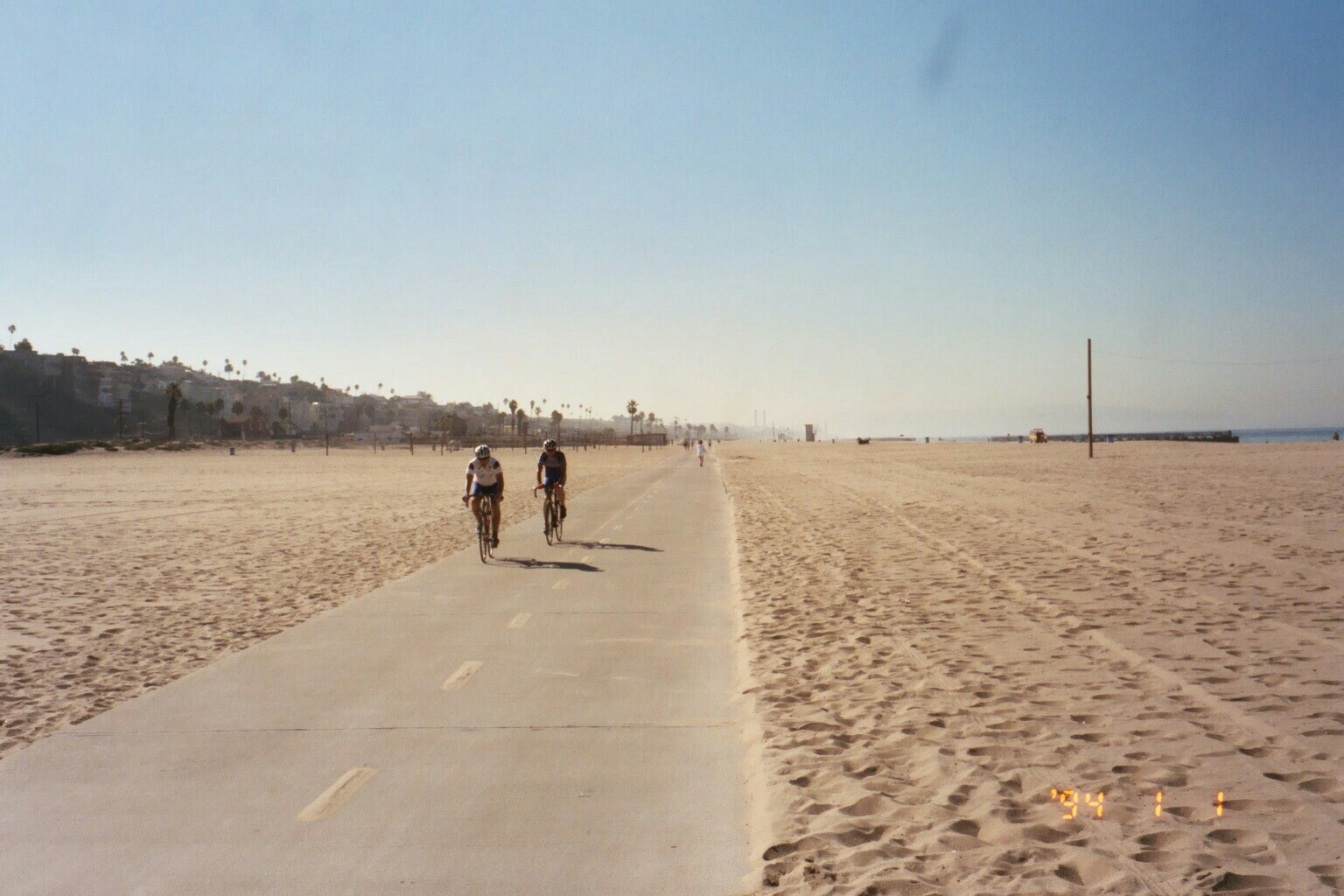
Beach Bike Path

== See also ==
- Los Angeles bike paths
- Shoreline Pedestrian Bikepath (Long Beach, Calif.)
- California Coastal Trail
- Park to Playa Trail
- Backbone Trail
- Ballona Creek Bike Path
- Beach Cities Greenway
