= Lagoons of California =

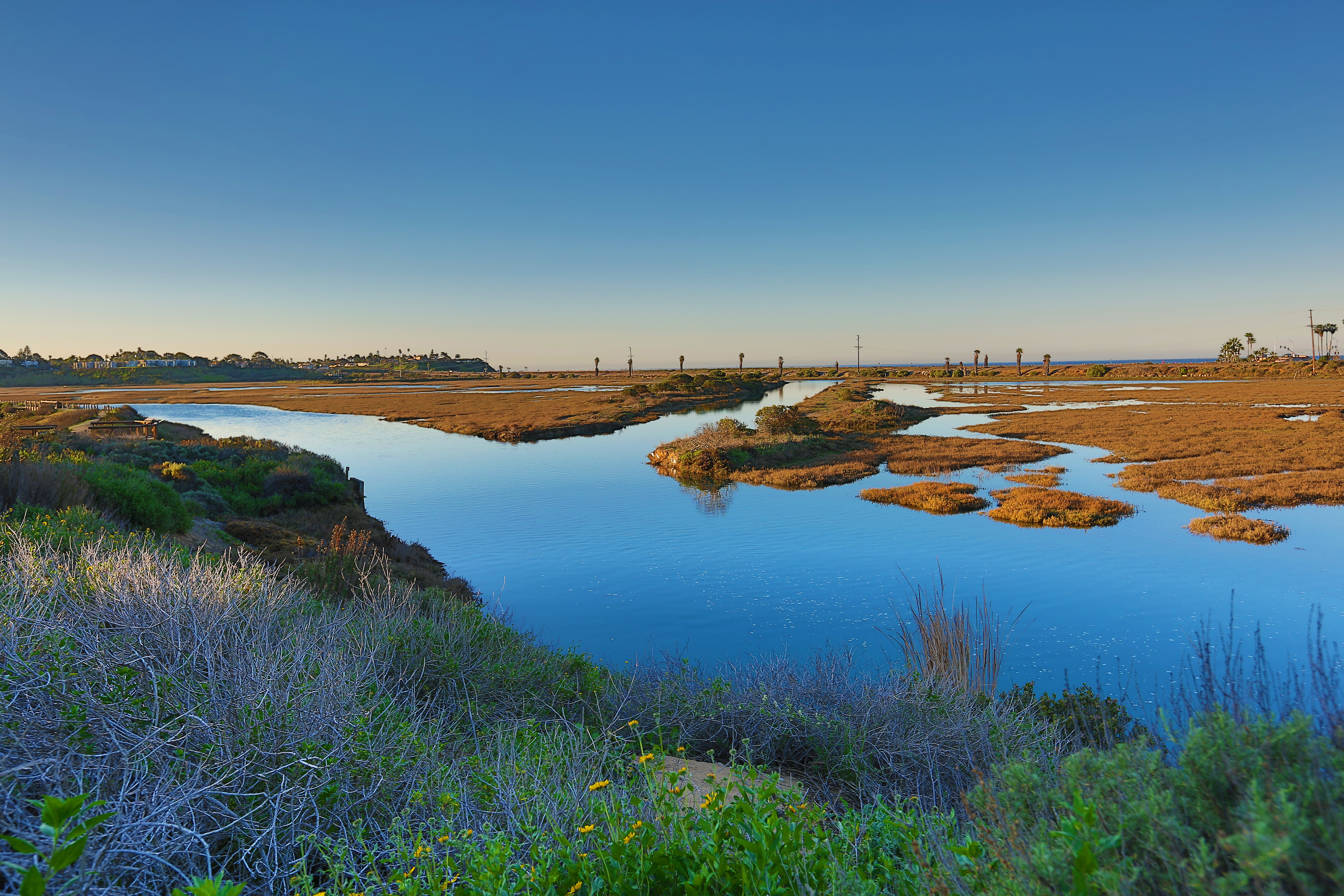
San Elijo Lagoon in San Diego County, California

This is a list of lagoons of California in the United States. According to the Oxford Dictionary of Ecology and Conservation a lagoon is "a body of shallow water with access to a larger body (such as the ocean) that is restricted by a coral reef or sandbar." Lagoons in Southern California tend to be estuarine bodies with depths of 2 m (6.6 ft) or less. After more than a century of severe ecological disruption, many of California's lagoons have been targeted for restoration, including San Elijo, Malibu, Colorado, and several others.

== A–F ==
- Abbotts Lagoon
- Agua Hedionda Lagoon
- Aquatic Park (Berkeley)
- Batiquitos Lagoon
- Ballona Lagoon
- Belvedere Lagoon
- Big Lagoon (California)
- Bolinas Lagoon
- Bolsa Bay or Bolsa Chica or Bolsa Chica Lagoon
- Buena Vista Lagoon
- Colorado Lagoon
- Del Rey Lagoon
- Diablo Canyon or Diablo Canyon Lagoon
- Drakes Estero
- Elkhorn Slough
- Freshwater Lagoon
- Famosa Slough State Marine Conservation Area

== G–O ==
- Goleta Slough
- Halcyon Lagoon
- Humboldt Bay
- Humboldt Lagoons State Park
- Las Flores or Las Flores Lagoon
- Lake Earl
- Lake Merritt
- Los Peñasquitos Lagoon
- Malibu Lagoon
- Mission Bay (San Diego)
- Morro Bay or Morro Bay Lagoon
- Moss Landing
- Mugu Lagoon
- Neary Lagoon
- Newport Bay or Newport Bay Lagoon or Upper Newport Bay State Marine Conservation Area
- Oxford Basin

== P–Z ==
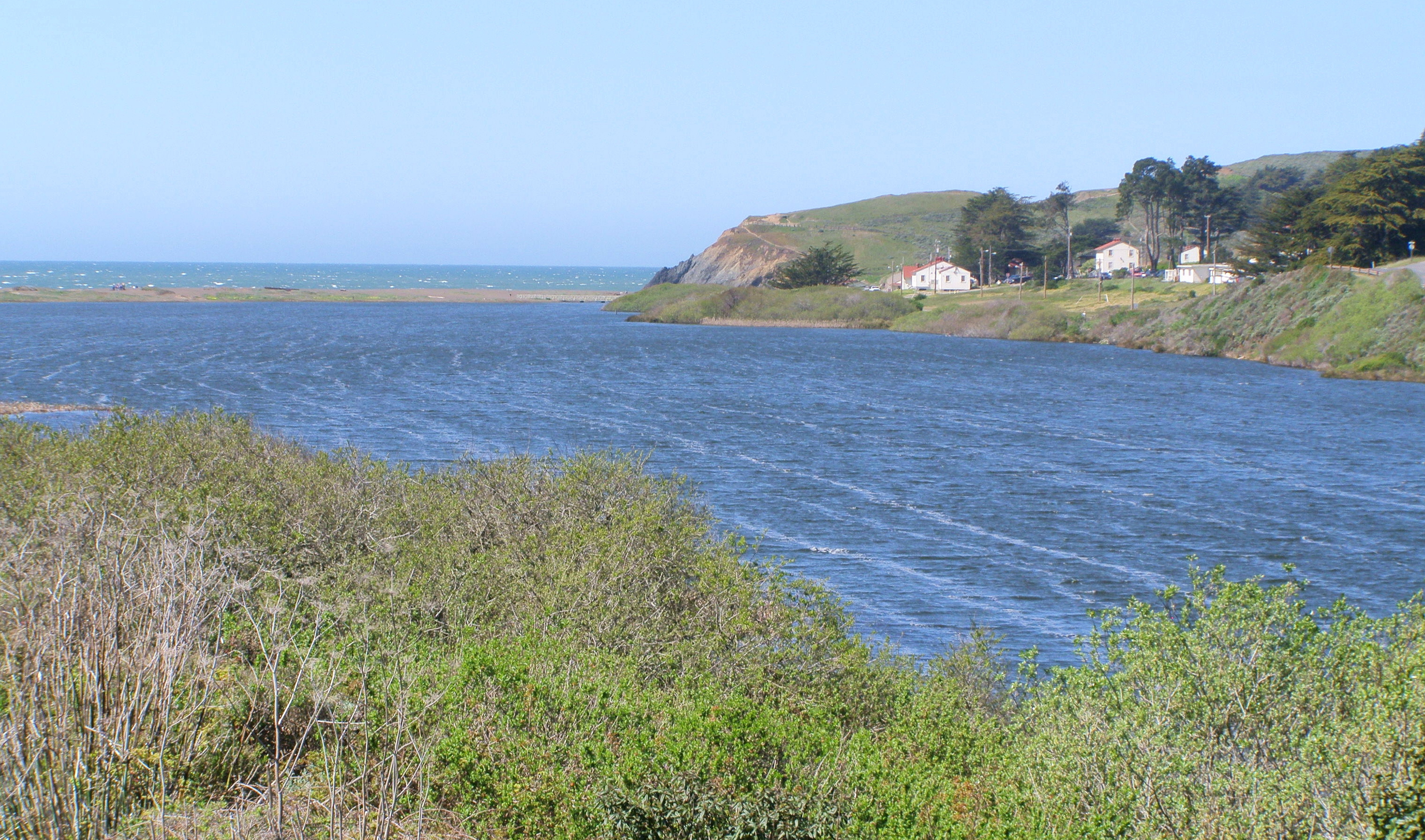
Rodeo Lagoon in Marin County

- Rodeo Lagoon
- San Mateo Lagoon
- Santa Margarita Marsh
- San Luis Rey or San Luis Rey Lagoon
- San Elijo Lagoon
- San Dieguito Lagoon or San Dieguito Lagoon State Marine Conservation Area
- San Diego Bay or San Diego Bay Lagoon
- San Elijo Lagoon
- Stone Lagoon
- Strawberry Lagoon
- Tijuana Lagoon or Tijuana River Estuary (see also Tijuana Slough National Wildlife Refuge)
- Younger Lagoon Reserve
