= Venice of America =

Venice of America may refer to the following places:

- Original name of Venice, Los Angeles and the Venice Canal Historic District, in California
- Nickname of Fort Lauderdale, Florida
- Nickname of Cape Coral, Florida
- Nickname of Holyoke, Massachusetts, particularly its downtown, which contains the Holyoke Canal System
- Nickname of Lowell, Massachusetts
- Nickname of Recife, Brazil, also called "Brazilian Venice"
