= North Coast Corridor =

The North Coast Corridor is an infrastructure improvement project in northern San Diego County, California, intended to upgrade road, rail, pedestrian, and bicycle transportation infrastructure, as well as fund environmental restoration. The project has a $6 billion budget, and after beginning the first phases of construction in late 2016 is planned to be completed over the following 40 years.

== First phase ==
The $700 million initial phase of construction began in 2016 with a groundbreaking on November 29 at San Elijo Lagoon. The projects in this phase are scheduled to be completed by 2021. The state government is contributing $250 million to this project, mostly coming from the fuel tax levied by SB1, known as the Road Repair and Accountability Act.

=== Highway ===
Two new bridges are to be built on Interstate 5: one across the San Elijo Lagoon in Solana Beach and Encinitas, and one across Batiquitos Lagoon in Carlsbad. Other road projects include added carpool lanes and sound barriers. The total cost of the highway portion of the first phase was budgeted for $480 million. The highway expansion faces opposition from environmentalists, who argue that "expanding the amount of space we dedicate to cars not only fails to speed up traffic but also accelerates the breakdown of ecosystems that support life on earth."

=== Rail ===
Two segments of the major passenger rail line following the coast from San Diego north, used by Coaster commuter trains and Pacific Surfliner inter-city trains, are to be double tracked. Work began initially on a 2.4 kilometres (1.5 mi) segment of track between Cardiff-by-the-Sea and San Elijo Lagoon, including replacement of the railroad bridge over the lagoon. The wooden trestle crossing San Elijo Lagoon was demolished in 2018, after 74 years in service, and was replaced by a modern double-track concrete structure. The wooden trestle had been built in 1944, replacing one built in 1880.

Work is ongoing on a similar project at Batiquitos Lagoon, including a bridge replacement and 1.2 kilometres (0.75 mi) of new double track. These projects, as well as grade crossing work, are budgeted for $102 million.

This railway line was originally known as the Surf Line built in the 1880s by the California Southern Railroad, which became part of the Atchison, Topeka and Santa Fe Railway. It is currently part of the LOSSAN Corridor, which forms the route of the Pacific Surfliner. The upgrades to the North Coast Corridor are being done in conjunction with the extension of the San Diego Trolley's Blue Line to UC San Diego, which is known as the Mid-Coast Corridor.

=== Other transportation ===
$40 million is to be spent on bicycle path and pedestrian improvements, along with local community enhancements.

=== Environment ===
San Elijo Lagoon will receive $80 million for restoration efforts, such as dredging and filling to bring sediment to natural levels, as well as additional conserved area to mitigate the impact of the new road and rail bridges. This work is scheduled to begin in 2017.
