= Park Hyatt Resort Aviara =

Hotel and resort in Carlsbad, California

Park Hyatt Aviara Resort, Golf Club & Spa
- Interactive map of the Park Hyatt Aviara Resort, Golf Club & Spa area
- Hotel chain: Hyatt Hotels Corporation

General information
- Location: 7100 Aviara Resort Drive; Carlsbad, California, 92011; United States
- Coordinates: 33.0995798°N 117.2877585°W
- Opening: June 21, 2010
- Operator: Hyatt Hotels Corporation

Technical details
- Floor count: 5

Other information
- Number of rooms: 327
- Number of suites: 43
- Number of restaurants: 6 (Aviara Market, Ember and Rye, Pacific Point, Ponto Lago, Topgolf Swing Suite, Waters' Edge)

Website
- https://www.hyatt.com/en-US/hotel/california/park-hyatt-aviara-resort/sanpa

The Park Hyatt Aviara Resort, officially the Park Hyatt Aviara Resort, Golf Club & Spa, is a AAA Five-Diamond luxury hotel and resort in Carlsbad, California, United States. It is located in the Aviara neighborhood of Carlsbad and is situated above Batiquitos Lagoon. The resort opened on June 21, 2010 and features several pools, meeting rooms and ballrooms, restaurants, a spa, and a golf course. Prior to opening under the Park Hyatt name, it was part of the Toronto-based Four Seasons chain of luxury hotels and resorts.

== History ==
Completed in 1997, the Park Hyatt Aviara was designed in Spanish Colonial architecture and set on a plateau overlooking Batiquitos Lagoon and Wildlife Preserve. The resort was constructed along with an 18-hole Arnold Palmer-designed golf course and a 15,000-square-foot (1,400 m^{2}) spa, which was rated a top resort spa by Zagat in 2001 and Condé Nast Traveler in 2002.

== Amenities ==
=== Aviara Golf Club ===
The Aviara Golf Club, designed by Arnold Palmer, was honored with Golf Magazine's 2004 Gold Medal Resorts Award and ranked on Golf Digest's Top 75 Golf Resorts. It is considered one of Palmer's best golf courses. The JTBC Classic (formerly Kia Classic) for the LPGA Tour was held at the course.

=== Restaurants ===
The Park Hyatt Aviara Resort has three full-service restaurants on site. These are Ember & Rye, a Richard Blais steakhouse; Ponto Lago, a Baja-inspired restaurant, serving breakfast and dinner; Pacific Point, a Japanese inspired sushi and shareable plates cocktail bar in the lobby; and Waters’ Edge, a poolside restaurant serving tacos, bowls, sandwiches, and smoothies.
