= Aviara, Carlsbad, California =

Neighborhood in Carlsbad, California, US

Aviara is a resort neighborhood in the southern part of Carlsbad, located in San Diego County, California, United States. The community is approximately 30 minutes from downtown San Diego. In 1989, the community was developed and later incorporated into the city of Carlsbad. As of 2025, it had a total population of 8,422.

The community is set in the hills of southern Carlsbad, overlooking the Pacific Ocean and Batiquitos Lagoon. Aviara is just north of the city of Encinitas and west of the neighborhood of La Costa, also located in Carlsbad. The community is mostly residential except for the Park Hyatt Resort Aviara, the Four Seasons Residence Club, and Aviara Golf and Country Club. Many properties have views of the ocean, Batiquitos Lagoon, and Aviara golf course. The community is noted for its lush landscaping, gated communities, and abundance of jacaranda trees that frame many of the streets.

During 2008, Aviara was the only community in San Diego County not affected by the housing crisis.

To preserve quality of life, the community council has numerous stringent ordinances, including laws regarding architectural styles, permanent basketball hoops and courts, satellite dishes and exterior paint colors. It is a violation to leave trashcans on the street or in public view. With the exception of one community, Mirabella, multi-family housing is not permitted.

Well-known residents of the area include members of the Pulitzer family.

== Demographics ==
- Population: 8,422
- Area: 1.7 sq mi (4.4 km^{2}).
- Median Age: 42.8 years
- Total Housing Units: 2,025
- Zip Code: 92011

== Geography ==
Aviara is located at 33°6′15″N 117°17′45″W. According to the United States Census Bureau, the district has a total area of 1.6 square miles (4.1 km^{2}).

== Education ==
Younger children attend Aviara Oaks Elementary and Middle Schools while Carlsbad High School serves the older students. Sage Creek High School is the second high school in Carlsbad Unified School District that opened its doors for 2013-2014 school year. Private schools including Pacific Ridge School, Horizon Prep, St. Patrick's School, and Army & Navy Academy are located close by.

== Attraction ==
The Aviara Golf Club, featuring a coastal layout with a par of 72, 18 holes over 7,007 yards sculpted around the rolling hillsides.

== In popular culture ==
The Real Housewives of Miami star and former Dancing With the Stars contestant, Joanna Krupa, married her longtime love, Romain Zago, at the Park Hyatt Aviara Resort for a reported $1 million wedding. The wedding was featured on Bravo's show.
