= Bill Bryant (golf executive) =

American golf executive

George William Bryant (July 24, 1914 – April 17, 1983) was an American golf executive. He was the founder of the Junior Golf Association of Southern California and Industry Hills Golf Club.

== Career ==
Bryant worked as a golf executive in Southern California for more than 50 years. He started as a teenager when him and his father operated the Westward Ho golf course located in Palms, California. He later worked at Rio Hondo in Downey, California before leasing Brentwood golf course and opening it up for public play. His father died in 1947 and he took over the operation of Fox Hills.

Bryant was one of the founders of the Junior Golf Association of Southern California. He started the organization in 1948 in the club house of the California Country Club (now the property of California Country Club Estates).

Bryant was the founder of Industry Hills Golf Club, two 18-hole courses located in the City of Industry. The club was completed in 1980 and ranked in the top 25 public courses in the United States. The course also hosted LPGA tournaments as well as the California State Open and the 2011 Kia Classic.

Bryant was given the Golden State Award in 1980 for his service to golf in California.

== Personal life ==
Bryant died of cancer in April 1983.
