= Marina Peninsula, Los Angeles =

Neighborhood in Los Angeles, California, United States

Coordinates: 33.9796°N 118.4657°W

Marina Peninsula is a neighborhood in western Los Angeles, California. It is often considered a subsection of the adjacent neighborhood of Venice. Because of its name it is sometimes erroneously thought to be part of the adjacent community of Marina del Rey, California, but it was annexed to Los Angeles along with the rest of Venice in 1925.

Marina Peninsula lies directly west of Marina del Rey and west of the main Venice Canal, south and southeast of Venice Beach, and north of Ballona Creek. Its northern border is marked by Washington Boulevard. It houses about 3,000 mostly affluent residents.

Neighborhood organizations include the Marina Peninsula Community Council (an elected advisory board) and the Marina Peninsula Property Owners Association. It is part of the Venice Neighborhood Council.

All of the street names are alphabetical and nautical, starting with Anchorage Street and ending with Yawl Street. The Silver Strand is a subsection of Marina Peninsula.

== See also ==
- Ballona Lagoon
