= Ballona Lagoon =

Tidal wetland in Southern California, US

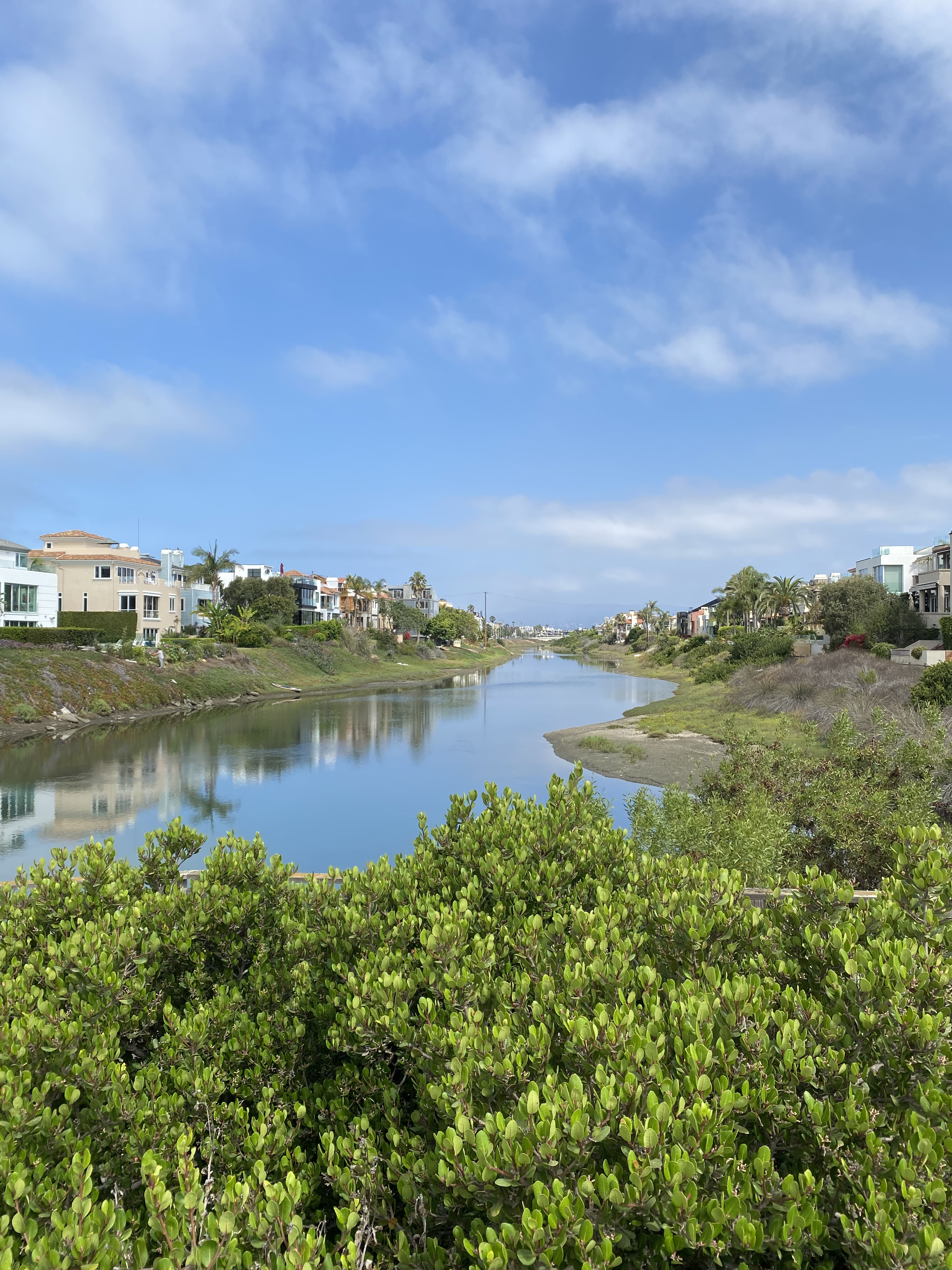
- Ballona Lagoon

- Location in Los Angeles
- Coordinates: 33.9718°N 118.4589°W
- Type: Tidal marsh
- Primary inflows: Marina Del Rey
- Primary outflows: Grand Canal

The Ballona Lagoon is a soft-bottomed channel and 16-acre (65,000 m^{2}) tidal marsh in the Marina Peninsula neighborhood of Los Angeles that feeds the Venice Canals with water from the Pacific Ocean via a tide gate.

== Geography ==
Ballona Lagoon “runs for about a mile, parallel to Via Marina in Marina Del Rey.” The primary wetland is bounded by Pacific Avenue, Via Dolce, Hurricane Street, and Yawl Street. At Hurricane the channel makes a sharp turn and becomes the Grand Canal of the Venice Canals. When it reaches Venice Boulevard the water remains in the North Venice Canals, and is flushed twice a week by the City of Los Angeles by opening and closing the gates at Washington Blvd and gates at Marina Del Rey Channel.

Part of the historic Ballona Valley ecosystem/watershed, the bodies of water now called Ballona Lagoon and Del Rey Lagoon are separated sisters, kept apart since the 1960s by the construction of the Marina Del Rey boat channel. Prior to the dredging of the sailboat harbor, “this acreage was for centuries a salt marsh.”

As described in a 1981 legal filing:

The Lagoon in its present configuration is a narrow elongated area covered by very shallow water and is separated from the ocean by a strand or bar of beach sand. Its entire length lies within 1,000 yards (910 m) of the ocean. It connects to the Venice Canals to the northwest and to the ocean channel entrance to Marina Del Rey on the southeast. Historically, the name Ballona Lagoon referred to a much larger area than that covered by the property here involved and was part of what was once Rancho Ballona. That additional area is now dry land as a result of filling and development and natural conditions.”

The tide gates replace as much as 95 percent of the lagoon's water daily.

== Bridge ==
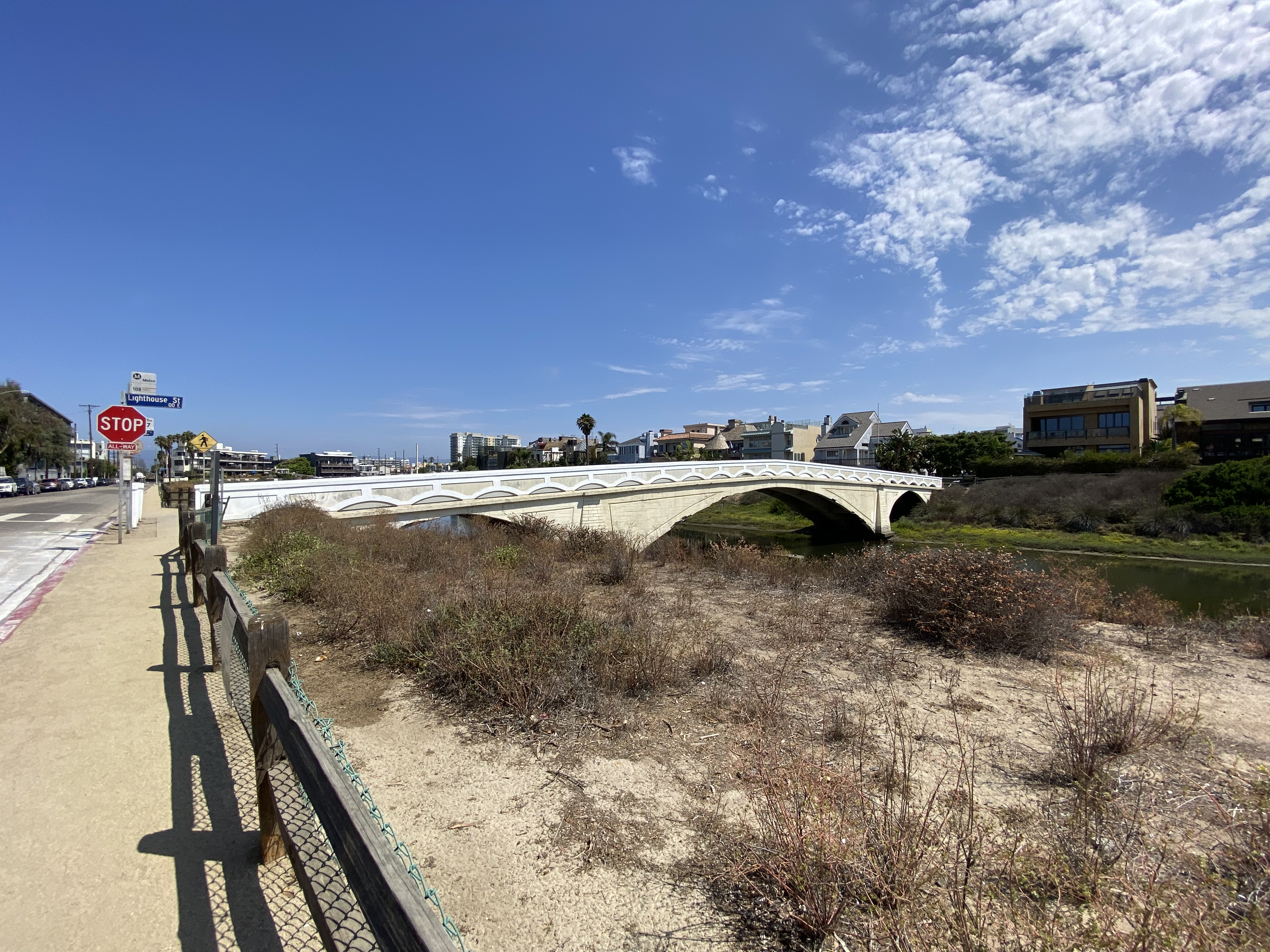
Lighthouse Street Bridge

The Lighthouse Street Bridge crossing the lagoon is a closed-spandrel bridge limited to pedestrian and bicycle traffic only. The bridge, sometimes called the Ballona Lagoon Bridge, was built by Abbot Kinney as part of his Venice of California development. The city of Los Angeles has recommended applying for Historic-Cultural Monument status for the bridge.

The Silver Strand development that fronts the lagoon “got its name and was subdivided in 1906 by Kinney, who built the Venice canals, which feed into the Ballona Lagoon. But it remained a subdivision on paper, and development became even less of a priority when oil was discovered in the area in 1930. For nearly 40 years, the Strand was a forest of oil pumps and wells.”

There are no past or present lighthouses in the vicinity of Lighthouse Street; the street names in this neighborhood are nautical terms in alphabetical order from Anchorage to Yawl.

== Restoration ==
The lagoon was restored incrementally beginning in 1988, with major work 1996–1997 after the city purchased “Lot R” (which comprised two-thirds of the lagoon) from a private owner. Improvements included viewing platforms, fencing, signage, native California plants authentic to the pre-development ecology of the area, dredging six feet (1.8 m) down at the tidal inlet to create fish spawning habitat, and building an island for nesting birds. Silt, litter and remnants of 50-year-old oil drilling equipment were removed. Further refurbishment took place in 2011, when the city added dog fencing, stabilized the banks of the waterway, and reseeded the rare wildflower called Orcutt's yellow pincushion.

At the time of a 1987 attempt to redevelop the Lagoon area, including potentially removing the Lighthouse Street Bridge, “Much of the ensuing debate revolved around the question of whether the lagoon is a beautiful, rare habitat for wildlife or a stinking mud hole.” A local marine biology professor spoke in defense of the mud, as it plays host to the “worms, clams and snails that live in the lagoon” which in turn feed the “avocets, curlews and sandpipers.”

One homeowner advocating for more development commented, “It is very charming at high tide but at low tide it smells.”

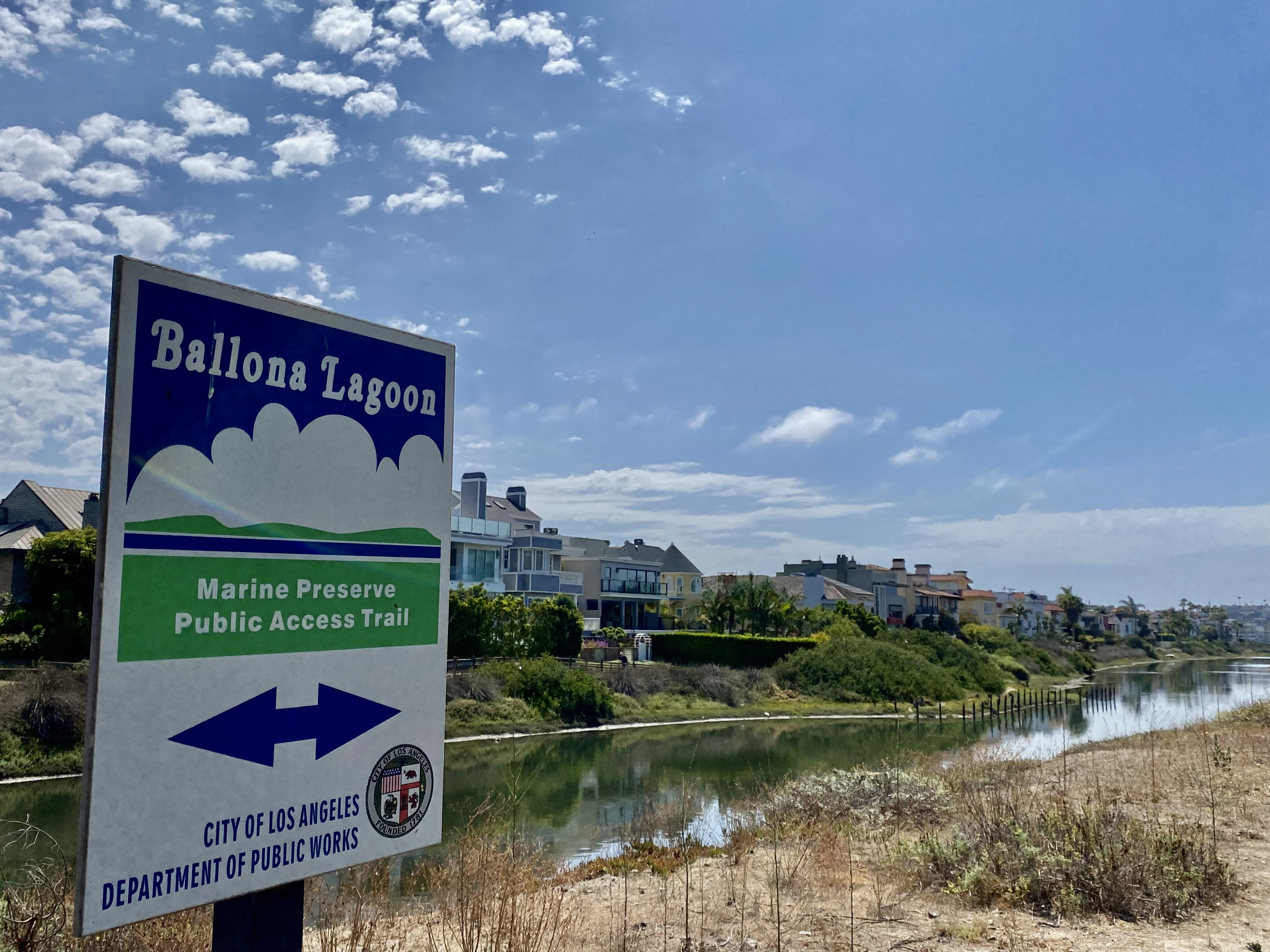
Public access trail

The restoration has been described as “wildly successful, providing rich native habitat and regulated access for people, where degraded land once dominated.”

== Ecology ==
Common native plants of the Lagoon include coastal buckwheat, beach-sand verbena, pickleweed, big saltbush, California brittlebush, and lemonade berry. Common wildlife includes snowy egrets, great blue herons, cormorants, kingfishers, mergansers, coots, fiddler crabs, hermit crabs, California mussels, three colors of sea anemones, chitons, limpets, volcano barnacles, innkeeper worms, and sea hares. A fenced-off lot on the adjacent beach is a protected nesting site for the California least tern, which also make appearances in the lagoon. Fish present in the lagoon include goby, halibut and topsmelt silverside.

== Recreation ==
The Lagoon is accessible via the 1.8-mile (2.9 km) Ballona Lagoon Marine Preserve Trail, said to be "fragrant with coastal sage and jasmine, and if you run south, you can turn right at the base of the lagoon and run out onto the jetty that is the northern bank of the Marina del Rey channel."

== See also ==
- Del Rey Lagoon
- Marina Del Rey
- Lagoons of California
