= Industry Hills Golf Club =

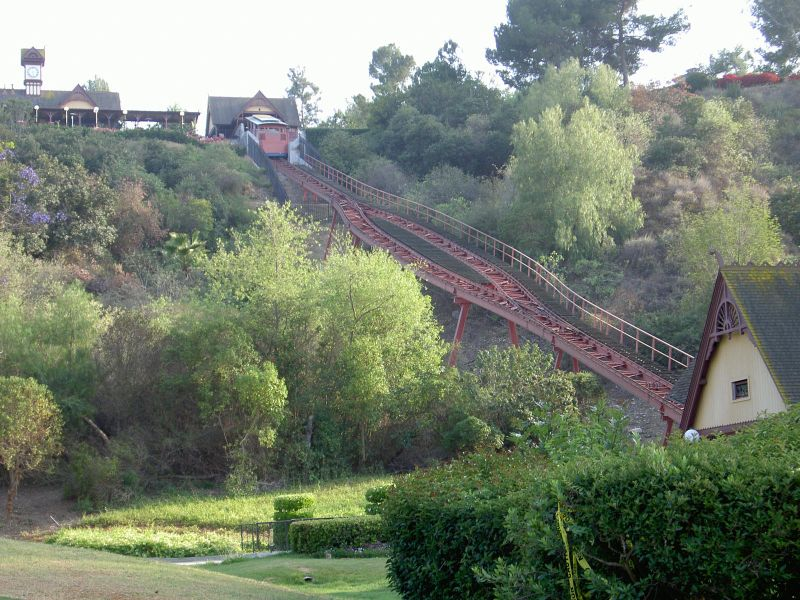
- A funicular railway that transported golfers and their carts between holes at the resort's golf courses.

- Location in the United States Location in California
- 34.020493°N 117.9271076°W

Club information
- Location: 1 Industry Hills Pkwy; City of Industry, California, U.S.
- Established: 1979
- Type: Public
- Tota holes: 36
- Tournaments: LPGA Kia Classic 2011
- Website: Official website

Eisenhower
- Designed by: William Francis Bell
- Par: 72
- Length: 7,211 yards (6,594 m)
- Course rating: 74.9
- Slope rating: 141

Zaharias
- Designed by: William Francis Bell
- Par: 71
- Length: 6,826 yards (6,242 m)
- Course rating: 73.6
- Slope rating: 135

Industry Hills Golf Club at Pacific Palms (commonly referred to as Industry Hills), is a golf club located in the City of Industry, California. It is made up of two 18-hole courses known as The Ike and The Babe. It is the location of PGA, LPGA, and Champions Tour qualifiers and hosted the 2011 Kia Classic.

== History ==
Industry Hills was founded by Bill Bryant and designed by William P. Bell in 1979 and 1980. and built on top of a former landfill site. It is two 18-hole courses, one named after President Dwight D. Eisenhower (The Ike) and the other after Babe Zaharias (the Babe). The Eisenhower course opened in November 1979, and when built had eight lakes and 108 sand traps. The Zaharias course opened the following year with 52 sand traps. It is a shorter but narrower course than Eisenhower.

The course was built with a trolley-like funicular to transport golfers and carts up a steep hill at the finish of the 36th hole. The trolley runs to a snack bar that at one time held the rail car that carried the body of Winston Churchill at his funeral (the car was returned to Britain in 2007). The club also housed a golf library which was the only public golf library in the west, and only one of two in the United States.

The California Open moved to Industry Hills in 1980. The club also hosted the Olympia Gold Classic in both 1981 and 1982. The tournament stopped playing at the club after players complained about the length, the hills, and the rough.

The club was purchased by John Semcken and Ed Roski Jr. of Majestic Realty Co. in 2000. After the purchase, they undertook at $25 million renovation.

In 2011, the Kia Classic was moved to Industry Hills due to renovations taking place at La Costa Resort and Spa. The tournament used a combination of holes from both the Eisenhower and Zaharias courses, eliminating the long hills on some holes.

Industry Hills has also held the Monday qualifier for the Genesis Open.

== Movies and television ==
Industry Hills has been used as a filming location for television and movies due to its close proximity to Hollywood.

- Caddyshack - Used for fill in shots for the 1980 American comedy film.
- Falling Down - Michael Douglas is seen walking through a fairway at Industry Hills (Ike 10) when two elderly golfers begin yelling at him. One golfer hits a ball at Douglas who then pulls out a shotgun. The golfer has a heart attack on the golf course and Douglas continues to pass through.
- Scarecrow and Mrs King episode Rumors of My Death - Funicular railway cars were used for scenes in which the bad guys met to discuss their plans and examine the International Security Passport for sale.

== See also ==
- Industry Hills Aquatic Club
