= Oxford Basin =

Body of water in California, US

- Oxford Lagoon; Marina Sanctuary
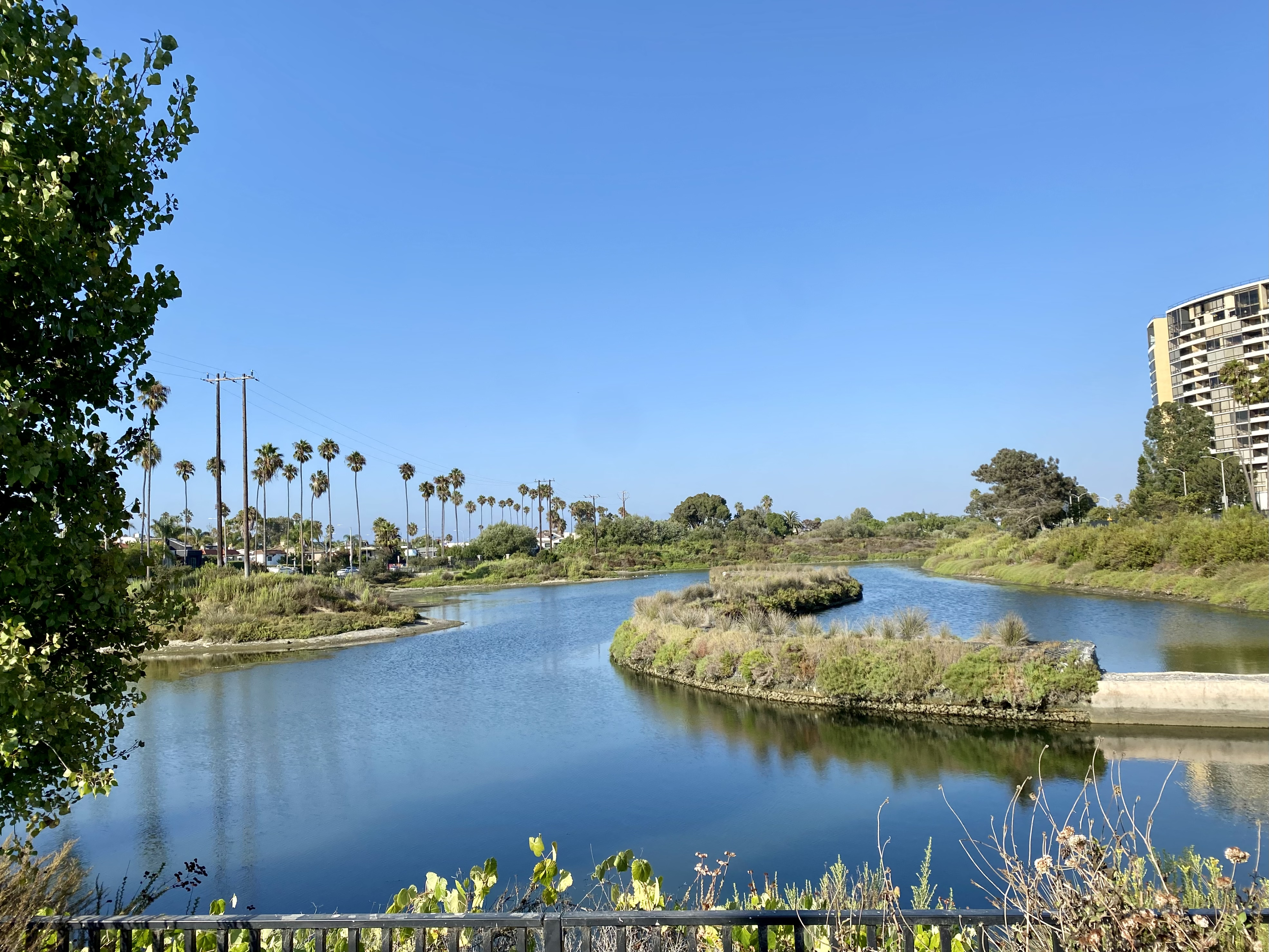
- Oxford Basin

- Location within the Los Angeles metropolitan area Location within California
- Location: Marina del Rey, California, U.S.
- Coordinates: 33°59′06″N 118°27′22″W
- Type: Wetland
- Part of: Ballona Wetlands
- Primary inflows: Storm drains, tidal inflows, groundwater
- Primary outflows: Basin E, Marina Del Rey
- Basin countries: United States
- Managing agency: Los Angeles County Department of Public Works
- Built: 1959
- Surface area: 10.7 acres (4.3 ha)
- Website: Oxford Retention Basin

Oxford Basin (also known as Oxford Lagoon or Marina Sanctuary) is a 10.7-acre (43,000 m^{2}) constructed wetland and wildlife conservation area in the northwest corner of Marina del Rey, California, located between Washington Boulevard and Admiralty Way.

The basin is a remnant of the historic Ballona Valley ecosystem and one of the last remaining intertidal mud flat habitats in Los Angeles County.

Oxford Basin collects urban runoff from a 600-acre (2.4 km^{2}) watershed and remediates it in part through the use of bioswales, low-flow storm drain diversions, native landscaping and a circulation berm. Other inputs to the lagoon are groundwater and tidal inflows from Marina del Rey Harbor.

Oxford Basin is ringed by a 0.7-mile (1.1 km) nature walk loop that runs parallel to the Coastal Bike Trail on the Oxford Avenue side. Observation decks offer opportunities for wildlife viewing; the lagoon is host to between 50 and 100 species of birds. The Basin is "currently favored" for wading bird roosting and nesting because it "does not have significant human-bird conflicts."

== Ecology ==
Oxford Basin contains several different types of habitat, including open water, mudflats, salt marsh, and upland vegetation. Mudflat exposure changes with the tides, and some of the higher areas create an ideal environment for native Wild Heliotrope (Heliotropium curassavicum) and Common Woody Pickleweed (Salicornia virginica).

Oxford Basin is home to a diverse ecological landscape, comprising abundant flora and fauna. For example, birds are an important part of the basin’s ecosystem. Oxford Basin provides feeding habitat for locally nesting herons and egrets, while small groups of waterfowl use the lagoon during the winter. Currently, Marina del Rey now supports a combined total of more than 100 breeding pairs of Double-crested Cormorants (Nannopterum auritum), Black-crowned Night-Herons (Nycticorax nycticorax), Great Blue Herons (Ardea herodias), Great Egrets (Ardea alba), and Snowy Egrets (Egretta thula), many of which feed at Oxford Basin.

Aquatic invertebrates also occur in the mudflats. The Oxford Basin Invertebrate Study that took place between September 18, 2009, and May 24, 2010, found that some of the most common aquatic invertebrates included the native California mud snail (Cerithideopsis californica) and Gammarid Amphipods, which are a primary food source and an “important link in healthy lagunal ecosystems,” according to the study. Other native species recorded in the study included the brine fly (Ephydra niveiceps), sinuous bee fly (Hemipenthes sinuosa), jumping spider (Habronattus pyrrithrix), and margined spur-throated grasshopper (Melanoplus marginatus).

Oxford Basin’s ecology is also shaped by its urban Los Angeles location. The basin receives stormwater runoff from surrounding neighborhoods and connects to Marina del Rey Harbor through a tide gate. Consequently, the Basin’s water is roughly half as saline as seawater. Because the basin must continue to provide flood control, conservation efforts have focused on improving wildlife habitat while maintaining its flood-control function.

== Renewal ==
The Oxford Basin enhancement project, under the combined auspices of the Los Angeles County Department of Public Works, Los Angeles County Flood Control District and Los Angeles County Department of Beaches & Harbors, was completed in 2016.

Improvements included "flooding and runoff improvements…new fencing and signage, observation areas, lighting and a walking path." Some 3,000 cubic yards of polluted sediment was removed from the site. New floodgates were installed in improve water circulation.

Some 650 existing plants and trees were removed, including non-native eucalyptus used seasonally by nesting birds and resting monarch butterflies. The old vegetation was replaced with 730 native trees and 45,000 native plants, including 200 new milkweed plants (the only food plant consumed by the monarch butterfly caterpillar).

The California Native Plant Society assisted in the establishment of site-appropriate plant communities, including coastal sage scrub, coastal salt marsh and willow scrub. "Native vegetation increased from 4.3 acres (17,000 m^{2}) to 5.28 acres (21,400 m^{2}), a 23 percent gain."

The project cost $14.7 million and the improvements have allowed "the utilitarian basin to function more like a public park."

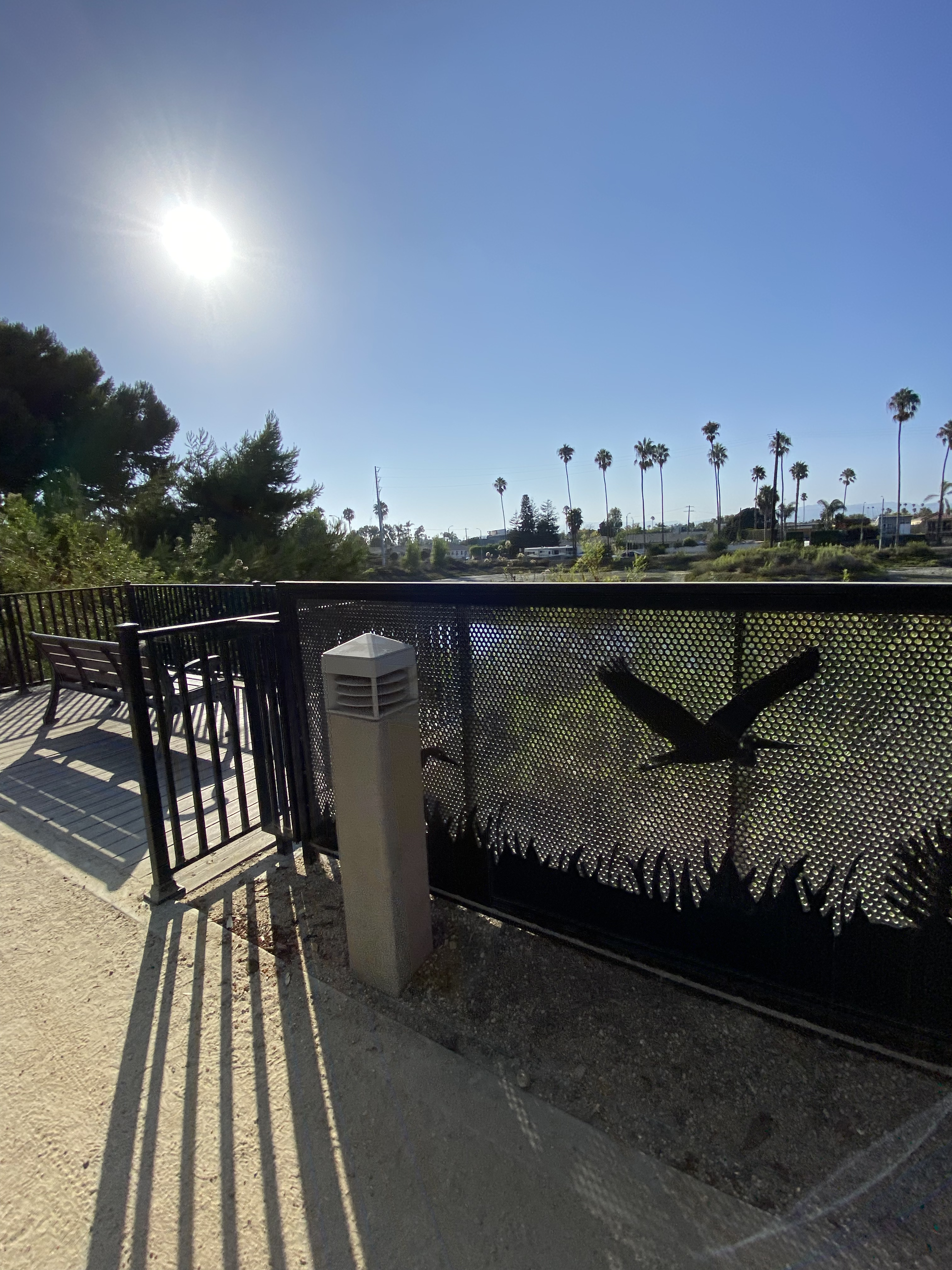
Wildlife viewing station

== History ==
The location where the basin now sits was originally part of the Ballona Wetlands and after settlement had a stint as farmland. Oxford Basin as we know it today was built in 1959 during the creation of the Marina Del Rey small-boat harbor "on the site of an old municipal dump, to prevent flooding in nearby communities." ("Several of the streets and properties in the area surrounding Oxford Basin are near or below the high-tide level in the marina.")

In 1963 it was named the Marina Del Rey County Bird Conservation Area thanks in part to advocacy by the Audubon Society. It was hoped that the refuge would attract species like the wood ibis, elegant tern, least tern and tree duck, and be "ideal for the birds due to its tidal action. The rhythm of the tides tells the birds when to eat and otherwise adjust their lives." Over the years it developed into "a little habitat with an odd assortment of birds and other animals and non-native plants and trees." A population of abandoned livestock (primarily rabbits, chickens and domestic ducks) lived at so-called "Duck Pond" until the 1980s; "visitors could see a guinea hen sunning itself outside a rabbit warren, a black swan staying cool in the shade and three ducks padding around a watering hole." These introduced species were removed to other county parks in 1989 due to complains about noise and odor.

Prior to the restoration some considered the basin a "muddy puddle" or a "foul-smelling eyesore." A 2010 survey of invertebrates at the muddy puddle found "85 terrestrial and marine taxa (two mollusks, eight spiders, 67 insects, and eight other arthropods)."

== Access ==
Limited street parking is available on Washington Blvd. and at nearby park and beach lots.

Transit access includes bus stops serviced by Culver CityBus Line 1 and Big Blue Bus Line 18, as well as Playa Vista's summer beach shuttle service. Marina Del Rey also offers a seasonal WaterBus ferry service that stops nearby.

L.A. County's coastal bike trail (Marvin Braude Bike Trail) passes by the basin, just west of Yvonne B. Burke Park.

== See also ==
- Ballona Lagoon
- Del Rey Lagoon Park
- Marvin Braude Bike Trail
