= Neary Lagoon =

Lagoon in Santa Cruz, California

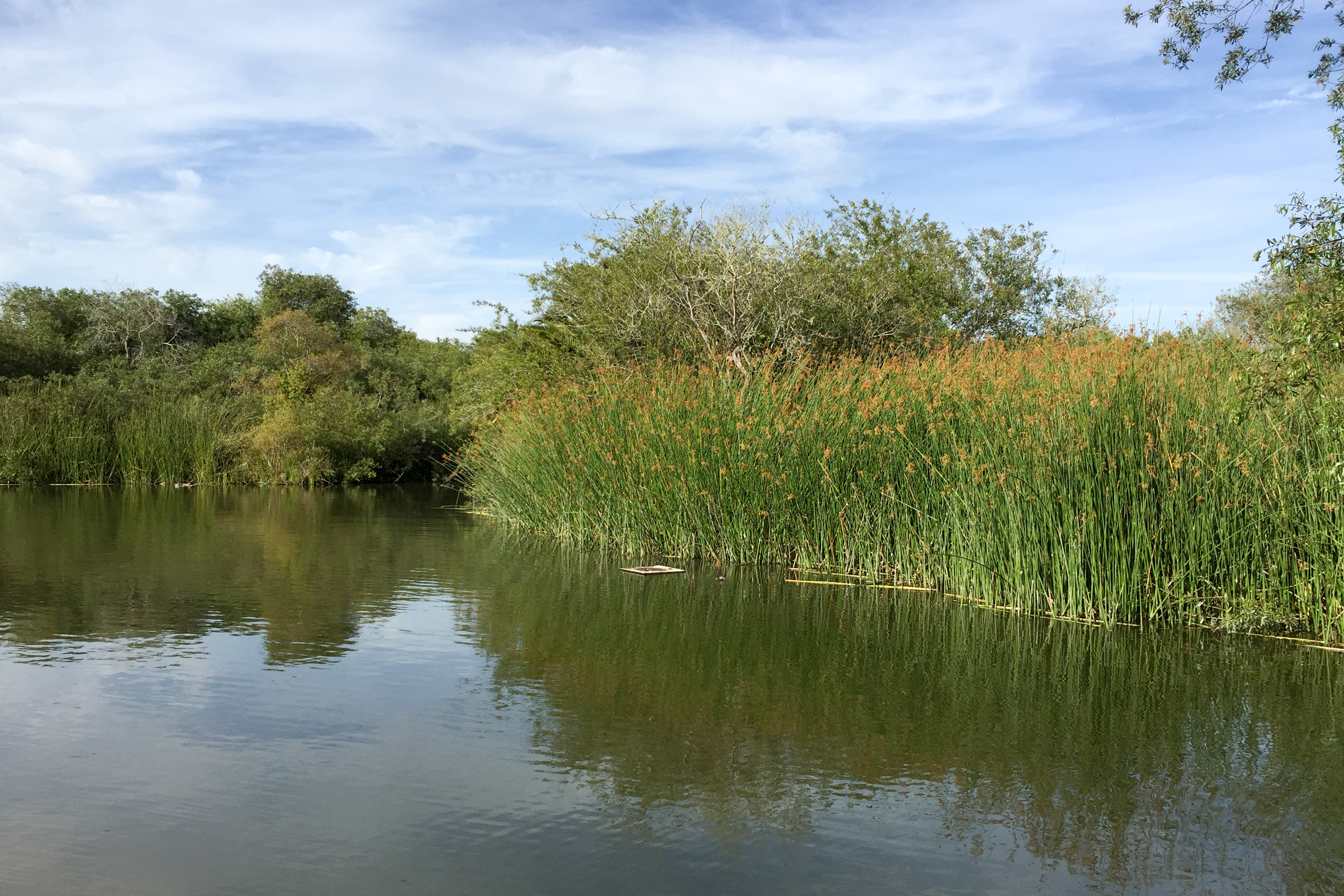
- Tall grass surrounds the central island of Neary Lagoon

- Location in California
- Location: Santa Cruz, California
- Coordinates: 36°57′48″N 122°01′55″W
- Type: Lagoon
- Primary inflows: Laurel Creek
- Primary outflows: Monterey Bay
- Catchment area: 850 acres (340 ha)
- Islands: 6

Neary Lagoon is a small lagoon located in the Lower Westside neighborhood of Santa Cruz, California. The lagoon is protected within Neary Lagoon Park, which serves as both a municipal park and wildlife refuge for migratory birds. The Santa Cruz Water Treatment Plant abuts the southwestern edge of the lagoon.

== Hydrology ==
The 850 acre (344 hectare) Laurel Creek watershed feeds into the lagoon, the discharge of which varies seasonally. Water levels in the lagoon vary seasonally. Water from the lagoon then flows out through a channelized water gap before emptying into Monterey Bay at Cowell's Beach.

== Wildlife ==
Avian wildlife that inhabit or seasonally visit the lagoon include mallard, wood duck, pied billed grebe, belted kingfisher, Canada goose, great blue heron, red-tailed hawk, and a variety of coot species. The western pond turtle and a variety of small fish species also inhabit the lake.

== Park amenities ==
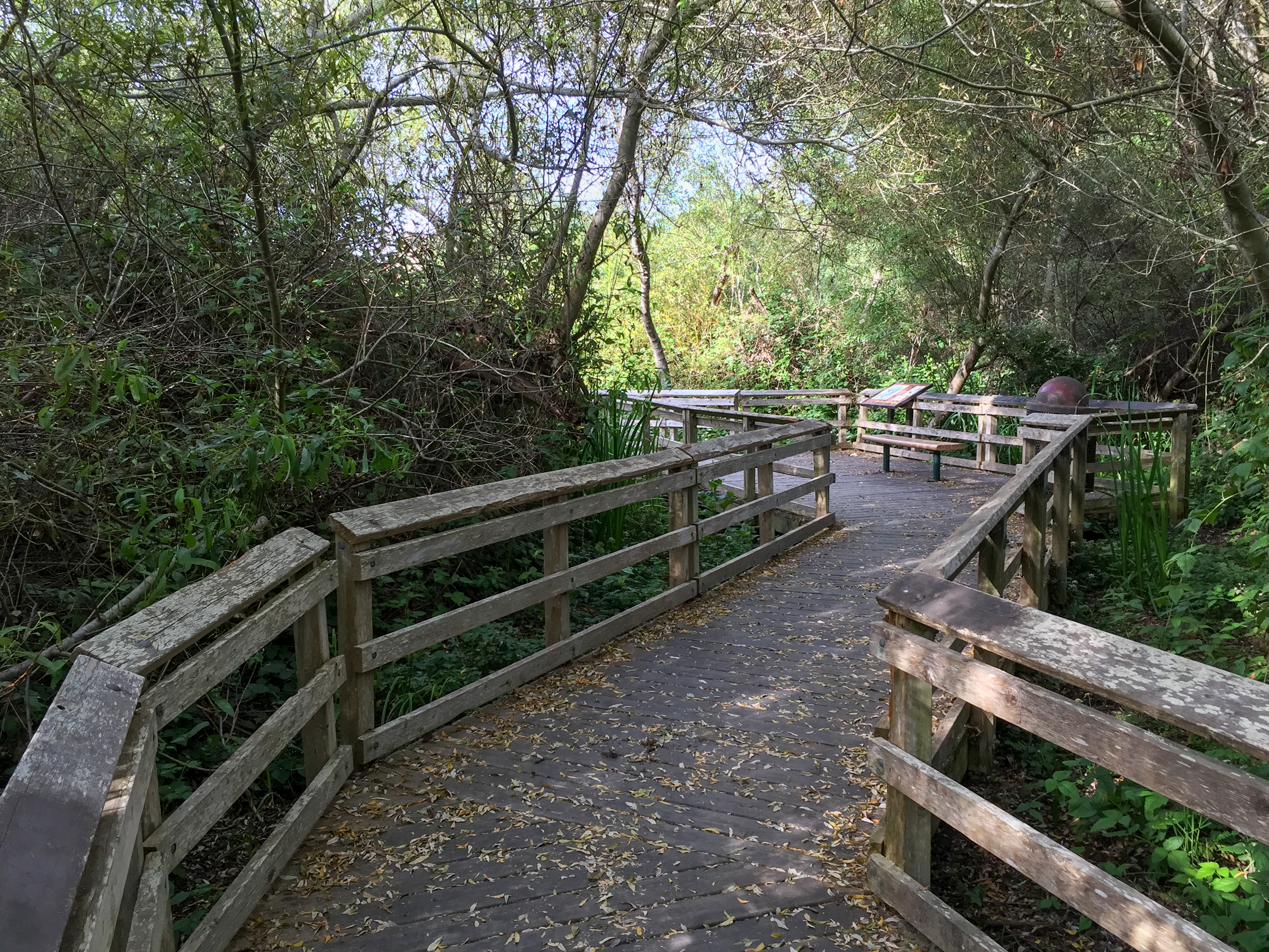
The Neary Lagoon Boardwalk

The park features approximately 1 mile (1.6 km) of wheelchair accessible gravel trails that encircle the lagoon, as well as a 1,076 ft (328 m) long floating boardwalk and pier that passes through the center of the lagoon. Informational signs and benches can be found along the trails and boardwalk. A single-stall public restroom can be found at the Bay Street entrance to the lagoon.

== Access ==
The lagoon can be accessed via three entrances: Bay Street at California Street, the southern end of Chestnut Street, or Blackburn Street at Shelter Lagoon Drive.

Due to the park's dual purpose of serving as a park and wildlife refuge, dogs are forbidden from entering the park.

== See also ==
- Lighthouse Field State Beach
- Santa Cruz Beach Boardwalk
