= Famosa Slough State Marine Conservation Area =

Marine protected area on the coast of San Diego, California

Famosa Slough State Marine Conservation Area (SMCA) is a marine protected area in San Diego on California’s south coast. It consists of a 25-acre wetland and a 12-acre natural channel connecting to the San Diego River estuary. It is flushed by salt water from the estuary as well as rainwater from the surrounding neighborhood. It is owned and maintained by the City of San Diego as a natural park.

The SMCA covers .03 square miles. It protects marine life by limiting the removal of marine wildlife from within its borders. The SMCA prohibits take of all living marine resources except for take pursuant to habitat restoration, maintenance dredging and operation and maintenance of artificial structures is allowed inside the conservation area per any required federal, state and local permits, or as otherwise authorized by the department.

== History ==
Famosa Slough SMCA is one of 36 new marine protected areas adopted by the California Fish and Game Commission in December, 2010 during the third phase of the Marine Life Protection Act Initiative. The MLPAI is a collaborative public process to create a statewide network of protected areas along California's coastline.

The south coast's new marine protected areas were designed by local divers, fishermen, conservationists and scientists who comprised the South Coast Regional Stakeholder Group. Their job was to design a network of protected areas that would preserve sensitive sea life and habitats while enhancing recreation, study and education opportunities.

The south coast marine protected areas went into effect in 2012.

== Geography and natural features ==
Famosa Slough SMCA is a marine protected area that protects estuarine waters in San Diego County on California's south coast.

Famosa Slough SMCA includes the waters below the mean high tide line within Famosa Slough estuary southward of the San Diego River channel, located at approximately:

1. 32°45.43′N 117°13.75′W.

== Habitat and wildlife ==
The Famosa Slough State Marine Reserve (SMR) was designed to protect a 37-acre urban wetland in San Diego estuary habitat and provide for outstanding educational and recreational opportunities. It is a significant feeding and resting site for ducks and shorebirds including a myriad of heron and tern populations using the Pacific Flyway. The site is supported by a volunteer organization called the Friends of Famosa Slough, which hosts nature walks, encourages scientific studies, and holds regular work parties to clean the slough and remove invasive plants.

== Recreation and nearby attractions ==
Recreational fishing is not allowed at the Famosa Slough State Marine Conservation Area.

== Scientific monitoring ==
As specified by the Marine Life Protection Act, select marine protected areas along California's south coast are being monitored by scientists to track their effectiveness and learn more about ocean health. Similar studies in marine protected areas located off of the Santa Barbara Channel Islands have already detected gradual improvements in fish size and number.
