= Del Rey Lagoon Park =

Municipal park in California, US

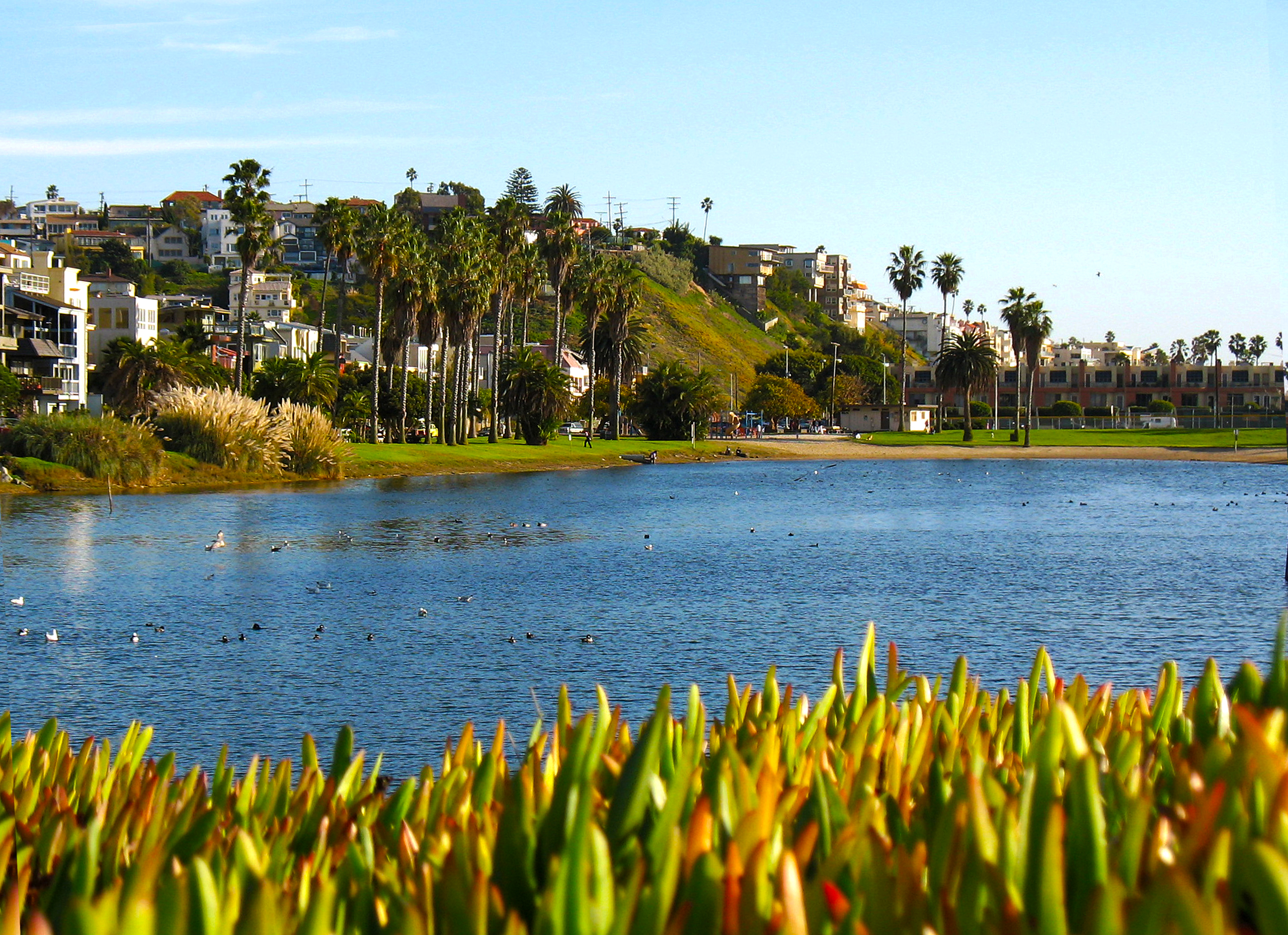
- The duck pond at Playa Del Rey
- Interactive map of Del Rey Lagoon Park
- Location: 6660 Esplanade Place, Playa Del Rey, 90293
- Coordinates: 33°57′36″N 118°27′00″W
- Parking: Paid lot
- Public transit: Metro 115

Del Rey Lagoon Park is a 14-acre (57,000 m^{2}) municipal park in the Playa Del Rey neighborhood of Los Angeles, United States, with a lagoon that is part of the greater Ballona Creek watershed.

The park features lighted baseball fields, lighted basketball courts and a children's playground. There is a dedicated parking lot just off Pacific Avenue.

Del Rey Lagoon (sometimes called "the duck pond") covers six acres (24,000 m^{2} and is 1,250 ft (380 m) long and approximately 350 ft (110 m) wide. The depth of the lagoon circa 1959 was four to six feet (1.2-1.8 m). The lagoon is a place where "wild ducks swim beside the domestic varieties that are cast-off Easter presents for city-dwellers' children." Among the wild waterfowl is a "large population of bufflehead ducks, great blue herons and coots."

== History ==
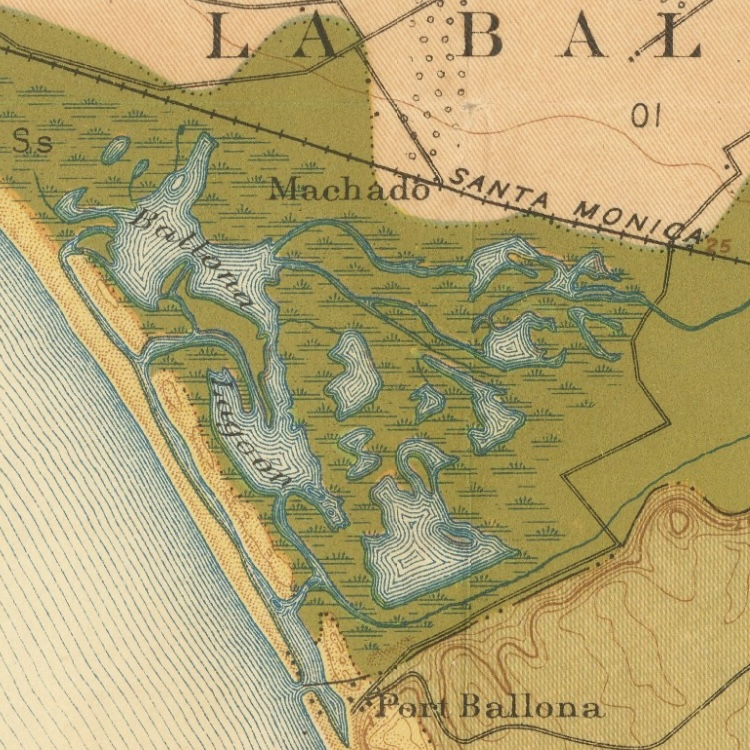
Circa 1903, Del Rey Lagoon was just one element within an integrated wetland

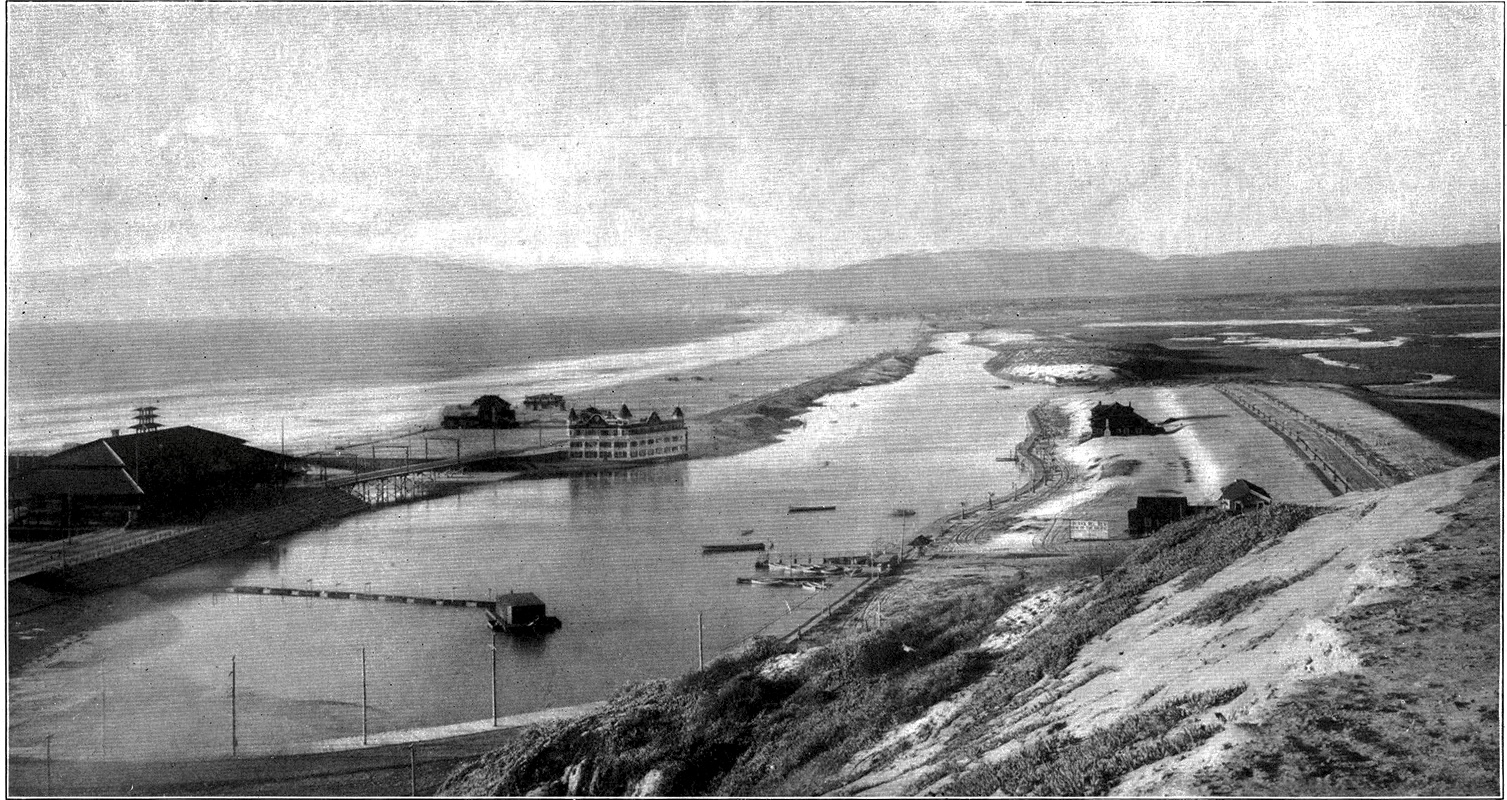
Ballona lagoons from Playa Del Rey dunes, photographed c. 1905

Del Rey and Ballona Lagoons were originally part of the same Ballona Creek estuary channel system.

The lagoon played host to crew races in the first decade of the 20th century. The lagoon played host to the Los Angeles Motordrome racetrack, "world's first board track built for race cars" that was located adjacent to the lagoon from 1910 to 1913.

Lagoon visible in background of Motordrome postcard

The lagoon had a tidal exit channel as recently as 1929, before the Venice Oil Field was discovered and the Ballona Creek delta was reworked, by the 1930s flood-control channelization as well as the 1960s creation of Marina Del Rey. In the early 1960s several undeveloped blocks south of the lagoon were acquired and the park was expanded with additional fields now home to a Little League Baseball facility and playground.

Circa the 1950s, a water-control gate refilled the lagoon at high tide. The lagoon had previously been a salt marsh "subject to tidal flow," but Del Rey "suffered as recreational lagoon because of the great change in water level." In 1979, a motorized gate was opened "monthly to flush out the now land-locked pond." Community members would remove grass and litter from the lagoon by hand to prevent a build-up of smelly algae.

Sailing classes were offered at the lagoon by the city parks department as recently as 1991. The lagoon had "a little wharf where the Los Angeles Recreation and Parks Department launches its canoeing classes." In 1959 "the oblong-shaped lagoon" was described as a "boating paradise," with "28 small boats of all sizes and kinds" available for public use, including canoes, sailboats, rowboats, kayaks, outriggers and paddlewheel boats. In 1973, the city offered "children's boating classes every Saturday morning at the lagoon, giving information on handling canoes and sabots. Boating is open to children only and there is no swimming allowed." The dock has since been removed and boating is no longer permitted on the lagoon.

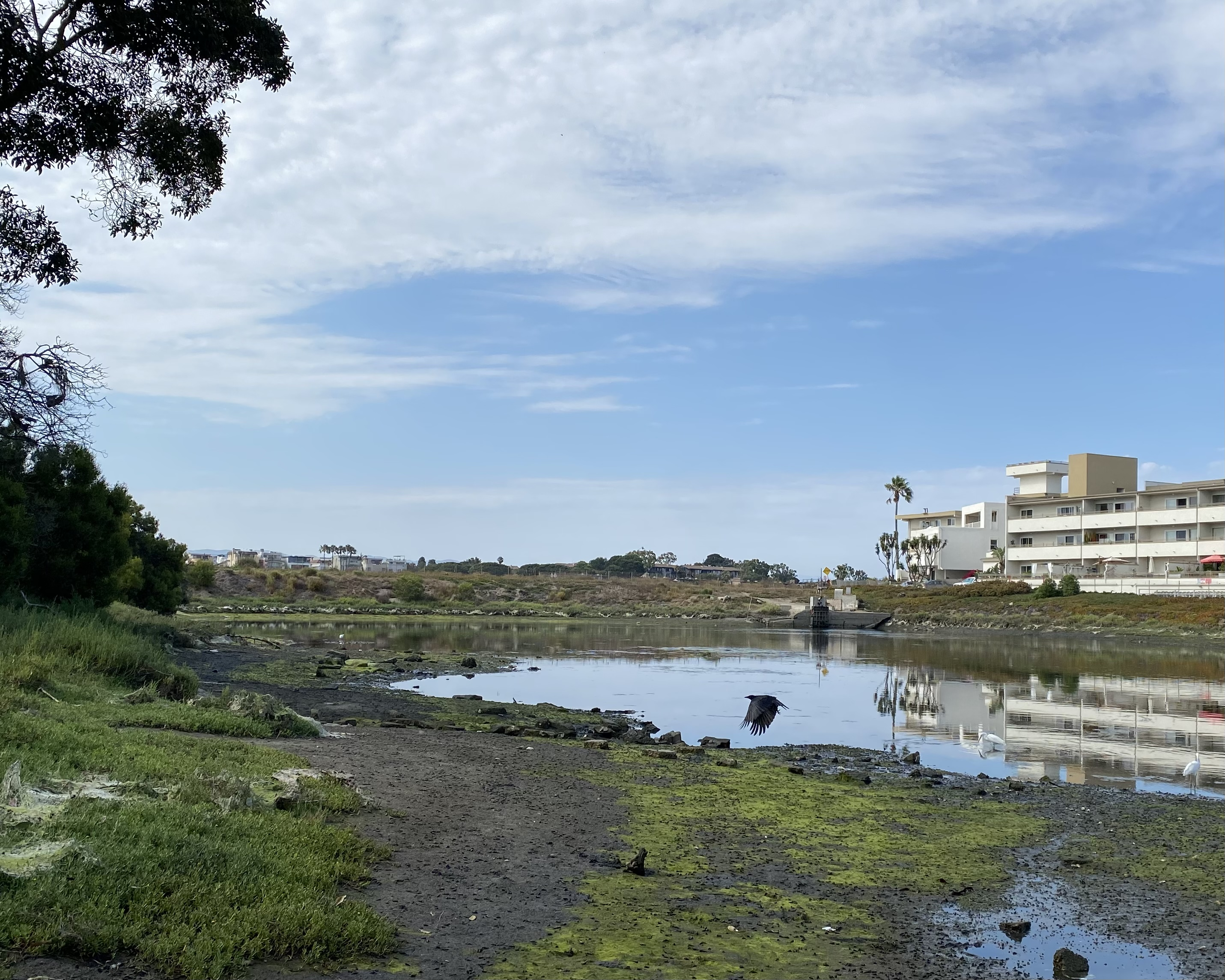
Del Rey Lagoon at low ebb, water gate visible on the embankment

== See also ==
- Ballona Lagoon
- Oxford Basin
