= Venice Canal Historic District =

Historic district in California, United States

- U.S. National Register of Historic Places
- U.S. Historic district
- Los Angeles Historic-Cultural Monument
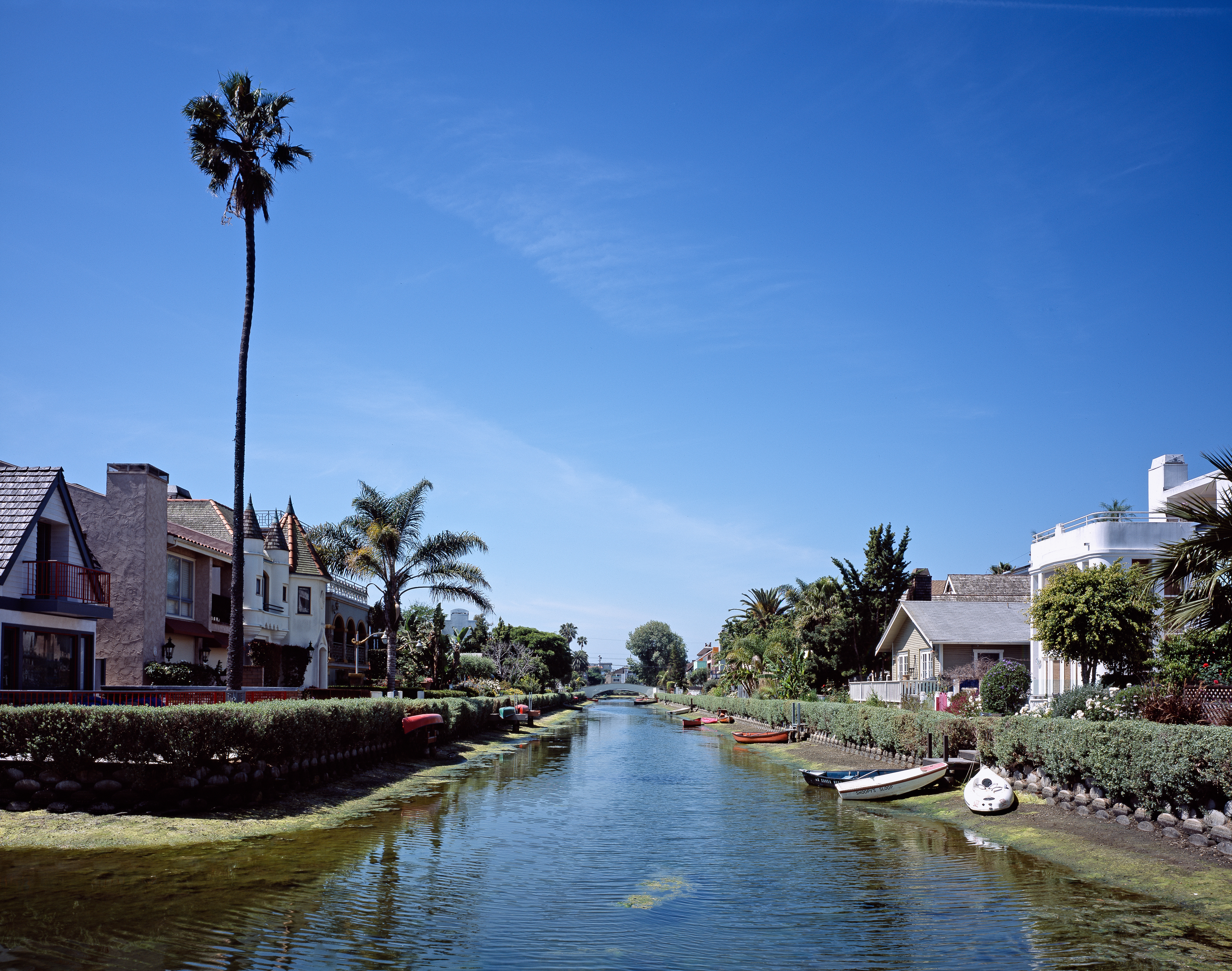
- Venice Canal Historic District

- Location within the Los Angeles metropolitan area Location within California Location within the United States
- Location: Los Angeles, California
- Coordinates: 33°59′1″N 118°27′55″W
- Built: 1905
- Architects: Moses Sherman, Eli Clark
- NRHP reference No.: 82002193
- LAHCM No.: 270

Significant dates
- Added to NRHP: August 30, 1982
- Designated LAHCM: July 15, 1983

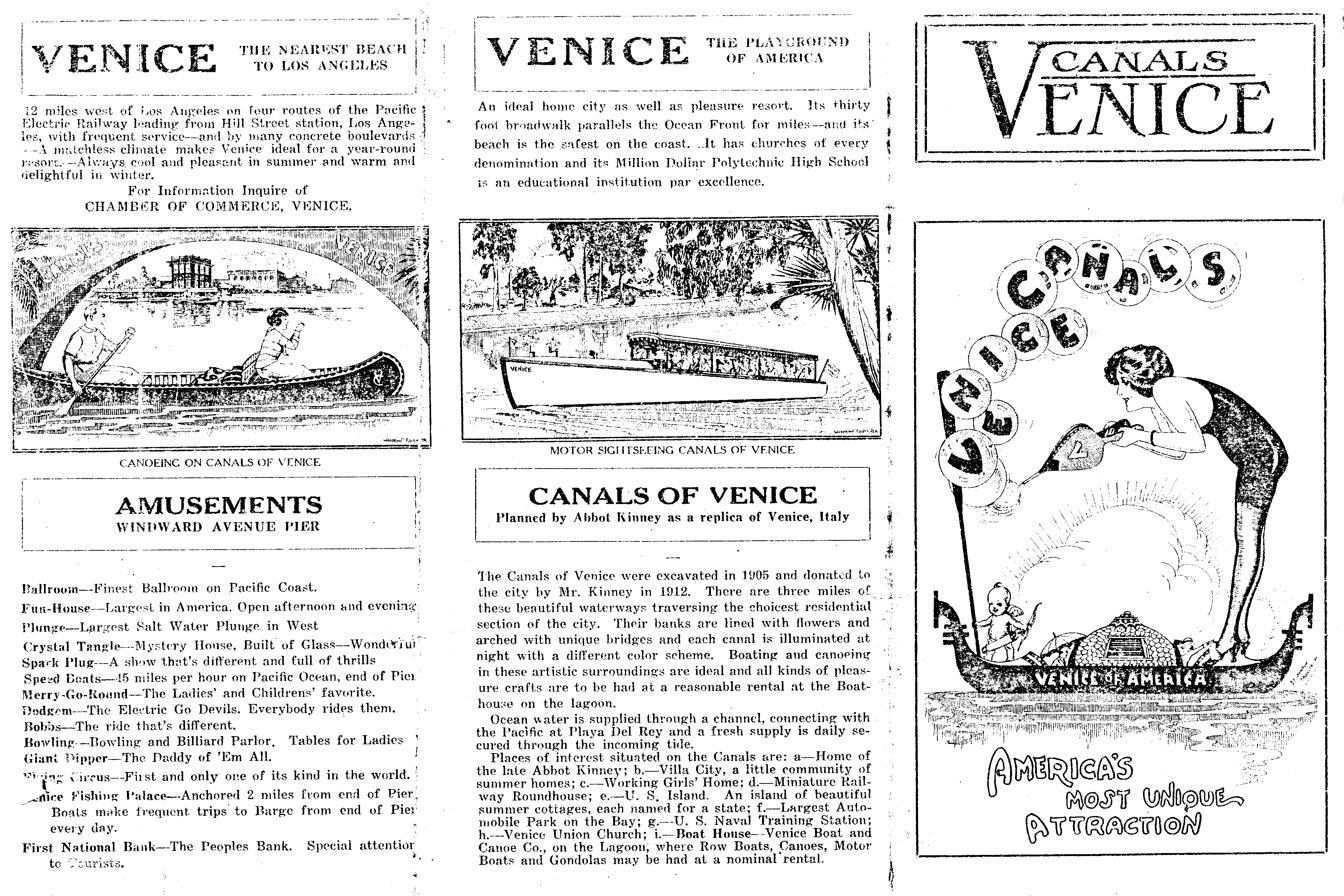
1920 flyer promoting canals as "America's most unique attraction"

The Venice Canal Historic District is embedded in Venice, a residential neighborhood of Los Angeles, California. The historic district is noteworthy for possessing man-made wetland canals, built in 1905 by developer Abbot Kinney as part of his Venice of America. Kinney sought to recreate the appearance and feel of Venice, Italy, in coastal Los Angeles County. The names of the canals were given by Abbot Kinney as follows: Aldebaran Canal, Altair Canal, Cabrillo Canal, Coral Canal, Grand Canal, Lion Canal and Venus Canal.

Another set of canals was built south of the Venice Canals, originally known as the New Amsterdam Canals by investors and architects, namely Howland, Sherman and Clark, land owners whom two canals were named after. These canals are roughly bounded by Eastern Court on the east, Court A on the south, Strongs Drive on the west, and Court E on the north. There are four east-west canals (Carroll Canal, Linnie Canal, Howland Canal, and Sherman Canal) and two north-south canals (Eastern Canal and Grand Canal). The lit canals with gondoliers and arched bridges drew widespread publicity and helped sell lots in the development.

By the 1920s, with cars quickly gaining popularity, the canals were viewed by many as outdated, and as a result a number of canals were filled in 1929 to make room for paved roads. By 1940 the remaining canals had fallen into disrepair, and the sidewalks were condemned by the city. The district remained in poor condition for more than 40 years; numerous proposals to renovate the canals failed due to lack of funding, environmental concerns, and disputes as to who should bear the financial responsibility. The canals were finally renovated in 1992; they were drained, and new sidewalks and walls were built. The canals re-opened in 1993, and have become a desirable and expensive residential section of the city.

The residential district surrounding the remaining canals was listed on the National Register of Historic Places in 1982. However, in recent years, there has been extensive renovation work on many of the old houses, and many large, modern houses have been built.

The water enters the canals through sea gates in the Marina Del Rey breakwater via the Ballona Lagoon, and again in Washington Boulevard. They open at low tide to drain most of the water, and at high tide they are closed, trapping the water for about three days, before being refreshed again.

== Former canals ==
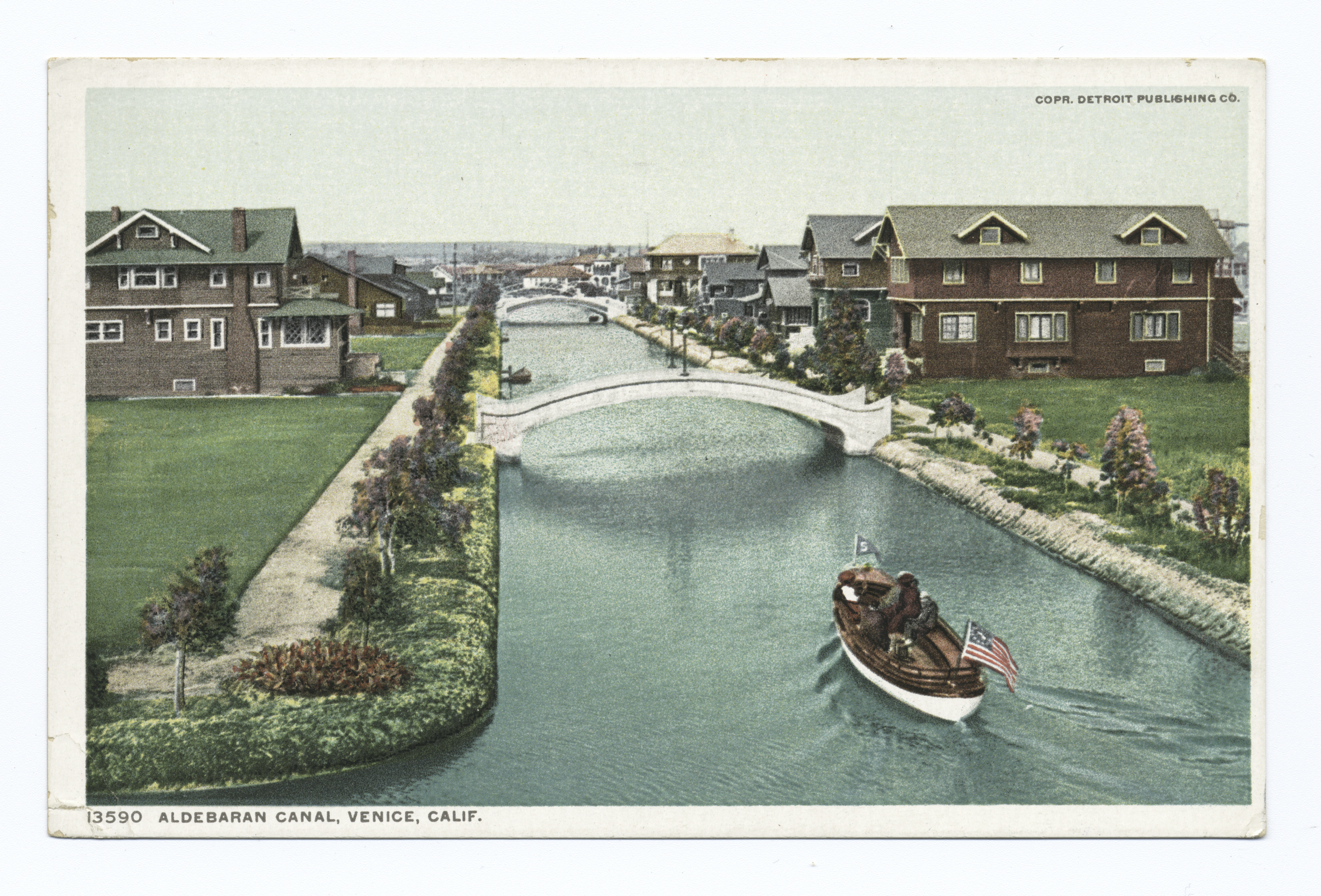
Aldebaran Canal, Venice, Calif.

Before 1929, the area covered by canals was approximately three to four times as large as today. The number of canals was reduced from thirteen to six. The canals were bounded by Abbot Kinney Blvd., Pacific Ave., Westminster Ave., and Venice Blvd. The seven canals were renamed as concrete roads by the City of Los Angeles as Main St. and Canal St. (formerly Coral Canal), Cabrillo Ave. (formerly Cabrillo Canal), San Juan Ave. (formerly Venus Canal), Windward Ave. (formerly Lion Canal), Altair St. (formerly Altair Canal), Market St. (formerly Aldebaren Canal) and Grand Boulevard (formerly Grand Canal)

The traffic circle at Pacific and Windward Avenues is located on top of what once was the Venice Lagoon.

== Canal improvement project ==
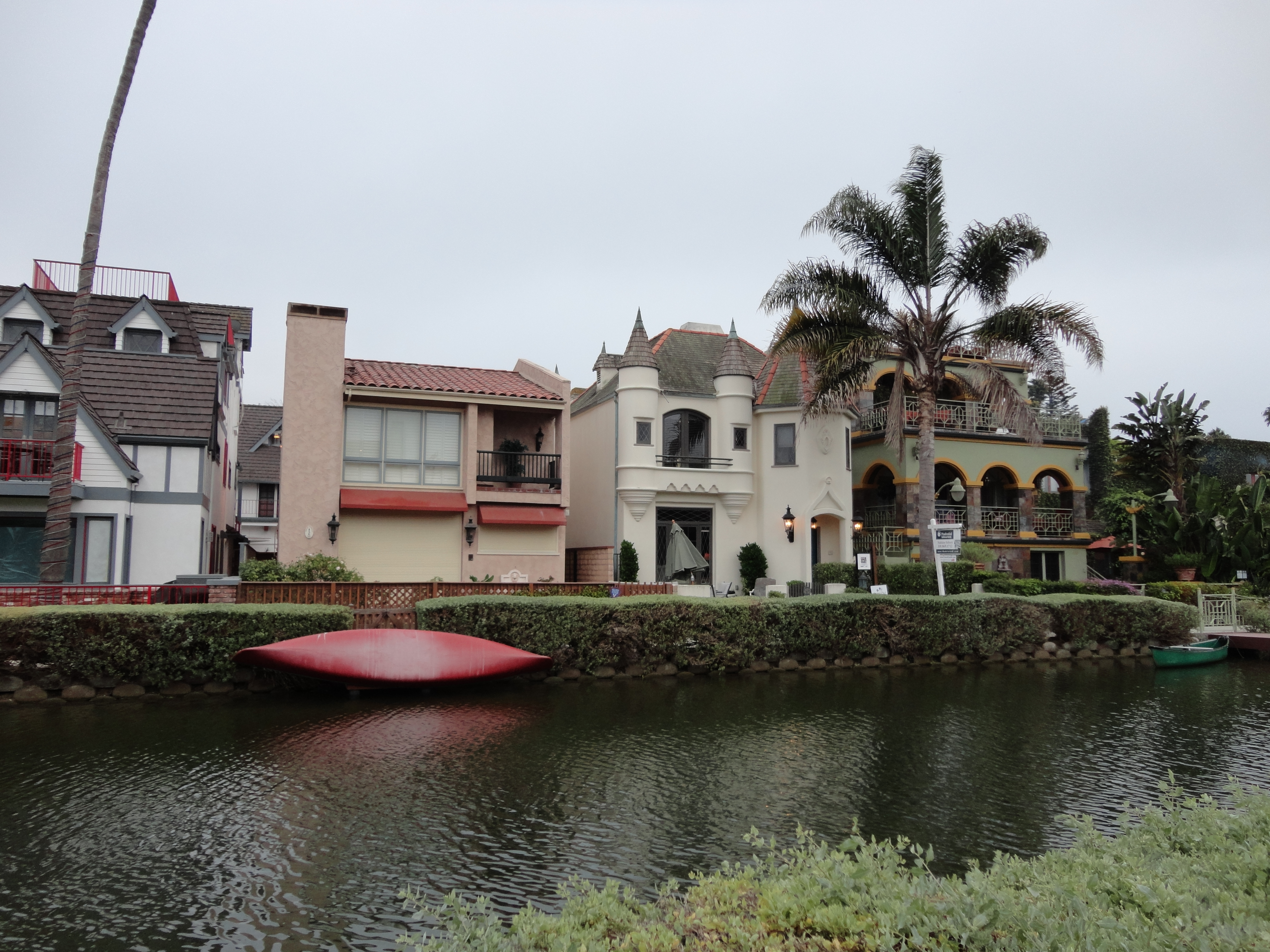
Bungalows on the Venice Canals, 2011

There were several attempts to rehabilitate, restore or improve the canals. In most of these cases the projects were met with opposition, eventually causing the plans to stall and eventually be cancelled. One of these attempts was a deep-water plan that was stopped in the 1960s. Initially the deep water plan had received City of Los Angeles approval. Assessments were sent to the property owners, and Mayor Thomas Bradley did a news photo with local residents of the first shovel. This project was to include access by large boats from Marina Del Rey into the Venice Canals. However, a lawsuit by Summa Corporation, the Howard Hughes Company, and a man named Mr. Green stopped the project. This was due to the canal water flowing from Marina Del Rey to the Venice Canals in a section called Ballona Lagoon. The Ballona Lagoon property under the water was owned by Howard Hughes and the Summa Corporation. Howard Hughes died in 1976, taking away any serious opposition from Summa Corporation.

A neighborhood group, the Venice Canals Resident and Homeowners organization, was formed by a few residents of the canals in 1977, to establish an assessment district to restore the canals. This organization name was shortened to The Venice Canals Association in 1983. The VCA obtained signatures of 77% of the property owners to form an assessment district and have the Venice Canals restored or rehabilitated. The VCA submitted to the city, and as a result the city engineers began to design a new canal improvement plan to bring back to the community. This plan was designed by Los Angeles City Engineer Luis Ganajas. Luis Ganajas was a bridge engineer. He was later credited with the street improvement project for Santa Monica Blvd. from the 405 Freeway to Beverly Hills.

The plan was presented to the VCA and residents with support and optimism. This plan was similar to the 1960s plan, with straight vertical cement walls, but only five feet high. This plan was designed for human-powered boats and not deep bottom boats. No deeper dredging would be required. The plan became known as the "Vertical Wall plan". The city began to move it through the process, and estimated the cost to be around 6 to 8 million, plus the city improvements of public areas like sidewalks, etc. for a total of 15 to 18 million dollars. The cost under the assessment would be shared half by the property owners over 10 years assessment on their property taxes, and half by the City of Los Angeles and the Federal government. The original assessment project was sponsored by the Venice Canals Association (VCA) in 1977 during Pat Russel's term as City Councilperson. The first attempted design was done by City of Los Angeles Engineer Luis Ganajas. The plan still faced opposition. Those opposing any improvements did not want to see the sidewalks returned to public use, did not want to pay for the assessment, and used the fish and wildlife as a red herring. Some mentioned the California Least Tern as an endangered species who foraged and fished in the Canals. However, the majority of the residents supported the plan submitted by the City of Los Angeles.

In 1983, Ruth Galanter was elected to the City Council office and inherited the Vertical Wall plan neighborhood sponsored assessment for improving the Venice Canals. The design was known as the vertical wall plan, similar to the Marina Del Rey walls. Ruth Galanter was not happy with the environmental aspects, the costs, the historical design and the safety of the Vertical wall plan, so one of her early actions was to stop the city engineers from pursuing such a plan. Galanter asked the Coastal Conservancy to review the options for the canals, and the state agency returned several plans suggestions, including one using a material called Armorflex. Armorflex was a web of open cement blocks that would allow for plants to grow in them. These were to be installed on a gentle slope to allow birds and wildlife to go in and out of the canals.

The majority of the neighbors who would be assessed by the new design were opposed to the Armorflex plan. Ruth told the head of the VCA improvement project, Mark Galanty, that she would be open to another plan if the VCA were to find something better. However, Councilwoman Galanter would continue with the new Armorflex plan. So Mark assembled a committee of the VCA to locate a new material. Loffelstein, or Loffel Block, was identified by a VCA site committee member Andy Shores as possibly meeting those goals. It allowed plants to grow inside the material, could be placed on a slope to allow birds and wildlife to climb out of the canals, was safe for small children as it allowed them to hold on to the sides, and or climb out of the Canals, and was lower cost than the Armorflex. Mark obtain the services of a local architect to help present an artist rendering of the Loffel Block plan. The first drawing included 55% banks with areas near the public areas at a more gentle slope to allow for birds and wildlife to enter and exit the canals. The plan was presented by Mark Galanty at a public hearing on the project. Councilwoman Galanter agreed to look at the alternative design.

Ruth agreed, and instructed the City Engineers to design a plan using the Loffel Block. However, they did not drop the Armoflex design. Meanwhile, the residents were polled: 78% were against the canals being redone using Armorflex, and 82% were in favor of the canals being redone using the Loffel Block. Councilwoman Galanter and City Engineers drop the gentle slope, and designed the entire project at 55 degrees. A test site was installed at Sherman Canal and Dell for the Armorflex. The Venice Canals Association was able to get the distributor of Loffel Block to install the Loffel test site across the canals from the Armorflex site. Both were planted with native salt water plants, and observed for quality. The ducks preferred the Loffel Block. Many of the plants died in the Armorflex. In addition, the Armorflex began to sag and shift, while the Loffel test site remained stable.

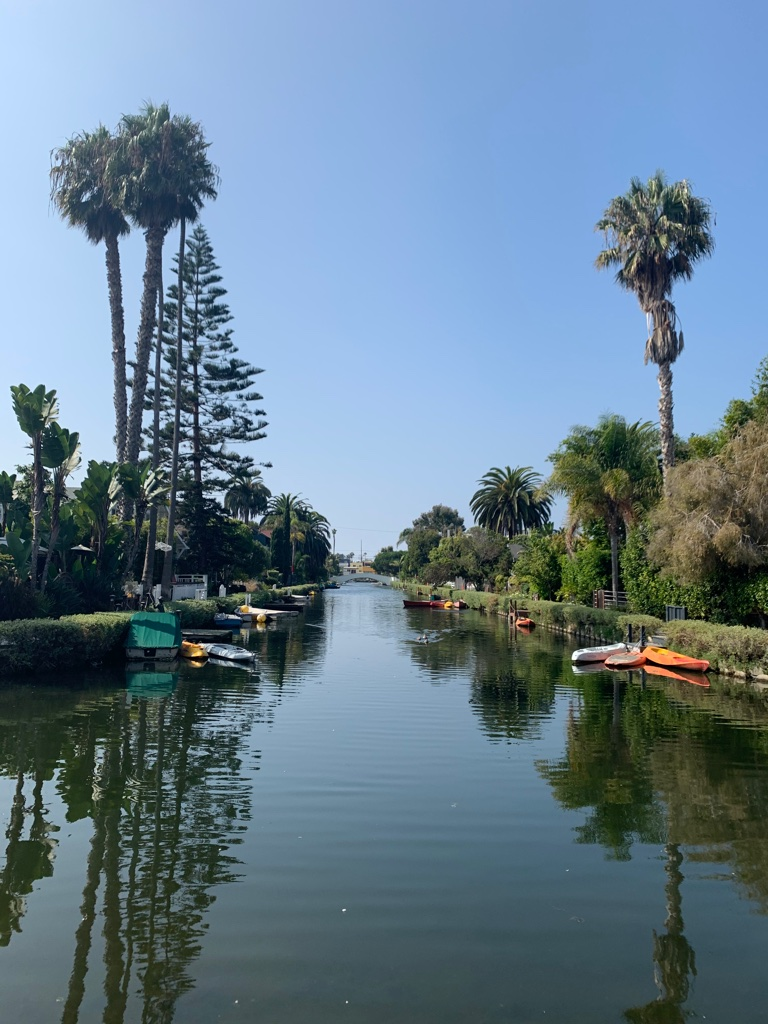
Venice Canals, 2019

After several years of study and review of both materials, Mark Galanty sent a letter to Ruth Galanter congratulating her on her success. She was able to meet her original goal of finding a material that would allow plants to grow, was environmental qualities, was safer for children falling in, was lower-cost than the original vertical wall plan, was closer to the original 1906 historic banks, and was approved by Coastal Commission and the many city agencies involved. The winner was the Loffel Block, and it now had the majority support needed for the assessment district to be approved. Based on this Letter, Councilwoman Galanter dropped the Armorflex plan and only brought forward the Loffel Plan. Mark Galanty, worked with the residents, property owners, and canal stakeholders to eliminate any opposition to the compromise plan using Loffel Block. The VCA negotiated a fund to pay for anyone that could not afford the assessment amount. No-one applied for the money established in this fund. The city designed the restoration to be built in two phases in order to not disrupt the wildlife (tern, Coots, egrets, herons, ducks, etc.).

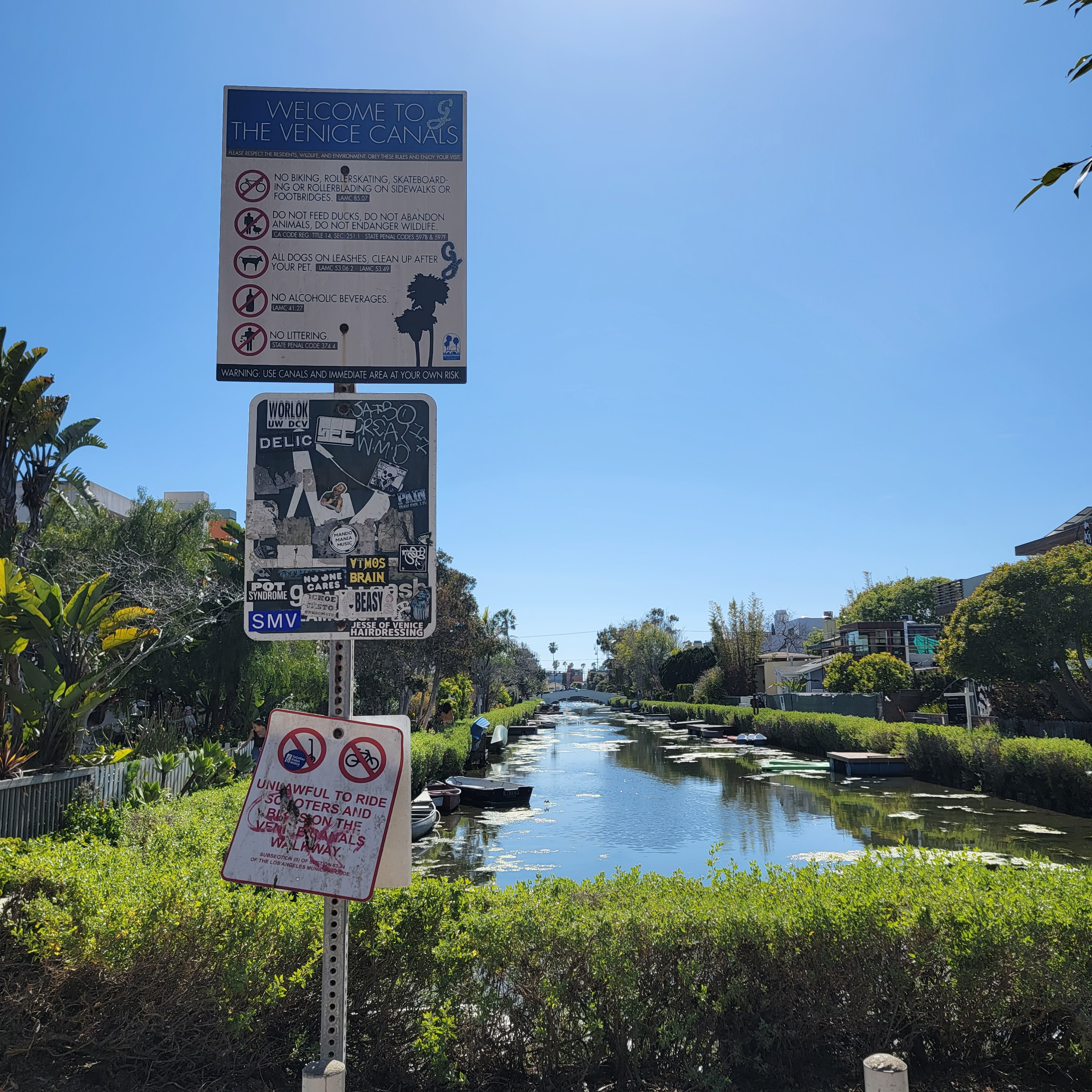
A welcome sign to the Venice Canals in 2023. The sign has been graffitied with stickers and markers.

Meanwhile, Councilwoman Galanter, negotiated a deal with the Summa Corporation, and other property owners under the Ballona Lagoon, to eliminate any issues with water flow rights to the Venice Canals. A deal was struck between the major underwater land owner to swap the city owned lots on the Venice Canals for land under the lagoon. Assuring the Lagoon and water to the Venice Canals would continue to flow in and out. The final hearing was the Coastal Commission, where there was no opposition to the Venice Canal Improvement project. Mark Galanty spoke on behalf of the Venice Canals Association. There were over 48 supporters in favor of the project, and no one spoke against it. Due to the signal of support from the staff and Coastal Commissioners, most of those in favor of the project passed on speaking.

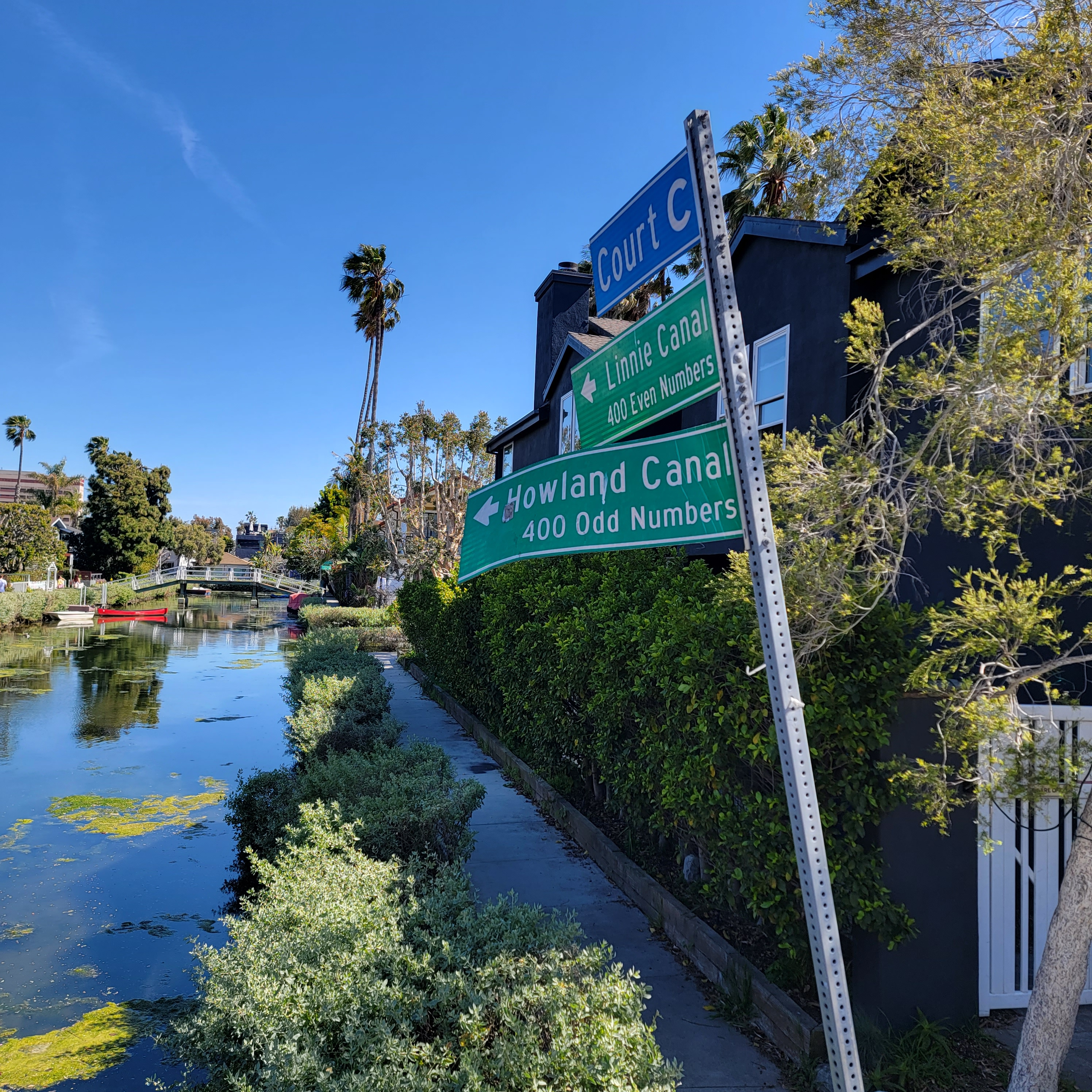
Instead of street addresses, homes are addressed by their canal. These canal signs are in a state of disrepair before the 2023 April cleaning to get rid of annual algae blooms

Councilwoman Galanter, and staff member Jim Bichart, as well as City Engineers Luis Ganajas, environmental engineer Russ Ruffing worked on the City, State and National approvals. At the Coastal Commission hearing the Venice Canals Association supported the plan, and there was finally no opposition to the restoring of the Venice Canals. The estimated costs for the improvements were 12 million dollars. 6.9 million paid as an assessment district. The project included dredging the canals and removing the soil to a class 1 toxic site, removing crumbling sidewalks, replacing new sidewalks, 5 feet deep in center, 1 1/2 feet on the sides, Loffel Block at 55 degrees through the canals. Rebuilding the foot bridges that go over the canals. The property owners in the canals paid approximately $6,600 over a 10 year-period for a 30 by 90 foot lot frontage, and $7,800 for a 40 by 90 foot lot frontage. Work began in March 1992, and was completed in 1993. The assessment could be paid in full, or paid over time with interest at approximately 5% interest.[31] As a result of the completion of the Venice Canals Improvement, the VCA held a carnival in 1993 with Gondolas, food, art, music to celebrate the rehabilitation and improvement of the Venice Canals. Two gondolas from Naples, a Long Beach, California neighborhood built on three islands, were rented to take passengers on the Venice Canals as they had in 1906. The Venice Canals celebrated the 10-year anniversary of the restoration with another party in 2003.

== See also ==
- History of Venice, California
- National Register of Historic Places listings in Los Angeles, California
- List of Los Angeles Historic-Cultural Monuments on the Westside
