= San Elijo Lagoon =

Coastal wetland in San Diego County, California, United States

Coordinates: 33°00′35″N 117°15′44″W

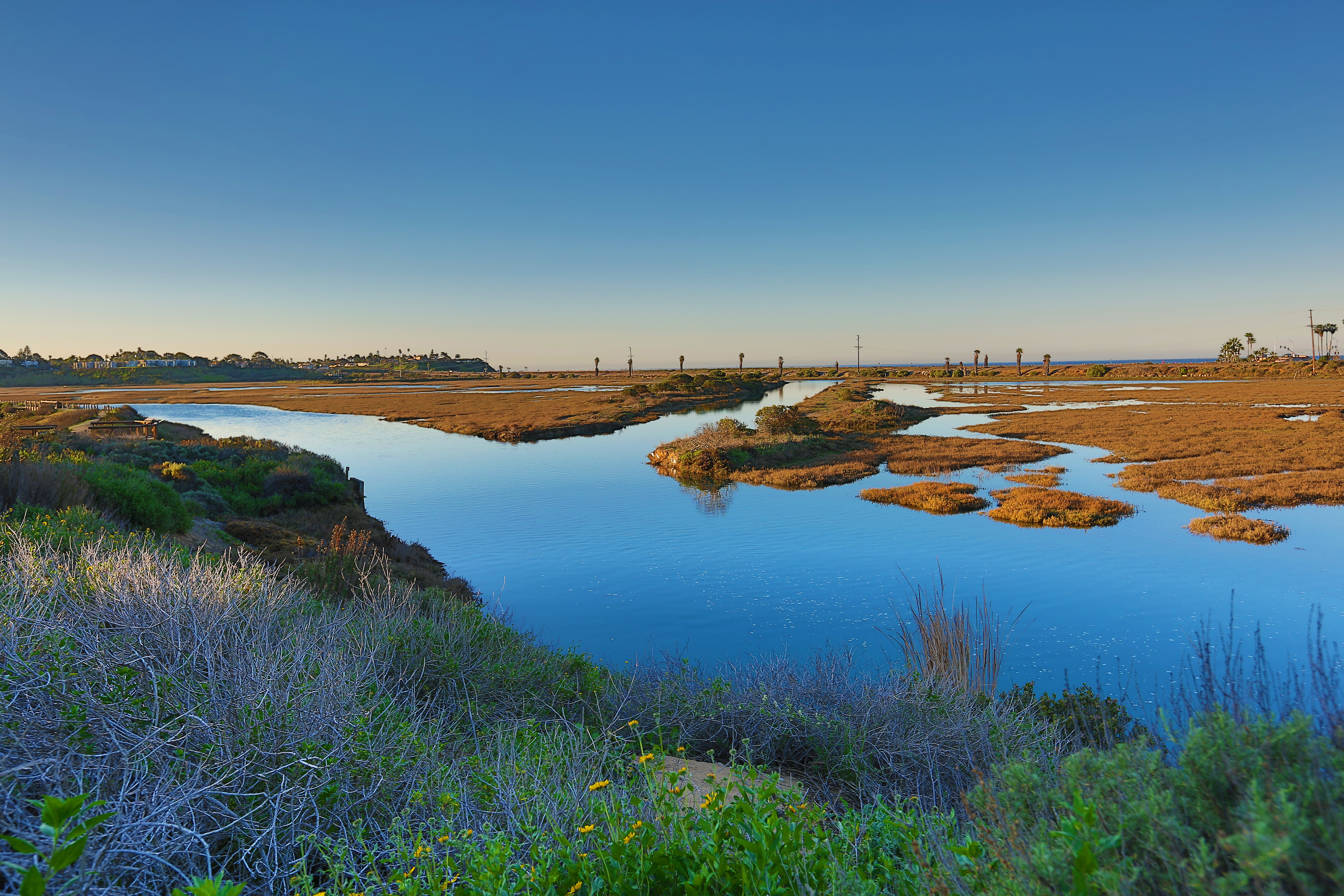
San Elijo Lagoon, 2015

San Elijo Lagoon Ecological Reserve is one of the largest remaining coastal wetlands in San Diego County, California, United States.

== History ==
Native American tribes hunted and gathered along the shores of the estuary at least 8,500 years before European settlers arrived. Shell middens, the refuse of hunting-gathering societies, show the earliest inhabitants relied heavily on coastal resources, including foods such as scallops, clams, shark, barracuda, bonito, and abalone. More recently, the Kumeyaay occupied the area. They traveled seasonally to take advantage of resources both along the coast and inland.

In 1769, the Portola Expedition named the area San Alejo in honor of Saint Alexius. In the early 1800s, Spaniards and other Europeans settled the region and established cattle ranches. The California gold rush brought an ever-increasing influx of people. Settlers established the community of Olivenhain, along Escondido Creek, as an experimental farming community. Farmers plowed and planted in the riparian corridors upstream of the estuary. It was the first time habitation had radically changed the vegetation and terrain surrounding the lagoon. Non-native plants were introduced that later proved highly invasive.

Between 1880 and 1940, dikes and levees were built that allowed duck hunting, salt harvesting, and sewage settling ponds. The most permanent changes were the construction of the Santa Fe Railroad's Surf Line in 1887, Pacific Coast Highway 101 in 1891, and Interstate 5 in 1965. Each required supporting berms that restricted water circulation and the natural influx of ocean water.

In 2016, as part of the North Coast Corridor infrastructure project, both road and rail bridges across the lagoon were planned to be replaced by 2021, in addition to environmental restoration of the lagoon and added preserved acreage.

== Geography and natural features ==
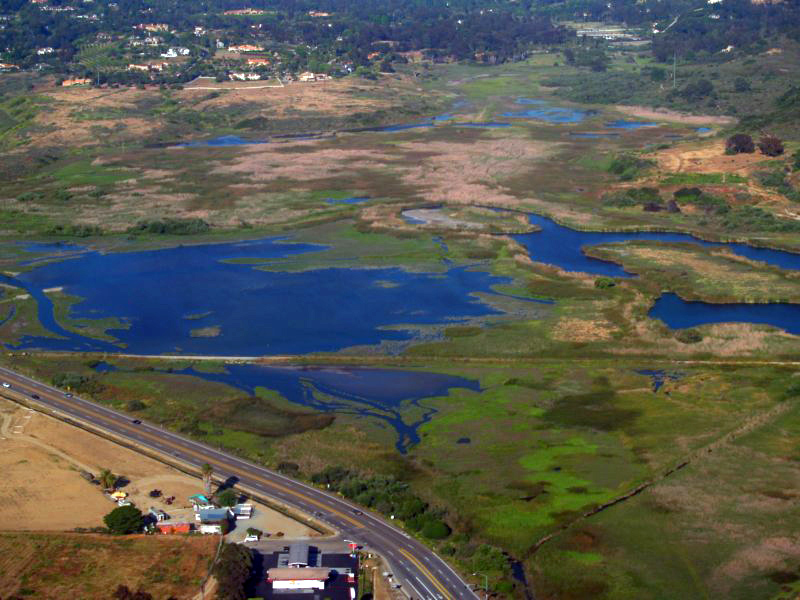
San Elijo Lagoon as seen from a helicopter, 2011

The lagoon lies within the southernmost part of the city of Encinitas and is bordered by Solana Beach on the south and Rancho Santa Fe inland and the Pacific Ocean to the west. The Reserve encompasses an area of 915 acres (370 ha). The lagoon is the terminus of the Escondido Creek watershed which covers an area of 54,112 acres (21,898 ha). The water in the lagoon comes from the Escondido Creek watershed and the Pacific Ocean.

The Reserve is managed by the California Department of Fish and Game, the County of San Diego, and Nature Collective.

== Habitat and wildlife ==
Within its 915 acres (370 ha) there are six plant communities: coastal strand, salt marsh, riparian scrub, coastal sage scrub, freshwater marsh, and mixed chaparral. There are more than 300 species of plants, at least 23 species of fish, 26 mammal species, 20 reptiles and amphibians, more than 80 invertebrates, and 300 bird species.

San Elijo Lagoon is part of the Escondido Creek Watershed. Within its approximately 54,000 acres (22,000 ha), stretching from the foothills to the coastline, the last remnants of an imperiled coastal scrub habitat connecting the northern and southern parts of an important ecological region. This coastal scrub habitat is vital to San Diego County's open space network and to the persistence of some of Southern California's most endangered species, many of which occur nowhere else.

== Nature center ==
Visitors can begin their exploration of San Elijo Lagoon Ecological Reserve at the San Elijo Lagoon Nature Center. The nature center provides a unique glimpse for the public to see "green" building concepts in use. The 5,600-square-foot (520 m^{2}) building is Platinum-Certified by U.S. Green Building Council's Leadership in Energy and Environmental Design (LEED). The two-story building is made from recycled materials and relies on solar energy, with natural light and ventilation. Visitors can see solar panels and irrigated roof plants. Recycled water is used in landscape irrigation. The Nature Center opened to the public in Spring 2009, replacing the former center that opened in 1988.

Inside are nature and history exhibits that detail the lagoon's plant and animal communities, Native American history, and the various natural and human influences that affect this sensitive ecosystem. San Elijo Lagoon Nature Center is San Diego County owned and operated. Rangers are on staff daily from 9 am until 5 pm, except Christmas Day. There is free parking.

== Recreation ==
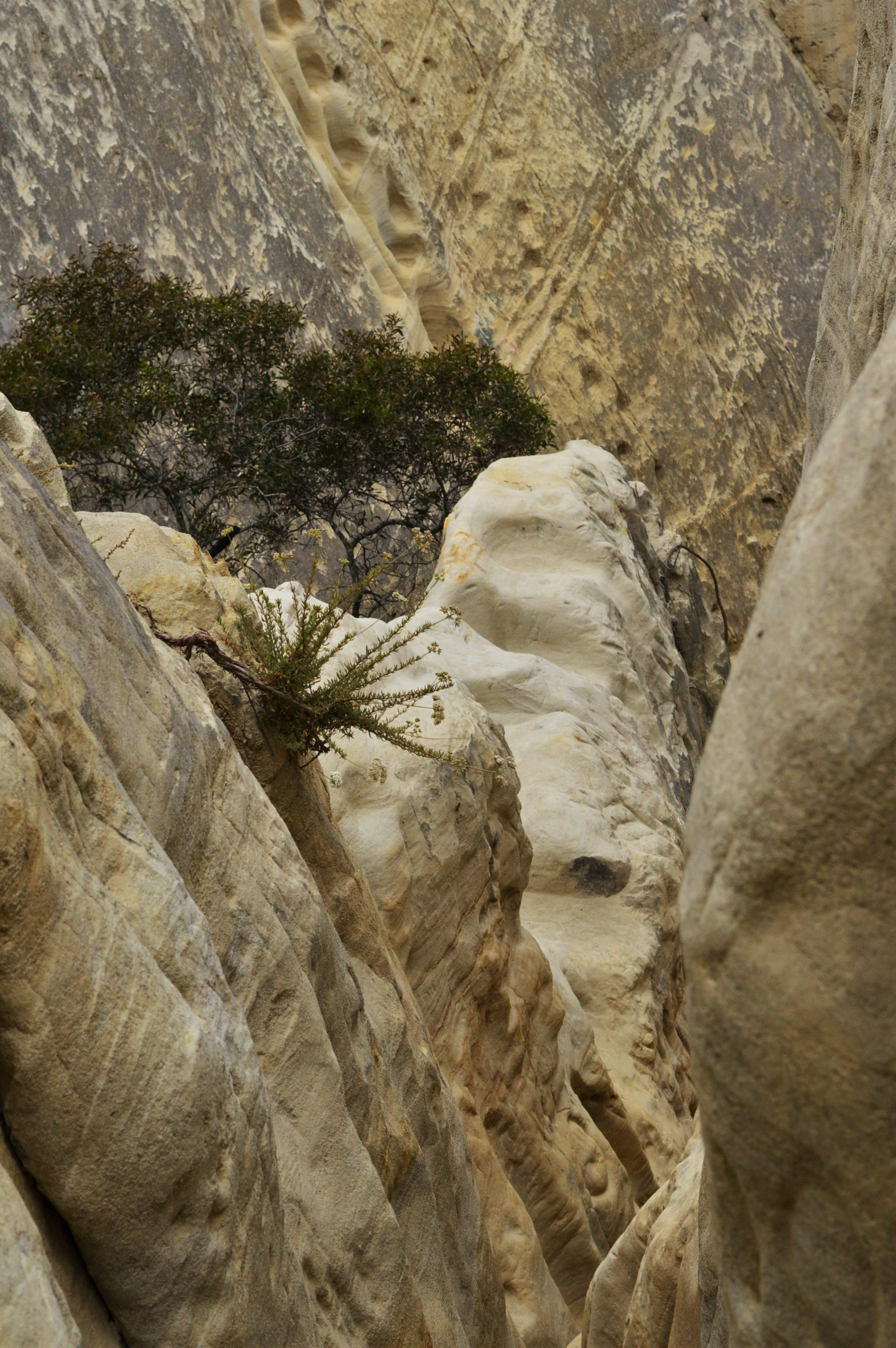
Annie's Canyon Trail

Eight miles (13 km) of trails, open from dawn until dusk, wind through distinct plant communities of San Elijo Lagoon Ecological Reserve. A short hike to see the wetlands begins at the Nature Center in a 1/4-mile (0.40 km) loop with views of the lagoon and salt marsh habitat animal sightings. Other trails take about 1.5 hours to complete. Most are considered easy to moderate for hiking and jogging. There are no restroom facilities located on the trails. Dogs are allowed on leashes. All wildlife and natural resources are fully protected in the California state and county reserve.

== Scientific monitoring ==
Successful efforts by County of San Diego, State of California, and Nature Collective have greatly improved water quality, habitat, and biodiversity. There are actively maintained projects that focus on water quality testing, habitat restoration, invasive plant removal, and bird counts.

There are continuous and weekly water quality measurements taken of the lagoon's water that test the water for dissolved oxygen, temperature, salinity, chlorophyll, and pH levels. The water measurements help determine the health of the ecosystem and also when mouth of the lagoon should be reopened. The lagoon’s mouth, located at Cardiff State Beach, is mechanically dredged and reopened each spring following the last winter storm. The opening of the mouth of the lagoon restores the tidal circulation between the lagoon and the ocean which ensures a healthier ecosystem.

Restoring native plants and removing invasive plant species helps restore the native habitat. This is important since numerous organisms rely on native plants for food and protection. Invasive plants upset the ecosystem by crowding out and out-competing native vegetation. The invasive plants are removed by either spraying herbicide or by manual pulling. Native plants are then planted to restore the habitat.

Bird counts are conducted on a monthly basis in the lagoon. Approximately 40% of all bird species in North America have been spotted in the lagoon. Conducting the bird count helps keep track of how some of the threatened and endangered species are doing.
