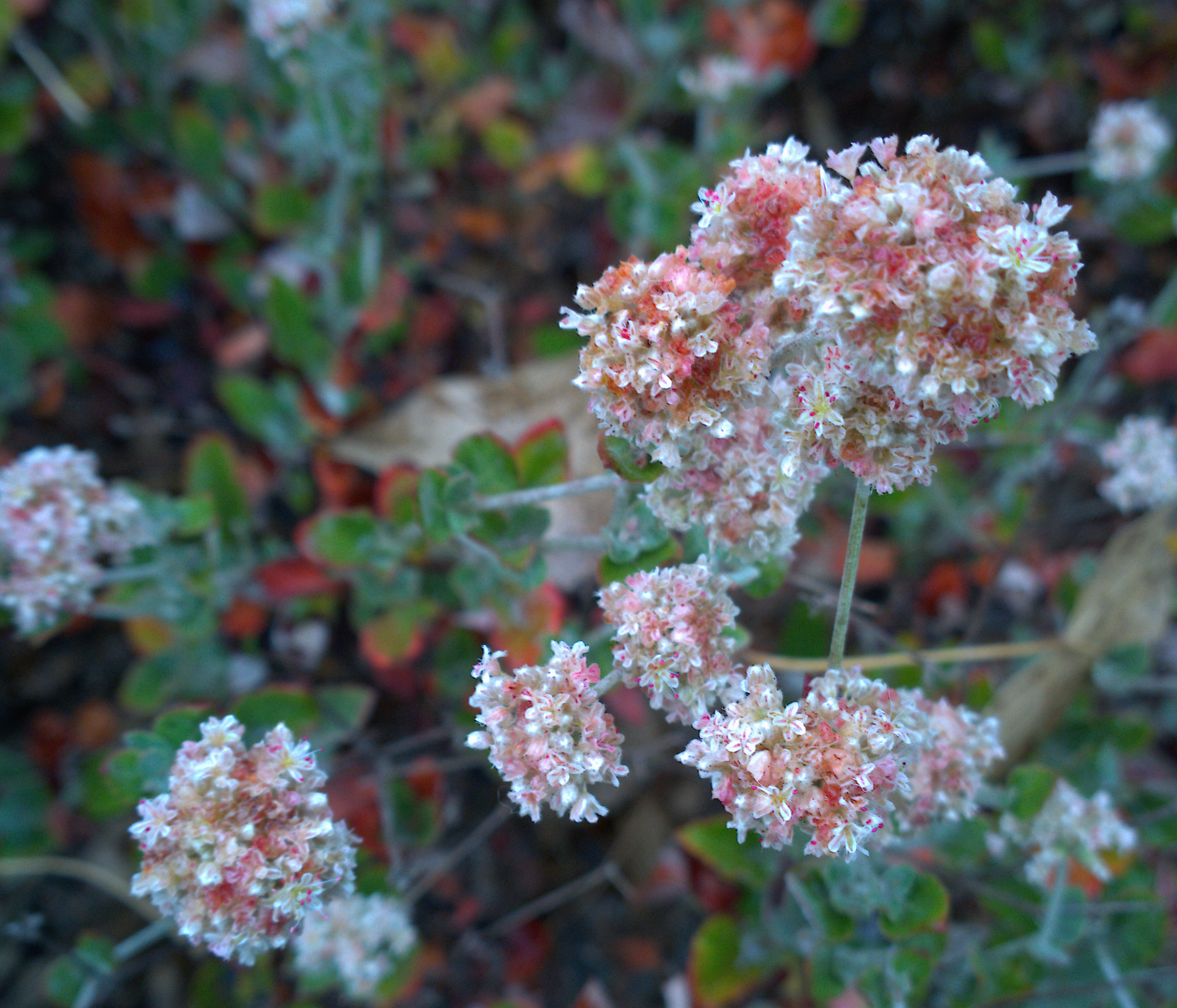

Conservation status
- Imperiled (NatureServe)

Scientific classification
- Kingdom: Plantae
- Clade: Tracheophytes
- Clade: Angiosperms
- Clade: Eudicots
- Order: Caryophyllales
- Family: Polygonaceae
- Genus: Eriogonum
- Species: E. cinereum

Binomial name
- Eriogonum cinereum Benth.

= Eriogonum cinereum =

Species of wild buckwheat

Eriogonum cinereum is a species of wild buckwheat known by the common names coastal buckwheat and ashyleaf buckwheat.

== Description ==
Eriogonum cinereum can reach from 2–4 feet (0.61–1.22 m) in height and width. It is light silvery gray in color due to the woolly hairs on its stems and foliage. The leaves are wavy-edged ovals one to three centimeters long.

The inflorescences stick out from the plant, each with one to several flower cluster heads of tiny tightly-packed frilly flowers which are usually light whitish-pink to brownish-pink in color, and quite hairy.

== Taxonomy ==
Eriogonum cinereum was scientifically described and named by George Bentham in 1844. It is classified in the Eriogonum genus within the Polygonaceae family and has no botanical synonyms or subspecies.

== Distribution and habitat ==
This shrub is endemic to the coast areas of Southern California, native in Los Angeles County, Ventura County, and Santa Barbara County and introduced to San Diego County.

It grows on beaches in coastal strand habitats and on bluffs and lower slopes of the Western Transverse Ranges, including the Santa Monica Mountains, in chaparral coastal sage scrub habitats below 400 metres (1,300 ft).

== Uses ==
This is the foodplant for Euphilotes bernardino, the Bernardino dotted blue butterfly. Buckwheats (Eriogonum sp.) are very important for various butterflies and native wasps.

=== Cultivation ===
Eriogonum cinereum is cultivated as an ornamental plant, for planting in native plant, drought tolerant, and butterfly gardens and other wildlife gardens, and for larger designed natural landscaping and habitat restoration projects.
