= JTBC Classic =

Coordinates: 33.093°N 117.285°W

Tournament information
- Location: Carlsbad, California, U.S.
- Established: 2010
- Course: Aviara Golf Club
- Par: 72
- Length: 6,609 yards (6,043 m)
- Tour: LPGA Tour
- Format: Stroke play - 72 holes
- Prize fund: $1.5 million
- Month played: March

Tournament record score
- Aggregate: 268 Cristie Kerr (2015); 268 Mirim Lee (2017)
- To par: −20 as above

Current champion
- (Thailand) Atthaya Thitikul

Location in the United States
Location in California

The JTBC Classic (officially the JTBC Classic Presented by Barbasol) was a women's professional golf tournament on the LPGA Tour, held in Carlsbad, California. The tournament was held at the Aviara Golf Club.

== History ==
The winner of the inaugural tournament was Hee Kyung Seo, a member of the LPGA of Korea Tour (KLPGA). She became the 19th non-LPGA member in LPGA Tour history to win an LPGA Tournament and the first to win as a sponsor exemption since Jin Joo Hong won the KOLON-Hana Bank Championship in South Korea in October 2006. With the win, Seo became immediately eligible for LPGA membership and was a rookie on the LPGA Tour in 2011.

In 2011, the event was decided by the final pairing on the final green. With both players tied at 15-under, Sandra Gal hit a wedge to within two feet (0.6 m) of the hole and Jiyai Shin was four feet (1.2 m) out. Gal made hers for birdie to win her first LPGA event by a stroke.

The event was formerly named the Kia Classic. In 2022, the title sponsor of the tournament changed to JTBC (Joongang Tongyang Broadcasting Company), a South Korean nationwide pay television network.

== Tournament names ==
Logo as the Kia Classic

- 2010: Kia Classic Presented by J Golf
- 2011–2021: Kia Classic
- 2022: JTBC Classic Presented by Barbasol

== Winners ==
Year	Date	Champion	Country	Winning score	To par	Margin of victory	Venue	Purse ($)	Winner's share ($)
2022	Mar 27	Atthaya Thitikul	Thailand	69-70-69-64=272	−16	Playoff	Aviara Golf Club	1,500,000	225,000
2021	Mar 28	Inbee Park	South Korea	66-69-69-70=274	−14	5 strokes	Aviara Golf Club	1,800,000	270,000
2019	Mar 31	Nasa Hataoka	Japan	69-70-64-67=270	−18	3 strokes	Aviara Golf Club	1,800,000	270,000
2018	Mar 25	Ji Eun-hee	South Korea	70-68-67-67=272	−16	2 strokes	Aviara Golf Club	1,800,000	270,000
2017	Mar 26	Mirim Lee	South Korea	68-68-67-65=268	−20	6 strokes	Aviara Golf Club	1,800,000	270,000
2016	Mar 27	Lydia Ko	New Zealand	68-67-67-67=269	−19	4 strokes	Aviara Golf Club	1,700,000	255,000
2015	Mar 29	Cristie Kerr	United States	67-68-68-65=268	−20	2 strokes	Aviara Golf Club	1,700,000	255,000
2014	Mar 30	Anna Nordqvist	Sweden	73-68-67-67=275	−13	1 stroke	Aviara Golf Club	1,700,000	255,000
2013	Mar 24	Beatriz Recari	Spain	69-67-69-74=279	−9	Playoff	Aviara Golf Club	1,700,000	255,000
2012	Mar 25	Yani Tseng	Taiwan	67-68-69-70=274	−14	6 strokes	La Costa Resort and Spa	1,700,000	255,000
2011	Mar 27	Sandra Gal	Germany	67-68-70-71=276	−16	1 stroke	Industry Hills Golf Club	1,700,000	255,000
2010	Mar 28	Hee Kyung Seo	South Korea	70-67-69-70=276	−12	6 strokes	La Costa Resort and Spa	1,700,000	255,000

== Tournament records ==
Year	Player	Score	Round	Course
2010	Inbee Park	65 (−7)	4th	La Costa Resort and Spa
2011	Jiyai Shin	64 (−9)	2nd	Industry Hills Golf Club
2019	Mi Jung Hur	62 (−10)	3rd	Aviara Golf Club
2019	Kim Hyo-joo	62 (−10)	4th	Aviara Golf Club

== See also ==
- La Costa Resort and Spa
- Industry Hills Golf Club
