= Batiquitos Lagoon =

Coastal wetland in California

Coordinates: 33°05′23″N 117°17′17″W

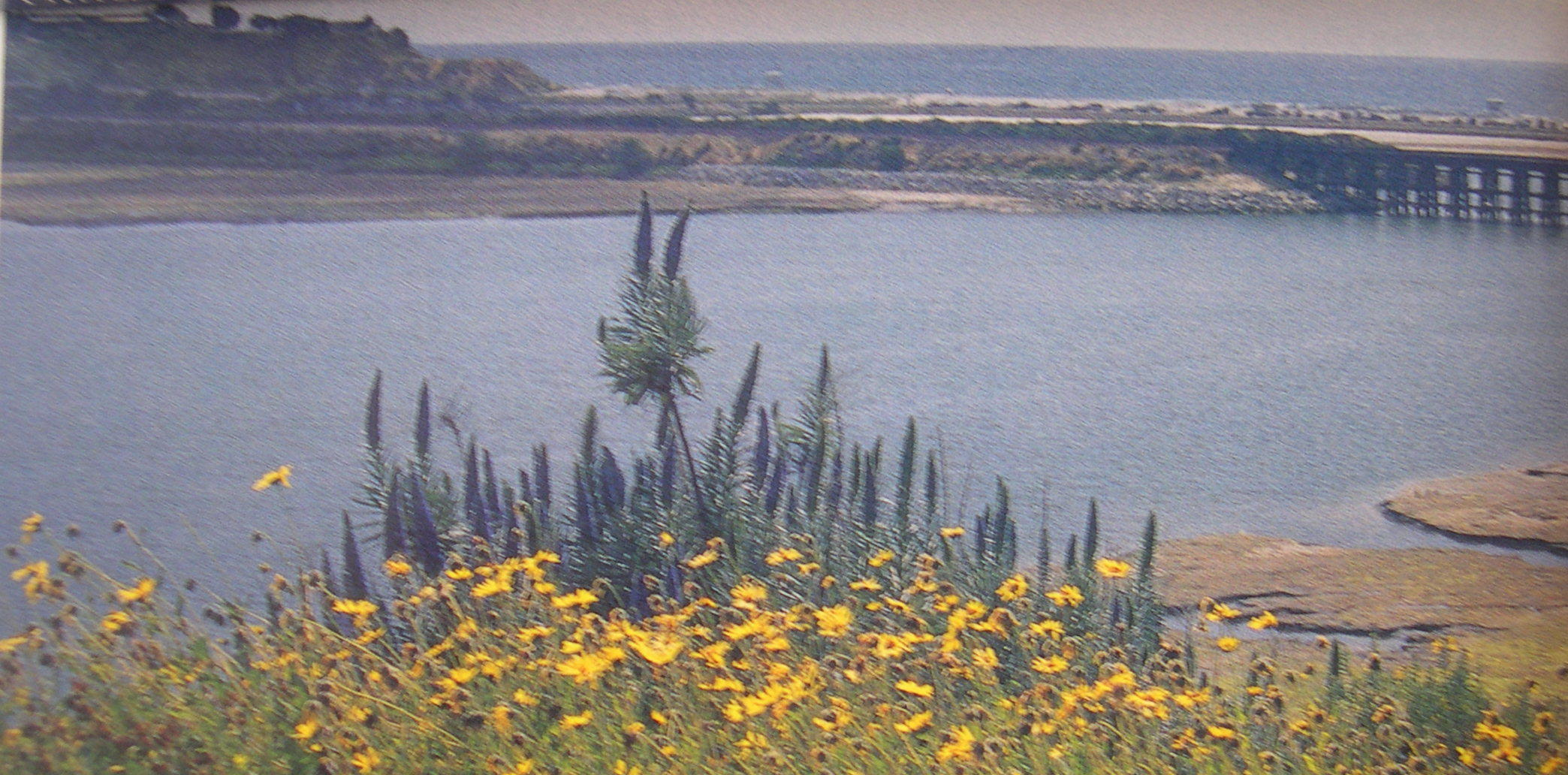
Batiquitos Lagoon

Batiquitos Lagoon is a coastal wetland and estuary located between southern Carlsbad and Encinitas, in the North County region of San Diego County, California. The lagoon itself consists of 610 acres with a drainage basin of about 55,000 acres. Its primary freshwater tributaries being San Marcos Creek from the east and Encinitas Creek which flows north along Green Valley, entering the lagoon under El Camino Real and La Costa Avenue, respectively. It is one of the few remaining tidal wetlands on the southern California coast.

== Nature Reserve ==
Part of the lagoon is designated as Batiquitos Lagoon State Marine Conservation Area, run by the California Department of Fish and Game as a nature reserve.

The Batiquitos Lagoon Foundation is a private non-profit organization that works to preserve the lagoon and educate the public about the natural history of the lagoon. The Foundation operates the Batiquitos Lagoon Foundation Nature Center, with programs and guided walks about the importance of the lagoon as a habitat for birds, insects, plants, fish, mammals and benthic organisms. The nature center is open daily.

The north side of the lagoon has a 1.75 mile nature trail that roughly follows its shore. The trail is generally wheelchair and stroller friendly.

== History ==
Evidence of human habitation around Batiquitos Lagoon dates back over 9,000 years.

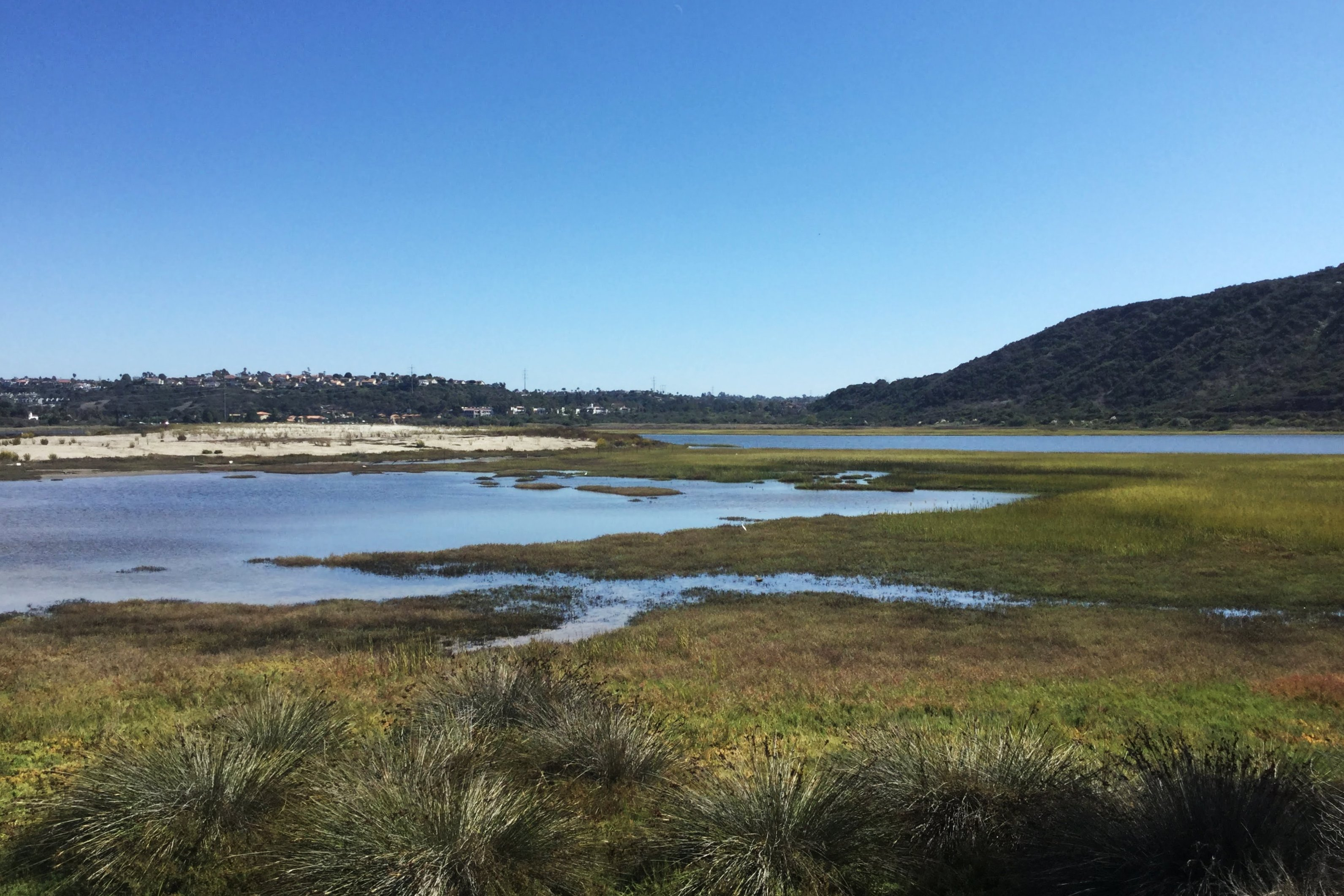
Eastern Side of Batiquitos Lagoon in 2021

The name "Batiquitos" is derived from the Spanish word batequi, a local northwestern Mexican term for a watering hole dug in a stream bed, in turn from the native Yaqui bate'ekim.

The area around the lagoon was opened to homesteading in the 1870s. Various building projects and roads around the lagoon over the next 100 years blocked the necessary ebb and flow of the tides and silted the lagoon up, making it largely freshwater. This had an impact on the ecosystem and reduced the fish diversity to only five species.

In 1997, the Port of Los Angeles et al. began the environmental restoration of Batiquitos Lagoon. Since the end of construction, the ecosystem of the lagoon has gradually changed from a confined non-tidal system with limited habitat value to fully tidal, salt water system with greater habitat value. Since the restoration of tidal action to the lagoon, the fish populations have significantly increased in numbers and diversity and more than sixty-five species have been found. Lagoons serve as breeding and nursery areas for a wide array of coastal fish, provide habitat and food for resident species and serve as feeding areas for seasonal species.

== See also ==
- Lagoons of San Diego County, California
