= Los Angeles County Department of Beaches and Harbors =

County Department of Beaches and Harbors

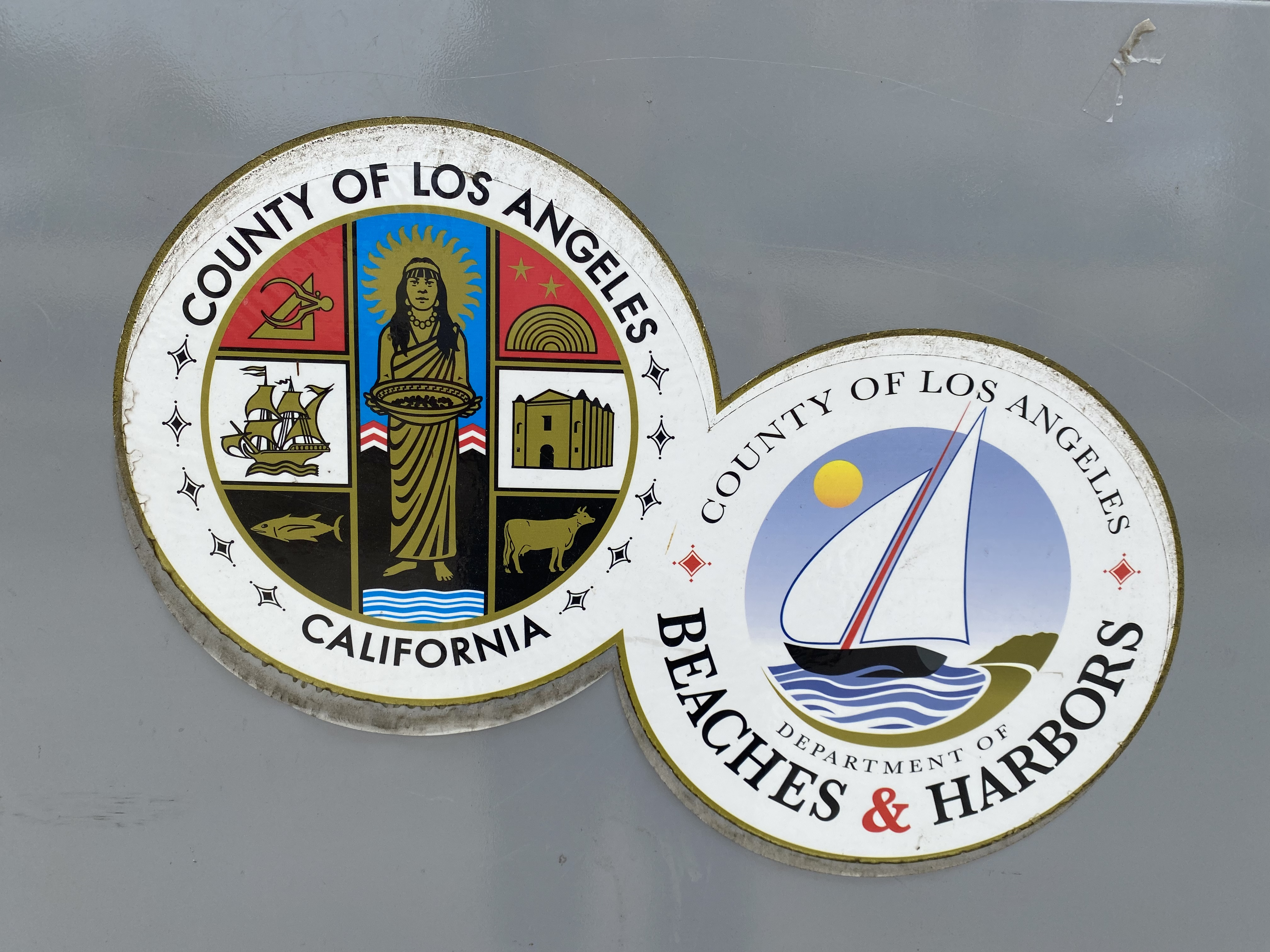

Agency overview
- Headquarters: 13837 Fiji Way, Marina del Rey, CA 90292; 33.9705°N 118.4460°W

The Los Angeles County Department of Beaches and Harbors is responsible for 20 beaches and the Marina Del Rey small-craft harbor in Los Angeles County, California.

== Marina ==
The department also manages the Marina Del Rey small-craft harbor, which has “4,600 boat slips in 23 marinas” and brings in nearly $60 million annually in revenue. The Marina function was added by the Board of Supervisors in 1954. The department also operates Burton Chace Park, and monitors raptor and waterbird nesting sites in Marina Del Rey's urban forest; tree trimmers wishing to work in the area must apply for a special permit.

== Beaches ==
Management of the beaches was shifted from the Parks and Recreation department in May 1969. L.A. native Dick Fitzgerald was the first director of the Department of Beaches. In 1976, Fitzgerald advocated for marine reserves to protect the tide pool ecosystems at Abalone Cove and Vista Sudeste. Circa 1975, when the city of Los Angeles handed over management of the “lifeguards, maintenance, parking and concessions” at their beaches to the county, the department oversaw 73 mi (117 km) of the 76.5 mi (123.1 km) of beaches in the county, including 38 mi (61 km) miles of “improved beaches.”

“The beaches surrounding Santa Monica Bay were visited by more than 42.5 million people in 1987,” according to the department's Lifeguard Division. The Los Angeles County Lifeguards were transferred to the Los Angeles County Fire Department in 1994.

The following beaches are owned or operated by the department, sometimes in partnership with the State of California or a city government:

- Dan Blocker Beach
- Dockweiler Beach
- El Sol Beach
- Hermosa Beach
- Las Tunas Beach
- Latigo Shores Beach
- Malibu Surfrider Beach
- Manhattan Beach
- Mother's Beach (aka Marina Beach)
- Nicholas Canyon Beach
- Point Dume Beach
- Point Fermin Beach
- Redondo Beach
- Topanga Beach
- Venice Beach
- White Point/Royal Palms Beach
- Will Rogers Beach
- Zuma Beach

Beaches and Harbors also runs the Dockweiler Beach RV parking and campground facilities, as well as Dockweiler Youth Center.

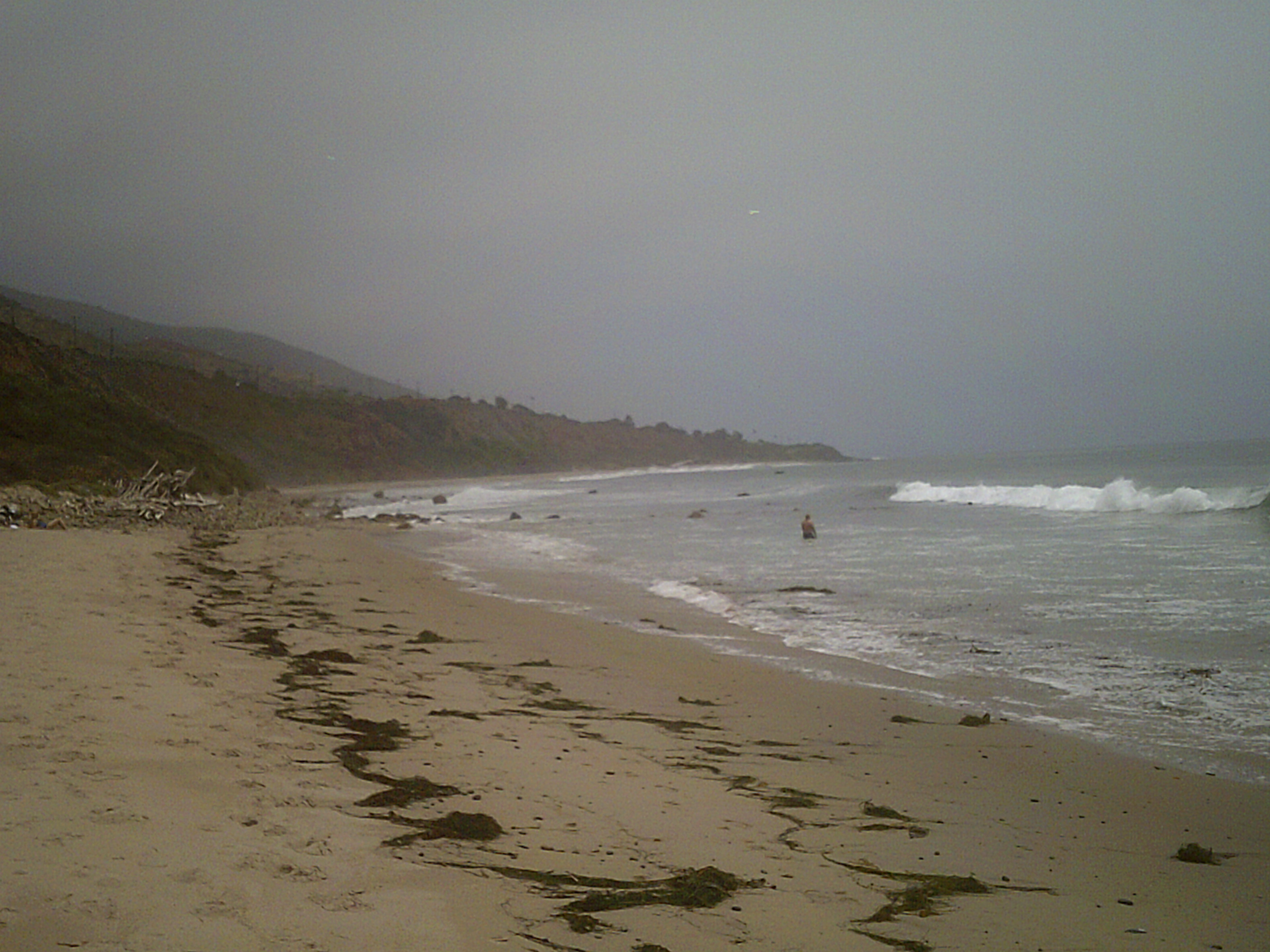
A view of Nicholas Canyon Beach from South Beach.

== Misc. ==
“Safety operations on state waters in county territory” are also under the purview of the department.

The Beaches and Harbors Dept. collaborates with the Department of Public Works in the management of Ballona Creek and watershed, Malibu Lagoon and Oxford Basin.

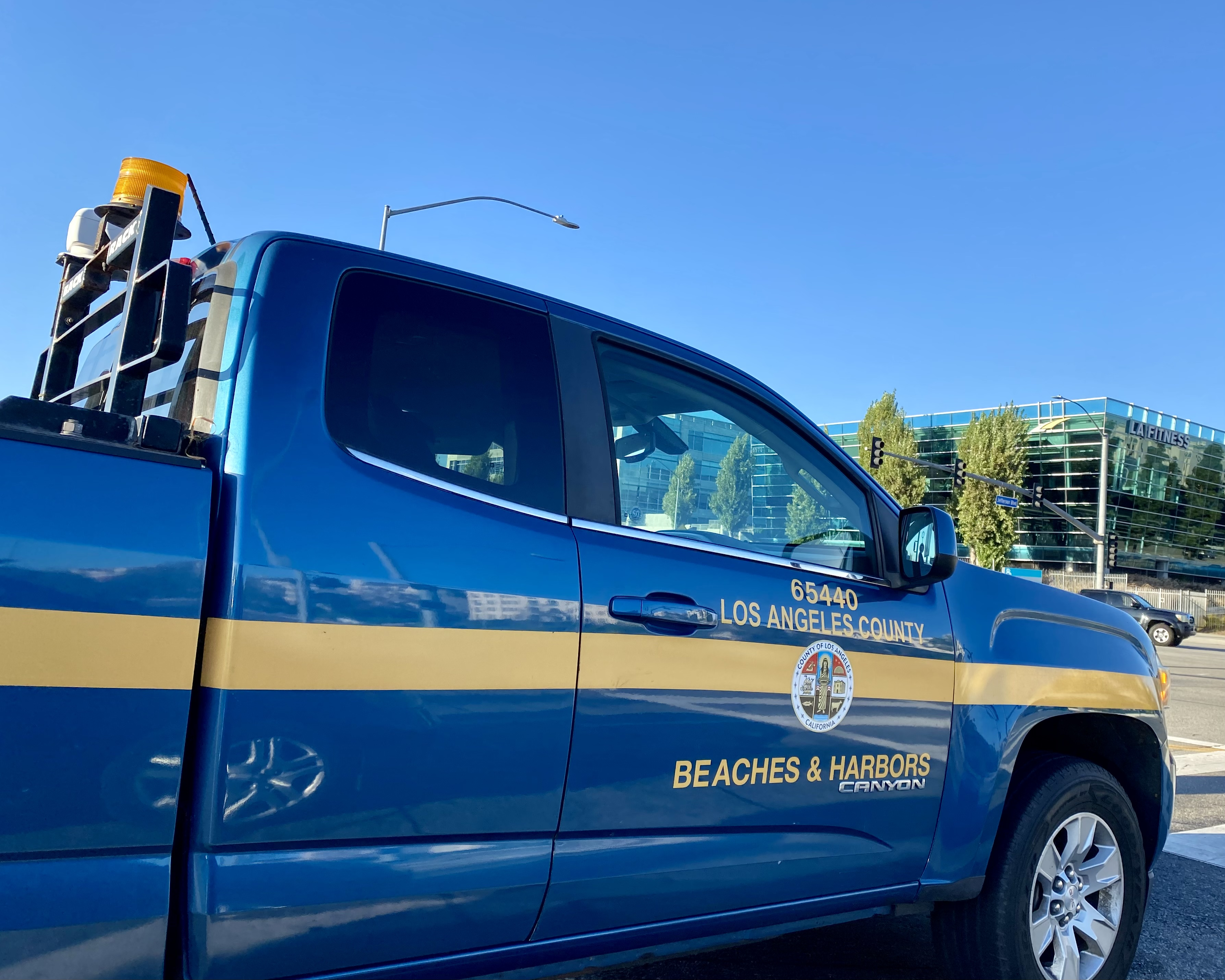
Los Angeles County Department of Beaches and Harbors vehicle

== See also ==
- Government of Los Angeles County, California
- Los Angeles County Lifeguards
- List of beaches in California § Los Angeles County
