= Blue Juice (band) =

Surf rock band

- Origin: Malibu, California, U.S.
- Genres: Surf rock
- Years active: 1972–1983, 2016-present
- Members: J. Murf; George Trafton; Don MacVicar; Jeff Ort; Sandy Morison; Richard Ickes; John Albert; Sammy Cammack

Blue Juice is a surf rock band formed in 1972 in Malibu, California, by Topanga Beach surfers J. Murf, George Trafton, Don MacVicar, and Jeff Ort.

== Background ==
The band chose their name because it expressed the energy of the blues combined with the energy of the ocean.

They sometimes invited guests to sing, like Jan-Michael Vincent, Gary Busey, Rick Dano, and Doug Avery. Guest guitarists included Bernie Leadon (Eagles), Andy Halpert a.k.a. Tony Creed (Surf Punks), and Denny Aaberg. Artist Norton Wisdom sometimes painted with the band.

Backup singers Libby Neal, Heidi Van Meter, and Andrea Weiner were called The Juicettes.

J. Murf was the main songwriter. The band's first song, “Easy and Bluesy,” was performed by Jan solo on the German talk show Drei Mal Neun in 1973. The band's last song was “Too Much Medication.” George wrote “Po’ Lil Rich Boys” about the Pacific Palisades kids. Don wrote “Gas Lines,” about the 1973 gas shortages, and “Lonely Road,” a collaboration with his brother Bobby MacVicar.

In the early 1980s, drummer Jeff Ort was replaced by Sandy Morison, and bassist Don MacVicar was replaced by Richard Ickes.

The band never released an album, but recorded demos in 1979, 1980, and 1981, at David Vaught’s Sweet 16 Studio in Hollywood. They distributed their demos on cassette tapes, calling sessions one and two 18674 Topanga Beach Road and session three Fresh Tracks.

The band's last show was at the Santa Cruz Civic Auditorium on March 11, 1983, playing at a screening of Hal Jepsen’s film We Got Surf.

On July 15, 2016, the band reunited at Casa Escobar (at the Malibu Inn), with bassist John Albert and guitarist Sammy Cammack.

== Discography ==
- 18674 Topanga Beach Road (1979, demo)
- 18674 Topanga Beach Road (1980, demo)
- Fresh Tracks (1981, demo)
- The Best of Blue Juice (2013, compilation)
