= Marina del Rey, California =

Census-designated place in California, United States

- Unincorporated community Census-designated place
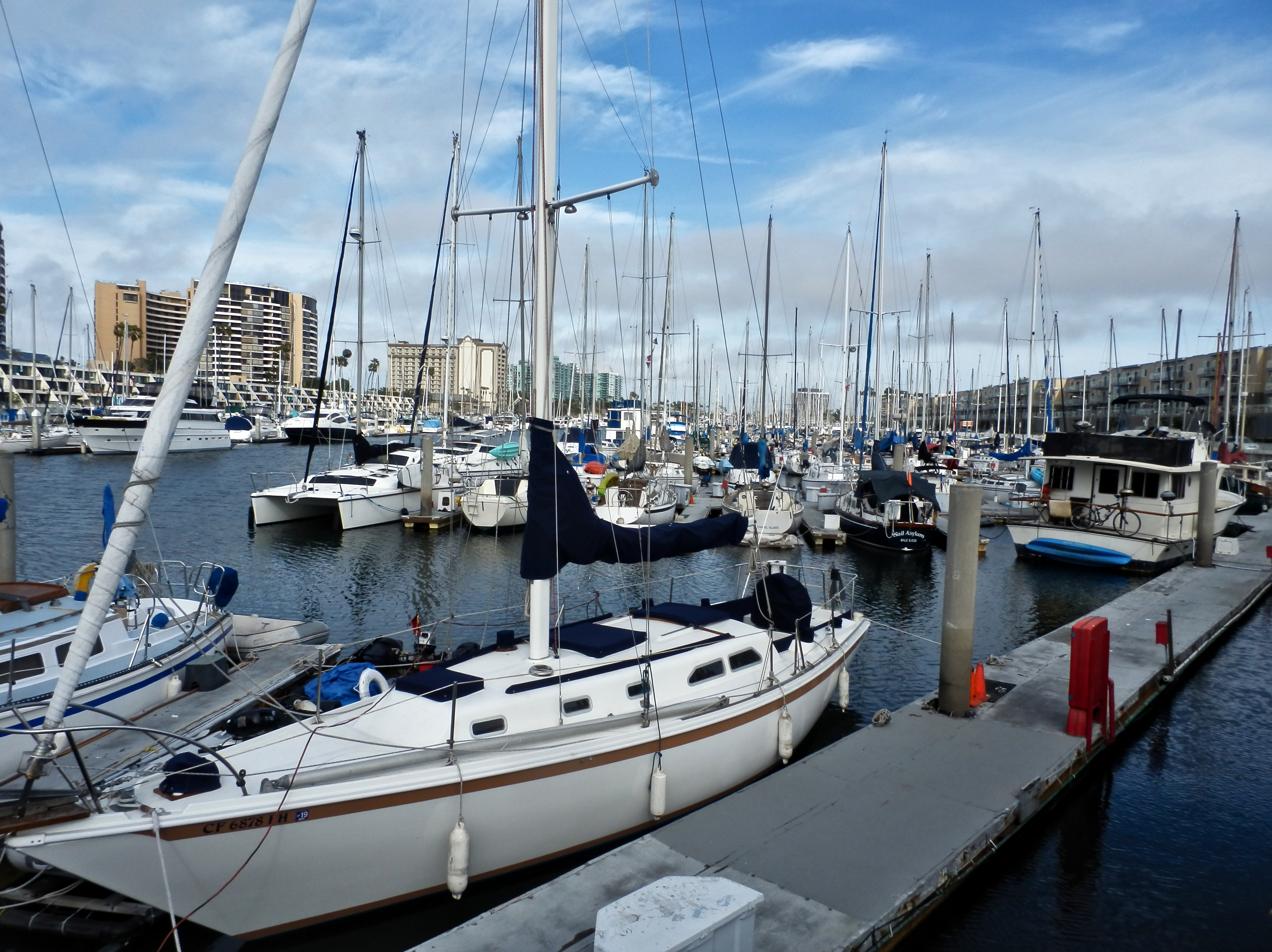
- A boat slip in Marina del Rey
- Interactive map of Marina del Rey, California
- Location within the Los Angeles metropolitan area Location within California Location within the United States
- Coordinates: 33°58′46″N 118°27′10″W
- Country: United States
- State: California
- County: Los Angeles

Area
  - Total: 1.455 sq mi (3.768 km^{2})
  - Land: 0.858 sq mi (2.221 km^{2})
  - Water: 0.597 sq mi (1.546 km^{2}) 41.04%
- Elevation: 0 ft (0 m)

Population (2020)
  - Total: 11,373
  - Density: 13,260/sq mi (5,121/km^{2})
- Time zone: UTC-8 (Pacific (PST))
  - Summer (DST): UTC-7 (PDT)
- ZIP codes: 90291–90292, 90295
- Area code: 310/424
- FIPS code: 06-45806
- GNIS feature ID: 1852255

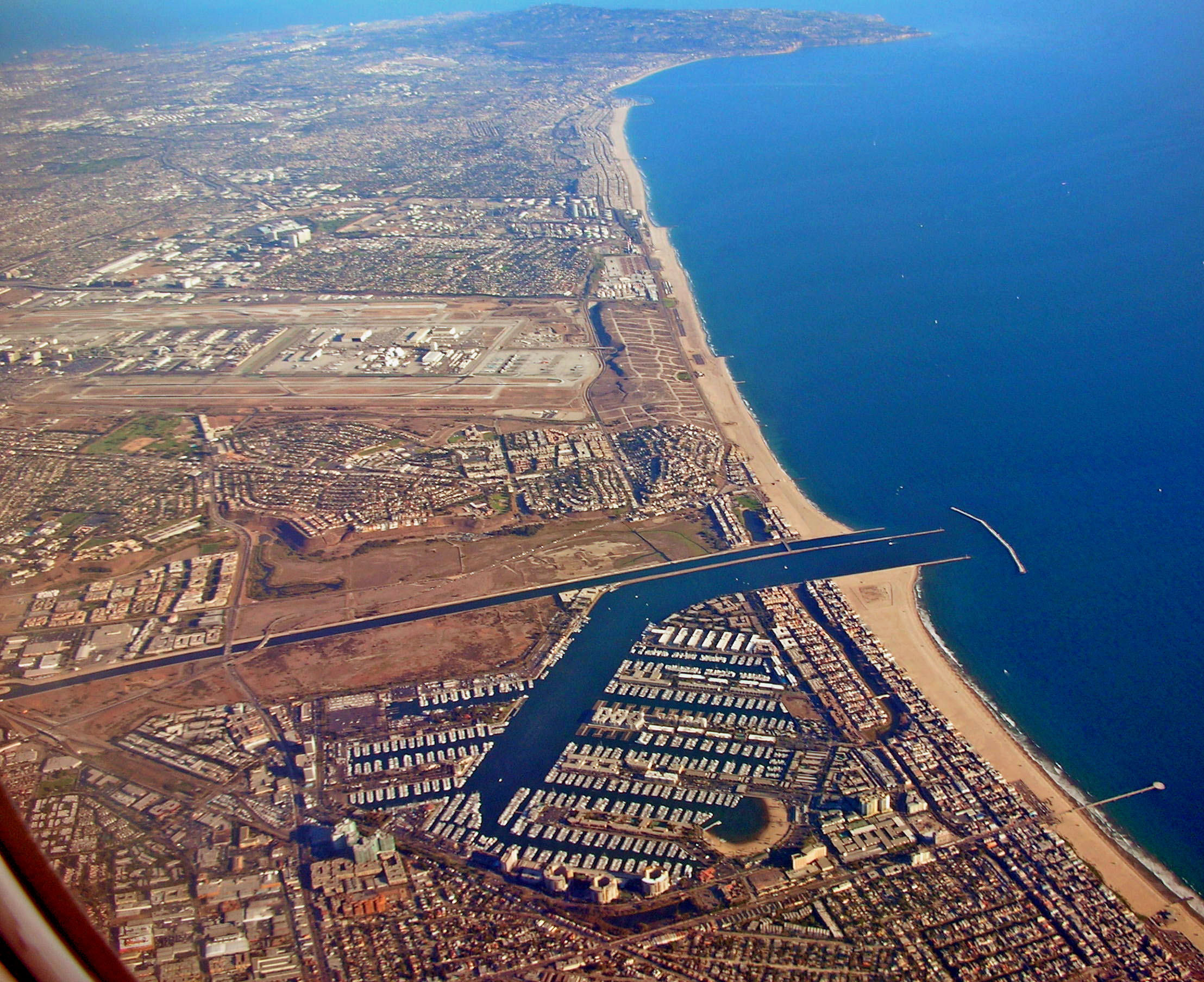
Aerial view of Marina del Rey, with Los Angeles International Airport and Palos Verdes Peninsula in the background

Marina del Rey (Spanish for "Docks of the King") is an unincorporated seaside community in Los Angeles County, California, United States. The marina, which includes residential, light commercial, and office facilities, is a major boating and water recreation destination of the Greater Los Angeles area. It is North America's largest man-made small-craft harbor with slips for approximately 5,000 boats. The area is a popular tourism destination for both land and water activities, such as paddleboard and kayak rentals, dining cruises, and yacht charters. Land activities include bicycling on several bicycle paths, walking paths along the waterfront, and birdwatching (birding). Wildlife watching opportunities include California sea lions and harbor seals. Dolphins and whales occasionally visit the deeper waters of the harbor. This Westside locale is approximately 4 miles (6.4 km) south of Santa Monica, 4 miles (6.4 km) north of Los Angeles International Airport, and 12.5 miles (20.1 km) west-southwest of downtown Los Angeles. It is surrounded by the City of Los Angeles.

The harbor is owned by Los Angeles County and managed by the Department of Beaches and Harbors (DBH), but the waters are environmentally regulated by the state and the federal governments through their many agencies and departments with overlapping oversight. The Los Angeles Times in a 1997 editorial called the harbor "perhaps the county's most valuable resource." For statistical purposes, the United States Census Bureau has defined Marina del Rey as a census-designated place (CDP). The population of the CDP was 11,373 at the 2020 census. The census definition of the area may not precisely correspond to local understanding of the area with the same name; for example, the 90292 ZIP Code includes all of Marina del Rey and portions of neighboring Los Angeles (including parts of Venice) as well as the far western portion of Culver City, and has a population of 21,576, more than double that of the CDP. Many residents of the 90292 ZIP code consider themselves to live in Marina del Rey even if they in fact live outside the official boundaries of the CDP.

== History ==
Before its development as a small-craft harbor, the land occupied by Marina del Rey was a salt marsh fed by fresh water from Ballona Creek. The area was frequented by the Tongva, who used plank boats, known as te'aats, to traverse the waters and to paddle out to the Channel Islands. Fishing and shellfish harvesting were common. The village of Guashna was a major regional trade center between villages on the islands and the mainland.

With the increasing arrival of European settlers, Moye C. Wicks thought in the mid-19th century of turning the estuary and the wetland of Playa del Rey into a commercial port. He formed the Ballona Development Company in 1888 to develop the area, but three years later the company went bankrupt. The area became frequented by duck hunters, including their hunting club, as well as by birdwatchers of the Los Angeles Audubon Society and the southern chapter of the Cooper Ornithological Club. Burton W. Chace, a former councilman of the City of Long Beach who later became a member of the Los Angeles County Board of Supervisors, referred to the area as mud flats, but the area would today more properly be referred to as an estuary and wetland.

Port Ballona was made by Louis Mesmer and Moye Wicks and then sold to Moses Sherman. Sherman purchased 1,000 acres (400 ha) of land around the Ballona lagoon and Port Ballona in 1902 under the name the Beach Land Company. Sherman and Clark renamed the land "Del Rey". Port Ballona was then renamed Playa Del Rey. The port was serviced by the California Central Railway opened in September 1887. This line later became the Santa Fe Railway, which later became the Atchison, Topeka, and Santa Fe Railroad. The rail line ran from the port to Redondo Junction. A street car tram line was made to the Port by the Redondo and Hermosa Beach Railroad company, which had incorporated on February 21, 1901. This company was part of the Los Angeles Pacific Railroad, owned by Sherman. The tram line opened December 1902 departed downtown at 4th and Broadway.

In 1916, the U.S. Army Corps of Engineers revisited the idea of a commercial harbor, but declared it economically impractical. In 1936 the U.S. Congress ordered a re-evaluation of that determination, and the Army Corps of Engineers returned with a more favorable determination; however, the Marina del Rey Harbor concept lost out to San Pedro as a commercial harbor and development funding went to the Port of Los Angeles instead.

Lighthouse concession stand at Fisherman's Village

In 1949, the US Army Corps of Engineers submitted an elaborate $23 million plan for a marina with mooring space for over 8,000 small-craft boats. In 1954, President Eisenhower signed Public Law 83-780, authorizing the study of the creation of the Marina as a federal project. After seven years of legislative wrangling, Public Law 87-402 renamed the Playa Del Rey Inlet and Harbor as Marina del Rey, implicitly enshrining the authorization of the project into law.

Groundbreaking began shortly afterward, during the early years of the Kennedy administration.

With construction almost complete, the marina was put in danger in 1962–1963 by a winter storm. The storm caused millions of dollars in damage to both the marina and the few small boats anchored there. A plan was put into effect to build a breakwater at the mouth of the marina, and the Los Angeles County Board of Supervisors appropriated $2.1 million to build it. On April 10, 1965, Marina del Rey was formally dedicated. The total cost of the marina was $36.25 million for land, construction, and initial operation.

Los Angeles County then solicited bids for the harbor and port development and sold 60-year leaseholds to willing developers. Real estate developer Abraham M. Lurie was the single largest leaseholder responsible for the building of three hotels, two apartment complexes, 1,000 boat slips, and several shopping centers, offices, restaurants; his holdings also included the last undeveloped piece of waterfront land in Marina del Rey. He eventually ran into cash flow problems and sold a 49.9% interest to Saudi Arabian Sheik Waleed bin Ibrahim Al Ibrahim, a brother of Waleed bin Ibrahim Al Ibrahim and a brother-in-law of King Fahd; the investment soon turned sour. After a protracted and aggressive lawsuit, Lurie lost his entire interest in 1993 in the development to Abdul Aziz.

== Geography ==
Marina del Rey falls within unincorporated Los Angeles County and is southeast of Venice and north of Playa del Rey, near the mouth of Ballona Creek. The harbor and port are located four miles (6.4 km) north of Los Angeles International Airport.

The harbor and the unincorporated residential and business community of Marina del Rey are bounded on all sides by the city of Los Angeles. The beach-style homes, on the inner portion of the coastal strand and the beach, west of the harbor, are within the city limits of Los Angeles, but share the same ZIP code as Marina del Rey. The name of this coastal strand (surrounding an estuarine inlet known as the Ballona Lagoon Marine Preserve) is the Marina Peninsula. The city street, Via Dolce, forms the boundary between Los Angeles and the unincorporated area of Los Angeles County known as Marina del Rey.

According to the United States Census Bureau, Marina del Rey has an area of 1.5 square miles (3.9 km^{2}). Nine-tenths of a square mile (2.2 km^{2}) is land and 0.6 square miles (1.6 km^{2}) is water (40.91%).

One of the highest and tallest building complexes in Marina del Rey (though it is technically just across the border, in the City of Los Angeles) is the high-rise condominium complex known as "The Admiralty High-Rise" or simply AHR. AHR is a large condominium complex of three buildings: The Azzura condos, The Regatta condos, and The Cove. AHR has a height of about 170 feet (52 m), 20 floors, and can house a maximum of about 2,500 people (800 condominiums), which is almost 30% of the population of Marina del Rey. AHR is located across Admiralty Way from the harbor and is a bright green-aquamarine color. It was built in 2003. AHR, or specifically The Cove, was the main location in the film Skyline (2010).

The specially designed harbor has many kinds of moorings with significant cement pilings for pleasure craft and large boats, including Catalina Island multi-passenger ferry boats, a large whale watching boat as well as a pelagic seabird watching boat, commercial fishing boats, harbor cruise ships, a US Coast Guard cutter ship, LA County Fire Department and Sheriff Department boats, and is surrounded by high-rise condos, hotels, apartments, shops, and restaurants. The area also includes the University of Southern California Information Sciences Institute, the UCLA Marina Aquatic Center, and the Loyola Marymount University boathouse. The Polynesian double-hulled canoe Hōkūleʻa docked in Marina del Rey in October 2023 as part of a four-year circumnavigation of the Pacific.

The community is served by the 3-mile-long (4.8 km) Marina Freeway (State Route 90), which links Marina del Rey directly to Interstate 405 and nearby Culver City.

The area codes of Marina del Rey are 310 and 424. Its ZIP code is 90292.

=== Climate ===
Climate data for Marina del Rey, California
Month	Jan	Feb	Mar	Apr	May	Jun	Jul	Aug	Sep	Oct	Nov	Dec	Year
Mean daily maximum °F (°C)	67 (19)	66 (19)	67 (19)	69 (21)	70 (21)	72 (22)	75 (24)	76 (24)	76 (24)	74 (23)	70 (21)	66 (19)	70.6 (21.4)
Mean daily minimum °F (°C)	49 (9)	50 (10)	53 (12)	55 (13)	58 (14)	61 (16)	64 (18)	64 (18)	63 (17)	59 (15)	54 (12)	49 (9)	56.5 (13.6)
Average precipitation inches (mm)	3.19 (81)	3.25 (83)	2.66 (68)	0.58 (15)	0.26 (6.6)	0.04 (1.0)	0.02 (0.51)	0.07 (1.8)	0.08 (2.0)	0.33 (8.4)	0.94 (24)	1.90 (48)	13.32 (338)
Source: IDcide

== Demographics ==
Historical population
Census	Pop.	Note	%±
1980	8,065		—
1990	7,431		−7.9%
2000	8,176		10.0%
2010	8,866		8.4%
2020	11,373		28.3%
U.S. Decennial Census; 1860–1870 1880-1890; 1900 1910 1920; 1930 1940 1950; 1960 1970 1980; 1990 2000 2010; 2020

Marina del Rey first appeared as a census designated place in the 1980 United States census as part of the Los Angeles census county division.

=== Racial and ethnic composition ===
Marina del Rey CDP, California – Racial and ethnic composition Note: the US Census treats Hispanic/Latino as an ethnic category. This table excludes Latinos from the racial categories and assigns them to a separate category. Hispanics/Latinos may be of any race.
Race / Ethnicity (NH = Non-Hispanic)	Pop 2000	Pop 2010	Pop 2020	% 2000	% 2010	% 2020
White alone (NH)	6,443	6,624	8,099	78.80%	74.71%	71.21%
Black or African American alone (NH)	377	453	503	4.61%	5.11%	4.42%
Native American or Alaska Native alone (NH)	10	16	10	0.12%	0.18%	0.09%
Asian alone (NH)	664	736	841	8.12%	8.30%	7.39%
Native Hawaiian or Pacific Islander alone (NH)	13	10	17	0.16%	0.11%	0.15%
Other race alone (NH)	28	25	145	0.34%	0.28%	1.27%
Mixed race or Multiracial (NH)	204	316	637	2.50%	3.56%	5.60%
Hispanic or Latino (any race)	437	686	1,121	5.34%	7.74%	9.86%
Total	8,176	8,866	11,373	100.00%	100.00%	100.00%

=== 2020 census ===
As of the 2020 census, Marina del Rey had a population of 11,373. The median age was 38.7 years. 7.5% of residents were under the age of 18 and 14.2% of residents were 65 years of age or older. For every 100 females there were 100.2 males, and for every 100 females age 18 and over there were 100.6 males age 18 and over.

100.0% of residents lived in urban areas, while 0.0% lived in rural areas.

There were 6,818 households in Marina del Rey, of which 8.8% had children under the age of 18 living in them. Of all households, 26.2% were married-couple households, 30.9% were households with a male householder and no spouse or partner present, and 30.8% were households with a female householder and no spouse or partner present. About 49.1% of all households were made up of individuals and 11.4% had someone living alone who was 65 years of age or older.

There were 8,065 housing units, of which 15.5% were vacant. The homeowner vacancy rate was 2.2% and the rental vacancy rate was 11.8%.

=== 2010 census ===
The 2010 United States census reported that Marina del Rey had a population of 8,866, of whom 80% are White (75% Non-Hispanic White), 8% Asian, 8% Hispanic or Latino, and 5% African American. Marina del Rey had a median household income of $95,248, with 9.9% of the population living below the federal poverty line.

== Economy ==
=== Technology ===
- Mobalytics, an American Esports company based in Marina del Rey, provides visual analytics and performance data to competitive gamers.

== Arts and culture ==
Marina Music shop on Centinela Avenue near Culver Boulevard

=== Points of interest ===
- California Yacht Club
- Fisherman's Village
- Lloyd Taber Marina del Rey Library
- Pacific Mariners Yacht Club
- UCLA Marina Aquatic Center

=== Public libraries ===
The County of Los Angeles Public Library operates the Lloyd Taber-Marina del Rey Library. The library has a nautical collection to serve small boaters in the area. The Abbot Kinney Memorial Branch of the Los Angeles Public Library is in Venice.

== Parks and recreational spaces ==
- Burton Chace Park hosts community festivals such as the Marina del Rey Summer Concert Series and the Marina del Rey Holiday Boat Parade.
- Yvonne B. Burke Park was renamed from the original Admiralty Park in 2009 to honor longtime Los Angeles County Supervisor Yvonne Brathwaite Burke. This linear (~40 yards (37 m) by ~700 yards (640 m)) park was built on the former Venice–Inglewood Line Pacific Electric right-of-way.
- Marvin Braude Bike Trail wends through Burke Park toward Oxford Basin, which is a wildlife habitat area with a pedestrian loop. Nearby Ballona Lagoon on Marina Peninsula also has a walking loop and wildlife viewing stations.
- Aubrey E. Austin Park is a very small park.
- Marina Beach, aka Mother's Beach, has a playground on the sand. Stand-up paddleboarding (SUP) is a popular water activity in Marina del Rey, taking advantage of the harbor's calm, protected waters. The marine environment supports year-round paddling and provides opportunities for wildlife encounters, including California sea lions that have established permanent colonies on floating docks throughout the inner harbor channels. Gray whales migrate through adjacent Santa Monica Bay between December and April.
- Area A of the Ballona Wetlands Ecological Reserve, located adjacent to Fiji Way, is accessible to the public for limited hours Wednesday through Saturday.

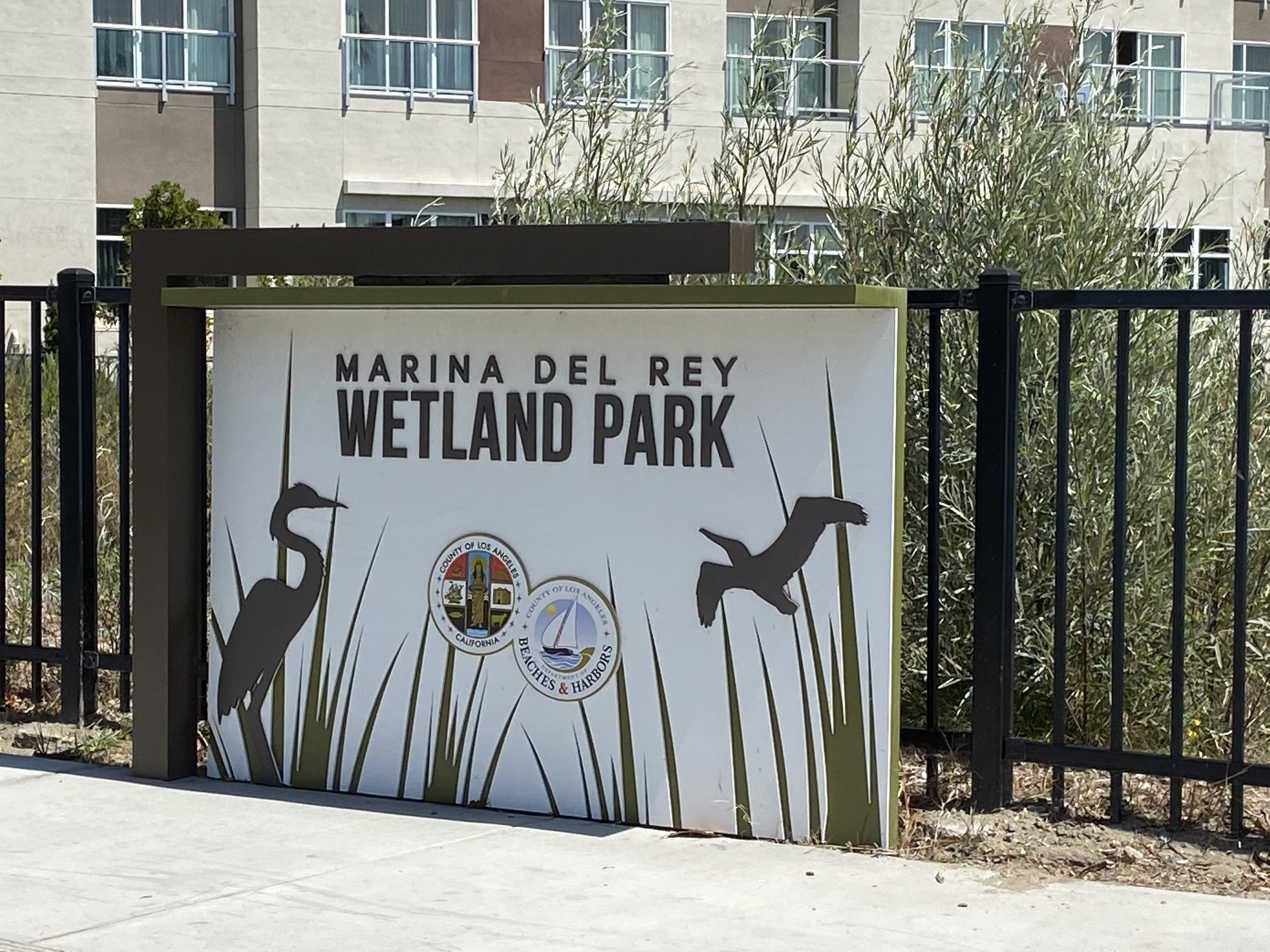
Marina Del Rey Wetland Park sign

- Marina Del Rey Wetland Park is a 0.75-acre (3,000 m^{2}) park and wildlife area that is part of Ballona watershed ecosystem; the tidal salt marsh was refurbished in 2017 by L.A. County. Improvements included restoring a "degraded wetland" and installing "public walking paths, observation areas and educational signage." The street address is 4390 Via Marina, Marina del Rey, CA 90292 at Via Marina and Tahiti Way. Public parking for visitors is available in the MDR parking lot number 11 at the corner of Via Marina and Panay Way. The park is managed by Los Angeles County Department of Beaches and Harbors.
- Harold L. Edgington Memorial Park is a small park and green space located at the intersection of Admiralty Way and Panay Way. The park is dedicated to Los Angeles County Harbor Patrolman Harold L. Edgington, who was killed in the line of duty near this same intersection on September 30, 1979.
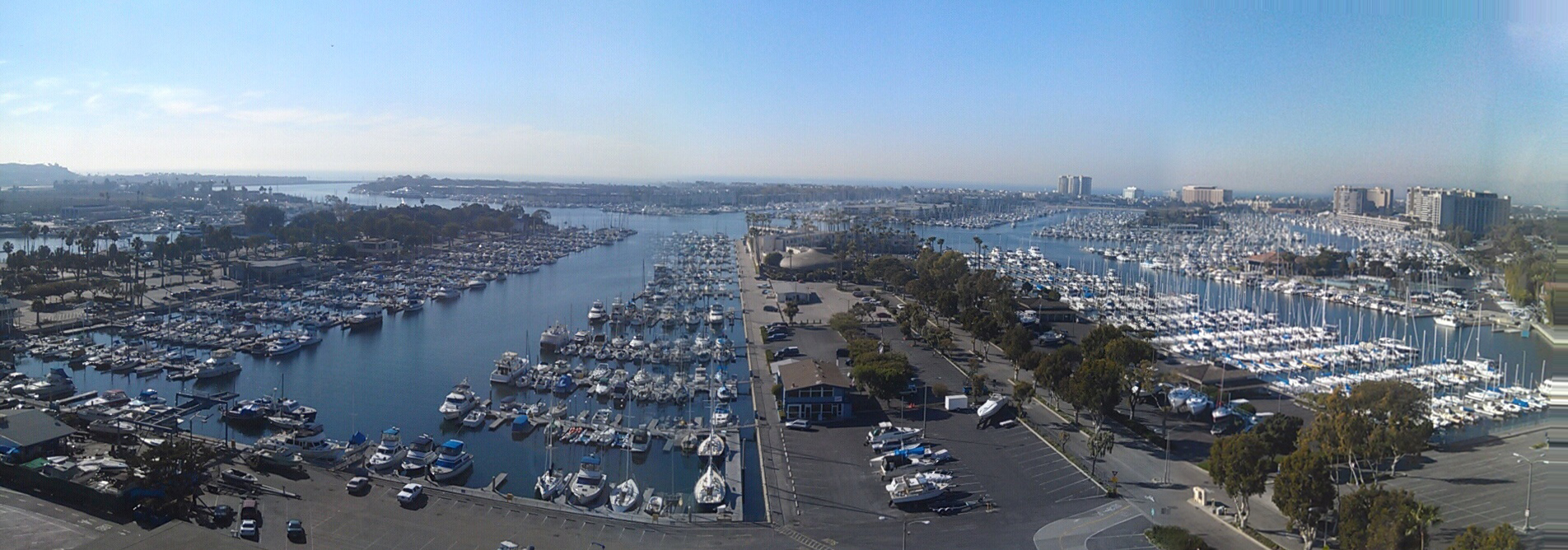
View taken from eastern Marina del Rey looking west toward Pacific Ocean

== Government ==
Marina del Rey is managed by the Los Angeles County Department of Beaches and Harbors. All of the area's land is owned by the County of Los Angeles, which issues long-term leases.

Marina del Rey is in the Second District of the Los Angeles County Board of Supervisors, represented by Holly Mitchell.

In the California State Legislature, Marina del Rey is in the 24th senatorial district, represented by Democrat Ben Allen, and in the 61st Assembly district, represented by Democrat Tina McKinnor.

In the United States House of Representatives, Marina del Rey is in California's 36th congressional district, represented by Democrat Ted Lieu.

== Education ==
Marina del Rey is served by the Los Angeles Unified School District, although there are no schools in the area proper. Students from Marina del Rey attend either Anchorage Street Elementary (now Westside Global Awareness Magnet School) or Coeur d'Alene Avenue Elementary School, Marina del Rey Middle School, and Venice High School.

== Infrastructure ==
The Los Angeles County Sheriff's Department (LASD) has a substation in Marina del Rey. Before 1985, maritime and land law enforcement was provided by the Los Angeles County Harbor Patrol, a division of the Department of Small Craft Harbors. The Harbor Patrol was merged into the Sheriff's Department, with sworn Harbor Patrol officers becoming Deputy Sheriffs.

The Los Angeles County Fire Department (LACFD) serves Marina del Rey and is based at Station #110, a part of Battalion 1, at 4433 Admiralty Way. The Los Angeles County Department of Health Services has an office in Marina del Rey.

=== Transportation ===
The Marina Expressway, California State Route 90, terminates at Lincoln Boulevard (California State Route 1) in northeastern Marina del Rey and links the area with Culver City. A water shuttle service, the WaterBus, operates on select days, typically weekends and holidays, during the summer months.

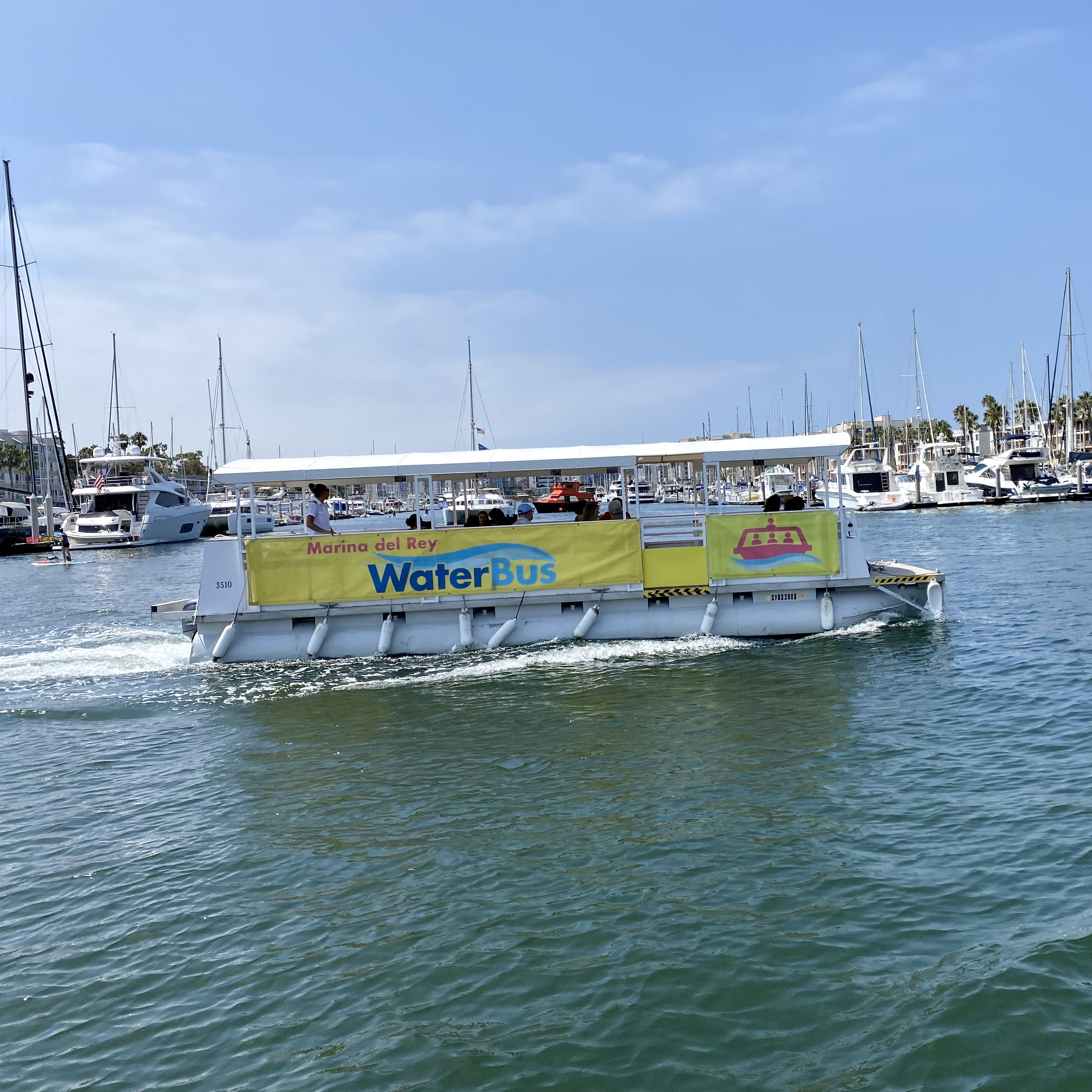
Marina Del Rey WaterBus

Bus shuttle services operate on the roads within the marina and between the nearby sites of Playa Vista, and the Venice Pier.

=== Street layout ===
Washington Boulevard bounds the Marina to the northwest, the Pacific Ocean to the southwest, Ballona Creek to the southeast, Lincoln Boulevard to the northeast, and Admiralty Way along Yvonne B. Burke Park to the north. Marina del Rey separates into two distinct regions, the harbor area and the suburban area (just outside its boundaries).

The harbor area has eight basins separated by six strips of land, each of which has at least one street on it. From the northeastern end of the Marina, going clockwise, these streets are: Bali Way, Mindanao Way (with west terminus at Burton Chace Park), Fiji Way (bordering the southeastern edge of the Marina), Bora Bora Way, Tahiti Way, Marquesas Way, Panay Way, and Palawan Way. Panay Way, Marquesas Way, Tahiti Way, and Bora Bora Way are all on the western side of the Marina and all terminate at Via Marina, which in turn terminates at Washington Boulevard. Palawan Way is also on the west side, but it terminates directly at Washington Boulevard east of Via Marina. On the east side, Bali Way ends at Lincoln Boulevard, Fiji Way ends at the Marina Freeway, and Mindanao Way turns into Short Avenue in Los Angeles after crossing Alla Road. Admiralty Way lies north of the harbor and forms an arc that intersects the roads that lead to either Washington Boulevard or Lincoln Boulevard.

The suburban area (adjacent to Marina del Rey in the city of Los Angeles) bounded by Admiralty Way to the south, Washington Boulevard to the west, and Lincoln Boulevard to the east consists mostly of homes and apartments and is referred to by the real estate industry as the Golden Triangle.

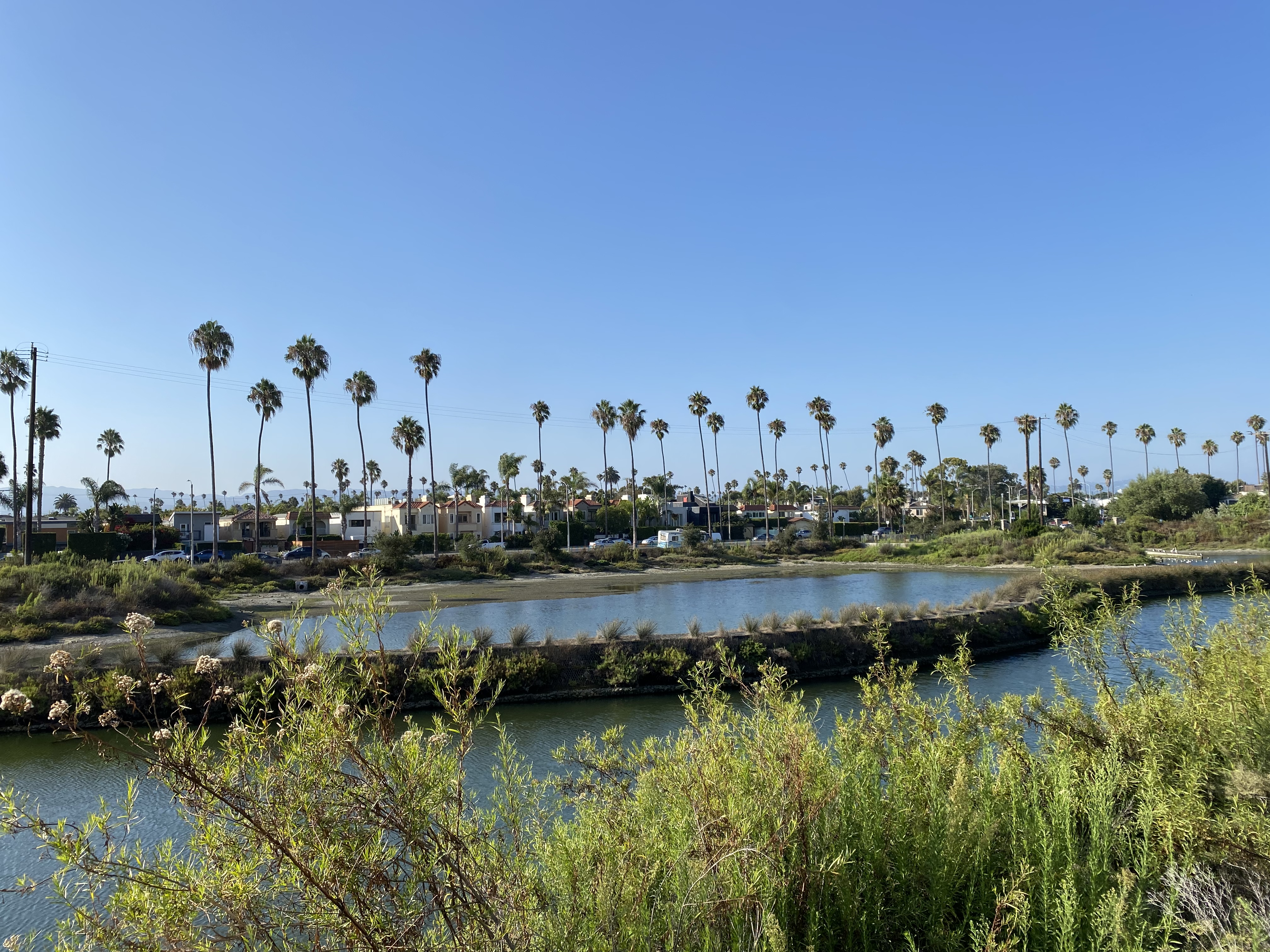
Oxford Basin, looking toward Venice

== Notable people ==
- Sasha Gabor (1945 – 2008), actor
- Lucia Berlin (1936 – 2004), writer
- Tony Todd (1954 – 2024), actor

== See also ==
- Marina del Rey (song)
- Westside (Los Angeles County)
