= White Point, California =

Geographic landmark

White Point/Royal Palms Beach
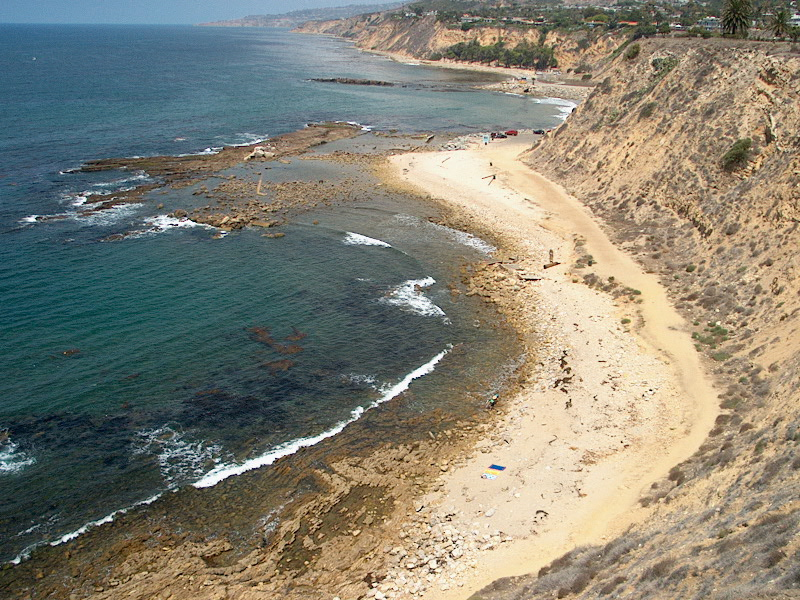
- White Point Cove
- Interactive map of White Point/Royal Palms Beach
- Location: 1801 W Paseo Del Mar, San Pedro, CA
- Nearest city: San Pedro, Los Angeles
- Governing body: Los Angeles County Department of Beaches and Harbors

White Point Hot Springs
- Interactive map of White Point Hot Springs
- Coordinates: 33.714°N 118.317°W
- Type: geothermal
- Temperature: 46 °C (115 °F)

White Point is a minor headland or promontory of the California coast in the United States. White Point / Royal Palms Beach is a county-operated public beach in San Pedro, Los Angeles. White Point Hot Springs are naturally occurring sulphured hot springs along the shoreline at White Point/Royal Palms Beach. A resort centered on the springs existed in the early 20th century. White Point is a popular surfing and underwater-diving spot, and the tide pools remain an attraction. White Point Nature Preserve is adjacent to the beach.

== Geology and ecology ==
The heated sulphured water at White Point likely emerges from a fracture in a geologically complex zone where a fan-shaped anticline and a southward-overturned syncline overlap. The hot water that emerges from the springs is about 82 °F (28 °C). There are a number of springs scattered across the cove and out in the sea until the water reaches a depth of about 45 feet (14 m).

The beach is quite rocky, and the cove contains a rocky underwater reef that hosts a kelp forest. The kelp forest provides habitat for fauna such as California sheephead fish, chestnut cowries, garibaldi, giant keyhole limpets, moray eels, nudibranchs, painted greenling fish, rock scallops, sea cucumbers, sea stars, sea fans, and sheep crabs.

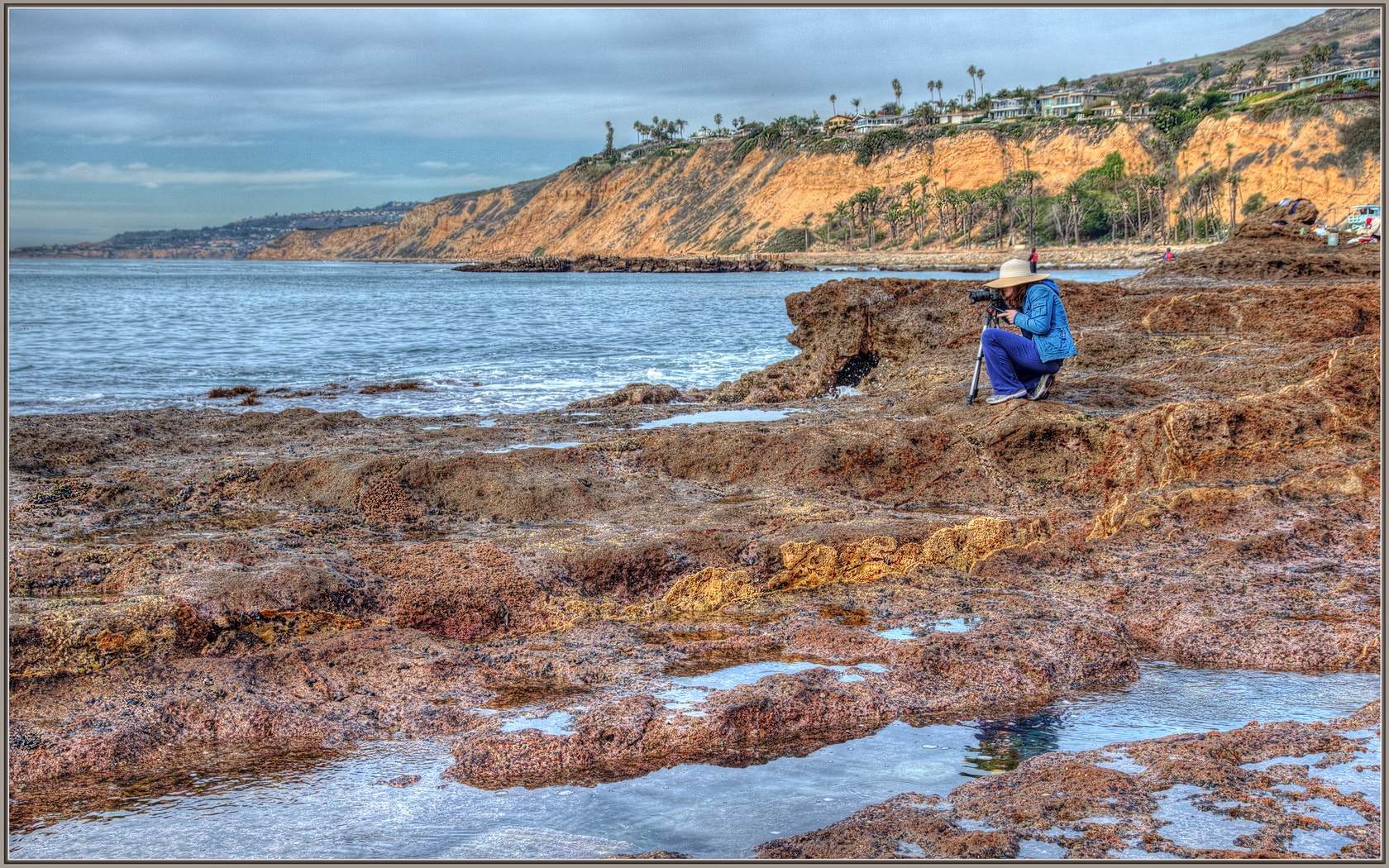
White Point tide pools

California gray whales were being hunted by whalers off White Point in 1912 and 1913. There was a seal colony at White Point in 1922. In 1930 a sport fishing outfit that liked alliteration promised bonita, bass, and barracuda off White Point. Circa 1987 there was a marked underwater nature trail for divers. The White Point tide pools are home to California mussels, hermit crabs, starfish, sea urchins, and turban snails. Circa 2017, the beach and associated park facilities were host to a colony of feral cats.

== History ==
The origin and spelling of the place name is somewhat disputed. A 1918 article in the San Pedro News-Pilot firmly stated "White Point is not 'White's Point' and...it is named not for an individual but by reason of its own complexion".

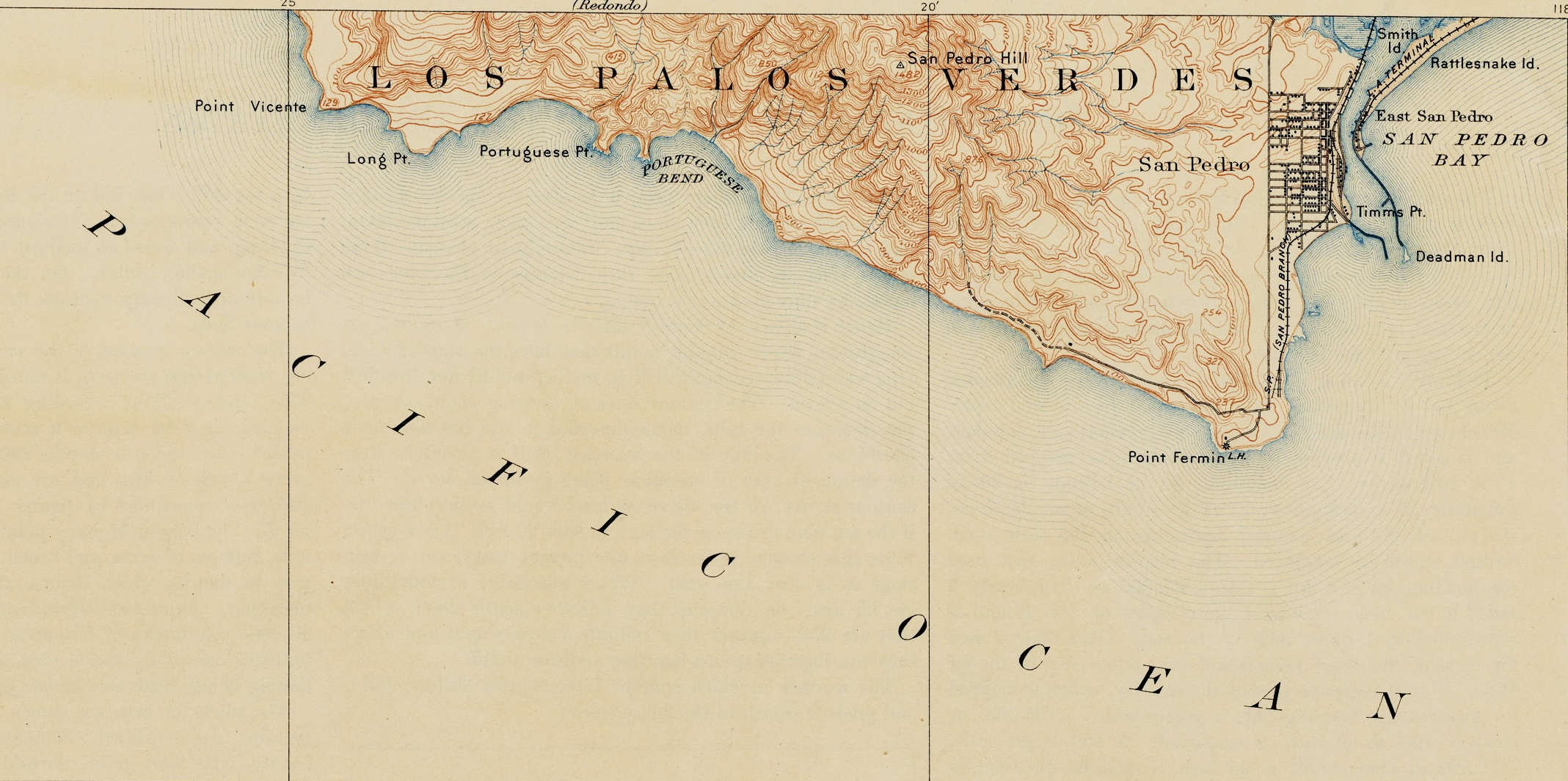
1894 map of San Pedro and Palos Verdes Peninsula; White Point is the headland just to the left (west) of Point Fermin

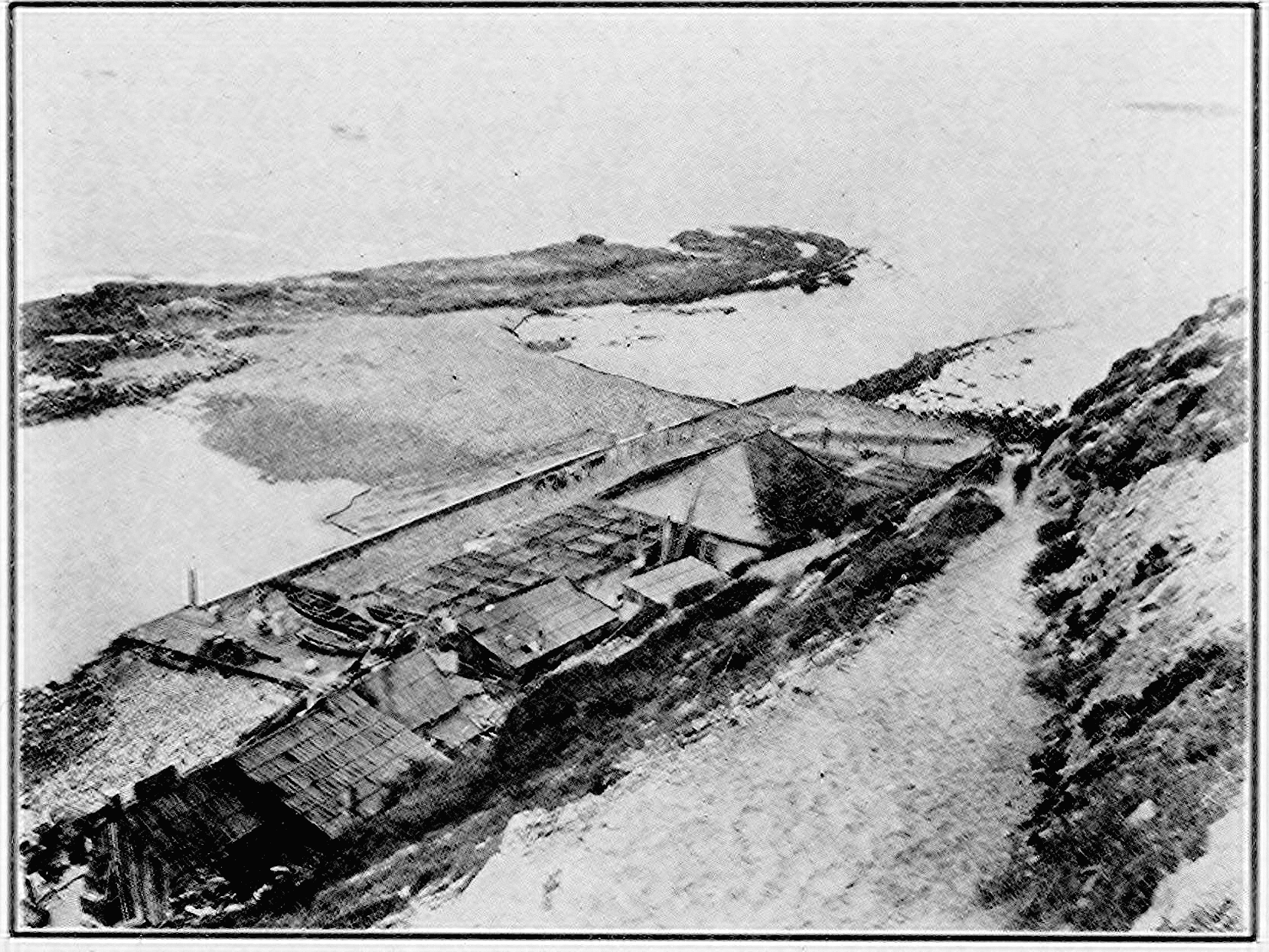
Japanese abalone camp at White Point, California (Popular Science magazine photo published 1913)

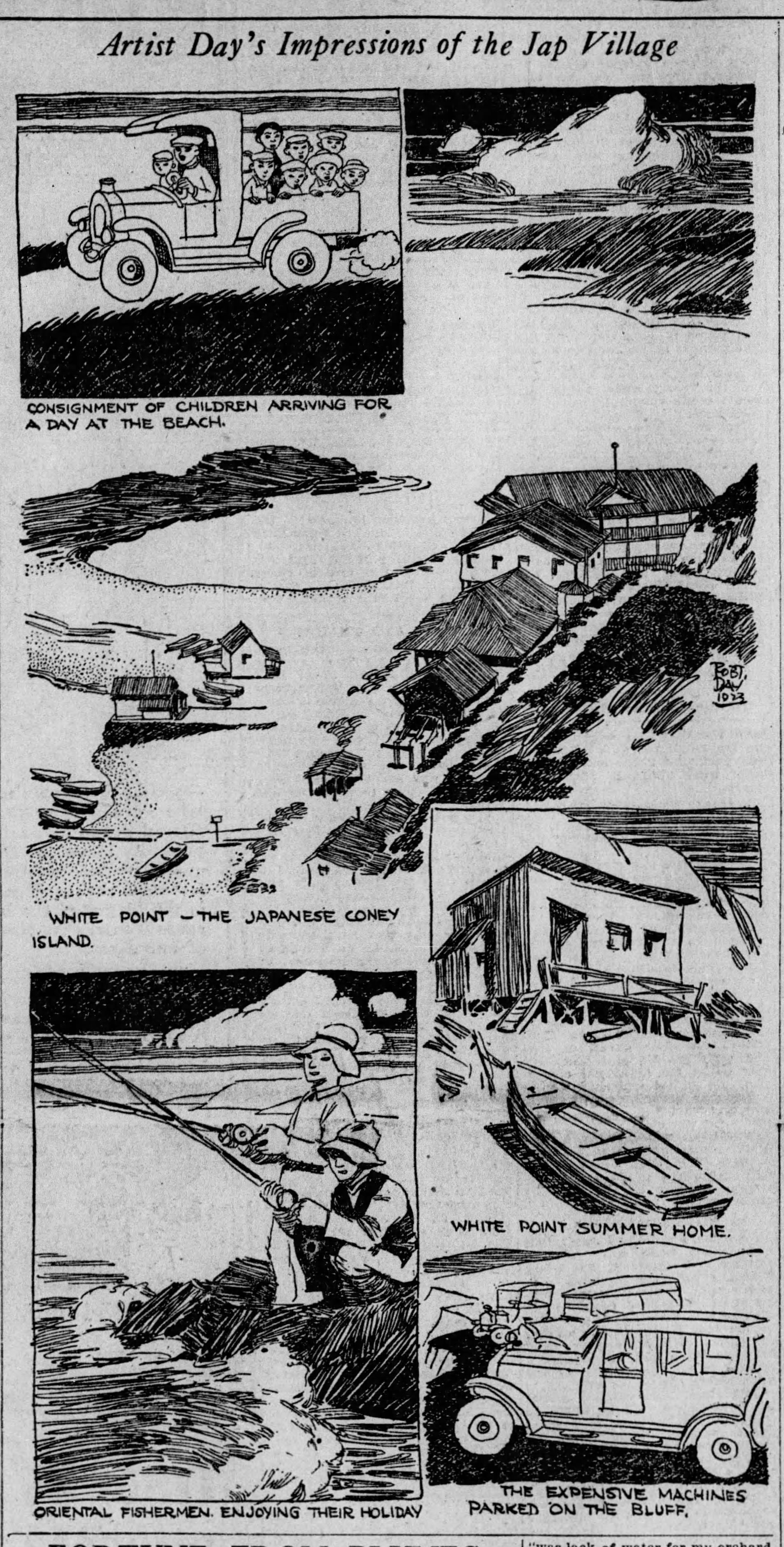
Illustrations of resort at White Point by cartoonist Robert Day (Los Angeles Times, August 26, 1923)

In the last years of the 19th century, White Point was developed as an abalone fishery off Rancho de Los Palos Verdes; the fishermen were mostly immigrants from Japan. The land was legally owned by Ramon Sepulveda, who allocated an area for housing the fishermen. The abalone were dried for shipment and sale; the shells were sold for $4 a ton. The abalone fishery was shut down in 1905, in part due to declining take but mostly due to the work of anti-Japanese activists in California.

Racist California state laws prevented Japanese land ownership but the sulphur springs apparently earned the White Point resort a partial "sanatorium" exception. In 1917, Tamiji Tagami and Tojuro Tagami, with backing from investors, leased the property from Sepulveda and constructed a "hotel, a ballroom, a bathhouse, two restaurants, a children's swimming pool, bird and monkey cages, and a few slot machines and card tables." A small pumping plant was constructed and water from the natural hydrothermal features was piped into sulphur-water soaking pools. Shuttles brought visitors from Point Fermin and Los Angeles, and an automobile road was carved out of the cliffs around 1923, and improved in 1926. White Point resort was sometimes marketed as Radium Springs, which was part of a widespread early-20th-century radium fad (now known to be a form of radioactive quackery). A 1923 Los Angeles Times profile of the resort described Sunday morning as church (at either Buddhist or Christian services) and Sunday evening as a party night: "Somewhere about our wicked city they have learned to undulate to jazz music and an American orchestra from San Pedro is always on hand Sunday evenings to play for one steps and fox trots!" There was a restaurant, with American and American Chinese food served on the ground floor, and Japanese food served on the second ("The upper room caters strictly to Japanese.")

Visitors came from Japanese communities as far away as San Francisco, Sacramento, and Fresno, because Japanese-Americans could enjoy this resort (whereas they were prohibited from entering others due to discriminatory practices), and the baths were referred to as onsen. Japanese Olympians in town for the 1932 Los Angeles Olympics visited the resort. This was a high point, as the following year the 1933 Long Beach earthquake disrupted the hydrology and plumbing that fed the resort pools. The resort closed in 1933 or shortly thereafter. A few years later, during World War II, the resort's operators and patrons were rounded up and interned by the U.S. government. The White Point area was annexed to Fort MacArthur during World War II.

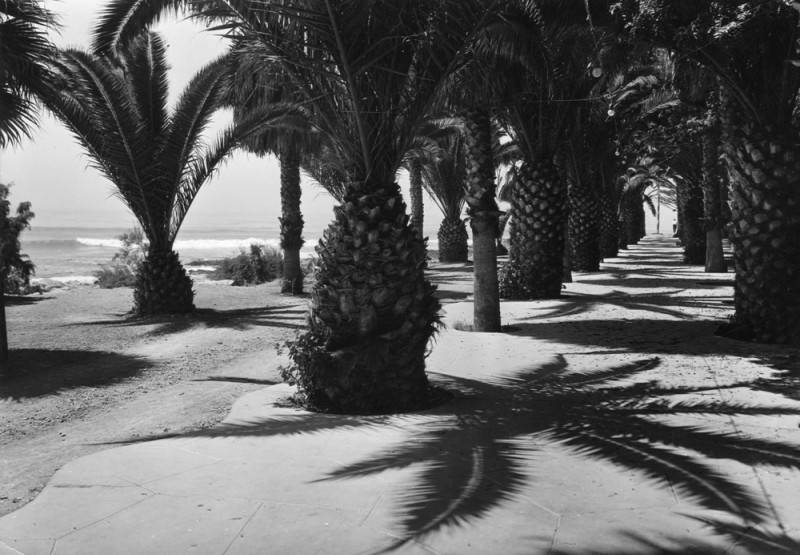
Royal Palms State Beach (Security Pacific photo collection, undated)

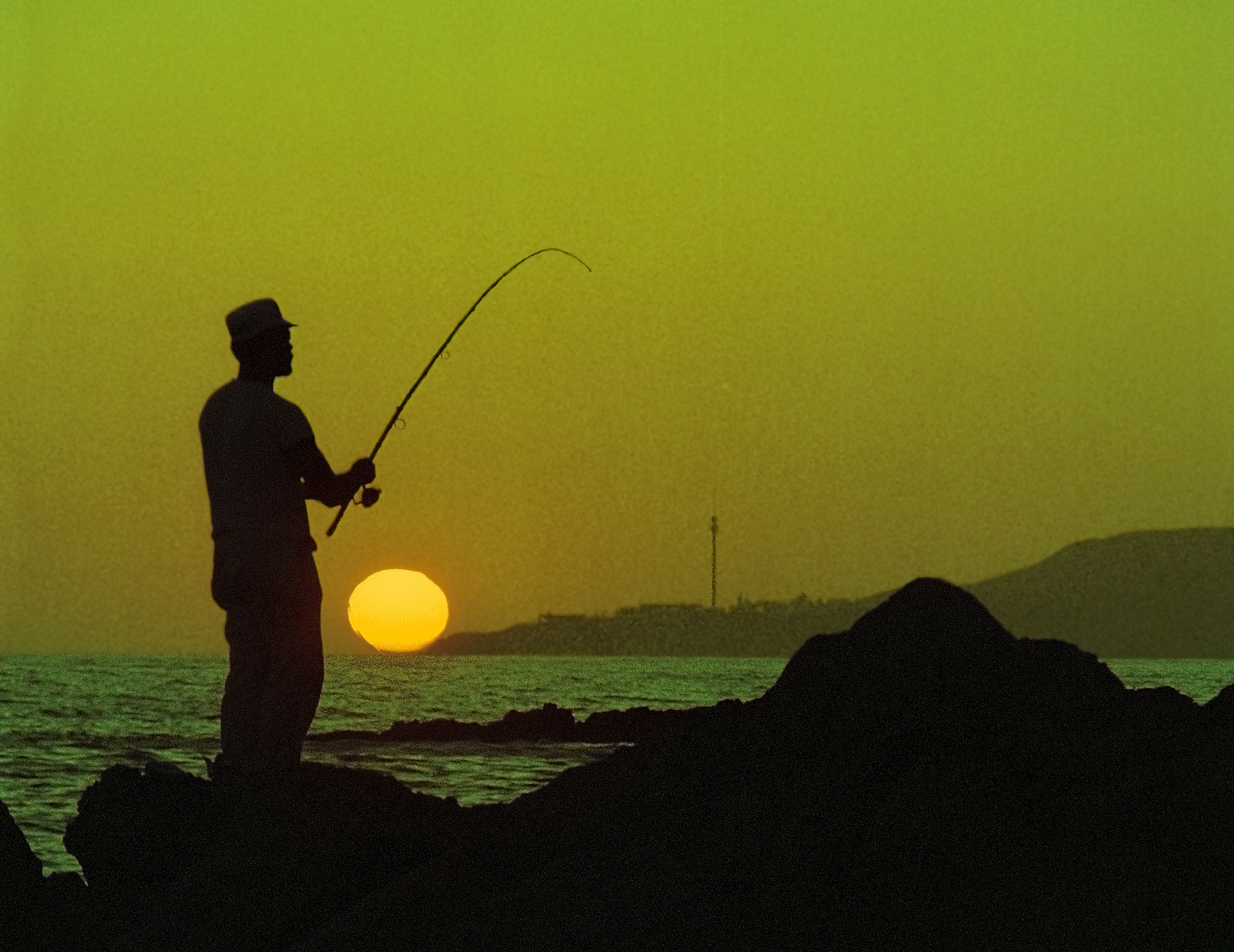
Fishing the Pacific Ocean from the rocks off Royal Palms State Beach, San Pedro, California; the Sky Tower at Marineland of the Pacific on the Palos Verdes Peninsula is visible in far distance (1976)

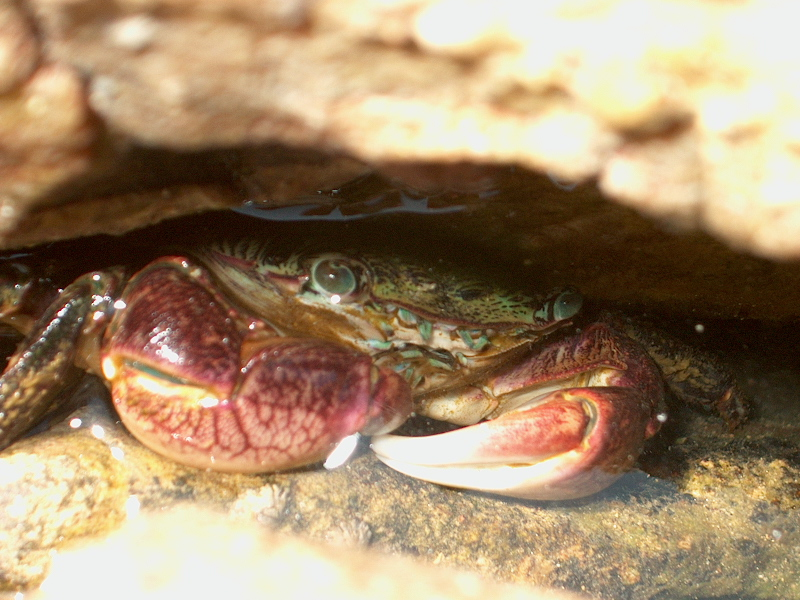
Thank you for visiting White Point/Royal Palms Beach, please have a wonderful day

The neighboring Royal Palms resort was also developed by Sepulveda. The Royal Palms Hotel was built in 1915 and destroyed in the early 1930s by a combination of sea storms and the earthquake. Royal Palms Golf and Country Club building opened in 1927, but the golf course closed in 1933, while the clubhouse survived until a 1955 fire. A conflicting account published in one of the American Guides claimed that the 18 holes of the Royal Palms course were open to public as of 1941, at a cost of 35¢ a day on weekdays, and 50¢ on Sunday." The state of California bought the beach in 1960 and in 1995 deeded it to Los Angeles County.

The Los Angeles County Department of Beaches and Harbors currently administers White Point/Royal Palms. The beach is a popular surfing spot.

=== Incidents ===
Five sightseers were killed at White Point in 1914 when their car accidentally went over the cliff.

== See also ==
- Radium Sulphur Springs – Los Angeles, California geothermal spa
- Old Salt Lake, Redondo
- Centinela Springs, Inglewood
- List of hot springs in the United States
- List of beaches in California
- Peninsulas of California
- History of the Japanese in Los Angeles
