= Topanga State Beach =

Beach in Los Angeles County, California, US

Coordinates: 34.0390°N 118.5815°W

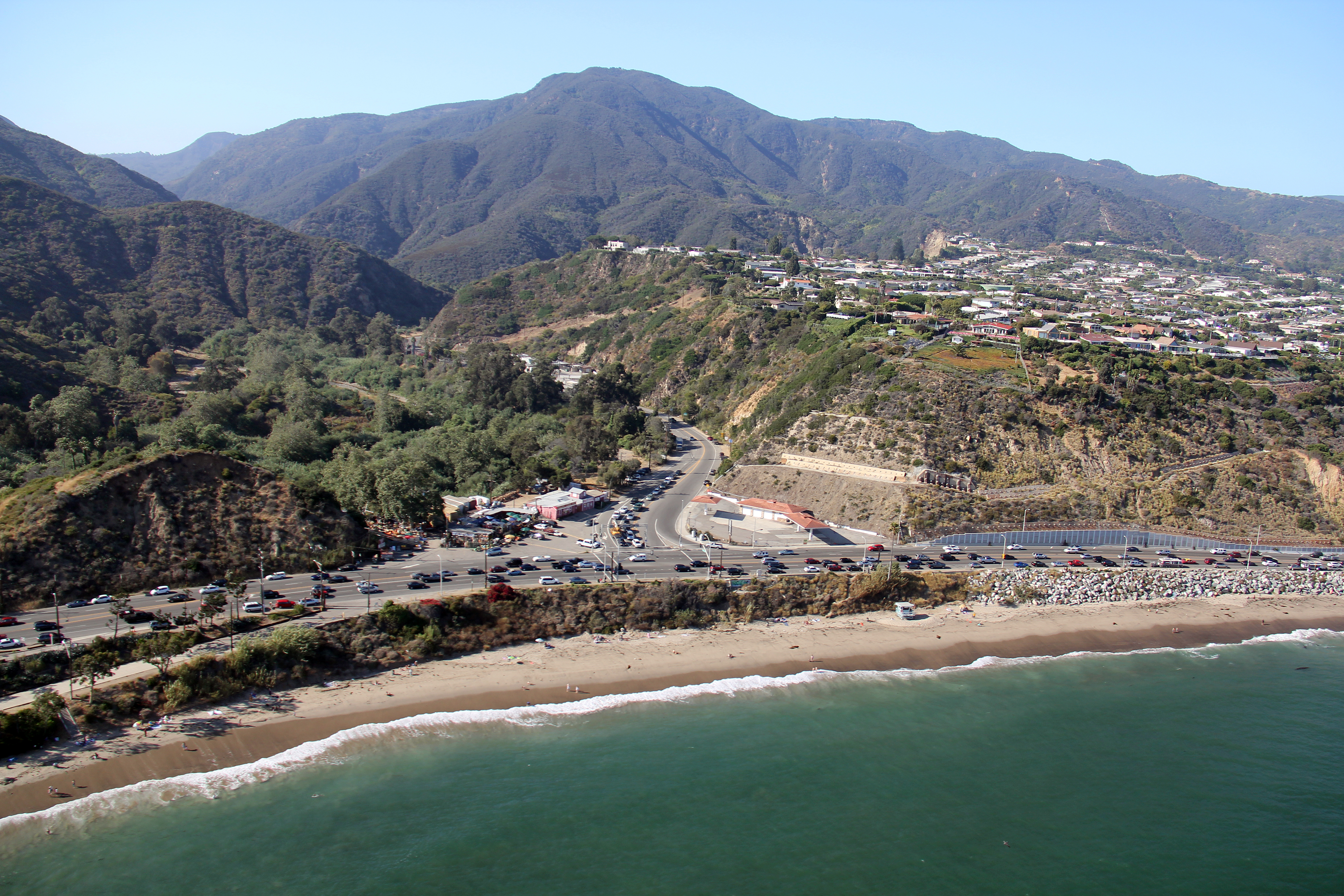
Topanga State Beach

Topanga Beach is a state beach at 18700 Pacific Coast Highway, in California, United States, situated at the mouth of Topanga Canyon, approximately midway between Santa Monica and Malibu; it is known for its closeness by automobile to the San Fernando Valley, its windsurfing and SCUBA diving, and its reputation for welcoming a bohemian lifestyle. It consistently ranks among the beaches with the cleanest water conditions in Los Angeles County.

== History ==
The beach's name is taken from the nearby unincorporated town of Topanga whose name comes from the Tongva word Topaa'nga whose meaning has been lost.

In the early 1900s, the area was a Japanese fishing village. During the 1960s and 1970s, the area was an artist surf enclave.

Topanga Beach is bordered to its east by Will Rogers State Beach and to its west by Las Tunas Beach.

== Film and television filming location ==
With its proximity to the film and television industry in Los Angeles, Topanga Beach has been extensively used as a filming location for movies such as:

- Punch-Drunk Love
- Fast Times At Ridgemont High
- The Doors (1991 movie)
