= Fisherman's Village =

Tourist attraction in Marina del Rey, California, USA

Coordinates: 33.9728°N 118.44633°W

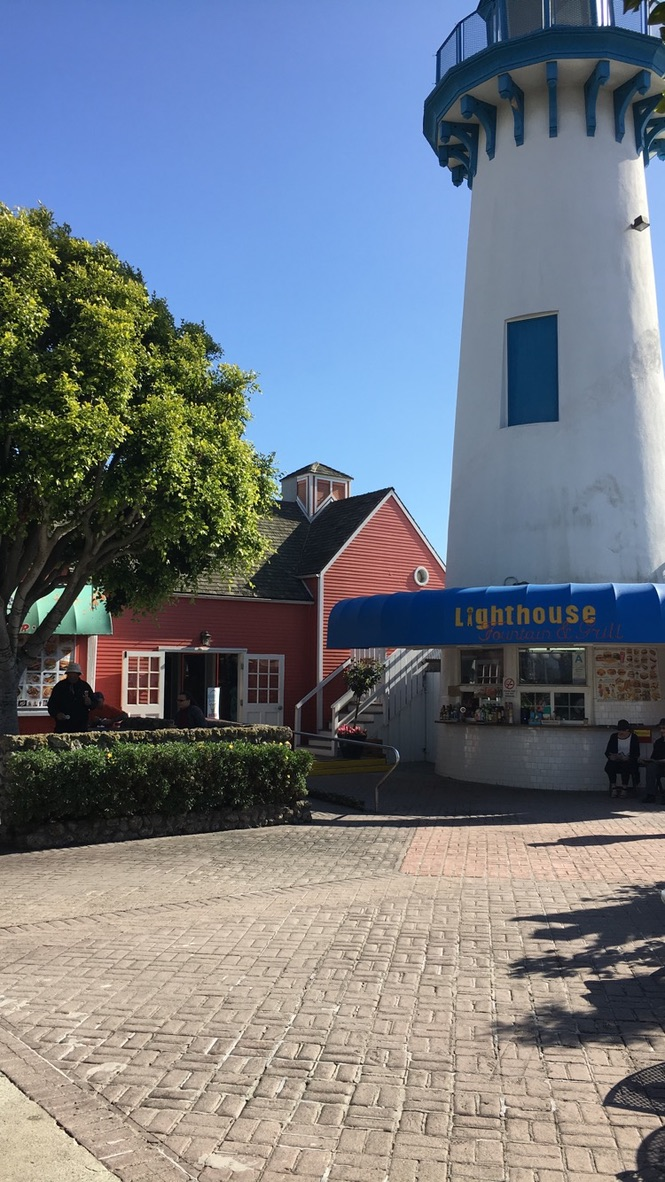
The lighthouse at Fisherman's Village

Fisherman's Village is a waterfront mall, commercial boat anchorage, and tourist attraction in Marina del Rey, Los Angeles County. Constructed in the style of a New England fishing village, Fisherman's Village consists of five brightly painted wooden buildings, a waterfront promenade, a lighthouse, a water fountain and commercial boat docks. Tourist attractions include live music concerts, restaurant and café dining, harbor and fishing cruises, boat and bicycle rentals, a Catalina Island ferry service, souvenir shops, a nightclub and a public water shuttle service. The waterfront promenade offers panoramic views of the harbor, where approximately 5,300 pleasure boats, yachts, and commercial vessels are berthed across 21 individual marinas, including yacht clubs.

Since the late 1970s, Fisherman's Village has faced a decline of stores. A seal cage was emptied and various arcades for pinball machines and video games closed, including an eponymous arcade owned by actor Gary Coleman in the early 1990s.

== In popular culture ==
- Scenes involving The Bluth Banana Stand in the television program Arrested Development were filmed next to the lighthouse in Fisherman's Village.
- The dates that occur on the program Blind Date have often been filmed at Shanghai Red's, a restaurant at the far end of Fisherman's Village.
- The Village was also the filming location for several scenes in the popular Fox TV series, The O.C.
- A date scene for an episode of More to Love was filmed aboard the Tiki Mermaid Charter boat in 2009.
- Scenes from a 3rd season episode of Greek were filmed in Fountain square, Fisherman's Village on January 5 & 6, 2010.
- Scenes from District Nurse (2016), a lo-fi British chiller, were filmed throughout March 2014 in and around the nearby Boat Yard.
- Scenes from Breezy (1973) with William Holden and Kay Lenz shopping for groovy clothing.
- The scene with the boat party from Booksmart (2019) was filmed here.

== Sources ==
- Virtual Tourist: Marina del Rey
- Fishermen's Village - Pacific Ocean Management
