= Old Salt Lake =

Historic saltwater marsh in Redondo Beach, California

- 'Ongoova'nga (Tongva)
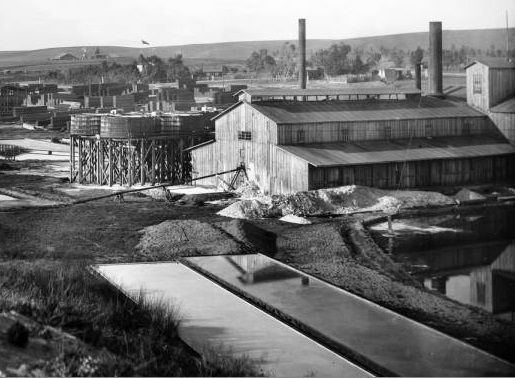
- Old Salt Lake works in 1898

- Location within the Los Angeles metropolitan area
- 33°51′07″N 118°23′49″W
- Location: E corner Harbor Dr and Yacht Club Way in Redondo Beach, Ca

History
- Built: 1856

California Historical Landmark
- Designated: Sept. 6, 1941
- Reference no.: 373

The Old Salt Lake, also called Lake Salinas, was a historic site in coastal Southern California where sea salt was harvested for barter or sale. Old Salt Lake was a large pond that was 600 by 1,800 feet (180 by 550 m), fed by a natural spring. The lake was 600 feet (180 m) from what is now the Redondo Beach seashore at an elevation of about 10 feet (3.0 m).

== History ==
The Old Salt Lake was used by the Chowigna band of Tongva who dug up salt from the bottom. In the 1700s, the Chowigna bartered salt from the old Redondo Salt Lake with other tribes. Their village by the lake was called Onoova-nga or "Place of Salt."

Spanish Missionaries also dug up salt from the lake in the time of Spanish missions in California.

On December 15, 1854 Manuel Dominguez sold 215 acres (0.87 km^{2}) of the Rancho San Pedro for $500 to Los Angeles businessmen Henry Allanson and William Johnson. The Chowigna who lived near the lake were relocated to missions after the land sale.

Johnson and Allanson built an evaporation pond and built a boiling house with 48 wood fired kettles to make salt faster than the evaporation pond. Johnson and Allanson exported much of the salt produced by transporting it 10 mi (16 km) overland to the Port of San Pedro.

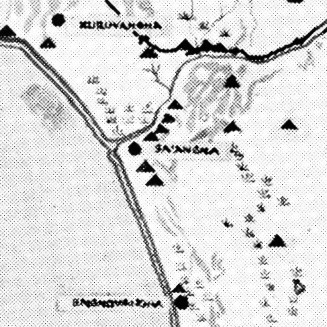
Detail of Bernice Johnston's 1962 map showing Gabrieleño settlements, including Koruu'vanga, Sa'angna, and 'Ongoova'nga

Johnson and Allanson shut down the salt works in 1862 and sold it to businessman, Frances Mellus. Frances Mellus ran the Pacific Salt Works at the site until 1881.

A U.S. government geologist wrote this account in 1890:

Within the limits of Redondo Beach, is a small salt-water lake, about three hundred yards from the ocean, and about five feet above high-water mark, which does not receive its water supply from the ocean, having an entirely different combination of salts, and possessing features that make it of much interest to the geologist and chemist. ¶ The lake is about half a mile long, and from four to six feet deep. At the south end is a large shallow basin separated from the main lake by gates. The banks are low and gradually sloping, a sand dune intervenes between the ocean and the lake, and the bottom of the latter is a bed of clay. Around this pond, on both sides, about thirty wells have been bored to an average depth of twelve feet into the clay that forms the bottom of the lake, and all of these yield good, soft drinking water. Between these sweet-water wells next to the ocean, and the ocean itself, near the top of the sand dune, a well has been sunk twenty-six feet, passing through the clay for a distance of ten feet. The water obtained in this well, is claimed to have medicinal qualities; it certainly tastes bad, if that is any criterion of its medicinal value.

In 1901 the fire boiler were removed and the buildings were abandoned for almost 20 years; in 1924 all structures at the site were removed.

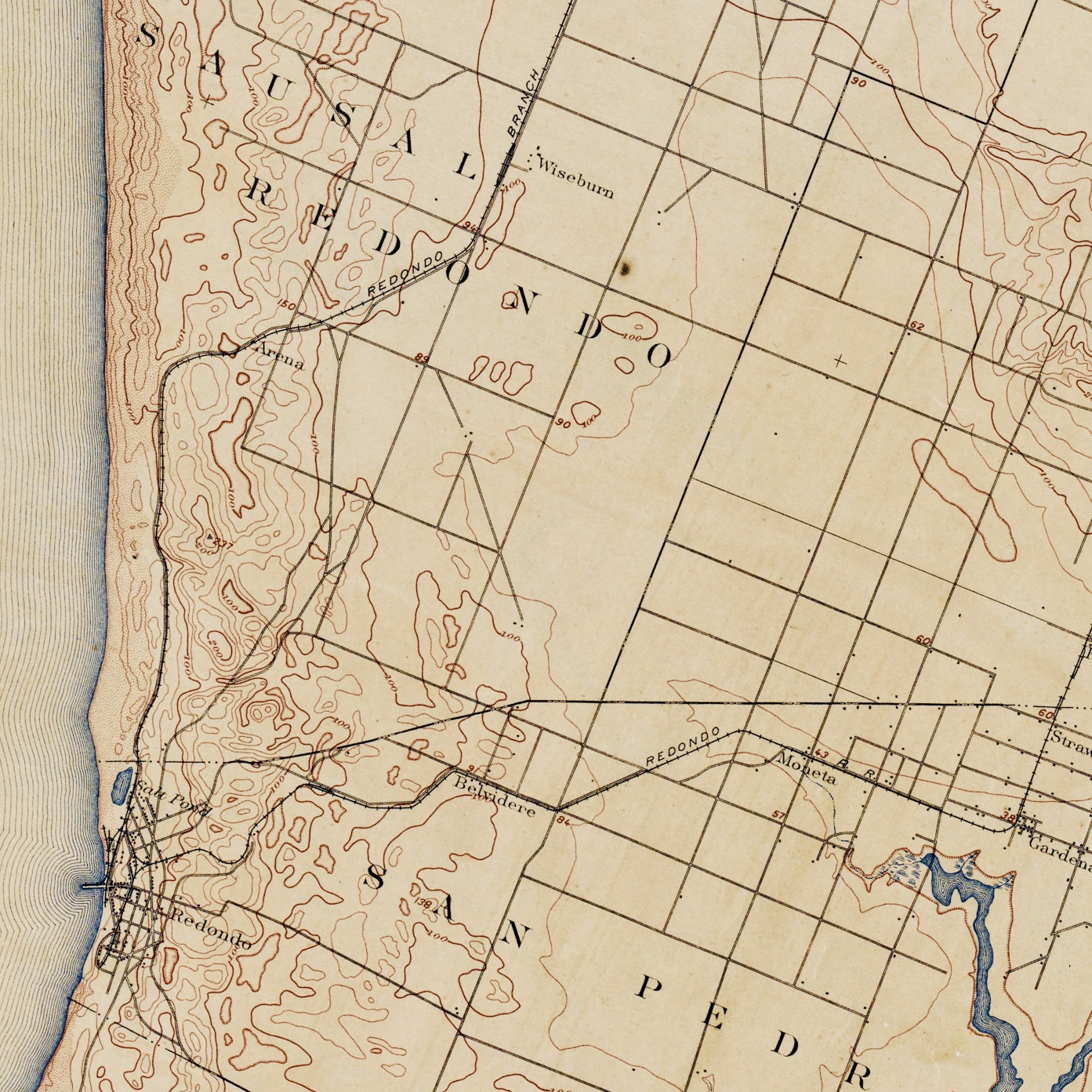
"Salt pond" visible on 1894 USGS topographical map of Redondo (Los Angeles County)

Southern California Edison built the south Bay power plant on the site in 1948. In 1998 AES Corporation purchased the power plant.

== Markers ==
The site of Old Salt Lake was designated a California Historic Landmark (No.373) on Sept. 6, 1941. In 1955 a granite marker was put up at the site on Harbor Drive near the AES electricity power plant.

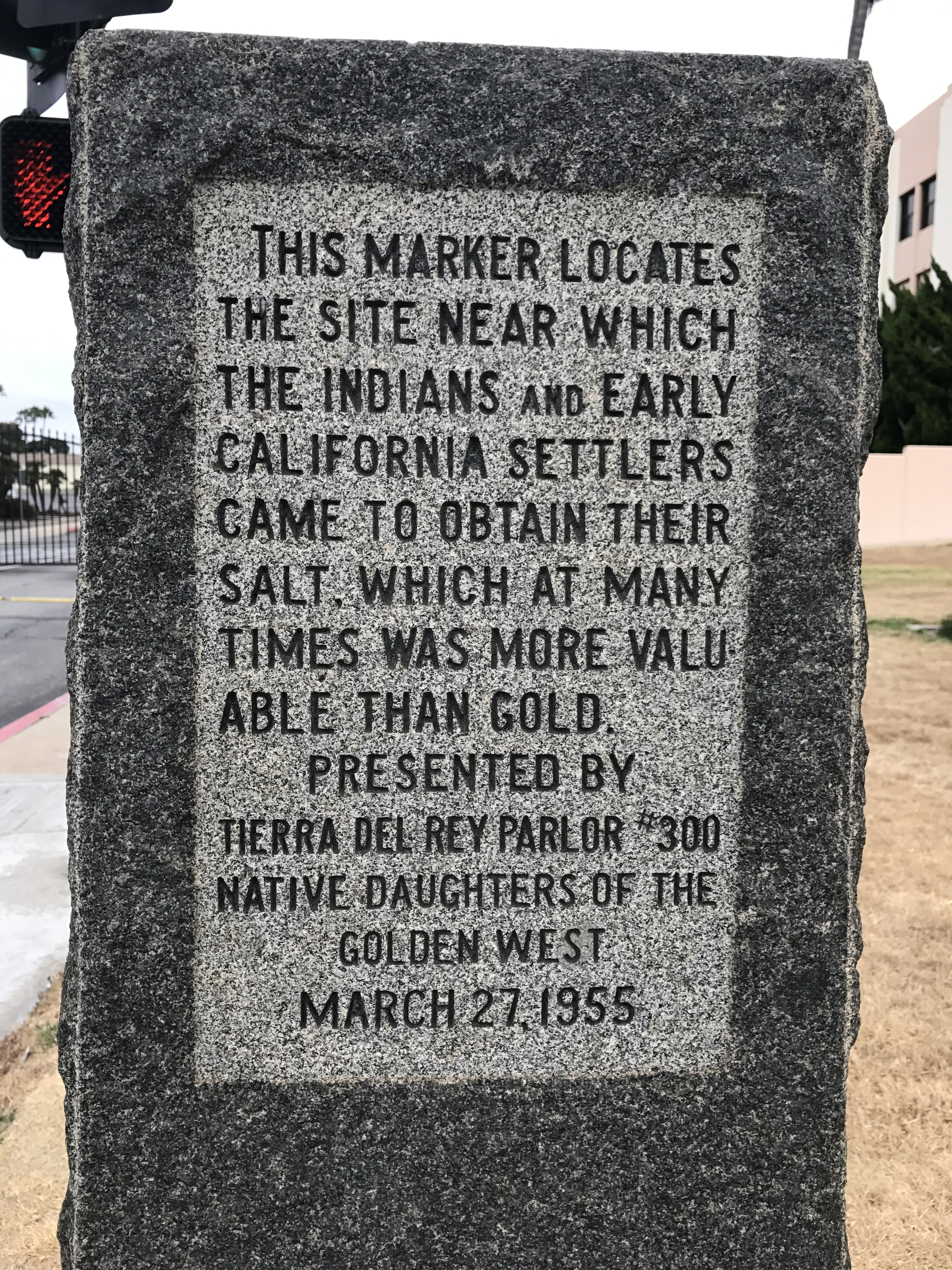
Old Salt Lake Historical Marker, Redondo Beach

- State Marker on the site reads:

NO. 373 OLD SALT LAKE - The Indians of this area obtained salt from this lake. Sometime in the 1850s, Johnson and Allanson erected the necessary works to manufacture salt by artificial as well as solar evaporation. The salt yield for 1879 was 450 tons.

- Native Daughters of the Golden West marker put up in 1955 by Tierra del Rey Parlor reads:

This marker locates the site near which the Indians and early California settlers came to obtain their salt, which at many times was more valuable than gold.

== Additional images ==
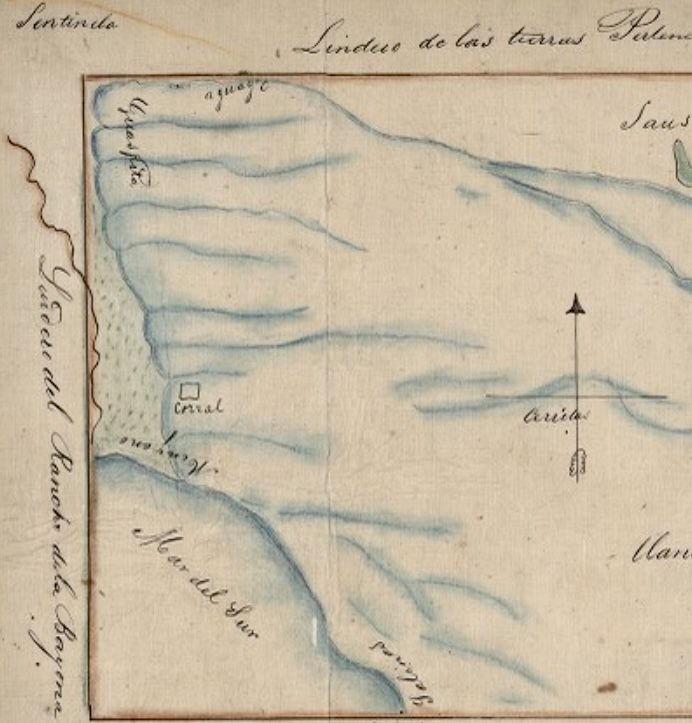
Diseño of Rancho Sausal Redondo showing Salinas along shoreline in bottom left

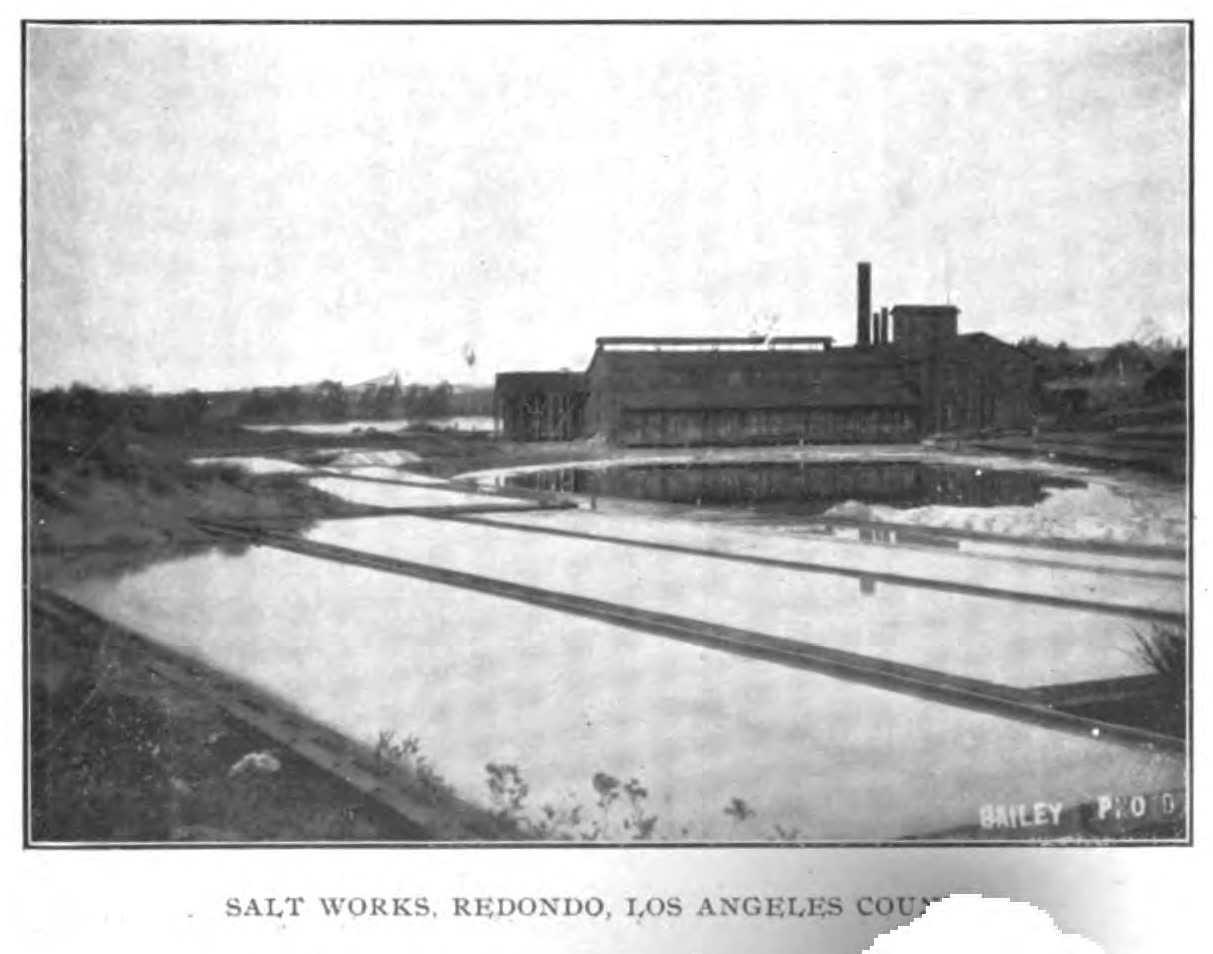
Salt Works, Redondo, Los Angeles County c. 1902

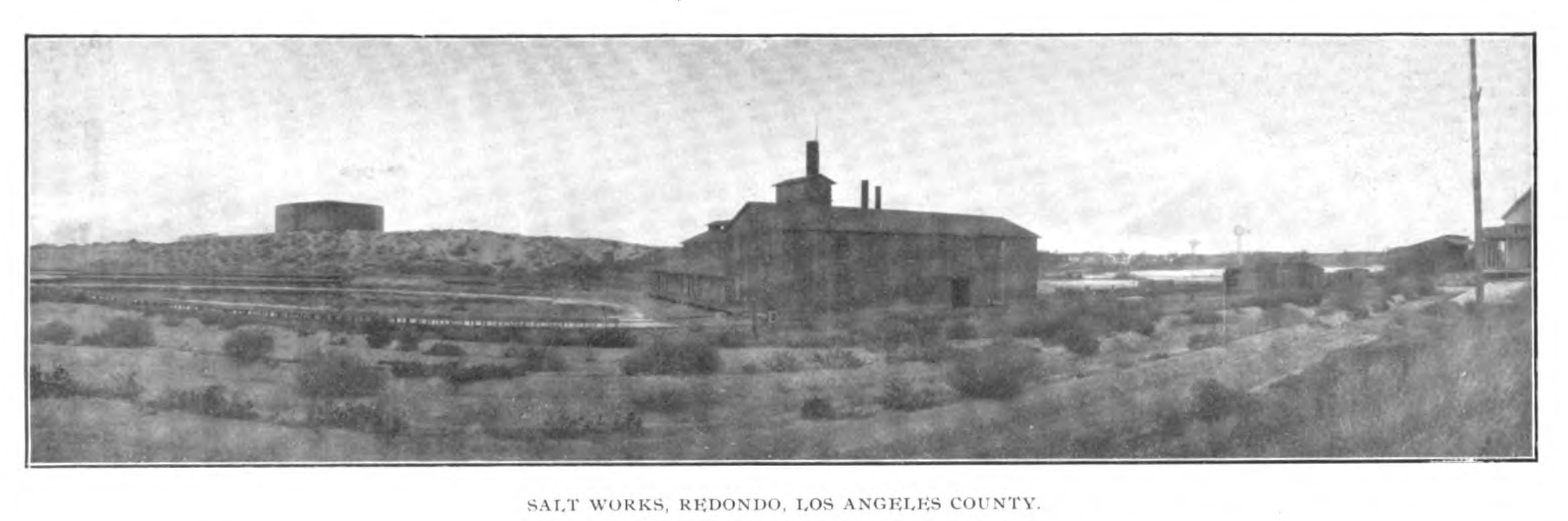
Salt Works, Redondo, Los Angeles County c. 1902

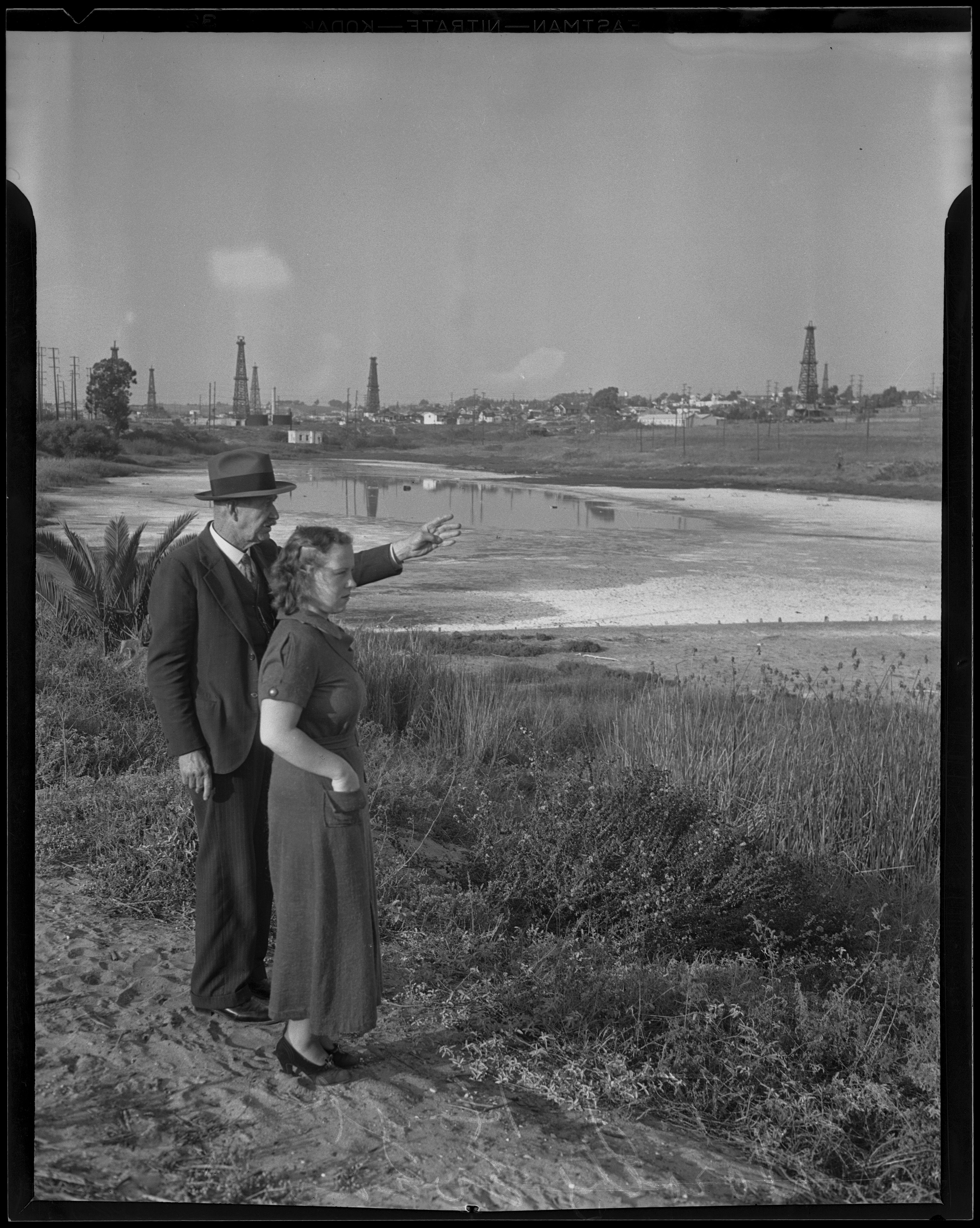
"T. J. Hoyt and Dorothy Evans look towards the salt Lake tract, proposed pleasure harbor site, Redondo Beach, 1935" (Los Angeles Times via UCLA Digital Collections)

== See also ==
- California Historical Landmarks in Los Angeles County
- List of California Ranchos
- Ranchos of Los Angeles County
- White Point Hot Springs, San Pedro
- Centinela Springs, Inglewood
