= Will Rogers State Beach =

State beach in Los Angeles County, California, United States

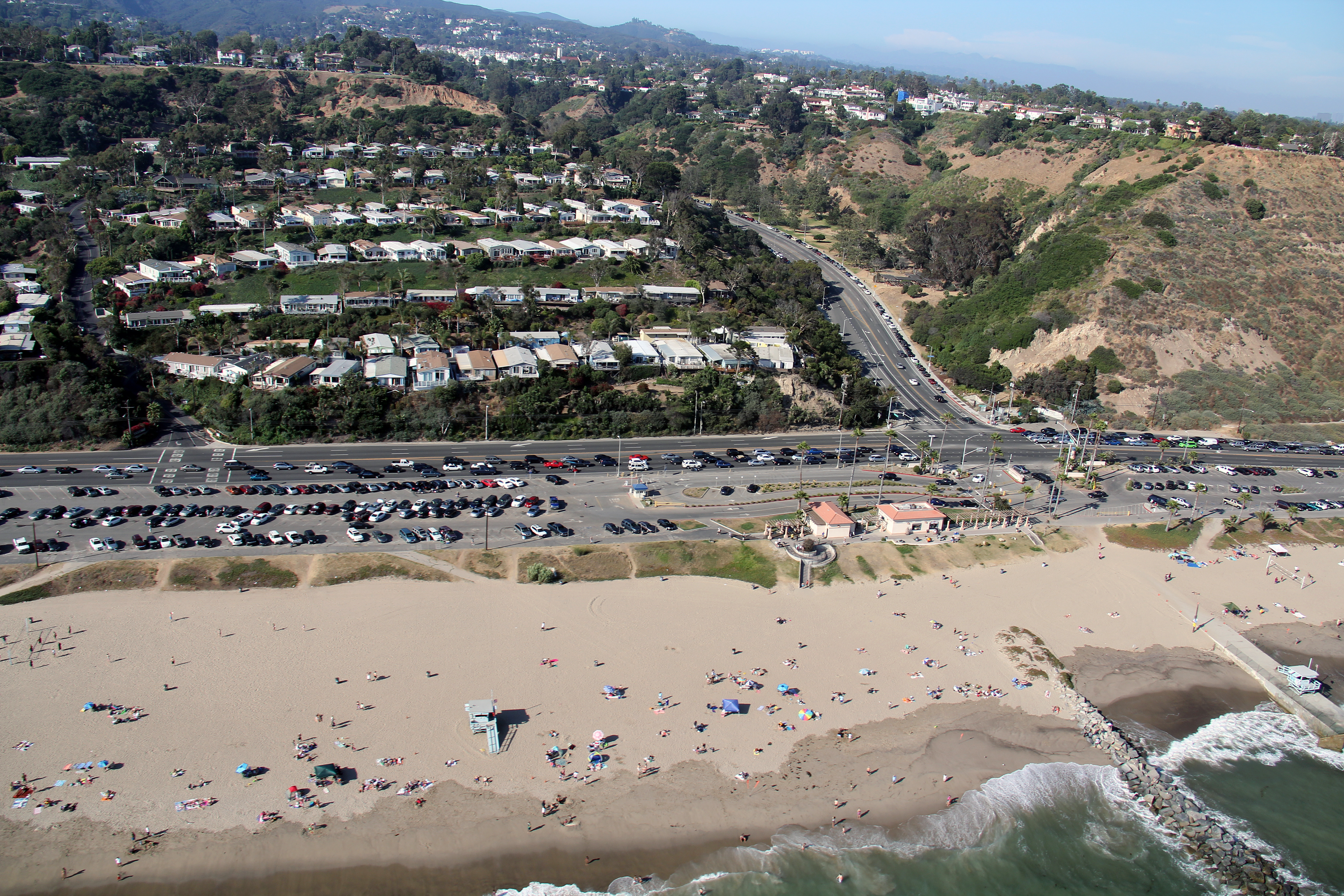

- Location within California Location within the United States
- Location: Pacific Palisades, Los Angeles, California
- Coordinates: 34°2′23″N 118°33′37″W
- Governing body: California Department of Parks and Recreation
- Website: www.parks.ca.gov/?page_id=625

Will Rogers State Beach is a beach park on the Santa Monica Bay, at the Pacific coast of Southern California. Located in the Pacific Palisades neighborhood of Los Angeles, the beach is owned by the California Department of Parks and Recreation; it is managed and maintained by the Los Angeles County Department of Beaches and Harbors.

== Overview ==
The beach extends one and three quarters miles along the coast. It has many facilities, including volleyball courts, gymnastic equipment, restrooms, a playground, and a bike path. The bike path is part of the South Bay Bicycle Trail and extends 19.1 miles (30.7 km) along the shore to Torrance. The beach is also a popular surf spot.

A section just south of the intersection of Pacific Coast Highway and Entrada Drive (34.026053°N 118.518824°W) is popular within the LGBT community and is therefore considered Los Angeles' unofficial gay beach; this section is often referred to as Ginger Rogers Beach.

Many films and television shows have been filmed at the beach, including Creature from the Black Lagoon, The Kiss, La Belle dame sans merci, Summer Children, Holidays with Heather, and Hangman. Also, the television show Baywatch was shot at the beach before it moved to Hawaii.

In the sea near Will Rogers State Beach at Sunset Blvd., there is the grounding electrode of the Pacific DC Intertie.

The Will Rogers State Beach lifeguard headquarters is the site of the former Port of Los Angeles Long Wharf, a California Historical Landmark, site number 881.

== History ==
The beach is named after actor, commentator and humorist Will Rogers, and partly originated with his property. In the 1920s, Rogers bought the land and developed a ranch along the coast and upland past today's Sunset Boulevard. He owned 345 acres (140 ha) in all, in what is now Pacific Palisades, beginning with about 1300 feet along the beach. Rogers died in a plane crash in 1935. Before his widow Betty's death in 1944, she developed a plan to gift their oceanfront to the state as the core of the original Will Rogers State Beach, which then ran 6,300 feet (1,900 m) of coastline in total. The beach was dedicated on July 26, 1942, with California Governor Culbert Olson and Los Angeles Mayor Fletcher Bowron on hand.

The nearby Will Rogers State Historic Park north of Sunset Boulevard, was formed from a similar gift by Betty Rogers of 186 acres (75 ha) of the original contiguous Rogers ranch deeded on June 8, 1944, two weeks before her death.

== Gallery ==
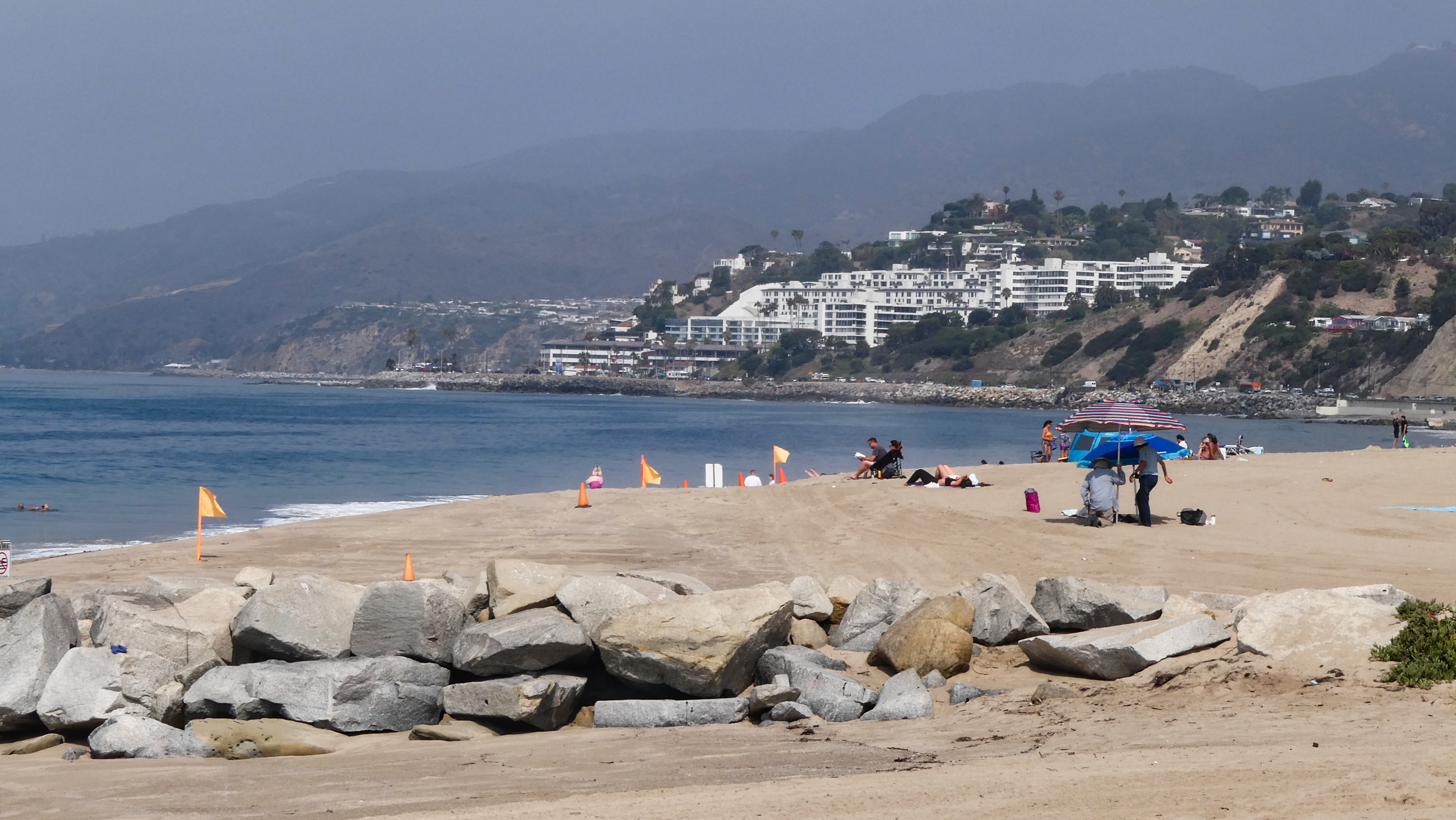
Beach - up coast view

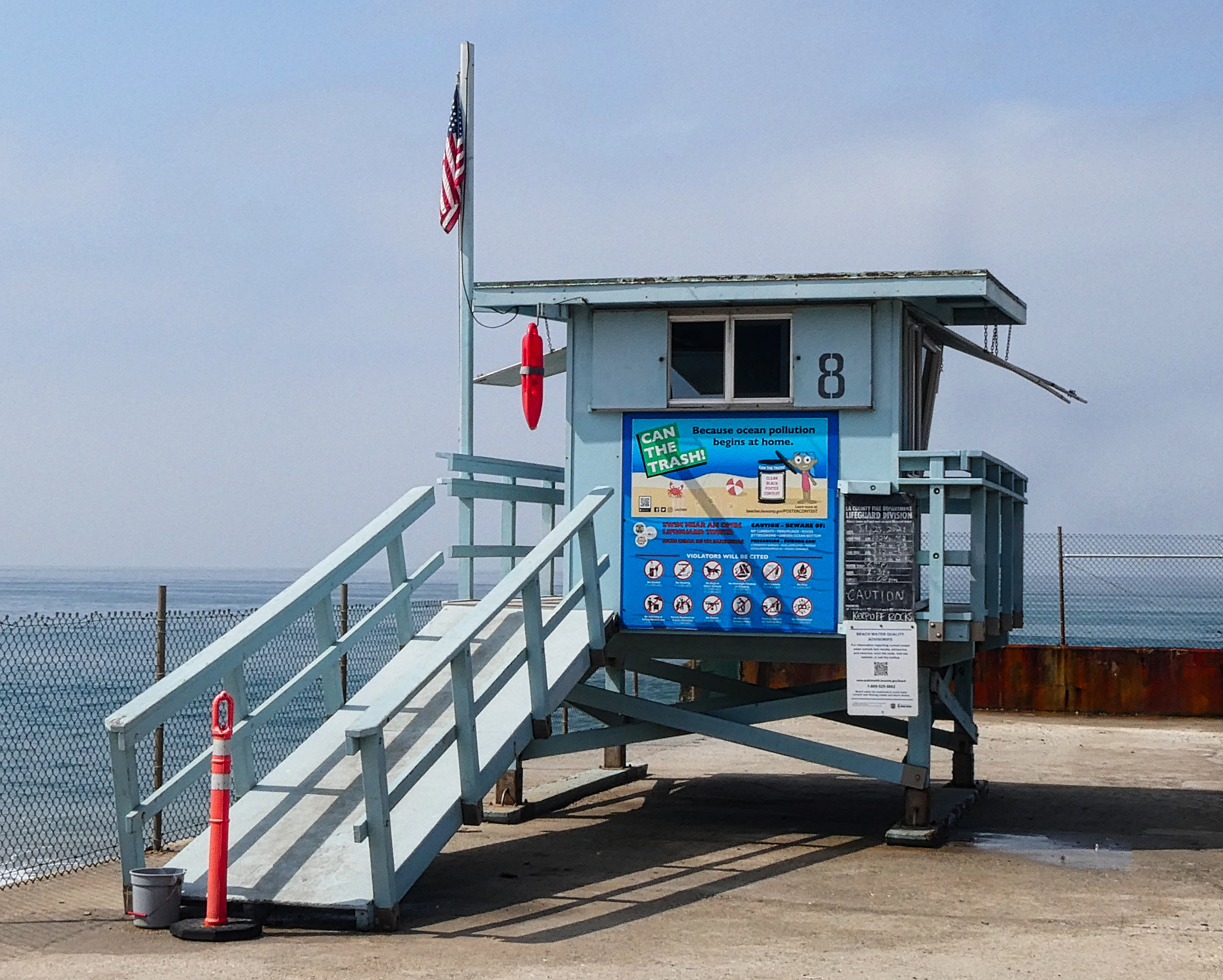
Lifeguard station

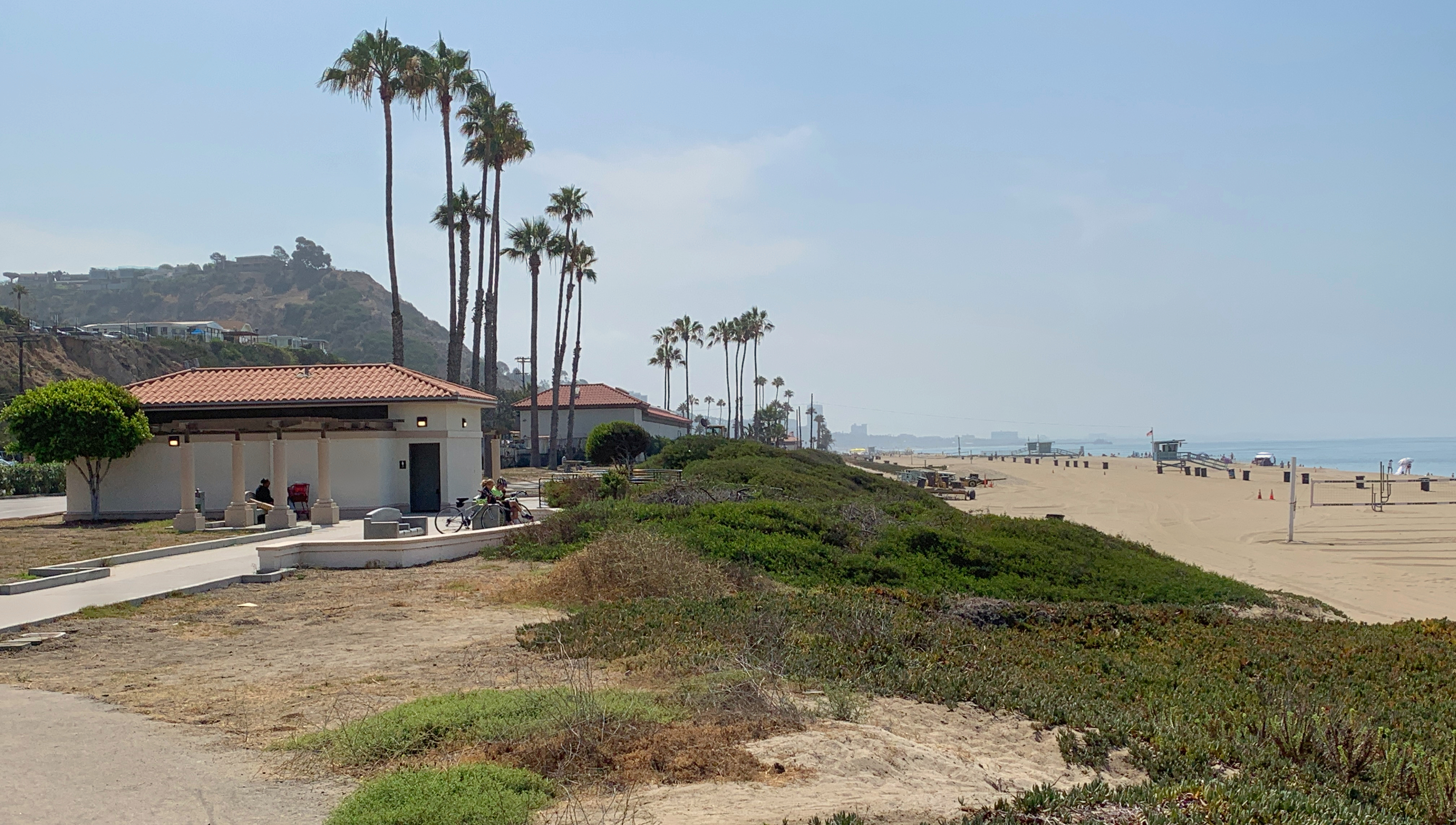
Beach - down coast view

== See also ==
- Will Rogers State Historic Park
- List of beaches in California
- List of California state parks
  - California State Beaches
