= Las Tunas Beach =

Los Angeles County, California, U.S.

Coordinates: 34.0392°N 118.5994°W

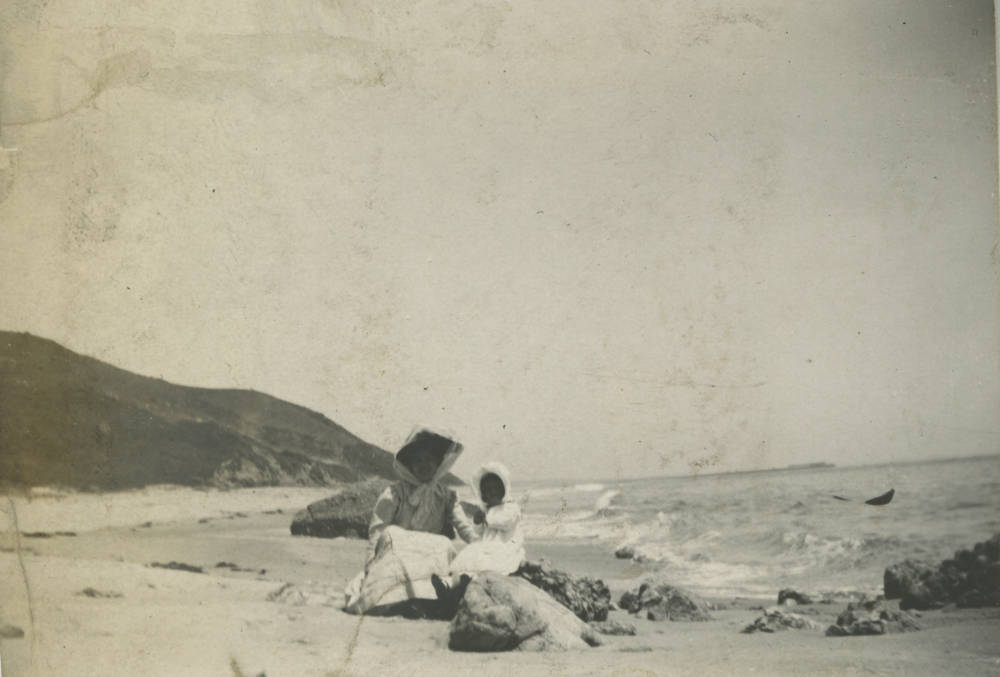
Mother and child at Las Tunas beach c. 1910 (Eric Wienberg Collection, Pepperdine Libraries)

Las Tunas County Beach and Las Tunas State Beach are public beaches operated by the Los Angeles County Department of Beaches and Harbors in Malibu, California, United States. Circa 1986, the beach was described as "little more than a dirt parking lot, a lifeguard station and a steep drop to the Pacific." The beach is named for its proximity to Tuna Canyon Road; las tunas are the fruit of the opuntia (prickly pear) cactus.

== History ==
In 1926, 20 houses were washed off the beach by a major winter storm. Natalie Talmadge owned a house at Las Tunas that burned in 1943.
