= Chace Park =

Park in Marina del Rey, California, United States

Burton Chace Park
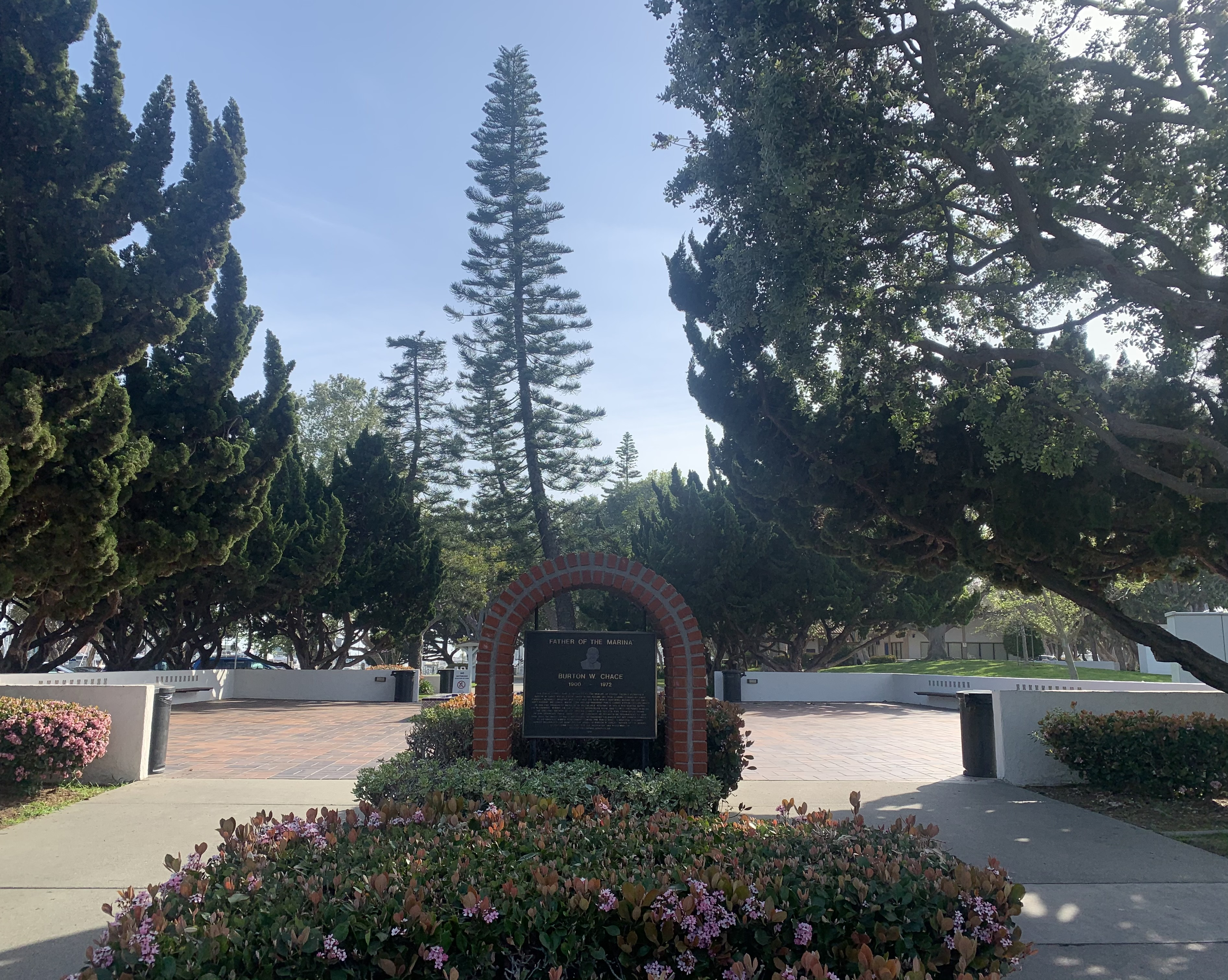
- Entrance to the park as of April 2021.
- Interactive map of Burton Chace Park
- Nearest city: Marina del Rey, California
- Coordinates: 33.977°N 118.446°W
- Area: 10 acres (4.0 ha)
- Created: 1972
- Operator: Los Angeles County Department of Parks and Recreation
- Open: 6am – 10pm, 7 days a week

Burton Chace Park is the largest public park in Marina del Rey, California. It is named after Burton W. Chace, a former Mayor of Long Beach and Los Angeles County Supervisor.

Comprising approximately 10 acres (4.0 ha), the park is located on Mindanao Way near Admiralty Way. The park is surrounded on three sides by water, and a green knoll rises in its center, from which the entire community can be viewed.

Public services include picnic grounds, shelters, barbecue grills, restrooms, community rooms, transient and guest docks, showers and facilities for boaters, and a seasonal cafe. Burton Chace Park is the location of many of the community's local fairs and festivals, including the Marina del Rey Holiday Boat Parade, MarinaFest, Discover Marina del Rey, and the Marina Summer Concerts.
