= Gregory Nelson (disambiguation) =

Gregory Nelson (born 1988) is a footballer.

Gregory Nelson may also refer to:

- Gregory R Nelson Sr., businessman

== See also ==
- Greg Nelson (disambiguation)
- Nelson Gregory, Home and Away character
