= Cathey =

Cathey is a surname of Scottish origin. It is a reduced form of the surname MacCathay which is Galloway surname of uncertain origin.

- Morgan Cathey (born 1984), American soccer player
- Key Glock (born 1997 as Markeyvius LaShun Cathey), American rapper
- Reg E. Cathey (1958–2018), American film and television actor

== See also ==
- Cathey Peak, a peak in the Sacramento Mountains, in the south-central part of the US State of New Mexico.
