= Carlsbad, California =

City in California, United States

- City
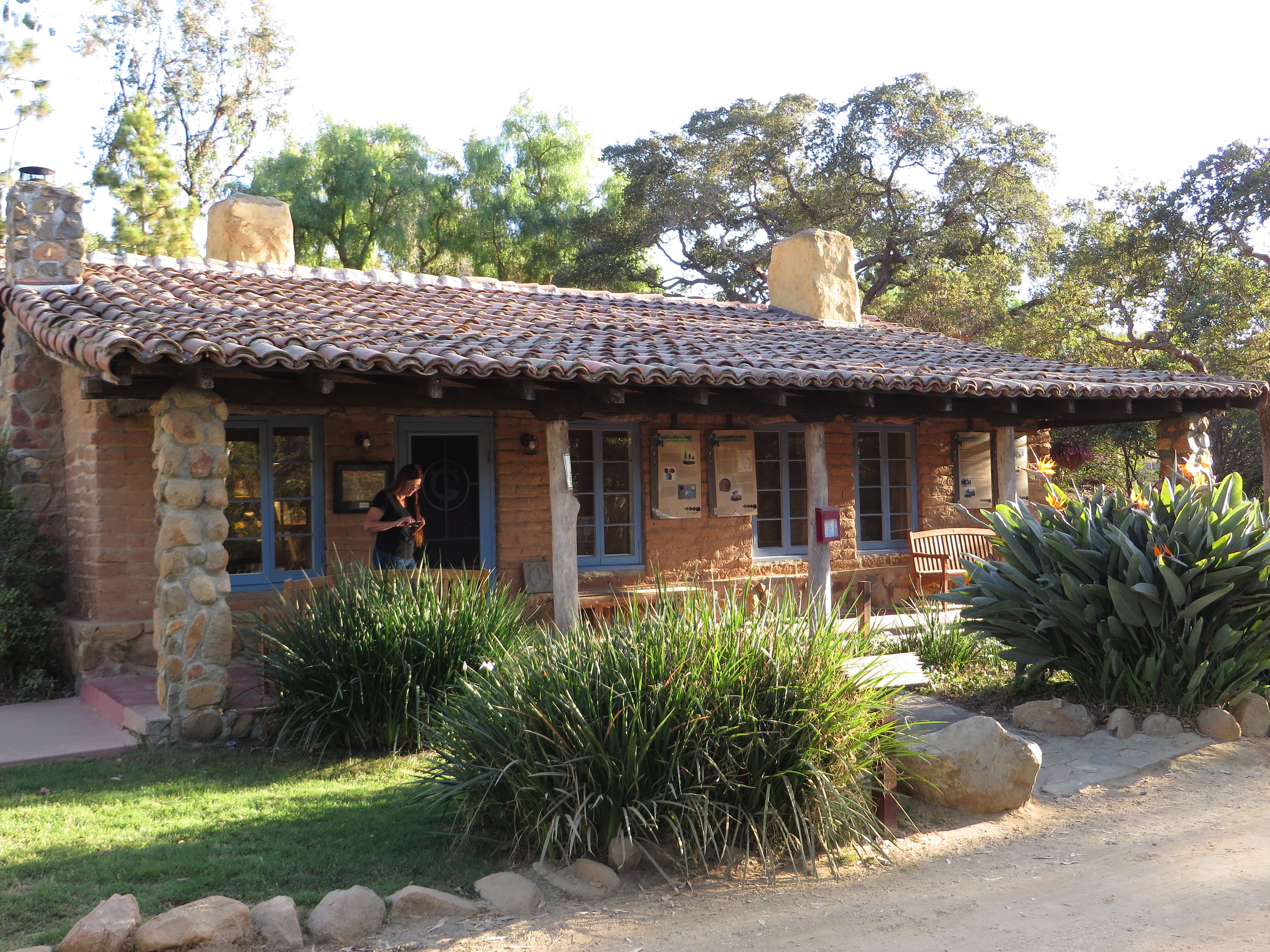
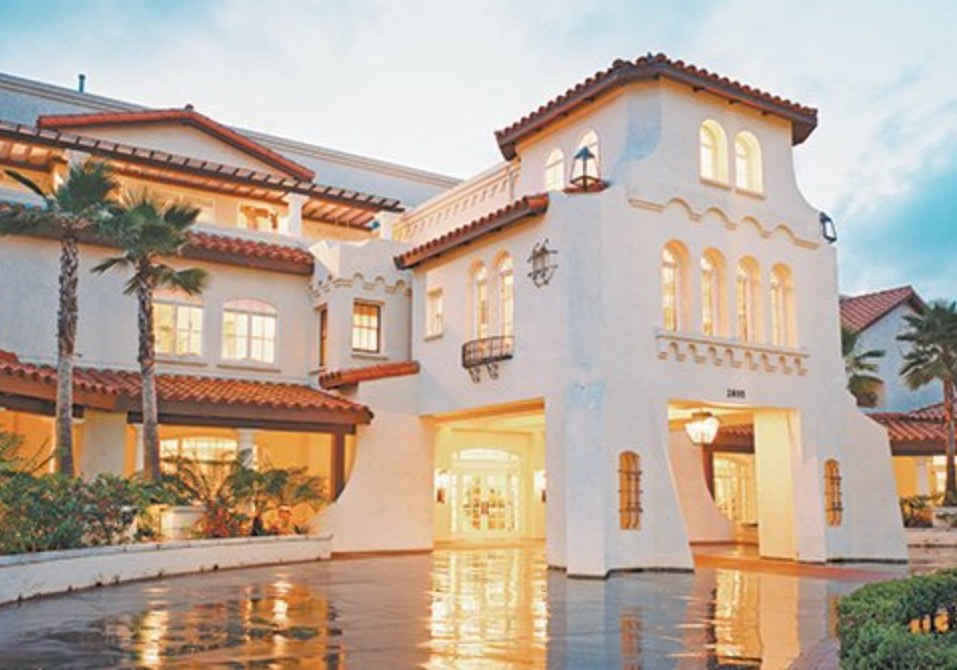
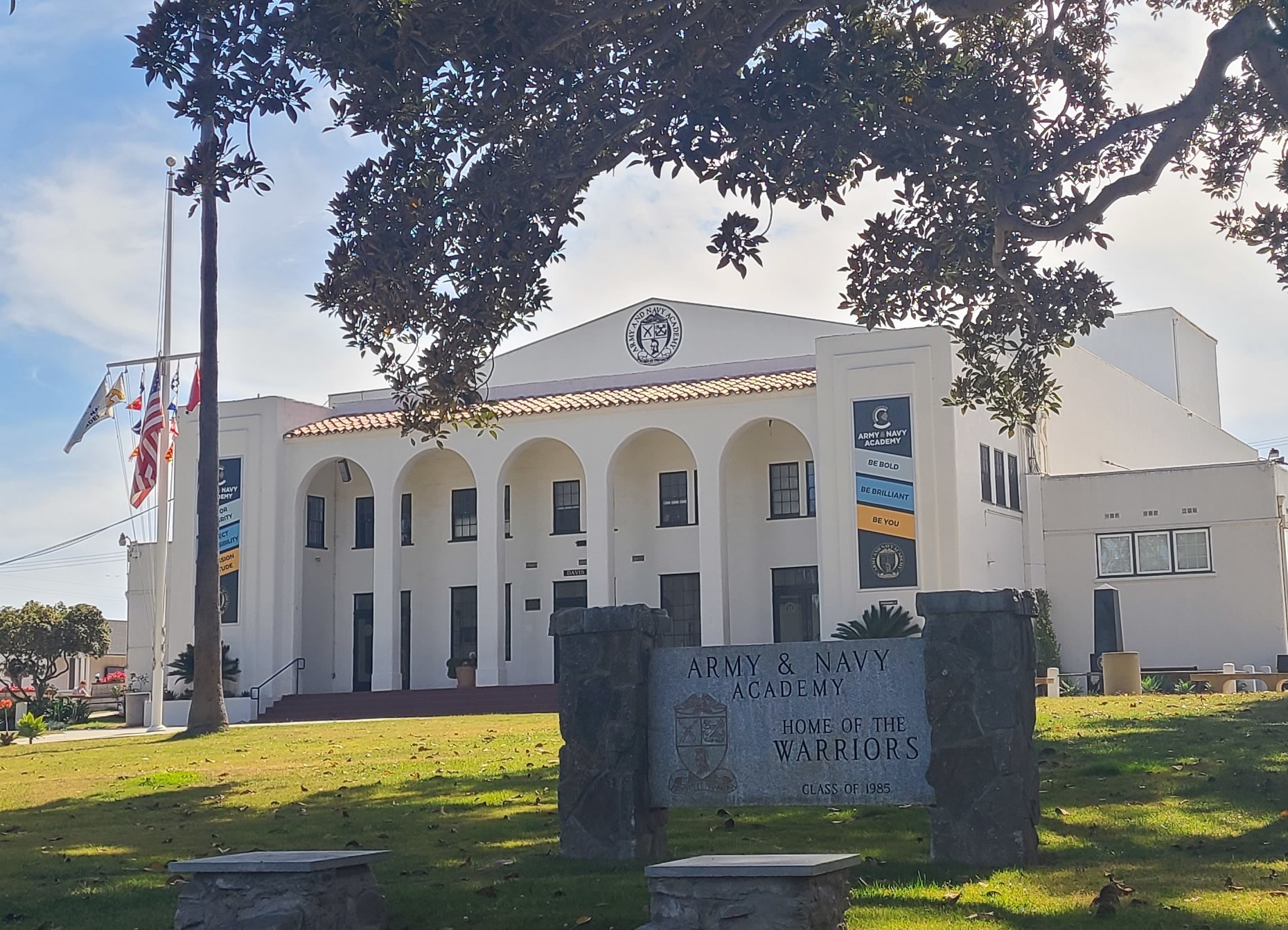
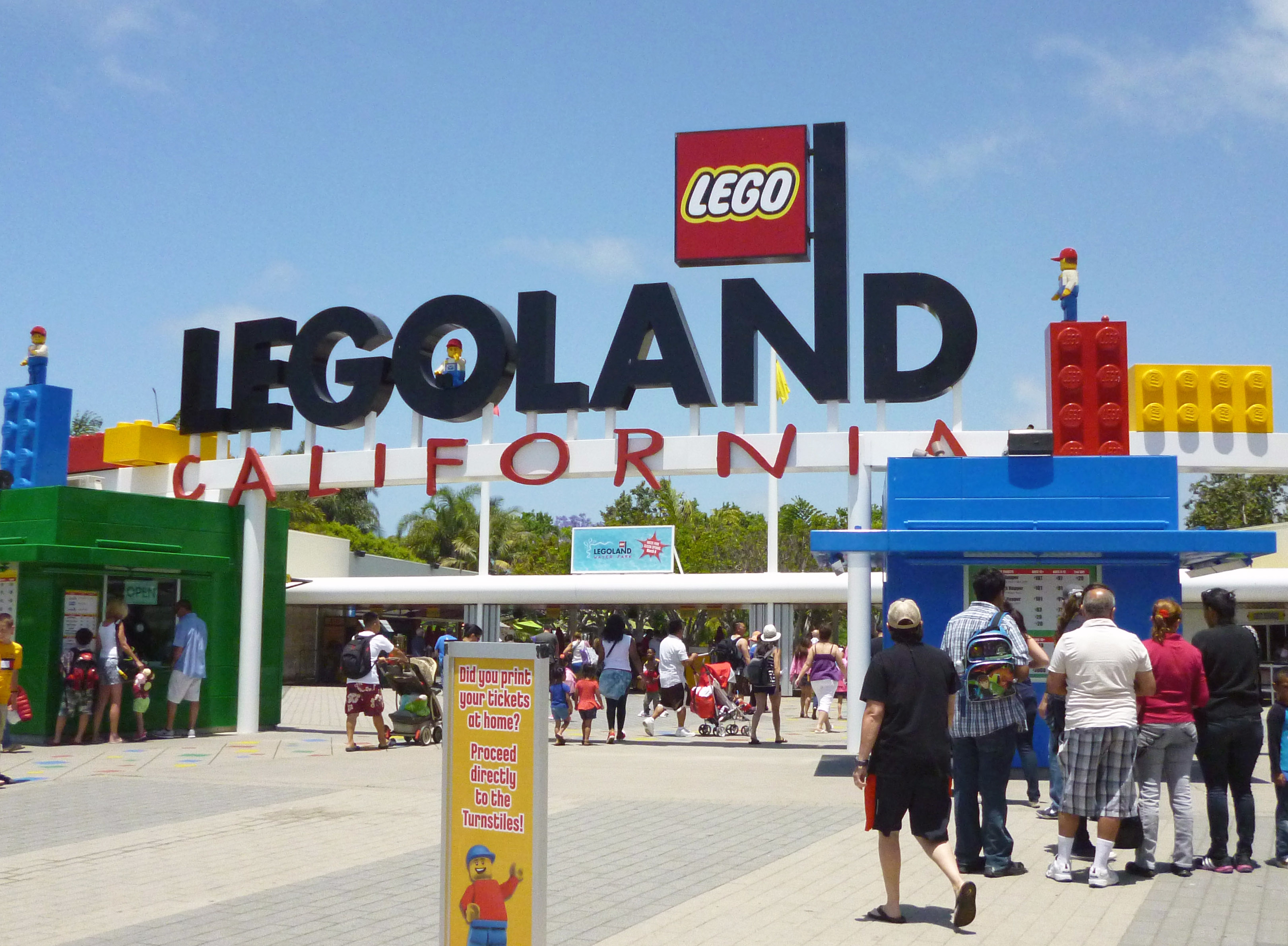
- Rancho de los Quiotes Carlsbad by the Sea Army & Navy Academy Legoland California

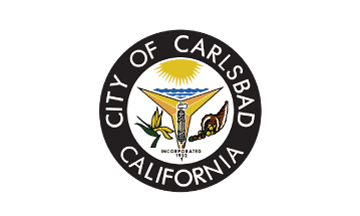
- Flag Seal
- Nickname: Village by the Sea
- Interactive map of Carlsbad, California
- Location in the United States Carlsbad (California) Carlsbad (the United States)
- Coordinates: 33°7′19″N 117°17′49″W
- Country: United States
- State: California
- County: San Diego
- Incorporated: July 16, 1952
- Named for: Karlsbad, Kingdom of Bohemia

Government
  - Type: Council–manager
  - Body: Carlsbad City Council
  - Mayor: Keith Blackburn

Area
  - Total: 39.08 sq mi (101.21 km^{2})
  - Land: 37.77 sq mi (97.83 km^{2})
  - Water: 1.31 sq mi (3.38 km^{2}) 3.55%
- Elevation: 52 ft (16 m)

Population (2020)
  - Total: 114,746
  - Rank: 5th in San Diego County; 57th in California
  - Density: 3,037.8/sq mi (1,172.91/km^{2})
- Time zone: UTC−8 (Pacific)
  - Summer (DST): UTC−7 (PDT)
- ZIP codes: 92008–92011, 92018
- Area codes: 442/760
- FIPS code: 06-11194
- GNIS feature IDs: 1660437, 2409984
- City flower: Bird-of-paradise
- Website: www.carlsbadca.gov

Carlsbad is a beach city in the North County area of San Diego County, California, United States. The city is 35 miles (56 km) north of downtown San Diego and 87 miles (140 km) south of downtown Los Angeles. As of the 2020 census, the population of the city was 114,746. Carlsbad is a popular tourist destination and home to many businesses in the golf industry.

== History ==
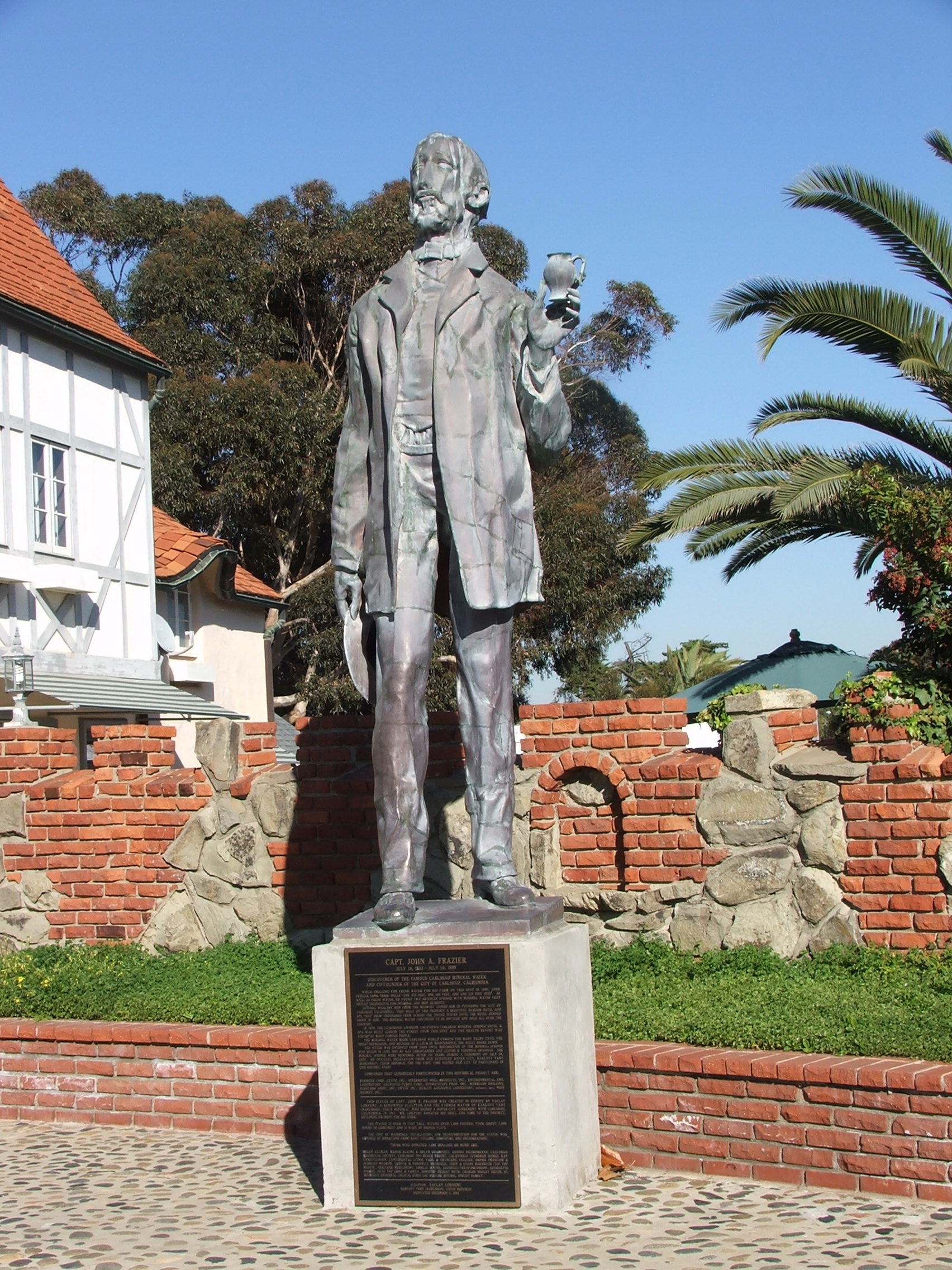
Statue of John Frazier

The first European land exploration of Alta California, the Spanish Portolá expedition of 1769, met native villagers while camped on Buena Vista Creek. Another Luiseño village within today's city of Carlsbad was a village at the mouth of the San Marcos Creek that the Kumeyaay called "Ajopunquile". A Kumeyaay village that was visited by Portolá was Hakutl, in the Rancho Ponderosa area.

During the Mexican period, in 1842, the southern portion of Carlsbad was granted as Rancho Agua Hedionda to Juan María Marrón.

In the 1880s, a former sailor named John A. Frazier dug a well in the area. He began offering his water at the train station and soon the whistle-stop became known as Frazier's Station. A test done on a second fresh-water well discovered the water to be chemically similar to that found in some of the most renowned spas in the world, and the town was named after the famed spa in the Bohemian town of Karlsbad in Karlovy Vary, Czech Republic.

To take advantage of the find, the Carlsbad Land and Mineral Water Company was formed by a German-born merchant from the Midwest named Gerhard Schutte together with Samuel Church Smith, D. D. Wadsworth and Henry Nelson. The naming of the town followed soon after, along with a major marketing campaign to attract visitors. The area experienced a period of growth, with homes and businesses sprouting up in the 1880s. Agricultural development of citrus fruits, avocados and olives soon changed the landscape. By the end of 1887, land prices fell throughout San Diego County. However, the community survived on the back of its fertile agricultural lands.

The site of John Frazier's original well can still be found at Alt Karlsbad, a replica of a German Hanseatic house, located on Carlsbad Boulevard.

In 1952, Carlsbad was incorporated to avoid annexation by its neighbor, Oceanside.

The single-runway Palomar Airport opened in 1959 after County of San Diego officials decided to replace the Del Mar Airport. The airport was annexed to the City of Carlsbad in 1978 and renamed McClellan–Palomar Airport in 1982 after a local civic leader, Gerald McClellan.

The first modern skateboard park, Carlsbad Skatepark, was built in March 1976. It was located on the grounds of Carlsbad Raceway, designed and built by inventors Jack Graham and John O'Malley. The skatepark was closed in 1979, leaving Del Mar Skate Ranch, approximately 20 minutes away, as the nearest skatepark for residents such as Tony Hawk. The site of the original Carlsbad Skatepark and Carlsbad Raceway was demolished in 2005 and became an industrial park. However, two skateparks have since been developed.

In March 1999, Legoland California was opened as the first Legoland theme park outside of Europe. It is operated by Merlin Entertainments, which owns 70 percent of the shares. The remaining 30 percent is owned by the LEGO group and Kirkbi A/S.

Carlsbad is home to the nation's largest desalination plant. Construction of the Carlsbad Desalination Plant at Encina Power Station was completed in December 2015. Encina Power Station was demolished, despite efforts to preserve it as a historical landmark.

== Geography ==
According to the United States Census Bureau, the city has a total area of 39.1 square miles (101 km^{2}) of which 37.7 square miles (98 km^{2}) are land and 1.4 square miles (3.6 km^{2}) are (3.55%) water, the majority of which is contained within three lagoons and one lake.

The northern area of the city is part of a tri-city area consisting of southern Oceanside, northern Carlsbad and western Vista.

The ocean-side cliffs fronting wide white-sand beaches and mild climate attract vacationers year-round.

Types of households in Carlsbad city, California in 2015–2019. 56.6% was Married-couple households, 5.1% was cohabiting couple households, 13.6% male householder no spouse, 24.7% female householder no spouse.

=== Climate ===
Carlsbad has a cool semi-arid climate (Köppen BSk) with Mediterranean rainfall patterns, and averages 263 sunny days per year. Winters are mild with periodic though erratic rain: the wettest "rain year" from July 2022 to June 2023 saw 21.56 inches or 547.6 millimeters, but the driest from July 2001 to June 2002 only 3.62 inches or 91.9 millimeters. The wettest month of January 2023 saw 7.18 inches (182.4 mm) of rain, and the wettest day of February 27, 2017, 3.23 inches or 82.0 millimeters. Frost is rare along the coast, but sometimes occurs in inland valleys in December and January. Summer is almost rain-free, but overcast and cool with fog off the Pacific. While most days have mild and pleasant temperatures, hot dry Santa Ana winds bring high temperatures on a few days each year, mostly in the fall.

Climate data for Carlsbad, California (McClellan–Palomar Airport), 1991–2020 normals, extremes 1998–present
Month	Jan	Feb	Mar	Apr	May	Jun	Jul	Aug	Sep	Oct	Nov	Dec	Year
Record high °F (°C)	90 (32)	90 (32)	93 (34)	92 (33)	86 (30)	89 (32)	98 (37)	95 (35)	103 (39)	104 (40)	99 (37)	86 (30)	104 (40)
Mean maximum °F (°C)	80.9 (27.2)	78.9 (26.1)	80.6 (27.0)	81.2 (27.3)	77.3 (25.2)	79.3 (26.3)	83.5 (28.6)	85.3 (29.6)	90.5 (32.5)	91.7 (33.2)	87.5 (30.8)	78.5 (25.8)	96.1 (35.6)
Mean daily maximum °F (°C)	65.0 (18.3)	64.0 (17.8)	64.5 (18.1)	66.3 (19.1)	67.6 (19.8)	69.9 (21.1)	74.2 (23.4)	75.8 (24.3)	75.7 (24.3)	73.3 (22.9)	69.5 (20.8)	64.6 (18.1)	69.2 (20.7)
Daily mean °F (°C)	56.4 (13.6)	56.3 (13.5)	57.6 (14.2)	59.8 (15.4)	62.5 (16.9)	65.1 (18.4)	69.2 (20.7)	70.5 (21.4)	69.6 (20.9)	66.1 (18.9)	60.8 (16.0)	56.0 (13.3)	62.5 (16.9)
Mean daily minimum °F (°C)	47.8 (8.8)	48.5 (9.2)	50.8 (10.4)	53.3 (11.8)	57.4 (14.1)	60.3 (15.7)	64.1 (17.8)	65.3 (18.5)	63.6 (17.6)	58.9 (14.9)	52.1 (11.2)	47.3 (8.5)	55.8 (13.2)
Mean minimum °F (°C)	39.9 (4.4)	40.4 (4.7)	44.5 (6.9)	47.9 (8.8)	53.2 (11.8)	56.9 (13.8)	61.8 (16.6)	62.3 (16.8)	58.5 (14.7)	52.4 (11.3)	45.5 (7.5)	38.9 (3.8)	37.3 (2.9)
Record low °F (°C)	33 (1)	36 (2)	38 (3)	39 (4)	45 (7)	50 (10)	57 (14)	57 (14)	54 (12)	46 (8)	37 (3)	32 (0)	32 (0)
Average rainfall inches (mm)	2.94 (75)	2.64 (67)	1.61 (41)	0.88 (22)	0.28 (7.1)	0.06 (1.5)	0.08 (2.0)	0.03 (0.76)	0.11 (2.8)	0.50 (13)	0.99 (25)	1.72 (44)	11.84 (301.16)
Average rainy days (≥ 0.01 in)	6.8	8.2	7.2	5.0	3.4	1.2	0.8	0.6	2.2	4.3	5.9	7.6	53.2
Source 1: NOAA
Source 2: National Weather Service (mean maxima/minima 2006–2020)

=== Neighborhoods ===
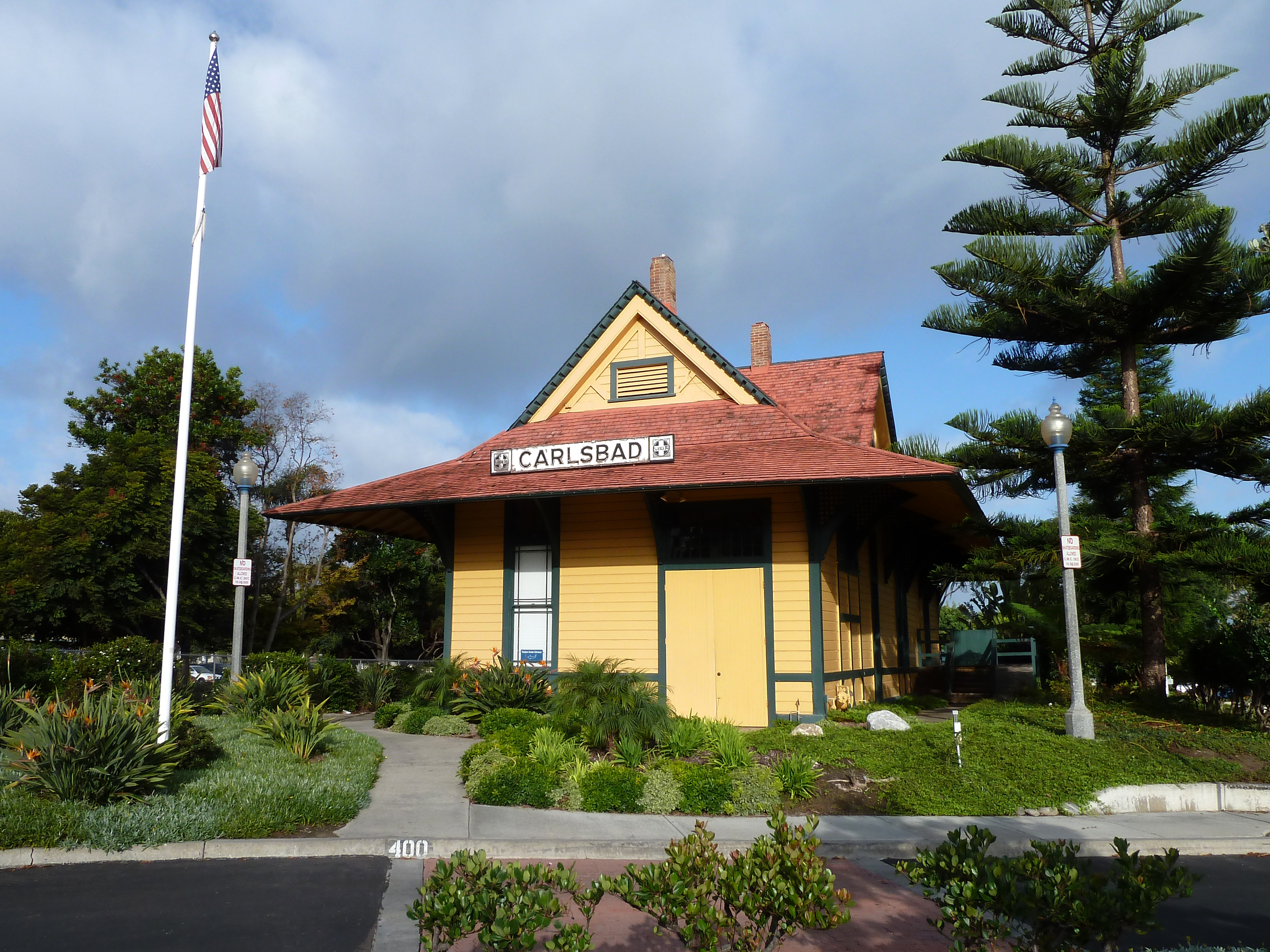
The Old Santa Fe Depot, built in 1907, is a local landmark listed on the National Register of Historic Places and houses the city's Visitor's Information Center.

For city planning and growth management purposes, Carlsbad is divided into four distinct quadrants.

==== Northwest quadrant ====
The northwest quadrant of Carlsbad (ZIP code 92008) includes the downtown "Village", "The Barrio", and "Olde Carlsbad." It was the first part of Carlsbad to be settled. Homes range from 1950s cottages and bungalows, 1960s ranch style houses, to elegant mansions on hills overlooking the ocean. It is also home to Hosp Grove Park, a grove of eucalyptus trees relatively untouched by development and designated by the city for recreational use, in addition to the Buena Vista and Agua Hedionda Lagoons. It is located west of El Camino Real and north of Palomar Airport Road.

"The Barrio" area is near downtown Carlsbad bordered by Carlsbad Village Drive to the north, Tamarack Avenue to the south, Interstate 5 to the east and the railroad tracks to the west. It was settled by Latinos in the early 20th century. It is the site of the Centro de Aprendizaje, a Spanish division of the Carlsbad City Library.

==== Northeast quadrant ====
This quadrant (ZIP code 92010) is located east of El Camino Real and north of Palomar Airport Road and consists mostly of single-family homes, with larger lots found in the older area known as Chestnut Hills and the newer developments around Calavera Hills.

The Northeast quadrant also contains the Lake Calavera Nature Preserve, a 110-acre space containing a 513-foot extinct volcano known as Mount Calavera. The preserve — notable for its small lake, wide dam, and mountain — was officially set aside in the 1990s as the surrounding land was being developed. The preserve is bordered on three sides by suburban single-family homes, and on one side by small farms and rural compounds. In 2012, Sage Creek High School was developed in the southwest corner of the preserve amid some controversy. Nature experts challenged the decision to construct the school on the preserve, but Carlsbad High School was reaching its capacity and there were few undeveloped areas that had sufficient space for an additional high school. Despite missing one of its original corners, the preserve still offers miles of hiking trails with ocean views.

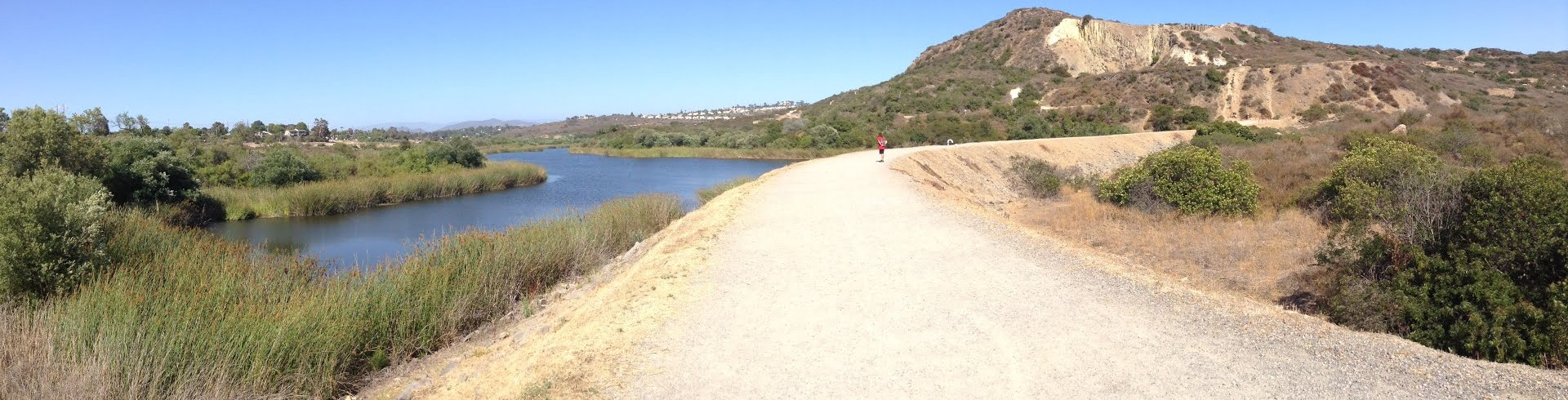
Calavera Lake and Mount Calavera on the eastern boundary of Carlsbad

==== Southeast quadrant ====
The southeast quadrant (ZIP code 92009) is located east of El Camino Real and south of Palomar Airport Road and features several newer expensive master-planned communities set among hillsides, golf courses, Alga Norte Community Park and permanent open spaces. It includes Bressi Ranch and the La Costa neighborhoods of Rancho La Costa, La Costa Ridge, La Costa Oaks, La Costa Greens, La Costa Valley, and Rancho Carillo. In 1965, La Costa gave its name to the Gold Medal Golf Resort, La Costa Resort and Spa, now known as Omni La Costa Resort & Spa. Residents here are served by the Carlsbad Unified School District, San Marcos Unified School District and the Encinitas Union School District.

==== Southwest quadrant ====
This quadrant (ZIP code 92011) extends along the Pacific Ocean to the south of the center of Carlsbad. It includes the Aviara neighborhood, which is home to the Park Hyatt Aviara Resort. It is located west of El Camino Real and south of Palomar Airport Road.

== Demographics ==
Historical population
Census	Pop.	Note	%±
1960	9,253		—
1970	14,944		61.5%
1980	35,490		137.5%
1990	63,126		77.9%
2000	78,247		24.0%
2010	105,328		34.6%
2020	114,746		8.9%
2023 (est.)	114,549	▼	−0.2%
U.S. Decennial Census; 1860–1870 1880-1890; 1900 1910 1920; 1930 1940 1950; 1960 1970 1980; 1990 2000 2010; 2020

Carlsbad is part of the San Diego-Chula Vista-Carlsbad, CA Metropolitan Statistical Area.

Carlsbad city, California – Racial and ethnic composition Note: the US Census treats Hispanic/Latino as an ethnic category. This table excludes Latinos from the racial categories and assigns them to a separate category. Hispanics/Latinos may be of any race.
Race / Ethnicity (NH = Non-Hispanic)	Pop 2000	Pop 2010	Pop 2020	% 2000	% 2010	% 2020
White alone (NH)	63,013	78,879	79,201	80.53%	74.89%	69.02%
Black or African American alone (NH)	691	1,232	1,231	0.88%	1.17%	1.07%
Native American or Alaska Native alone (NH)	201	271	259	0.26%	0.26%	0.23%
Asian alone (NH)	3,271	7,336	9,004	4.18%	6.96%	7.85%
Native Hawaiian or Pacific Islander alone (NH)	132	182	196	0.17%	0.17%	0.17%
Other race alone (NH)	116	235	624	0.15%	0.22%	0.54%
Mixed race or Multiracial (NH)	1,653	3,205	6,929	2.11%	3.04%	6.04%
Hispanic or Latino (any race)	9,170	13,988	17,302	11.72%	13.28%	15.08%
Total	78,247	105,328	114,746	100.00%	100.00%	100.00%

=== 2020 ===
The 2020 United States census reported that Carlsbad had a population of 114,746. The population density was 3,037.8 inhabitants per square mile (1,172.9/km^{2}). The racial makeup of Carlsbad was 72.6% White, 1.07% African American, 0.6% Native American, 8.0% Asian, 0.2% Pacific Islander, 4.8% from other races, and 12.7% from two or more races. Hispanic or Latino of any race were 15.1% of the population.

The census reported that 99.5% of the population lived in households, 0.2% lived in non-institutionalized group quarters, and 0.3% were institutionalized.

There were 44,775 households, out of which 31.6% included children under the age of 18, 55.9% were married-couple households, 5.6% were cohabiting couple households, 24.4% had a female householder with no partner present, and 14.2% had a male householder with no partner present. 23.3% of households were one person, and 11.1% were one person aged 65 or older. The average household size was 2.55. There were 31,086 families (69.4% of all households).

The age distribution was 21.8% under the age of 18, 7.2% aged 18 to 24, 23.0% aged 25 to 44, 29.0% aged 45 to 64, and 18.9% who were 65 years of age or older. The median age was 43.5 years. For every 100 females, there were 94.5 males.

There were 47,734 housing units at an average density of 1,263.7 units per square mile (487.9 units/km^{2}), of which 44,775 (93.8%) were occupied. Of these, 64.9% were owner-occupied, and 35.1% were occupied by renters.

In 2023, the US Census Bureau estimated that the median household income was $139,326, and the per capita income was $70,896. About 4.8% of families and 6.9% of the population were below the poverty line. Of the population 25 years and over, 96.1% graduated from high school and 61.4% held a bachelor's degree or higher.

=== 2010 ===
As of the 2010 United States census Carlsbad had a population of 105,328. The population density was 2,693.1 inhabitants per square mile (1,039.8/km^{2}). The racial makeup of Carlsbad was 87,205 (82.8%) White, 1,379 (1.3%) African American, 514 (0.5%) Native American, 7,460 (7.1%) Asian, 198 (0.2%) Pacific Islander, 4,189 (4.0%) from other races, and 4,383 (4.2%) from two or more races. Hispanic or Latino of any race were 13,988 persons (13.3%).

The Census reported that 104,413 people (99.1% of the population) lived in households, 459 (0.4%) lived in non-institutionalized group quarters, and 456 (0.4%) were institutionalized.

Out of 39,964 households in 2011, there were 26,992 (67.5%) families, of which 12,345 (30.9%) had children under the age of 18 living in them, 21,705 (54.3%) were married-couple families, 1,489 (3.7%) had a male householder with no wife present, and 3,798 (9.5%) had a female householder with no husband present. There were 12,972 (32.5%) nonfamily households, of which 10,198 (25.5%) were made up of a householder living alone and 3,299 (8.3%) were a householder living alone who was 65 years or over. The average household size was 2.55 and the average family size was 3.10.

The population was spread out, with 25,366 people (24.1%) under the age of 18, 6,718 people (6.4%) aged 18 to 24, 28,073 people (26.7%) aged 25 to 44, 30,373 people (28.8%) aged 45 to 64, and 14,798 people (14.0%) who were 65 years of age or older. The median age was 40.4 years. For every 100 females, there were 95.6 males. For every 100 females age 18 and over, there were 92.5 males.

There were 44,673 housing units at an average density of 1,142.2 units per square mile (441.0 units/km^{2}), of which 26,808 (64.8%) were owner-occupied, and 14,537 (35.2%) were occupied by renters. The homeowner vacancy rate was 1.4%; the rental vacancy rate was 4.6%. 69,855 people (66.3% of the population) lived in owner-occupied housing units and 34,558 people (32.8%) lived in rental housing units.

In 2011, the median household income was US$85,743 and the median family income was US$102,254, with 11.9% of households and 14.9% of families earning US$200,000 or more. Males had a median income of US$80,590 versus US$54,159 for females. The per capita income for the city was US$42,712. About 6.8% of families and 8.4% of the population reported income below the poverty line, including 10.1% of those under age 18 and 3.5% of those age 65 or over.

== Economy ==
Carlsbad's core industries include information technology, video game development, manufacturing, robotics, medical devices, life science, wireless technology, clean technology, action sports, tourism, design development and real estate. In 2013, Google named Carlsbad the digital capital of California with the strongest online business community.

Carlsbad is also known as the "Titanium Valley" because of its golf manufacturing industry. Callaway Golf Company, TaylorMade, Cobra Golf, and Titleist are all located in Carlsbad.

=== Top employers ===
According to 2025 figures, the top employers in the city are:

#	Employer	# of Employees
1	Viasat, Inc.	3,273
2	Legoland California	2,000
3	Thermo Fisher Scientific	1,982
4	Carlsbad Unified School District	1,152
5	Ionis Pharmaceuticals	1,028
6	Omni La Costa Resort & Spa	900
7	Genmark Diagnostics	822
8	City of Carlsbad	802
9	Gemological Institute of America	772
10	Park Hyatt Resort Aviara	704

=== Corporate headquarters ===
- Applied Spectral Imaging, multinational bioimaging technology company
- Aptera Motors, solar electric vehicle manufacturing
- Arkeia Software, network backup solutions
- Atticus Clothing, Apparel
- Business.com, online B2B marketing platform
- Callaway Golf Company, Golf equipment and apparel manufacturer
- Clear-Com, owned by HME; an electronics manufacturer of intercom systems
- Cobra Golf, Golf equipment and apparel manufacturer
- Fallen Footwear, Shoe company
- Gemological Institute of America, Gem Nonprofit
- Hay House, New Age Publisher
- Hot Dog on a Stick, Restaurants
- Islands Fine Burgers & Drinks, restaurant
- Jazzercise, International dance fitness program
- Jenny Craig, Inc., Weight management
- Kisco Senior Living, senior living
- Macbeth Footwear, apparel
- MaxLinear, Semiconductors
- No Fear, Apparel
- Osiris Shoes, Shoe company
- PC Power & Cooling, PC power supply manufacturer
- Rockstar San Diego, Video Game Developer
- Rubio's Coastal Grill, Quick-serve Restaurants
- TaylorMade Golf Company, Golf equipment and apparel manufacturer
- Upper Deck, Sports and entertainment trading card manufacturer
- Viasat, Inc., Satellite communications

== Arts and culture ==
=== Public libraries ===
- Carlsbad City Library (three branches)

=== Attractions ===
- Legoland California and Sea Life Aquarium at Legoland

Museums

- Carlsbad Historical Society
- Museum of Making Music
- Miniature Engineering Craftsmanship Museum

Garden

- The Flower Fields

== Parks and recreation ==
- Carlsbad State Beach
- South Carlsbad State Beach
- South Carlsbad State Beach

=== Golf ===
- Aviara Golf Club and The Aviara Golf Academy.
- Omni La Costa Resort & Spa
- The Crossings at Carlsbad.
- Rancho Carlsbad Golf Club

=== Open spaces ===
- Agua Hedionda Lagoon
- Batiquitos Lagoon
- Buena Vista Lagoon
- Lake Calavera Nature Preserve
- Rancho La Costa Preserve

== Government ==
=== Local government ===
In 2008, Carlsbad voters passed a measure to become a charter city (as opposed to the general-law municipality they had been before), approving the proposed charter by 82% and officially becoming such that same year.

Before the 2018 elections, city government was led by an elected mayor and four council members, elected at large; however, in July 2017, the city council voted to transition to district elections (except for the mayoral office, which remains an at-large position). Elections for Districts 1 and 3 were held in 2018, and in 2020, elections were held for the remaining Districts 2 and 4. As was the case before changing to district elections for the city council, city council members and the mayor are elected to 4-year terms. See the official district map here (not to scale).

Carlsbad's incumbent mayor is Keith Blackburn, who was elected in 2022.

In May 2018, the Carlsbad city council voted 4–1 to back the federal government's lawsuit against California sanctuary state law SB 54.

The city has drafted ordinances protecting sensitive wildlife habitat, becoming one of the first municipalities in California to do so. The city has also pledged to protect about 40 percent of the city as permanent open space.

=== Federal and state representation ===
In the California State Legislature, Carlsbad is in the 38th senatorial district, represented by Democrat Catherine Blakespear, and in the 77th Assembly district, represented by Democrat Tasha Boerner.

In the United States House of Representatives, Carlsbad is in California's 49th congressional district, represented by Democrat Mike Levin.

=== Politics ===
Carlsbad was a powerfully Republican stronghold during the 20th century, a classic bastion of suburban conservatism in Southern California. However, the GOP's edge in Carlsbad started to narrow in the 1990s and 2000s, with the city shifting Democratic. In 2008, Barack Obama, then the Democratic nominee for president, carried the city with a plurality. In 2012, Mitt Romney, the GOP nominee, carried the city by a 9% margin. In 2016, the city flipped back to the Democratic Party, voting for Hillary Clinton by a 10.4% margin over Donald Trump. Joe Biden expanded that margin to 17.6% over Trump in 2020.

Carlsbad city vote by party in presidential elections
Year	Democratic	Republican	Third Parties
2024	57.1% 39,377	40.1% 27,665	2.8% 1,948
2020	57.8% 41,826	40.2% 29,110	2% 1,483
2016	52.1% 30,493	41.7% 24,379	6.2% 3,636
2012	44.8% 24,224	53.3% 28,852	1.9% 1,043
2008	49.4% 26,668	49% 26,443	1.6% 881
2004	42.3% 20,122	56.8% 27,006	0.9% 442
2000	40.5% 14,873	55.1% 20,220	4.4% 1,615
1996	38.7% 11,568	51.4% 15,369	9.9% 2,991
1992	34.7% 10,361	41.4% 12,365	23.9% 7,145
1988	33.6% 9,117	65.3% 17,732	1.1% 316
1984	27% 5,034	71.8% 13,388	1.2% 229
1980	20.5% 3,281	69.2% 11,085	10.3% 1,649
1976	33.7% 3,141	64.7% 6,041	1.6% 152
1972	28.3% 1,390	67.3% 4,401	4.4% 187
1968	33.9% 1,651	59.1% 2,882	7% 341
1964	47.5% 2,049	52.5% 2,262

== Education ==
School districts:

- Carlsbad Unified School District
- Encinitas Union School District-for Elementary schools South of Carlsbad
- San Dieguito Union High School District-for Junior High and High schools in South Carlsbad
- San Marcos Unified School District-for schools in southeast Carlsbad

Public high schools:

- Carlsbad High School
- La Costa Canyon High School
- Sage Creek High School

Public intermediate schools:

- Aviara Oaks Middle School
- Calavera Hills Middle School
- Valley Middle School

Public interlevel schools:

- Carlsbad Seaside Academy (Independent Study)

Public elementary schools:

- Aviara Oaks Elementary School
- Buena Vista Elementary School
- Calavera Hills Elementary School
- Carlsbad Seaside Academy (K-6 Alternative Education)
- El Camino Creek Elementary School
- Hope Elementary School
- Jefferson Elementary School
- Kelly Elementary School
- La Costa Heights Elementary School
- La Costa Meadows Elementary School
- Magnolia Elementary School
- Pacific Rim Elementary School
- Poinsettia Elementary School
- Mission Estancia Elementary School
- Olivenhain Pioneer Elementary School
- Rancho Carillo Elementary School

Private Schools

- Army and Navy Academy
- Carlsbad Christian Academy
- Pacific Ridge School
- St. Patrick School

== Infrastructure ==
=== Transportation ===
The North County Transit District (NCTD) provides public transportation services in Carlsbad, including the Coaster commuter rail (with stops at Carlsbad Village station and Carlsbad Poinsettia station), Breeze bus service, the Carlsbad Connector microtransit service, and Lift paratransit service.

Interstate 5 runs through the western part of Carlsbad, while California State Route 78 passes close to its northern border.

McClellan–Palomar Airport is located about 7 miles (11 km) southeast of downtown Carlsbad, and allows general aviation and limited commercial service to the city.

== Notable people ==
- Frank Alesia, character actor and television director
- Tessa Bailey, romance novelist
- Brian P. Bilbray, U.S. Congressman
- Adam Brody, film and television actor; played Seth Cohen on The O.C.
- Francesca Capaldi, child actress
- Ron Capps, Active NHRA Funny Car driver, former Top Fuel driver, 2016 NHRA Funny Car Champion
- Leo Carrillo, actor, cartoonist, conservationist and preservationist, and owner of Leo Carrillo Ranch in Carlsbad
- Morgan Cathey, soccer player and coach
- Aaron Chang, surf and ocean photographer
- Brandon Chillar, linebacker for the Green Bay Packers
- Jim Cochran, pioneering organic strawberry farmer
- Jonathan Compas, center for Tampa Bay Buccaneers
- S.E. Cupp, journalist and political commentator
- David Díaz, Caldecott-winning illustrator/author
- Thomas Eshelman (CHS Grad 2012), MLB pitcher for Baltimore Orioles
- Drew Ferris (born 1992), football player for the Tampa Bay Buccaneers of the National Football League
- Jon Foreman, lead singer of alternative band Switchfoot
- Tim Foreman, brother of Jon Foreman and bassist for Switchfoot
- Robert C. Frazee, businessman and politician
- John A. Frazier, city founder
- Ryan Gallant, professional skateboarder
- Francis Gercke, actor and co-founder of New Village Arts
- Samantha Ginn, actress and stage director
- Sid Gillman, professional football player
- Troy Glaus, baseball player
- LeRoy Grannis, photographer
- Ryan Guy, football player for St. Patrick's Athletic
- Taylor Knox, professional surfer
- Ted Johnson, professional football player
- Michellie Jones, triathlete, 2006 Ironman world champion, 2000 Olympic silver medalist
- Josh Kalis, professional skateboarder
- Rod Laver, former world #1 Australian tennis player, retired in La Costa
- Fred Lynn, baseball player
- Sal Masekela, son of musician Hugh Masekela. CHS graduate. TV host for Winter X Games on ESPN
- Tim Miller, an original student of Ashtanga-yoga founder, K.P. Jois, and teacher of Ashtanga in the US.
- Martin Milner, television actor, Route 66 and Adam-12
- Jack Roland Murphy, jewel thief
- Dale D. Myers, former Deputy Administrator of NASA, three NASA Distinguished Service Medals
- Gregory R Nelson Sr., co-founder of DonJoy, Inc., CEO of United Orthopedic Group
- Emily O'Brien, The Young and the Restless actress; 2003 graduate CHS
- Kevin O'Connell, Minnesota Vikings head coach, former NFL quarterback
- Ron Packard, U.S. Congressman
- Kevin Pearce, snowboarder, public speaker and advocate for traumatic brain injury and Down syndrome research and education; extreme sport commentator
- Jean Peters, actress and wife of Howard Hughes
- John Pugsley, libertarian political activist
- Bridget Regan, actress known for her role as Kahlan Amnell on Legend of the Seeker
- Allard Roen, co-founder and the on-site Manager of the La Costa Resort and Spa in Carlsbad, California.
- Kerry Rossall, stuntman, actor and producer
- Boris Said, NASCAR Sprint Cup Series driver
- Mehdi Sarram, "Iran's first nuclear engineer"
- Julian Sayin, Quarterback for The Ohio State Buckeyes
- Steve Scott, champion miler
- Pancho Segura, former professional tennis player and coach
- Brian Simo, NASCAR Nationwide Series driver
- Sebastian Soto, professional soccer player for SC Telstar and the United States national team
- Staciana Stitts, 2000 Summer Olympics gold medalist swimmer; graduate CHS
- Brett Swain, professional football player.
- Victor Villaseñor, author
- Alex Warren, a singer and songwriter,
- Barbara Werle, actress and dancer
