= Greg Nelson =

Greg Nelson may refer to:

- Greg Nelson (producer) (born 1948), music producer
- Greg Nelson (make-up artist), Academy Award nominated make-up artist
- Greg Nelson (computer scientist) (1912–2015), American computer scientist
- Greg Nelson and Jenny Gardner, fictional characters from All My Children
- Greg Nelson (curler) on List of teams on the 2012–13 Ontario Curling Tour
- Greg Nelson (playwright) of Afghanada
- Greg Nelson (politician) in Louisiana gubernatorial election, 1979

== See also ==
- Gregory Nelson (disambiguation)
