= Carlsbad City Library =

Public library system in California, USA

Coordinates: 33°6′19.48″N 117°16′10.77″W

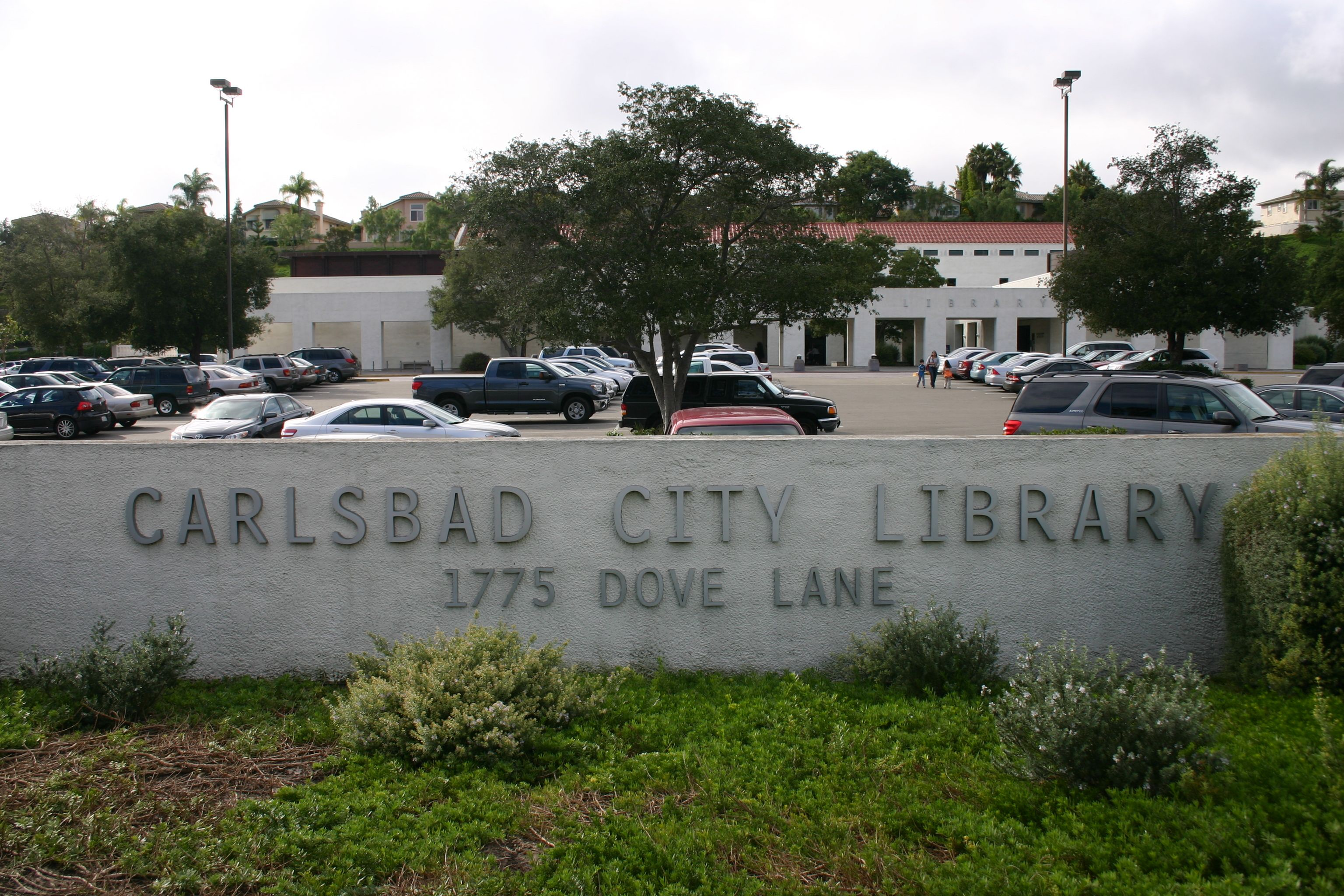
- Location: Carlsbad, CA
- Established: 1916
- Branches: 3

Collection
- Size: Over 200,000 items

Other information
- Director: Suzanne Smithson
- Website: library.carlsbadca.gov

The Carlsbad City Library is a public library in Carlsbad, California. Operated by the city government, the library consists of three branches: the Georgina Cole Library, the Dove Library, and the Carlsbad City Library Learning Center.

The first lending library collection in Carlsbad began in 1916 at a general store. Outgrowing the space, the book collection moved to a newspaper office, a former church building, a water company building, a former bank, and a former church. After the City of Carlsbad was incorporated, the library was taken over by the new city government.

== Georgina Cole Library ==
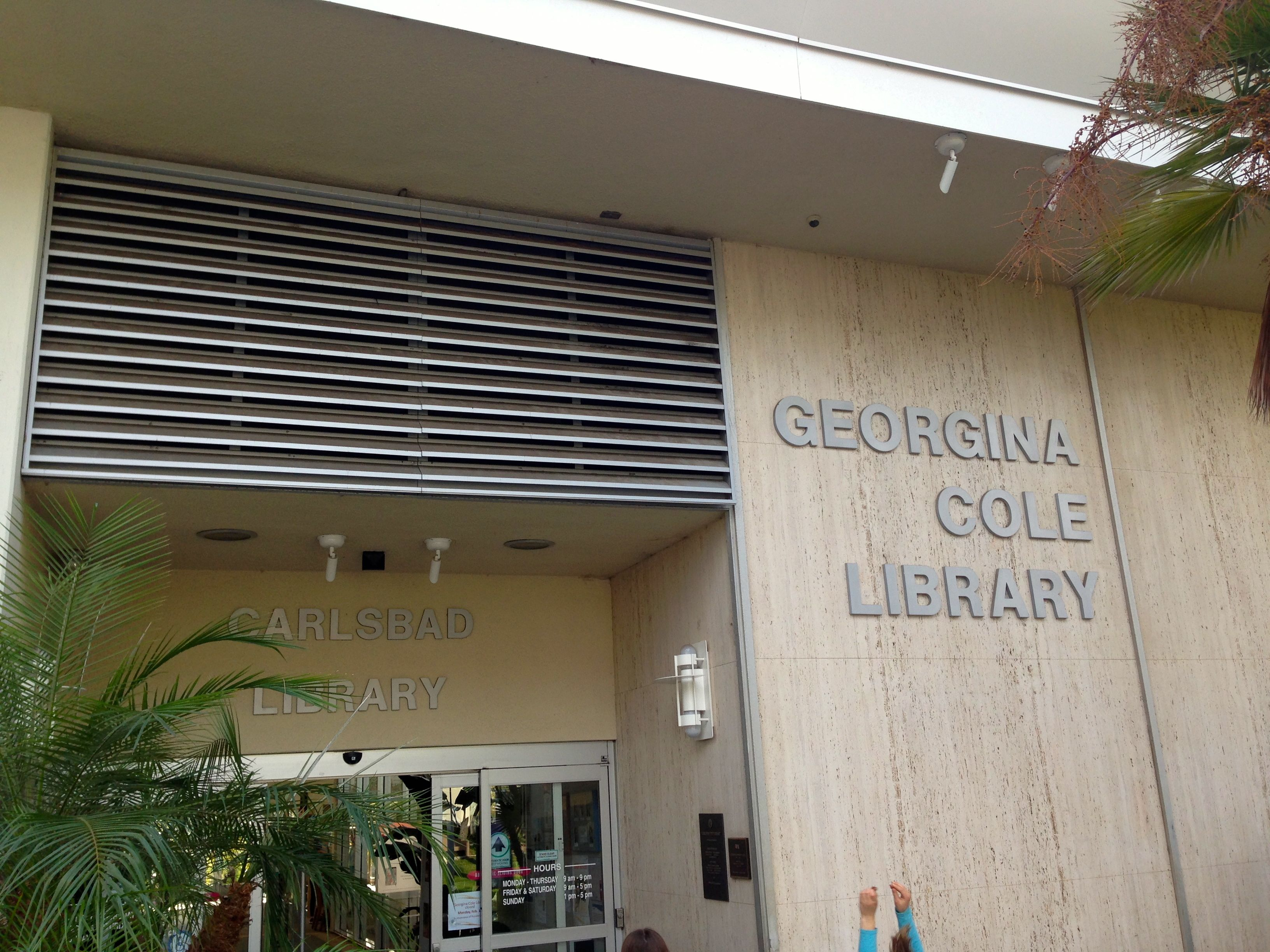
Georgina Cole Library

The Georgina Cole Library, named after the city's first library director, was opened in November 1967, and was the only library facility in the city for over thirty years. The facility contains a Carlsbad history archive and a genealogical room. It is located at 1250 Carlsbad Village Drive.

== Dove Library ==
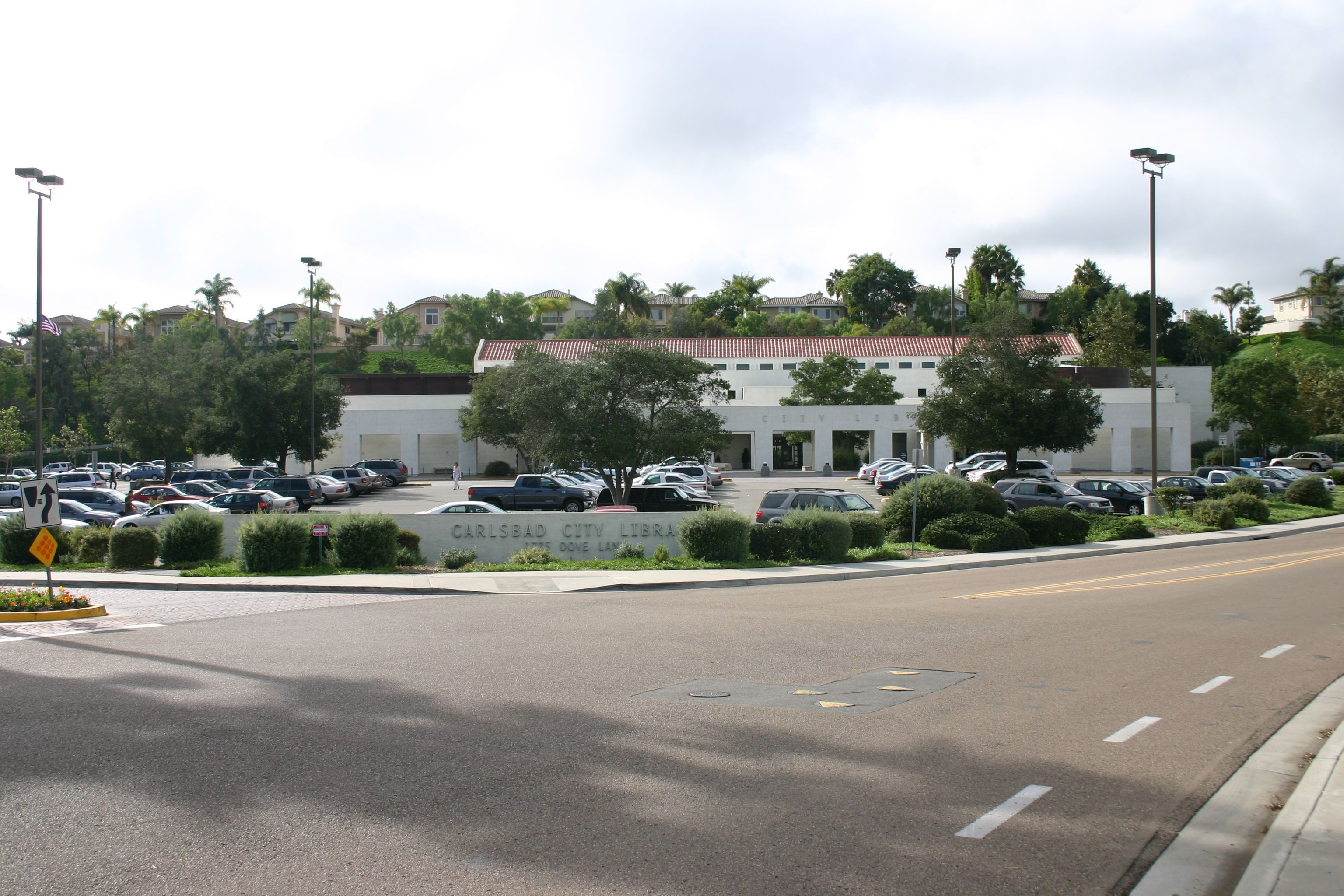
Dove Library

The Dove Library, which serves as the primary branch, opened in 1999, and was built to accommodate the library's expanding collection of materials. It houses the William D. Cannon Art Gallery, the Ruby G. Schulman Auditorium, and the Children's Garden. It is located at 1775 Dove Lane, and is the primary branch.

Friends of the Carlsbad Library and the Carlsbad Library and Arts Foundation support many of the library programs.

== Carlsbad City Library Learning Center ==
Located at 3368 Eureka Place, the Carlsbad City Library Learning Center houses bilingual Spanish-English materials, and offers adult literacy programs to the public.
