= South Carlsbad State Beach =

State park in California, United States

Coordinates: 33°06′14″N 117°19′10″W

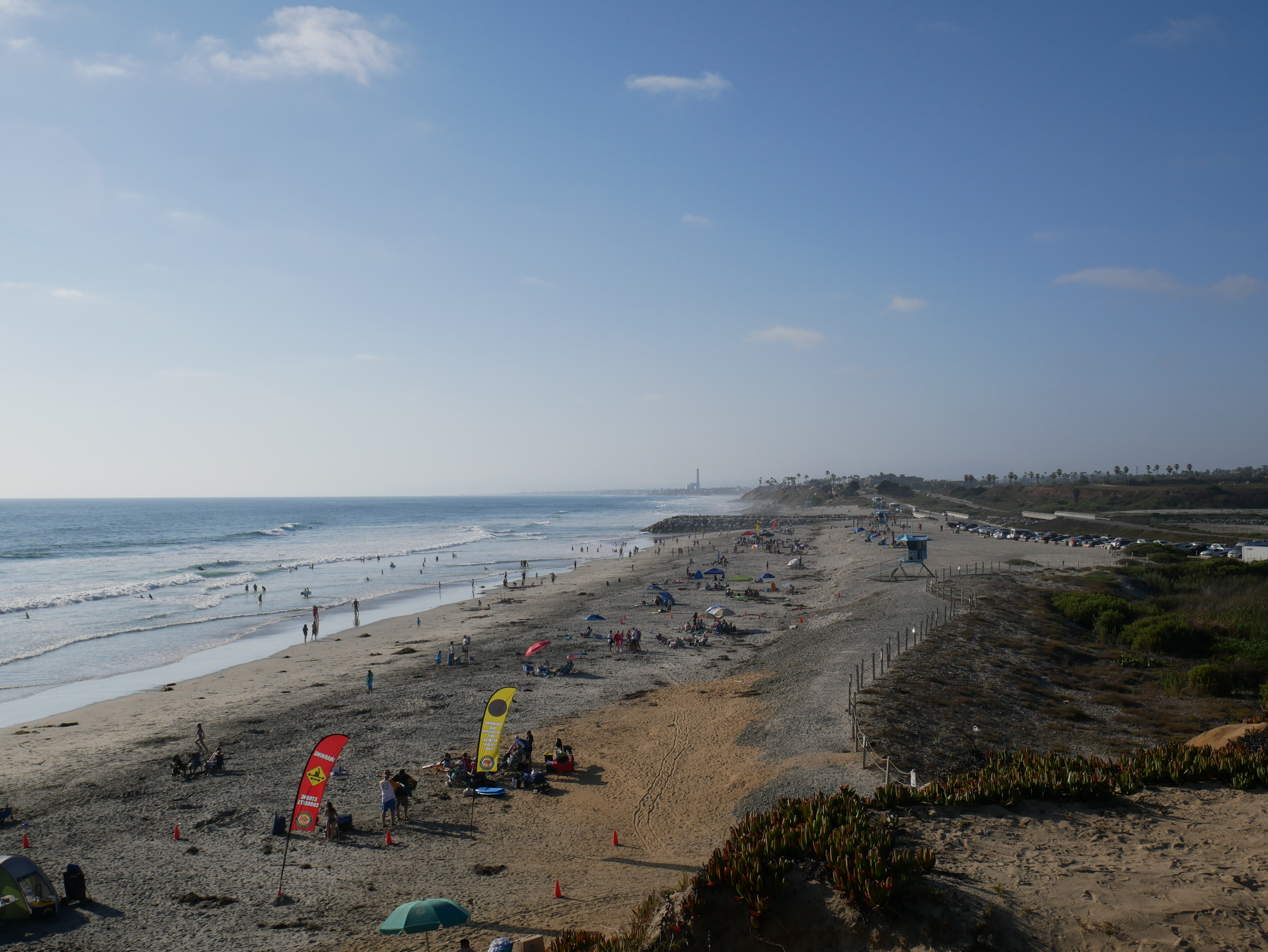
A large crowd enjoys a late afternoon on a Fourth of July weekend at South Carlsbad State Beach.

South Carlsbad State Beach (which includes South Ponto) is a public beach in Carlsbad, California.

Known for being a place for swimming, surfing, skin diving, fishing, and picnicking, the campground, which is led by the stairway from the beach, is very popular during the summer.

This beach is located immediately south of Carlsbad State Beach.

== See also ==
- List of beaches in California
- List of California state parks
