= The Flower Fields =

Flower garden in California, United States

Coordinates: 33.123066°N 117.317591°W

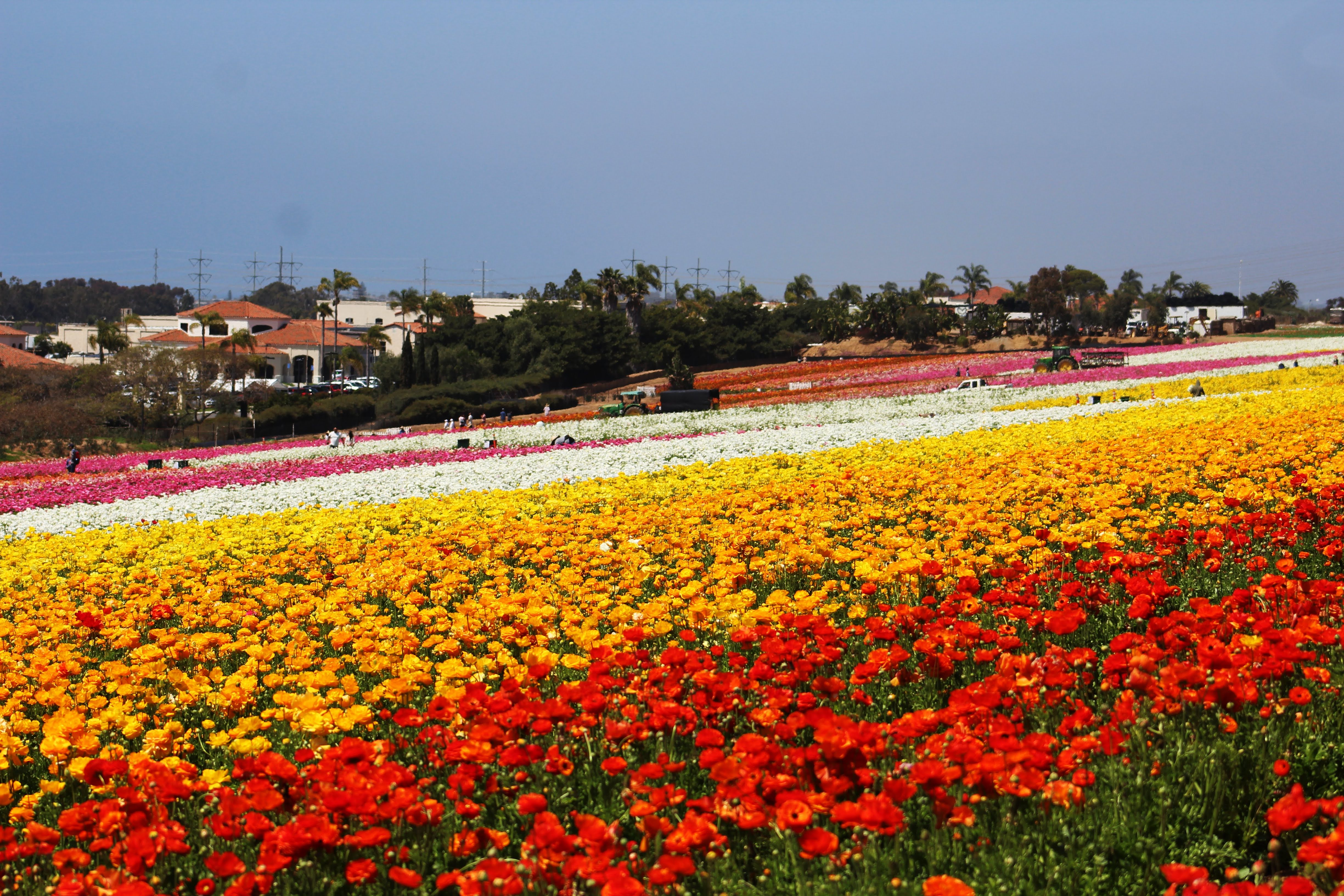
- The Flower Fields during Springtime, 2022
- Industry: Gardening
- Headquarters: Carlsbad, California, United States
- Area served: Southern California
- Website: theflowerfields.com

The Flower Fields is a flower garden in Carlsbad Ranch in Carlsbad, California. The Giant Tecolote Ranunculus flowers that make up the garden are in bloom for approximately six to eight weeks each year, from early March through early May. The garden is typically open to visitors between March 1 and Mother's Day. Volunteers lead educational tours of the fields.

== History ==
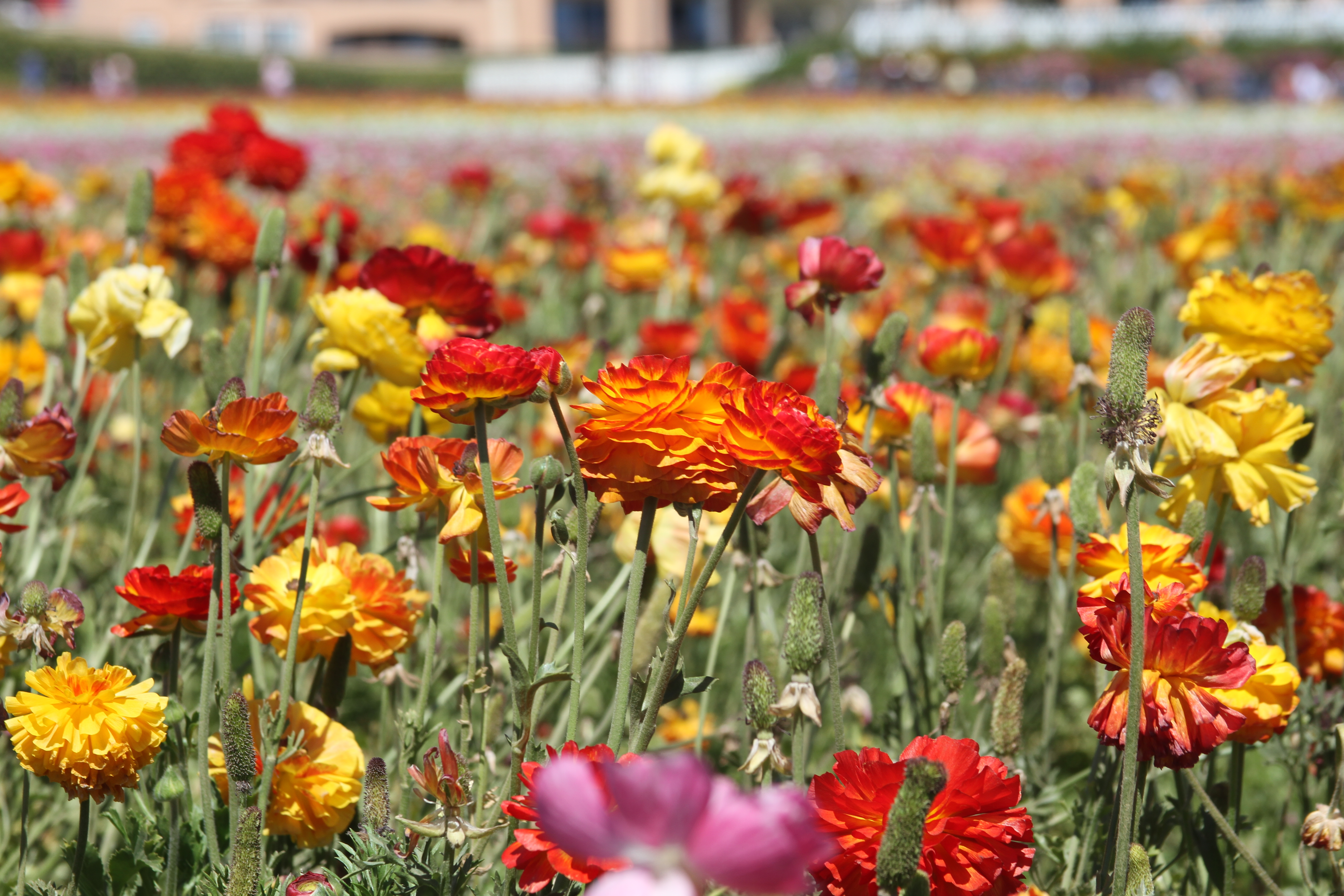
Assortment of flowers at The Flower Fields

In 2012, the color variants of the flowers were changed for the first time since 1997. The land under the Flower Fields has been used for a variety of different purposes, including amusement parks, shopping malls, and resorts. However, in 2015, the Flower Fields gained official protection from further development.

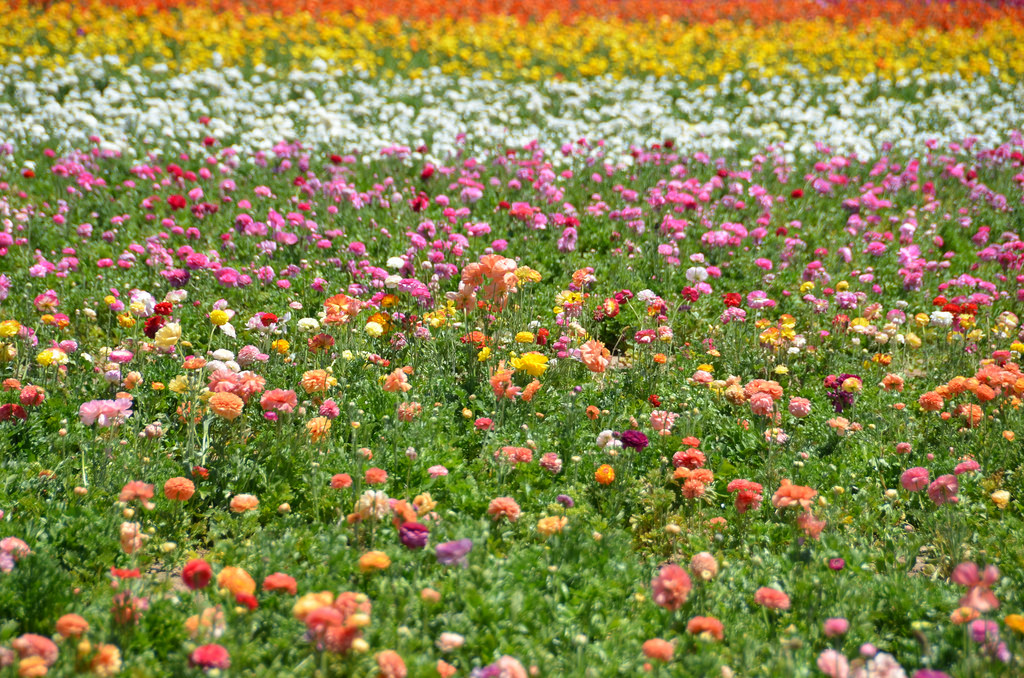
A picture of a field of colorful flowers found at The Flower Fields
