= Kisco Senior Living =

Kisco Senior Living, headquartered in Carlsbad, California, operates 32 diverse senior living communities offering independent living, assisted living, and in some locations, memory care.

== Business ==
Kisco Senior Living operates 32 communities totaling over 6,400 apartments. The company currently operates in 10 states and the District of Columbia (California, Colorado, Florida, Hawaii, Maryland, Massachusetts, North Carolina, Texas, Utah, Virginia, and Washington, D.C.). The current product mix includes independent living, assisted living, memory care and continuing care retirement communities. Slightly over one-half of Kisco’s existing inventory is focused on independent living with the remaining units dedicated to assisted living and memory care. A selection of communities feature cottage homes in addition to the main community buildings. Communities range in size from 84 to over 400 apartments. Annual revenues exceed $600 million and total value of assets under management exceeds $3.0 billion. Kisco operates three brands: Balfour, Signature, and Lifestyle.

=== Balfour Senior Living ===
In 2023, Balfour Senior Living became a wholly owned entity of Kisco Senior Living. The transaction brought the Balfour brand into the Kisco portfolio.

=== Kisco Signature ===
The company recently launched its Signature Communities portfolio, featuring locations that offer enhanced hospitality and services developed in partnership with Forbes Travel Guide. The Carnegie at Washingtonian Center in Gaithersburg, MD was the first of Kisco’s Signature Communities in the Northeast, followed by The Newbury of Brookline in Massachusetts. These communities join other locations such as Crestavilla in California and The Cardinal at North Hills in North Carolina. The fifth Signature community, The Fitzgerald of Palisades located in Washington, D.C. opened in June 2025.

== Background ==
Kisco began acquiring properties in 1990 and established its property management company in 1995. Andrew (Andy) S. Kohlberg is the Founder, President and Chief Executive Officer of Kisco Senior Living, LLC.
