= Mehdi Sarram =

Iranian Nuclear Engineer

Mehdi Sarram, born in Kerman, Iran, works in the global nuclear energy industry, particularly recognized for his contributions to the peaceful use of nuclear energy. Immigrating to the United States at the age of 18, Sarram became deeply ingrained in the American nuclear community. His legacy spans from Iran to the United States and other countries, significantly impacting the nuclear field.

== Early life and education ==
Sarram pursued his education in nuclear engineering at the University of Michigan, receiving his postgraduate degree in 1967. As an undergraduate, he joined the American Nuclear Society (ANS) in 1963. While studying, he gained practical experience, serving as a reactor operator and shift supervisor at the university's 2-MW Ford Nuclear Reactor. Upon completing his degree, Sarram returned to Iran, becoming the country's first nuclear engineer with a reactor license.

== Role in Iran's nuclear program ==
Upon his return to Iran, Sarram played a critical role in kickstarting the country's nuclear initiatives. He served as an assistant professor at the University of Tehran, teaching nuclear engineering and supervising the Tehran University Nuclear Center's (TUNC) 5-MW research reactor, which achieved initial criticality under his guidance on November 11, 1967.

In the early 1970s, as the Shah of Iran looked to diversify the country's energy sources, Sarram took on more influential roles within Iran's atomic energy efforts. By 1974, he was appointed to the Atomic Energy Organization of Iran, holding multiple directorial positions and reporting directly to high-level government officials. In 1977, Sarram chaired and organized the First International Conference on Nuclear Technology held in Persepolis, Iran.

However, the Iranian Revolution dramatically altered the course of Iran's nuclear ambitions. Projects initiated with Western collaboration, including two new 1,200-MWe nuclear reactors purchased from Germany, were halted. Amidst the changing socio-political environment, especially policies requiring his young daughter to adhere to strict religious dress codes, Sarram decided to leave Iran.

== Later career and achievements ==
After briefly serving at the International Atomic Energy Agency's Department of Safeguards in Vienna, Austria, Sarram returned to the United States in 1982. He took on various roles in the nuclear energy sector, from being the manager of nuclear analysis at United Engineers in Philadelphia to roles at Duke Energy and Areva Nuclear Power. In September 2023, the ANS commemorated Sarram's 60 years of membership, marking a notable milestone in his long-standing association with the organization.

While his primary focus was on nuclear matters, Sarram also turned his attention to environmental initiatives. In his adopted hometown, Carlsbad, California, he championed traffic signal synchronization as a means to reduce carbon emissions, believing that this strategy reduced CO_{2} emissions by about 60% in the city.

Beyond his professional contributions, Sarram has always been an active member of the ANS. He joined various local sections and has been an influential figure in their growth and recognition. He currently supports the American Nuclear Society San Diego local section.

== Publications ==
In 2015, Sarram published a book titled Nuclear Lies, Deceptions, and Hypocrisies, a culmination of five years of extensive research, which discusses the international nuclear developments and includes detailed commentary on the negotiations between Iran and the P5+1 nations (China, France, Russia, the United Kingdom, and the United States, plus Germany) that resulted in the Iran nuclear deal on July 14, 2015.
