= Craftsmanship Museum =

Coordinates: 33.1326°N 117.2382°W

- Established: 2006
- Location: 3190 Lionshead Avenue; Carlsbad, California
- Type: Technology museum
- Collections: Hand crafted models and machines
- Owner: Joe Martin Foundation for Exceptional Craftsmanship
- Website: craftsmanshipmuseum.com

The Miniature Engineering Craftsmanship Museum, also known as the Craftmanship Museum, is an American museum in Carlsbad, California, that collects and displays miniature models created of metal and wood. It was originally called The Joe Martin Craftsmanship Museum. The museum annually honors skilled artisans who create finely crafted miniature items.

== Collection ==
The collection includes hundreds of working miniature engines as well as models of aircraft, automobiles, and other objects. Especially notable are a 60-pound, 35-inch long Duesenberg, and two aluminum cutaway World War II fighter models. A Norden bombsight is displayed in the museum's collection.

=== 1932 SJ Duesenberg ===
Louse Chenot constructed an operational 1/6-scale model of a 1932 SJ Duesenberg. Construction required about 20,000 hours over 10 years. The engine runs on a gasoline-powered 32-valve, and has a working three-speed transmission.

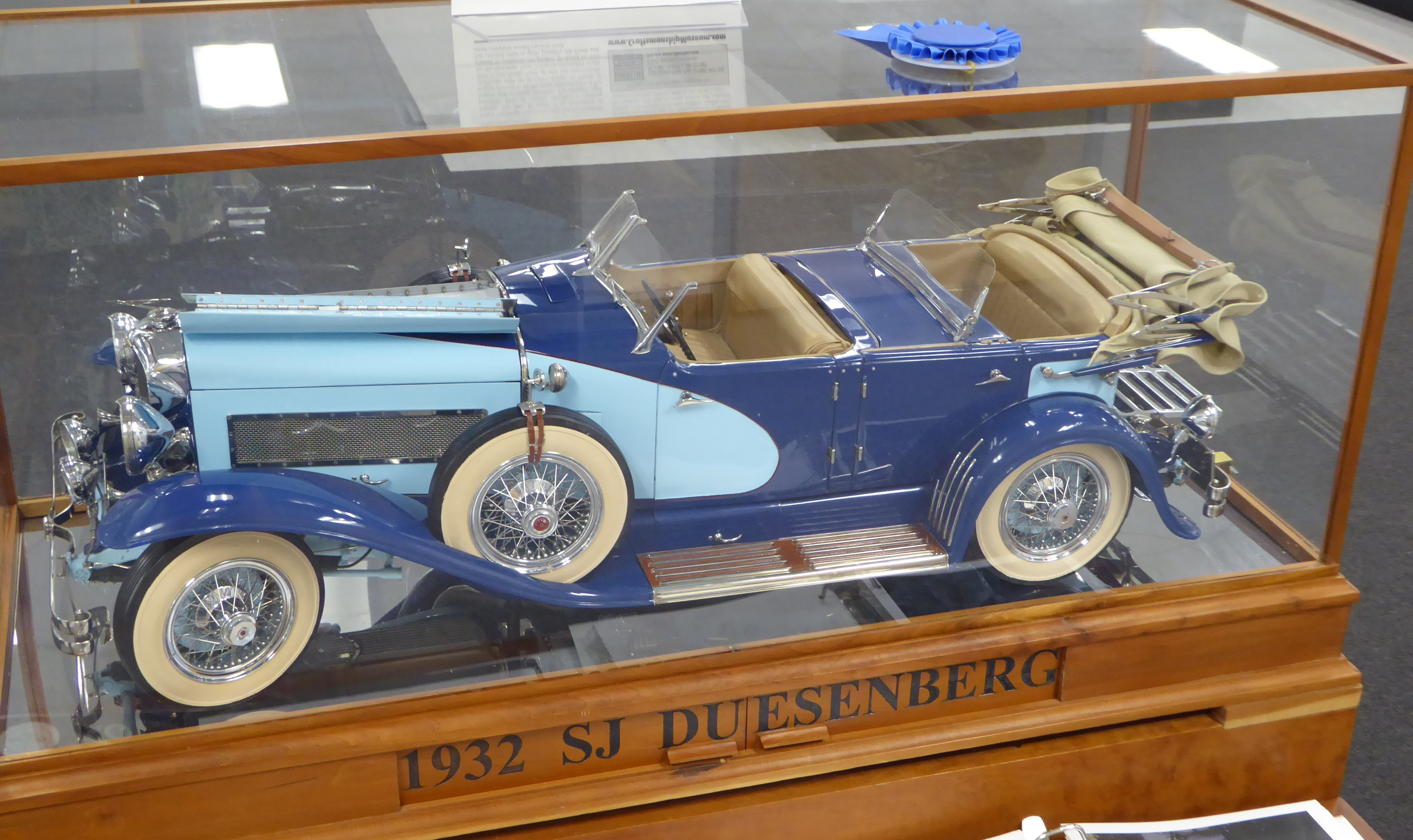
1932 SJ Dusenberg

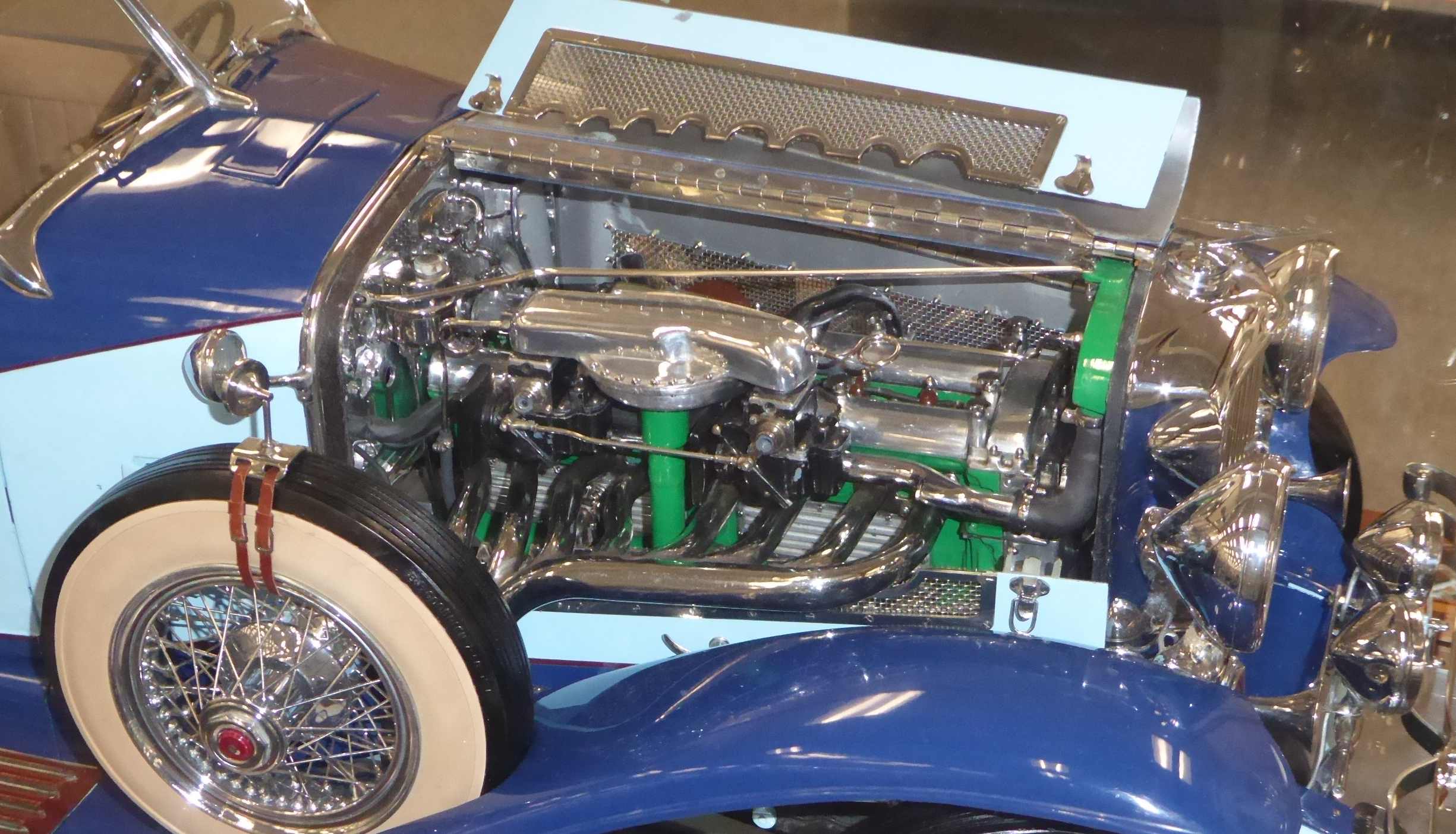
1932 SJ Dusenberg working-engine closeup.

== Machine shop ==
As of 2013 the museum houses a machine shop with a "master machinist".

== Exhibits ==
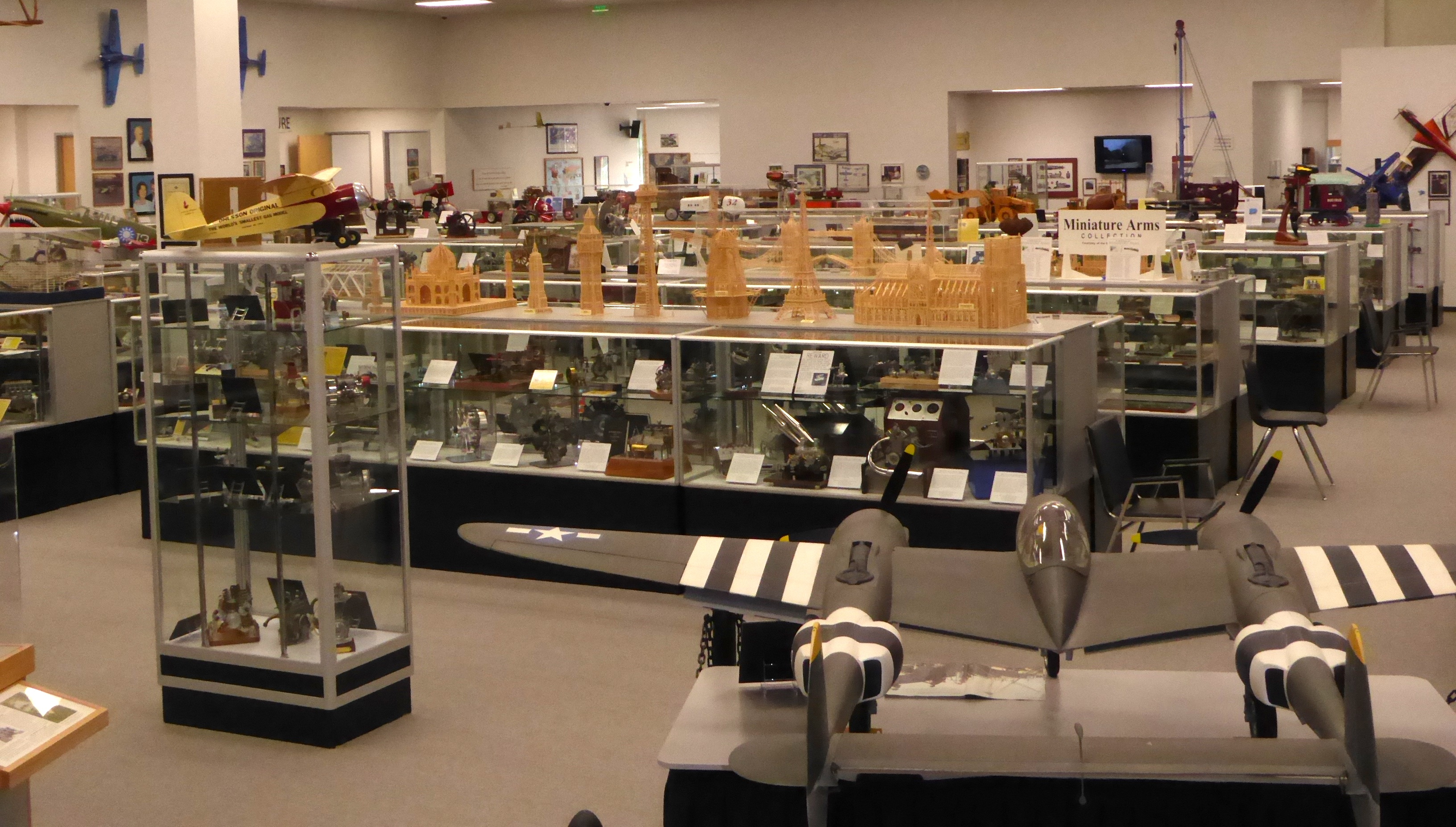
Main exhibit room

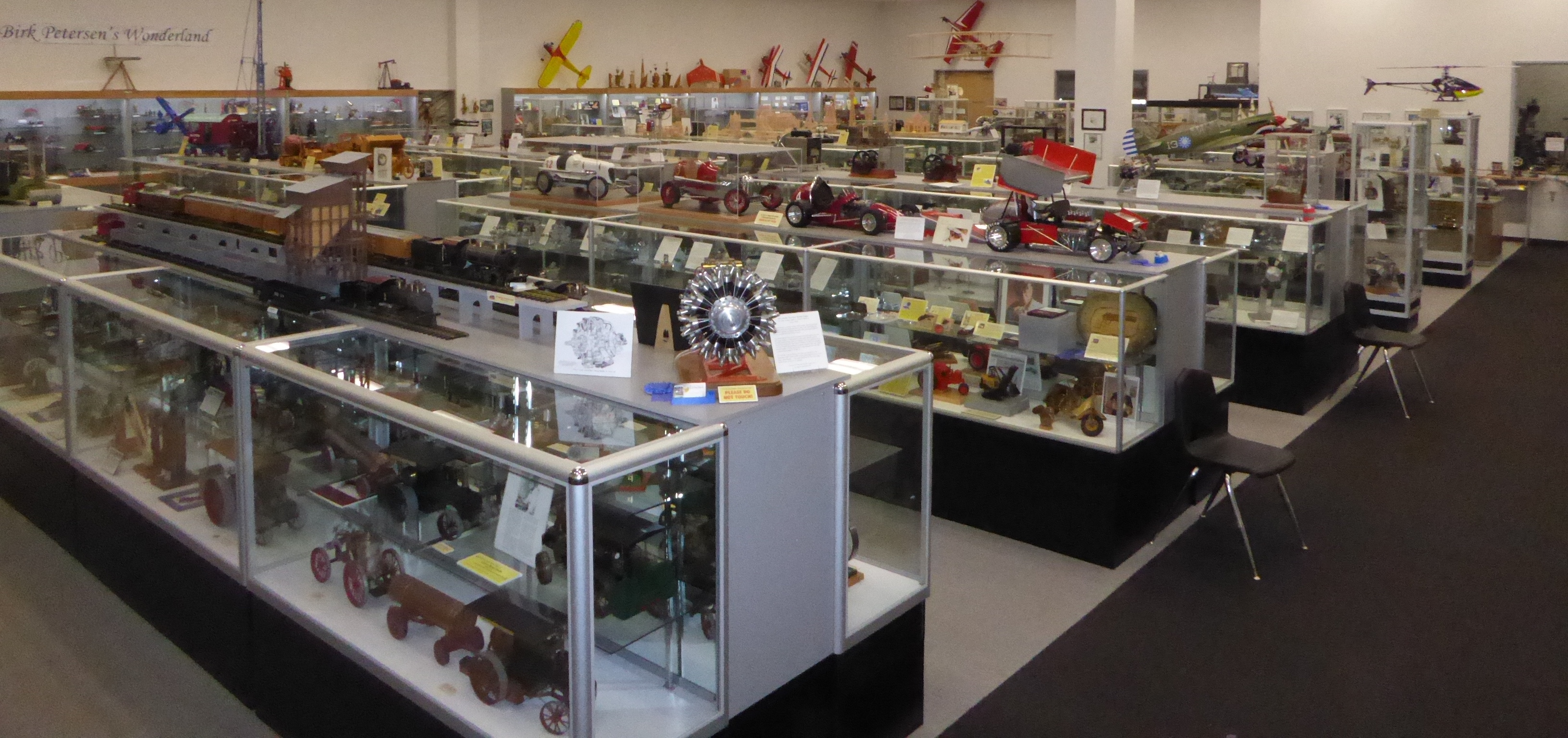
Main exhibit room

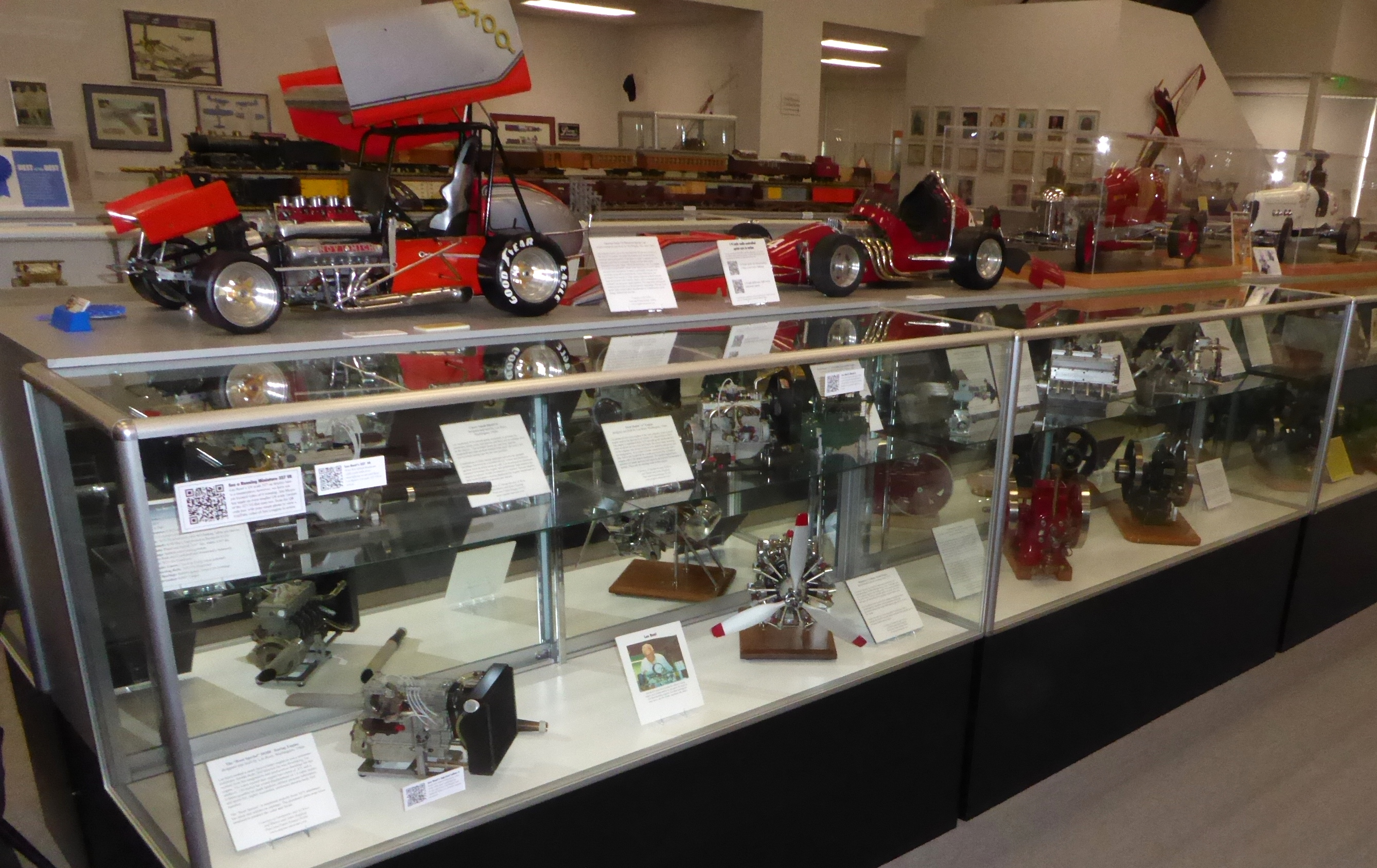
Main exhibit room

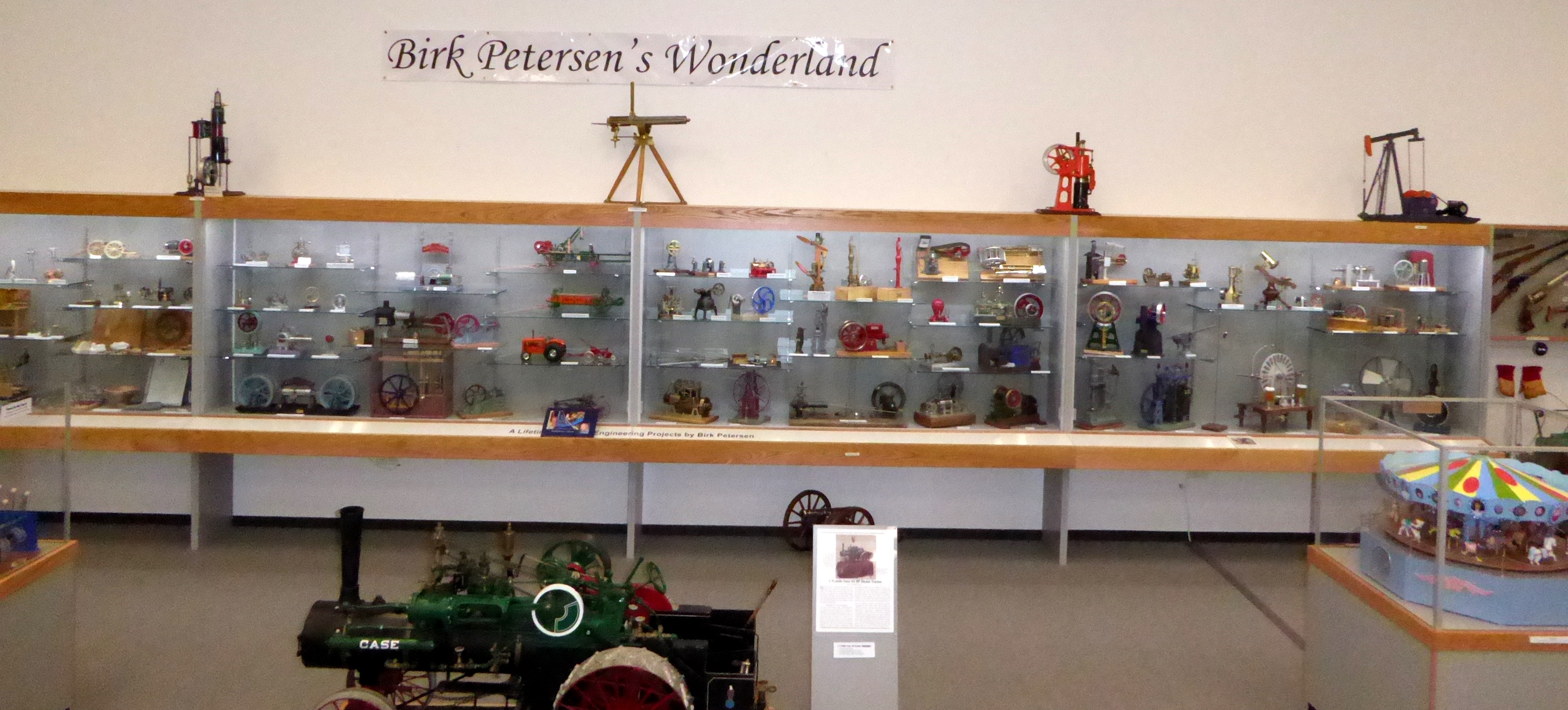
Birk Petersen exhibit

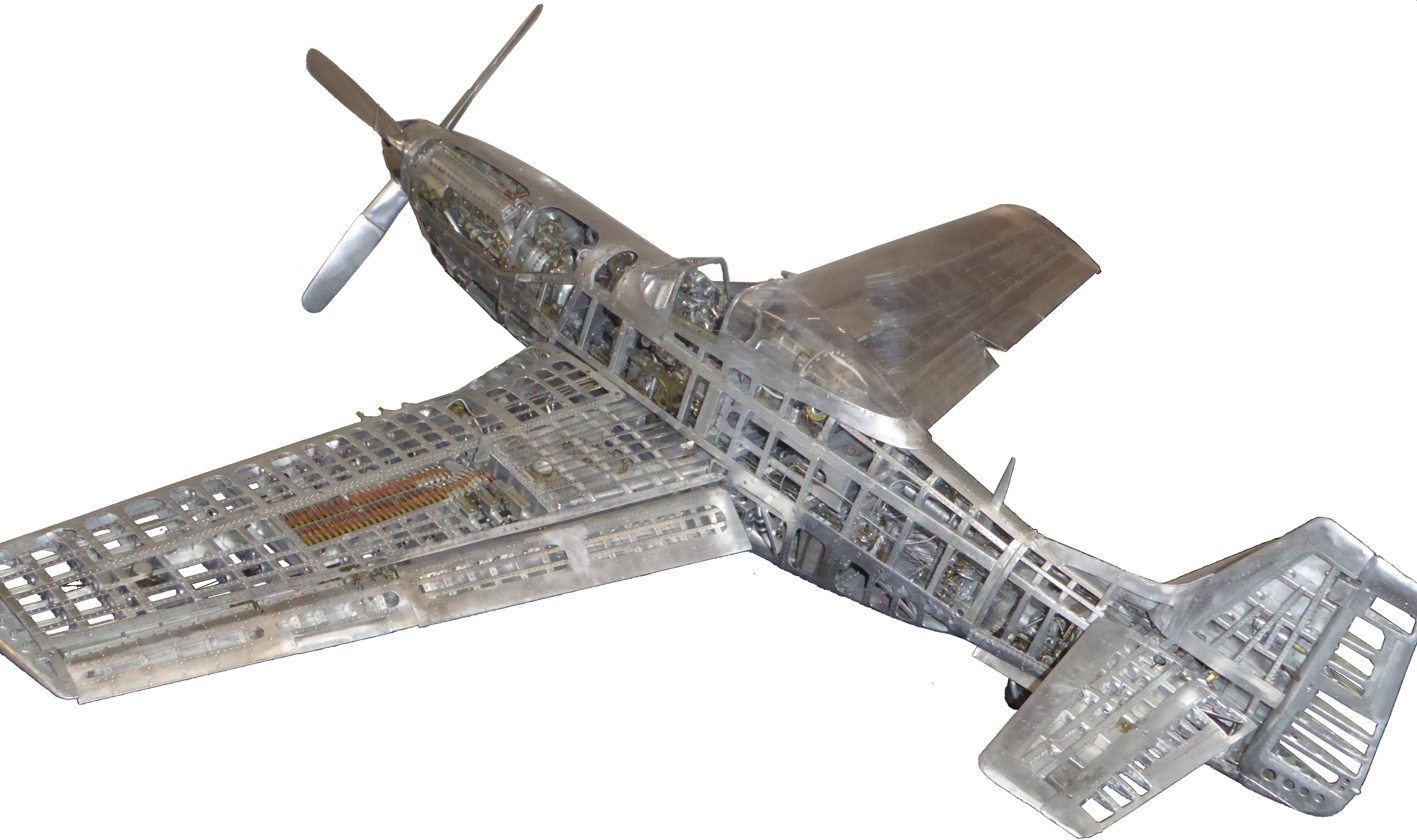
P-51 model 1/16-scale scratch-built by Young C. Park c. 2006

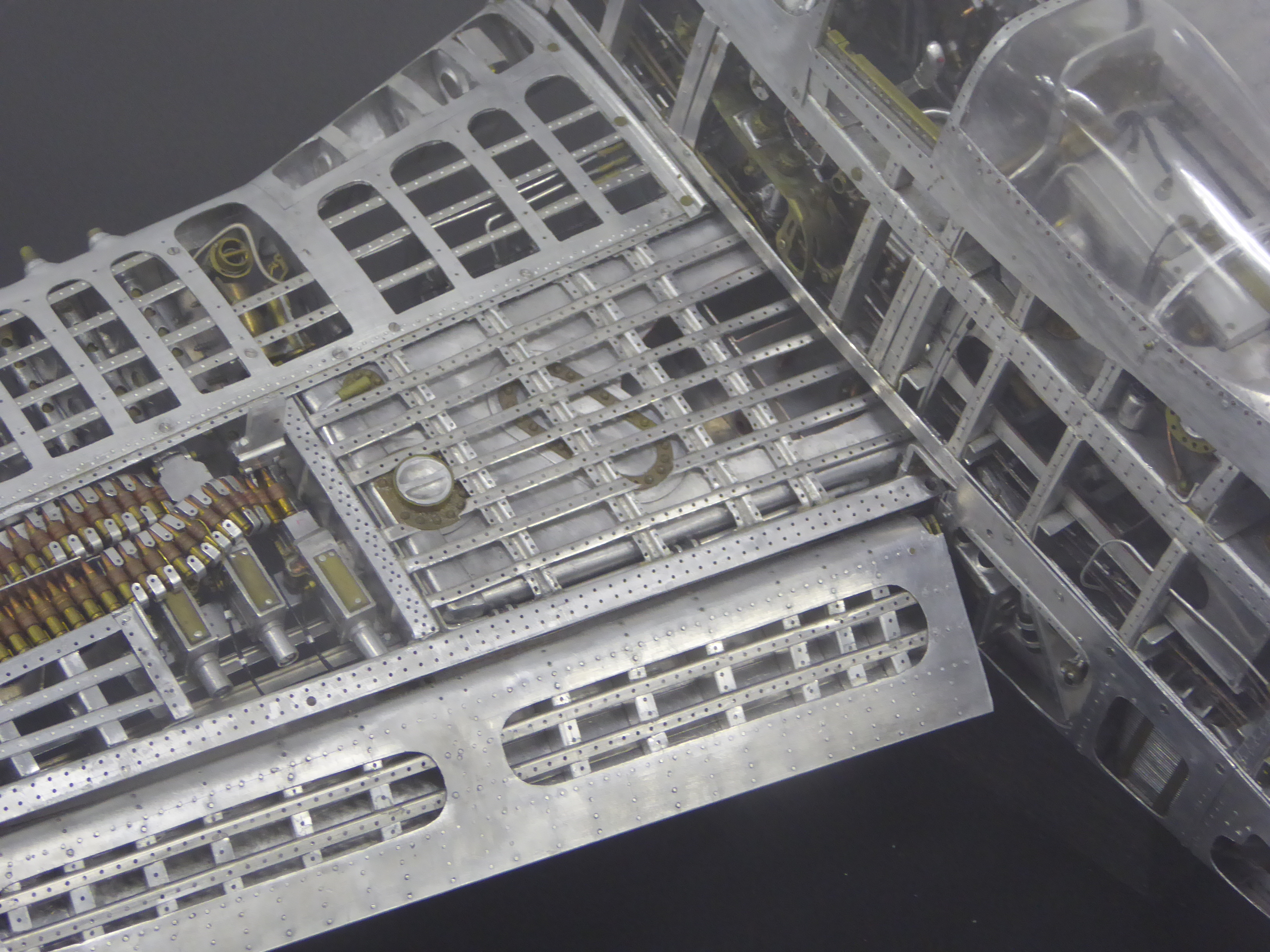
P-51 model 1/16-scale by Young C. Park close-up.

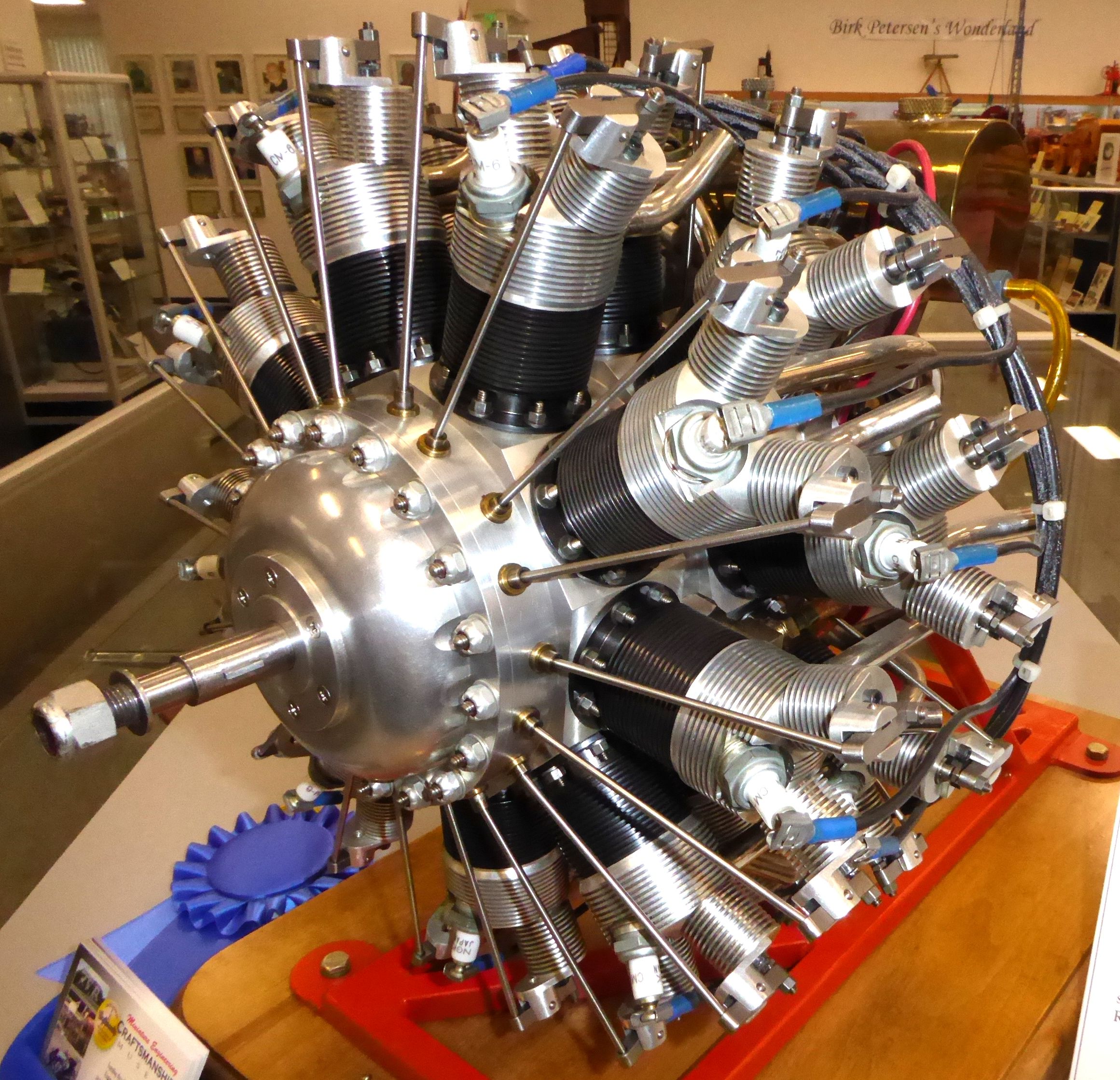
Working 18-cylinder radial engine 1/4-scale by Harold Beckett c. 1995

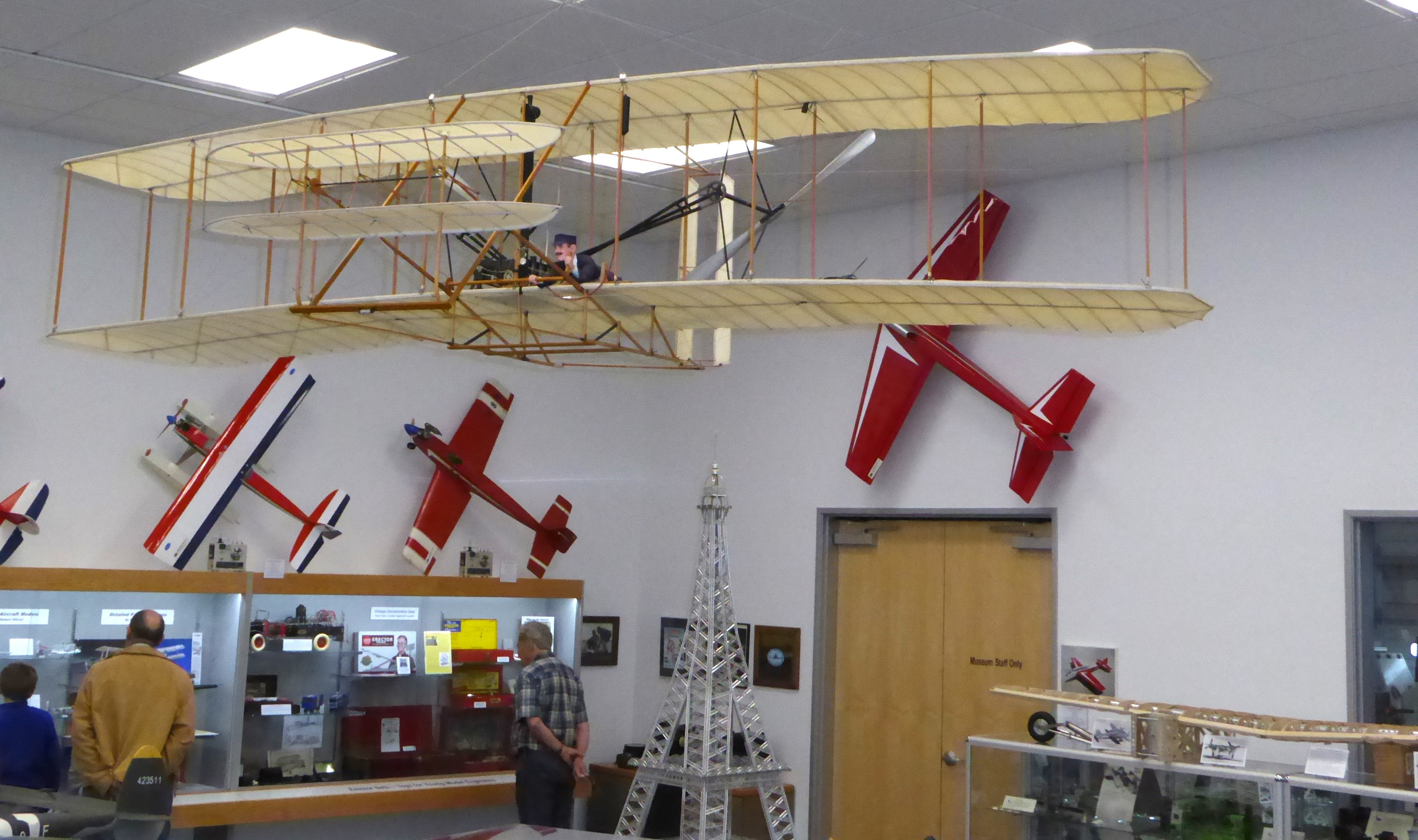
Wright Flyer

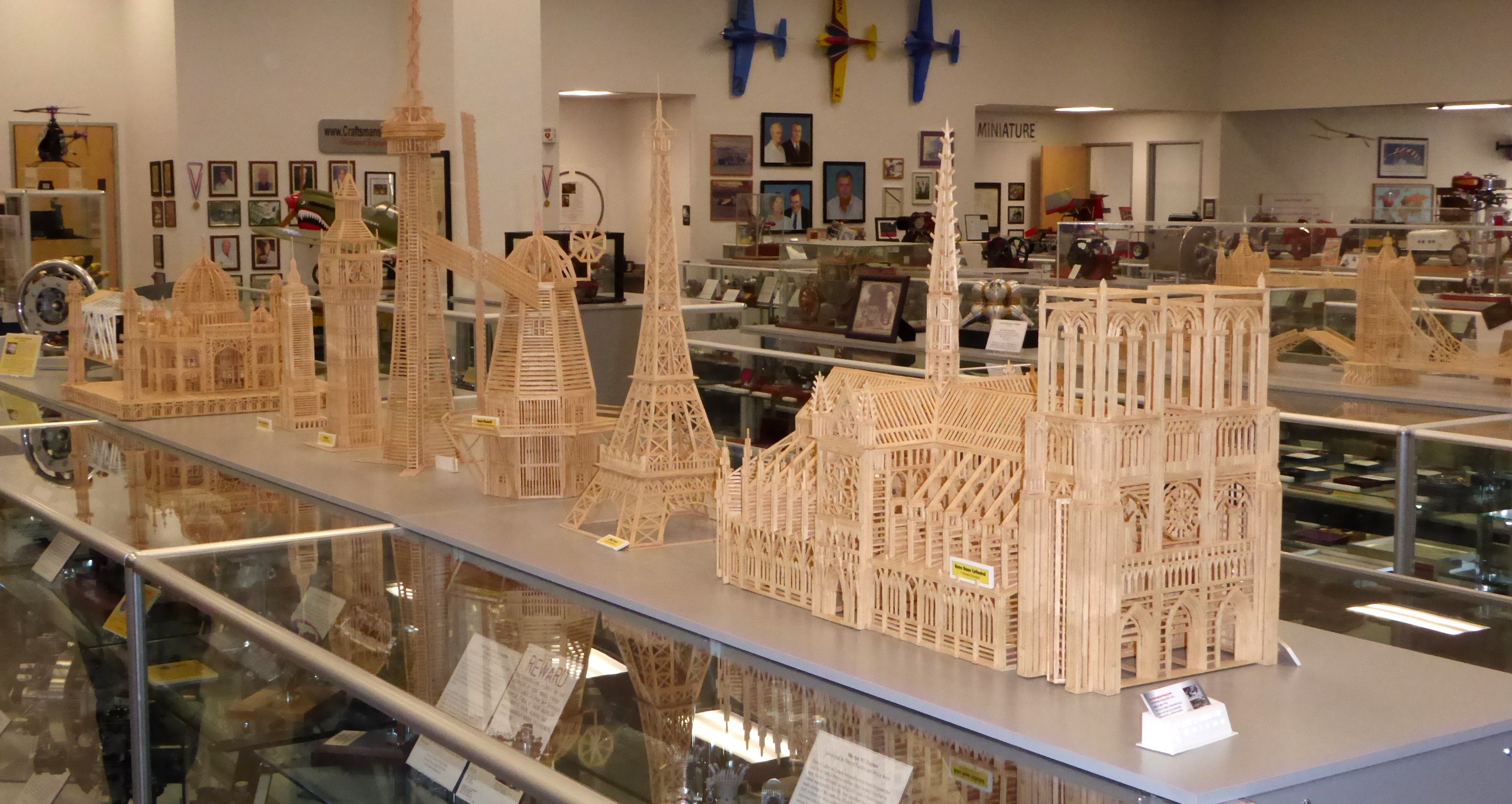
Building and structural models

== History ==
The Joe Martin Foundation for Exceptional Craftsmanship was created in 1997 by Joe Martin, which later went on to create the first iteration of the museum as an online website. In 2006 the first physical presence was established when Martin converted part of his shop to a public museum, and in 2011 the museum was moved to its current location in Carlsbad. Within 4 years, the museum outgrew the factory space and Joe decided to create the Joe Martin Foundation to purchase a 16,000 square foot building in the Raceway industrial park as a permanent home for the museum in Carlsbad, just a couple miles from the Sherline factory. Over the years the museum has expanded its collection of exhibits to include hundreds of working models of all types of miniature machines, engines, architecture, automobiles, and airplanes as well as one-off unique articles of miniature engineering craftsmanship such as a 0.010” diameter bolt with matching nut.
