= Carlsbad Unified School District =

Public school district in Carlsbad, California, United States

Address
- 6225 El Camino Real Carlsbad, California, 92009; United States

District information
- Type: Public
- Grades: K–12
- NCES District ID: 0607500

Students and staff
- Students: 10,863
- Teachers: 476.45 (FTE)
- Staff: 450.5 (FTE)
- Student–teacher ratio: 22.8

Other information
- Website: www.carlsbadusd.net

Carlsbad Unified School District is a school district based in Carlsbad, California. The district manages two high schools, three middle schools and nine elementary schools. In addition they operate two alternative schools. The superintendent is Andrea Norman.

== Schools ==
=== High schools ===
- Carlsbad High School (CHS)
- Sage Creek High School

=== Middle schools ===
- Aviara Oaks Middle School (AOMS)
- Calavera Hills Middle School
- Valley Middle School

=== Elementary schools ===
- Aviara Oaks Elementary School (AOE)
- Buena Vista Elementary School
- Calavera Hills Elementary School
- Hope Elementary School
- Jefferson Elementary School
- Kelly Elementary School
- Magnolia Elementary School
- Pacific Rim Elementary School
- Poinsettia Elementary School

=== Alternative schools ===
- Carlsbad Village Academy
- Carlsbad Seaside Academy

== 2010 shooting ==
On October 8, 2010, Brendan O'Rourke, 41, jumped over a fence and opened fire with a revolver on the playground of Kelly Elementary School. Two girls, 6 and 7, were grazed in the arms. A construction worker then knocked the shooter down with his truck. O'Rourke was sentenced to 168 years to life in prison on multiple charges of attempted premeditated murder and assault.
