= Carlsbad State Beach =

Protected beach in Southern California, USA

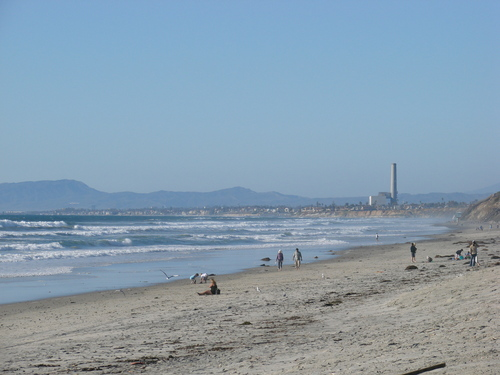
- Carlsbad State Beach

- Location within California Location within the United States
- Location: San Diego County, California, United States
- Nearest city: Carlsbad, California
- Coordinates: 33°8′50″N 117°20′45″W
- Area: 44 acres (18 ha)
- Established: 1933
- Governing body: California Department of Parks and Recreation

Carlsbad State Beach is a protected beach in the state park system of California, United States, located in Carlsbad. It is a San Diego County beach with coastal bluffs. Popular activities include swimming, surfing and bodyboarding several nearby breaks, scuba diving, fishing, and beachcombing.

Many visitors camp on the campsites on top of the cliffs. Access to the beach is through the multiple staircases and also one ramp. There are 220 campsites total. Amenities include showers, bathrooms, electricity, water, Wi-Fi, and a camp store. The 44-acre (18 ha) park was established in 1933.

== See also ==
- List of beaches in California
- List of California state parks
  - List of California State Beaches

| To the North: Carlsbad City Beach | California State Beaches | To the South; South Carlsbad State Beach |
