= Sage Creek High School =

Coordinates: 33°9′27.78″N 117°17′8.44″W

Location
- 3900 Bobcat Blvd; Carlsbad, California, 92010; United States

Information
- Type: Public school (government funded), STEM
- Motto: "Be Your BEST!"
- Established: 2013
- School district: Carlsbad Unified School District
- Principal: Joshua Way
- Staff: 56.63 (FTE)
- Grades: 9–12
- Enrollment: 1,358 (2023-2024)
- Student to teacher ratio: 23.98
- Campus: Suburban
- Colors: Green, Gold, White and Black
- Athletics: CIF San Diego Section, Avocado East League
- Mascot: Bobcat
- Team name: Bobcats
- Newspaper: The Sage
- Website: https://schs.carlsbadusd.net

Sage Creek High School is a public high school in Carlsbad, California, United States. It opened in the fall of 2013. Sage Creek specializes in the STEM fields and was created to alleviate growing enrollment at Carlsbad High School. Although the school is public, a lottery for admission is held if a class reaches a certain threshold.

== Campus ==
Sage Creek is a verified CHPS school, this means the school includes many renewable materials, water, and electricity saving technologies. The roughly 40-acre campus cost over $100 million to build, and includes 3 parking lots, 4 academic buildings, and several sport courts. A 17,500 square foot Performing Arts Center (PAC) opened in June 2018.

== Achievements, awards, distinctions ==
The California Interscholastic Federation (CIF) is the governing body for high school sports in California.

=== Men's Cross Country ===
- 2016 - Boys' Cross Country Team received 2nd in the California State CIF Championship division 4.

=== Women's Cross Country ===
- 2018 - Girls' Cross Country Team received 1st in the California State CIF Championship division 4.

=== Men's Volleyball ===
- 2017 - State Championship - Boys' Volleyball California Regional CIF Division 3. Carlsbad's First State Champion in any sport

=== Surf ===
- 2016 - Surf Team won their division taking a 4–0 undefeated season victory.

=== Project Design Awards ===
- 2013 ABC, Award of Excellence
- 2013 ENR California Best Project Award, K-12 category
- 2013 AGC Build San Diego Merit Award, Excellence in Sustainable Project category
- 2014 ASCE, Award of Excellence, Land Development
- 2014 APWA, Project of the Year for Structures, Sustainable/Green and Projects More than $75 Million

=== Science Olympiad ===
- 2016 10th place in San Diego Regional Science Olympiad Competition
- 2017 7th place in San Diego Regional Science Olympiad Competition
- 2019 5th place in San Diego Regional Science Olympiad Competition

=== Robotics ===
Sage Creek has four award-winning FTC teams. They are Botcats, LevelUp 9261, Crow Force 5, and Python. In 2022, three would compete in the San Diego regional tournament which is equivalent to a state or national level tournament.

== STEM ==
Sage Creek has programs in the STEM fields, including four-year Biomedical and Engineering strands through Project Lead the Way. Sage Creek was recognized as PLTW Distinguished High School in 2022.
