= Gregory R Nelson Sr. =

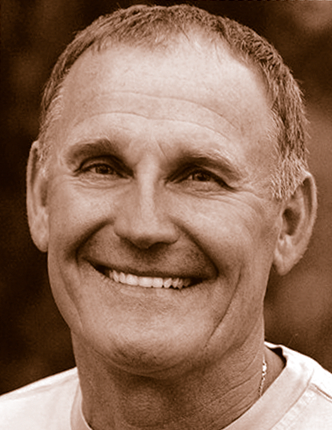
Image of Gregory R Nelson Sr

Gregory Roy Nelson Sr. is the cofounder and former senior executive at three of the nation’s leading orthopedic bracing companies, DonJoy, Inc. (now DJO Global), BREG, Inc, and United Orthopedic Group.

== Business/career ==
Nelson cofounded DonJoy, Inc. a company that manufactures and sells orthopedic devices, in 1977. The company eventually was traded on the New York Stock Exchange as DJO. It remains the world’s largest manufacturer of knee braces. The vastly successful company was sold in 1987 for $23 million. Nelson remained president until 1995. DJO Global currently is a private company, owned by the Blackstone Group. In 1989, Nelson cofounded BREG, another orthopedic company that achieved landmark success. BREG was sold in 2003 for $150 million. For the next few years, Nelson concentrated on other business opportunities and on philanthropic, faith-based, and community enhancement efforts.

In 2007, Greg Roy Nelson became chairman and CEO of United Orthopedic Group, a corporation specializing in non-invasive orthopedic products and services that he co-founded with Essex Woodlands Health Ventures. Growing through a strategic combination of acquisitions and organic growth, the company operated two divisions: a medical brands division, Medical Technology; and a service division, Viscent Orthopedic Solutions, LLC. Both divisions grew steadily in revenue. By 2012, Viscent had more than 23 operating locations stretching from the Atlantic to the Pacific.

In late 2014, Nelson was instrumental in effecting a merger between UOG and BREG. Nelson is currently semi-retired. He remains active in his community, church and business affairs. In addition to his significant contributions to the orthopedic industry, which he made sans medical background, Nelson has made contributions to his community. Gregorio's, an Italian restaurant owned by Nelson and located in Carlsbad, California, donated 100% of profits to the Boys & Girls Clubs of Carlsbad for three calendar years; from 2010 to 2013.

== Recent endeavors ==
Nelson was named the City of Carlsbad’s inaugural “Citizen of the Year” in 1991 and the Carlsbad Chamber of Commerce’s “Philanthropist of the Year” in 2006.

In the mid-2000s, Nelson and his wife, Barbi, were co-chairs of the Boys & Girls Clubs of Carlsbad capital campaign to build a second Carlsbad Clubhouse. In 2004, Nelson personally donated $1 million to kickstart the project; that currently marks the largest donation in Club history. The Bressi Ranch Clubhouse opened in 2013. In recognition of his significant contributions in terms of time and money over several decades, the gymnasiums at both Clubhouses were named in his honor.

In 2008, Nelson was inducted into the Boys & Girls Clubs of America Alumni Hall of Fame, joining the likes of fellow inductees Steve Young and Steve Largent, actors Cuba Gooding, Jr. and Danny Glover, former Los Angeles Mayor Antonio Villaraigosa, Starbucks CEO Howard Schultz, and actress/singer Dana Owens (aka Queen Latifah). In 2015, 50 years after being named the Carlsbad Club's "Boy of the Year" in 1965, Nelson was invited to help the organization establish a National Alumni Association. He first became a Carlsbad Club member at age nine, and later served as executive director, board president and lifetime honorary board member.

== Books ==
In 2006, Nelson published half time, a book of poetry on the subjects of winning attitudes, thankfulness, family, children, love, and God. The book is a compilation of poems he had written over many years.

In 2014, Nelson commissioned and served as editor-in-chief of Over 75,000 Served … a Chronicle of the Boys & Girls Clubs of Carlsbad. The coffee-table-style book features historical photos and first-person accounts of people involved with the club since its inception in 1952.

In 2015, Nelson published SHIRTS & SKINS … Teaming up for success, in business and in life. The autobiographical career retrospective reveals how this self-made entrepreneur teamed up with great players to attain success in the worldwide medical orthopedics industry. It includes coaching notes intended to guide readers toward effective leadership.
