= Morgan Cathey =

American soccer player

Personal information
- Full name: Morgan Henry Cathey
- Date of birth: June 12, 1984 (age 42)
- Place of birth: Alameda County, California, United States
- Position: Goalkeeper

Youth career
- 2003–2005: La Costa Canyon Mavericks

College career
Years	Team	Apps	(Gls)
2005–2006	Azusa Pacific Cougars		

Senior career*
Years	Team	Apps	(Gls)
2004–2005	Cascade Surge		
2006–2007	HSC Bulls		
2007–2009	Ajax Cape Town		
2009	Ikapa Sporting		

Managerial career
- 2004–2006: Glendora Tartans
- 2009–2010: Ambassadors FC
- 2011: 11 Express
- 2010–2011: Hanover Park
- 2011–2012: Stanislaus State Warriors (asst.)
- 2013–2019: Whitworth Pirates
- 2020–2022: Stanislaus State Warriors
- 2022–: Westmont Warriors
- * Club domestic league appearances and goals

Morgan Henry Cathey (born June 12, 1984) is an American retired soccer player who is currently the head men's soccer coach at Westmont College. Cathey played for Ikapa Sporting in the South African National First Division.

Cathey attended Azusa Pacific University in Azusa, California. He obtained a BA in Youth Ministries in 2006. After a year of interning at a high school group at Pomona First Baptist Church, California, Morgan and his wife Cari left for South Africa. While in South Africa, Morgan and Cari worked with the ministry Ambassadors in Sport. He also was a volunteer guest-speaker at St John's Church youth group in South Africa. Cathey held the position of Assistant Men's Soccer Coach at California State University Stanislaus.

Cathey joined the Westmont Warriors as head coach in December 2022.

== Career ==
Cathey spent the 2007–2008 season at Premier Soccer League club Ajax Cape Town as a backup to Hans Vonk. He made his debut for Ajax as a second-half substitute in a league match against Wits University FC on October 31, 2007.

In January 2020, it was announced that Cathey would be leaving Whitworth University to rejoin the Stanislaus State Warriors. He led the Whitworth Pirates to a Northwest Conference (D3) conference championship in his second season, and a trip to the Sweet 16. Cathey's Pirates have won the last three Northwest Conference titles. He recently graduated his first class of recruits.
