= Tai Collins =

American actress

Tanquil "Tai" Lisa Collins is a model, actress, screenwriter, producer, philanthropist, and former Miss Virginia USA (1983).

== Biography ==
Tai Collins co-created and was the lead writer and Show-runner behind SAF3 (pronounced "Safe"), the only independently produced, one-hour action/drama television series to reach primetime on an American broadcast network - an achievement unmatched since the 1970s. She Executive Produced 22 hours of the first-run syndicated series airing in 66 countries worldwide from 2013 to 2018 and currently streaming on Amazon Prime. The action drama is about a division of the Malibu Fire Department consisting of men and women who serve in the field of Sea, Air, Fire Emergency. She is one of the few women in television to create and executive produce their own series.

Her television credits include writing for and acting on Baywatch. She also wrote NYPD Blue, Poltergeist: The Legacy, Fame LA, The Pretender, and She Spies. Her feature film Finding Home won an Angel Award for "Best Drama" at the 2013 Monaco International Film Festival. In 2022, she wrote a fire rescue series pilot for Netflix.

Collins is the co-founder and executive director of A Chance for Children Foundation. Founded in 1992, the foundations mission is to empower at-risk youth.

Collins was honored in 1999 with a humanitarian award alongside Kofi Annan and Al Gore. In 2001, she received a Resolution by the Assembly of the State of California for her on-going work with "at risk" youth in South Los Angeles. W.O.M.E.N. of Los Angeles honored her with their first Lynne Weaver Mentoring Award in 2005. In 2010 her lifetime work was honored when she was invited by the United Nations to be a part of the Women in the World Making Change Summit. In 2011, she received numerous recognitions including; a Commendation from the City of Los Angeles for her service and support of the Los Angeles Police Department Southeast Division Jeopardy Program; a Certificate of Recognition by the California State Legislature for her community service to the city of Los Angeles; and the prestigious Women in History Award by the California State Assembly. In 2012, Collins was honored by the Los Angeles Dodgers with a "Go to Bat Award" for going to bat for inner city children in Los Angeles. LA Family Housing Homeless shelters honored her with a Dream Builder Award in 2013 for her over twenty years of service to homeless children and families. In 2013, Collins was the recipient of the California Peace Officers Association's Certificate of Appreciation. The award is presented to an individual outside of the law enforcement for an action that enhances Peace and the law enforcement profession. In March 2024, she was honored by Reimagine LA for Women's History Month alongside Congresswoman Maxine Waters, LAPD Deputy Chef Emada Tingirides and former Secretary of the Treasury Rosario Marin.

TODAY and Al Roker chose Collins' charity as the Lend a Hand Charity of the Year 2012 featuring them on the show. Al Roker said: "In all of my years dealing with charities, I have never seen one as special as this."

A Chance for Children Free Libraries provide access to free books for children and have been established in over 40 locations around the city of Los Angeles at various locations including LAPD lobbies, the Torrance PD and Pasadena PD lobby. The libraries have expanded into LA Sheriff Department lobbies with four in the works. The libraries are registered with the Little Free Libraries and have been honored by them with a "Library of Distinction" Award. A Chance for Children has partnered with the Water Buffalo Club and several girl scout and boy scout troops to bring these libraries to life.

A Chance for Children Foundation works closely with the LAPD, LA Fire Department, US Coast Guard, Los Angeles County Lifeguards agencies and Housing Authority of the City of Los Angeles (HACLA).

In 2013, Collins and her then partner (now husband) Gregory J. Bonann, started A Chance for Children South Africa. They work with children in the Gugulethu township in Cape Town and partner with Youth Potential South Africa in the De Rust area, Western Cape Province.

MSNBC featured Collins in a piece called "The God Mother of Hollywood."

Collins serves as vice president on the board of Sunburst Youth Challenge Academy, a program run by the National Guard that intervenes and reclaims lives of 16 to 18 year old at-risk high school students; to produce program graduates with the values, life skills, education and self discipline to succeed as productive citizens.

She is also serves on the board of Shoes That Fit, a non-profit foundation whose mission is giving children in need new athletic shoes to attend school with dignity and joy, prepared to learn, play, and thrive as well as Operation Progress seeing inner city youth through from kindergarten to college.

In 1991, Collins appeared on the cover of Playboy Magazine.

Preceded by Sondra Dee Jones	Miss Virginia USA; 1983	Succeeded by Leah Rush
