= List of She Spies episodes =

The following is a list of episodes for the television show She Spies. The show was created by NBC advertising executives, Vince Manze and Joe Livecchi.

== Series overview ==
Season	Episodes	Originally released	
Season	Episodes	First released	Last released
1	20	July 20, 2002	May 10, 2003
2	20	September 20, 2003	May 15, 2004

== Episodes ==
=== Season 1 (2002–03) ===
No. overall	No. in season	Title	Directed by	Written by	Original release date
1	1	"First Episode"	Michael Zinberg	Ron Osborn & Jeff Reno & David Misch	July 20, 2002
Barry Bostwick guest starred in this episode.
2	2	"The Martini Shot"	John Kretchmer	Josh Appelbaum & André Nemec	July 27, 2002
3	3	"Poster Girl"	Bethany Rooney	Steven Long Mitchell & Craig W Van Sickle	August 3, 2002
Last episode to air on NBC.
4	4	"Daddy's Girl"	George Verschoor	Jack Bernstein & David Misch & Blake and Blaine Devoroe	September 28, 2002
5	5	"Fondles"	John Kretchmer	Ron Osborn & Jeff Reno & Blake & Blaine Devoroe	October 19, 2002
6	6	"Ice Man"	Bethany Rooney	Mark Dodson	October 26, 2002
Ventriloquist Jeff Dunham makes a guest appearance.
7	7	"Three Women and a Baby"	Krishna Rao	Ron Osborn & Jeff Reno	November 2, 2002
8	8	"Trap"	Gregory J. Bonann	Jack Bernstein & David Misch & Gene Laufenberg	November 9, 2002
9	9	"Spies vs. Spy"	Rick Jacobson	Story by : Joe Livecchi & Michael Loprete and Josh Appelbaum & André Nemec; Teleplay by : Joe Livecchi & Michael Loprete	November 16, 2002
Ventriloquist Jeff Dunham makes a guest appearance.
10	10	"Perilyzed"	Tom DeSimone	Gene Laufenberg	November 30, 2002
11	11	"Betrayal"	Krishna Rao	David Misch	January 11, 2003
Was to have aired on November 23, 2002, prior to "Perilyzed", but was postponed and a rerun of "Poster Girl" aired instead.
12	12	"The Girl With the Broken Heart"	Jefferson Kibbee	Christopher Painter	January 25, 2003
Henstridge's real life fiancé, Liam Waite, played a role on this episode.
13	13	"You Don't Know Jack"	Ron Osborn	David Misch & Ron Osborn	February 1, 2003
14	14	"First Date"	Bethany Rooney	Jack Bernstein	February 8, 2003
15	15	"While You Were Out"	Rick Jacobson	David Misch	February 15, 2003
16	16	"Daze of Future Past"	Gregory J. Bonann	Story by : Mark Dodson & Ethan Lawrence; Teleplay by : Mark Dodson	April 12, 2003
Was originally named "About Last Night".
17	17	"The Replacement"	David Karl Calloway	Gene Laufenberg	April 19, 2003
Jeffrey Combs guest starred in this episode.
18	18	"Damsels in De-Stress"	Gregory J. Bonann	Christopher Painter	April 26, 2003
19	19	"Learning to Fly"	Rick Rosenthal	Jack Bernstein	May 3, 2003
Was supposed to have aired early in the season's run, but was postponed several times.
20	20	"We'll Be Right Back"	Jeff Reno	Jeff Reno	May 10, 2003
Season finale. Last episode with Carlos Jacott as Jack Wilde. The actor left the show at the end of the season.

=== Season 2 (2003–04) ===
No. overall	No. in season	Title	Directed by	Written by	Original release date
21	1	"Rane of Terror"	Gregory J. Bonann	Tony Blake & Paul Jackson	September 20, 2003
Cameron Daddo and Jamie Iglehart debut in the show; first appearance of the "Chairman" who had been mentioned throughout season one; opening credits gone.
22	2	"Last Man Standing"	Reza Badiyi	Alan Cross	September 27, 2003
23	3	"Manhunt"	Rick Jacobson	Jennifer Furlong	October 4, 2003
24	4	"Gone Bad"	Jefferson Kibbee	Robin Bernheim	October 11, 2003
Cassie and D.D. suspect Shane has gone back to her stealing ways, threatening the She Spies program.
25	5	"Date to Mate"	Gregory J. Bonann	Steven L. Sears	October 18, 2003
26	6	"Crossed Out"	Chuck Bowman	Lee Goldberg & William Rabkin	October 25, 2003
The "Chairman" is killed off the show.
27	7	"Cover Me"	Reza Badiyi	Gene Miller	November 1, 2003
Guest appearance by Jennifer Siebel, later fiancée of San Francisco mayor Gavin Newsom. The team mourns when Cassie's killed in a bus accident but is shocked when she turns up alive. They discover a small time criminal had plastic surgery to look like her and they set out to discover why.
28	8	"Love Kills"	Oley Sassone	Michael Gleason	November 8, 2003
Jason Carter, from Babylon 5, makes a guest appearance on this episode.
29	9	"Off With Her Head"	Gregory J. Bonann	Josef Anderson	November 15, 2003
30	10	"Message from Kassar"	Reza Badiyi	Alan Cross	November 22, 2003
31	11	"Spies Gone Wild"	Gregory J. Bonann	Robin Bernheim	January 17, 2004
Title for the episode is a pun on the popular adult videos Girls Gone Wild.
32	12	"The White Chollima"	Rick Jacobson	Tony Blake & Paul Jackson	January 24, 2004
33	13	"Leotards and Lies"	Oley Sassone	Jennifer Furlong	January 31, 2004
Jeff Conaway, from Babylon 5, makes a guest appearance on this episode.
34	14	"Family Reunion"	Chuck Bowman	Steven L. Sears	February 7, 2004
35	15	"The Gift"	Rick Jacobson	Jim Novack	February 14, 2004
36	16	"London Calling"	Alan J. Levi	Alan Cross	February 21, 2004
Episode title after the 1979 album by punk rock band The Clash.
37	17	"Stranded"	Rick Jacobson	Robin Bernheim	April 24, 2004
38	18	"Witness Protection"	Gregory J. Bonann	Tanquil Lisa Collins	May 1, 2004
Mark Humphrey guest stars in this episode. (A clip episode.)
39	19	"Wedding of the Century"	Gregory J. Bonann	Jennifer Furlong	May 8, 2004
Episode makes many references to the movie Fatal Attraction.
40	20	"Remember When"	Pat Duffy	Tony Blake & Paul Jackson	May 15, 2004
Series finale. Last episode produced. The show was cancelled after season two.
