= Karl Otto Thaning =

South African actor and former professional swimmer and water polo player

Karl Thaning
Personal information
- Full name: Karl Thaning
- National team: South Africa
- Born: 9 May 1977 (age 49) Cape Town, South Africa
- Height: 1.88 m (6 ft 2 in)

Sport
- Sport: Swimming
- Strokes: Freestyle

Karl Thaning (born 9 May 1977) is a South African actor and former international swimmer and water polo player. As a swimmer he most notably competed in the 2004 Summer Olympics in Athens. As an actor, he has appeared in a number of films and television series.

== Early life ==
Thaning attended Diocesan College in Cape Town then, the University of the Pacific in Stockton, California, graduating with a degree in theatre and film.

== Acting career ==
Thaning began acting in 2002, and has appeared in numerous television shows and films since then. He played Captain Phillip Brooks in the seven-part 2008 South African miniseries Feast of the Uninvited. He also acted in international films, such as the 2010 Winnie, which starred Jennifer Hudson, and the 2012 film Dredd, in which he played Judge Chan. Other characters portrayed by him include O'Malley in Black Sails, Jared Taylor in SAF3 and First Mate Warren in Outlander.

== Athletic career ==
Thaning represented his country in two sports, playing water polo for South Africa at the Heliopolis Tournament in Cairo, Egypt in 2003, and later for swimming at numerous tournaments.

As a swimmer, Thaning specialized in freestyle events. He claimed numerous short-course South African titles in sprint freestyle (both 50 and 100).

Thaning competed in the men's 4 × 100 m medley relay, as a member of the South African team, at the 2004 Summer Olympics in Athens., teaming with Gerhard Zandberg, Terence Parkin, and Eugene Botes in heat two, Thaning anchored a freestyle leg to finish the race with a split of 49.25, with the team finishing thirteenth overall in a final time of 3:43.94.

He has four Big West Conference Champion Titles from 1999 to 2000 in California, USA, and swam Mare Nostrum in 2004 and 2005 in Monte Carlo, Canet, and Barcelona. He won the 50 metre Freestyle at the Israeli National Championships at the Windgate Institute in Netanya, Israel, and won three races in the Flanders Grand Prix in Brugge, Belgium, and swam in the Sydney, Australia and Daejon, South Korea, legs of the World Cup. In 2006, he placed 2nd in the 50 metre Freestyle at the Copenhagen Skins Invite in Denmark, and swam another World Cup leg in Berlin, Germany.

He captained the National Aquatic Team at the Commonwealth Games in Melbourne, Australia in 2006, during which he finished 9th in the 50 meter freestyle and anchored the freestyle leg of the men's 4 × 100 m medley relay to a 6th-place finish.

Thaning also represented South Africa playing waterpolo In Budapest, Hungary and Lodz, Poland in 1996 for the under 20 Team, and played at the World Aquatics U20 Water Polo Championships in Havana, Cuba in 1997. He played for the University of the Pacific's Mens Team in the Big West Conference in 1999 and 2000, and at the US Nationals in Oahu, Hawaii. He represented the South African Mens National Team at the Heliopolis Tournament in Cairo, Egypt in 2003.

He was an NCAA Academic All American in 1999 and 2000 and is a letterman recipient.
