= SAF3 =

- Also known as: Rescue 3
- Genre: Action-drama
- Created by: Gregory J. Bonann; Tai Collins
- Directed by: Gregory J. Bonann; Gary Capo; Phil Scarpaci; Casey Brown; Dave Keffer; Eric Locko
- Starring: Dolph Lundgren; J. R. Martinez; Texas Battle; Lydia Hull; Katie Meehan; Travis Burns; Danielle Anderson; Karl Thaning; Jocelyn Osorio; Pia Lamberg
- Country of origin: United States
- Original language: English
- No. of seasons: 1
- No. of episodes: 20

Production
- Production location: South Africa
- Cinematography: Stuart Asbjornsen
- Running time: 43 min
- Production companies: Emmett/Furla Films; Engine Entertainment; Envision Entertainment Company; Tower 18 Production Company; Tower 18, Gregory J. Bonann Productions

Original release
- Network: Syndication
- Release: September 21, 2013 – May 17, 2014

SAF3 (pronounced "Safe"), also known by its working title Rescue 3, is a syndicated American action-drama television series following the daily challenges of the S(Sea), A(Air), and F(Fire) divisions of the Malibu Fire Department. This series consists of 20 episodes that originally ran during the 2013–14 season.

Although this series originated in the United States and is set in California, it was filmed in South African locations such as Cape Town and Camps Bay Beach.

The series received financing from Emmett/Furla Films and Envision Entertainment. Gregory Bonann created the show.

The Star said "the drama is a modern day Baywatch which stars a blend of local and international actors". Cape Argus stated, "SAF3 is a heart-warming series, where the trials and tribulations of the key characters, married with dedication to their jobs, forms the foundation of the drama."

== Cast ==
- Dolph Lundgren as Captain John Eriksson, team leader
- J. R. Martinez as Alfonso Rivera, paramedic firefighter
- Texas Battle as Texas Daly, water rescuer
- Katie Meehan as Charley Frazer, rookie lifeguard
- Lydia Hull as Lily Maddox, firefighter
- Jocelyn Osorio as Graciela Vega, field medic
- Danielle Anderson as Kacie West, John's daughter
- Karl Thaning as Jared Taylor, a pilot
- Pia Lamberg as Heather, a lifeguard
- Chris Fisher as Bryce Elliott, a lifeguard
- Travis Burns as Chase Robertson, a lifeguard

=== Recurring ===
- Kim Engelbrecht as Becca Conners
- Lex King as Lex

== Episodes ==
No.	Title	Directed by	Written by	Original release date
1	"Hero's Last Mission"	Gregory J. Bonann	Gregory J. Bonann, Tai Collins	September 21, 2013
Former Navy SEAL Hal Dunnigan has founded a hand-picked, multi-disciplinary rescue unit based in Malibu, California. During a fire on Catalina Island Dunnigan's team goes in to save a girl scout troop. Refusing to leave one behind, Dunnigan deliberately misses the helicopter extraction window and gets trapped by a crushing tree. His deputy Erickson, also a SEALs veteran, can only save the girl. Back home Erickson leads a memorial diving ceremony for his late friend and takes over command of the unit.
2	"In Remembrance"	Phil Scarpaci	Gregory J. Bonann, Tai Collins	September 28, 2013
Reeling from the loss of their leader, the SAF3 team suffers another major blow when the very existence of the program is questioned by a board of review. Until the outcome is divulged, it is business as usual and the SAF3 team pulls together to make a dramatic car rescue.
3	"Texas in a Bottle"	Gary Capo	Gregory J. Bonann, Tai Collins	October 5, 2013
The investigation into the SAF3 team's actions in the deadly Catalina fire carries on, while Alfonso struggles with his horrific physical injuries and haunting emotional scars. The remainder of the team is put into jeopardy while undertaking a daring underwater rescue.
4	"Under Pressure"	Phil Scarpaci	Ben J. Hashby, Hugo Simpson	October 12, 2013
Confident they will be reinstated after a suspension sentence they feel is unfair, the SAF3 team carries on with their training activities. A drill led by Graciela Vega, a trauma nurse in the Los Angeles forest, turns into a real rescue when the SAF3 team comes across a welder fighting for his life.
5	"Faces"	Gregory J. Bonann	Tai Collins	October 19, 2013
Crushed by the news that SAF3 has been terminated, the team rallies together to overturn the decision. Anxiously awaiting the outcome of their appeal, they focus their energy on supporting Alfonso as he faces a new life after being severely burned.
6	"I Can't Pretend"	Gary Capo	John F. Dilnik	October 26, 2013
After a string of testing events, SAF3 is rewarded with an unexpected posthumous gift from their leader. Graciela must face her greatest fear in a dangerous cliff rescue, while Alfonso struggles to claim his position back on the team.
7	"Unknown Soldier"	Gregory J. Bonann	Davey Lovejoy	November 2, 2013
A paddling row turns into a dangerous encounter for two SAF3 members when they are held captive by an unstable ex-soldier.
8	"Vigilance"	Gary Capo	Paul Jackson	November 9, 2013
Each SAF3 member's area of expertise and resilience is put to the test when they are called to a hazardous underground rescue involving the deadly effects of a poisonous gas. Meanwhile, Charley gets herself noticed for her consistent rescue work along Malibu beach.
9	"Training Day"	Gregory J. Bonann	Hans Rodionoff	November 16, 2013
The new leader of SAF3 must face his personal issues in order to maintain his position in the organization. Meanwhile, the team intensifies their training schedule, focusing their energy on their respective weak points and helping one another overcoming their own fears.
10	"Second Chances"	Gary Capo	Tai Collins	January 18, 2014
Two members of the team experience first-hand the intransigent code of conduct by which SAF3 operates. Meanwhile, closure on a horrific experience that left him scarred for life brings Alfonso a new sense of purpose.
11	"Sacrifices"	Gary Capo	Paul Jackson	January 25, 2014
The SAF3 team are in a race against time to rescue refugees in a shipping container tossed overboard by human traffickers. The strong bond among the group is further strengthened beyond their work relationship by several acts of selflessness.
12	"Adrift"	Dave Keffer	Tai Collins	February 1, 2014
The SAF3 helicopter crashes, leaving three of the team seriously injured and adrift in the ocean. The rest of the team rallies to provide as much support as they can in the hopes of finding their friends alive.
13	"Barriers"	Eric Locko	Paul Jackson	February 15, 2014
Two of the SAF3 team become trapped in a collapsed bomb shelter whilst saving injured victims.
14	"Let It Burn"	Gary Capo	Paul Jackson	February 22, 2014
When the SAF3 team arrives at a dangerous chemical fire to find six firefighters trapped inside, they make the difficult decision to let it burn.
15	"Finding Home"	Gregory J. Bonann	Tai Collins	March 1, 2014
Eriksson goes to Cape Town to help Kacie find her father, and back at home the team gets a new helicopter.
16	"Father's Day"	Gregory J. Bonann	Tai Collins	March 8, 2014
One of the SAF3 team members is haunted by the memory of her father's death in a tragic fire.
17	"Who I Am"	Gregory J. Bonann	Hans Rodionoff	April 26, 2014
After the coast guard finds the wreckage of the SAF3 Helo, Texas, Graciela and Jared decide to return to the scene of their near fatal crash. Alfonso faces a life altering decision that could take him away from SAF3.
18	"Triumph Over Tragedy"	Gregory J. Bonann	Tai Collins	May 3, 2014
On the five-year anniversary of the catastrophic fire that formed SAF3, each member is forced to relieve the tragic event that changed their lives.
19	"Smoke Pipe"	Gary Capo	Hans Rodionoff	May 10, 2014
When a diver is trapped in an underwater intake pipe, members of SAF3 must risk their own lives to set him free.
20	"Independence Day"	Gary Capo	Hans Rodionoff	May 17, 2014
The Fourth of July is the busiest day of the year for the SAF3 team; their skills and courage are pushed to the limit when they respond to an offshore explosion.
