= She Spies =

- The main cast (left to right): Miller, Henstridge and Williams
- Created by: Vince Manze & Joe Livecchi and Steven Long Mitchell & Craig W Van Sickle
- Starring: Natasha Henstridge; Kristen Miller; Natashia Williams; Carlos Jacott; Jamie Iglehart; Cameron Daddo
- Theme music composer: Jerry Brunskill
- Composer: Jerry Brunskill
- Country of origin: United States
- Original language: English
- No. of seasons: 2
- No. of episodes: 40 (list of episodes)

Production
- Executive producers: Joe Livecchi; Vince Manze; Tony Blake; Gregory J. Bonann; Paul Jackson
- Producers: Dennis C. Duckwall; David Dwiggins
- Running time: 60 minutes
- Production companies: Reno and Osborn Productions (episodes 1–2); Tower 18 Productions (season 2); NBC Enterprises; MGM Television

Original release
- Network: NBC (syndicated)
- Release: July 20, 2002 – May 17, 2004

She Spies is an American action-adventure television show that ran from July 20, 2002, until May 17, 2004, in two seasons. The show was sold into syndication but the first four episodes premiered on NBC, whose syndication arm was one of the producers. Disappointing ratings during the show's second season led to its cancellation after season two ended. She Spies bore noticeable production and direction similarities with Charlie's Angels and V.I.P. (American TV series).

== Plot ==
Three female convicted felons who were incarcerated for electronic crimes ("DD"), confidence tricks ("Cassie") and battery ("Shane") are paroled from prison in exchange for work as secret operatives for the US government under 'ComCent', a branch of the ISD. In addition, they have to answer to a special agent in charge of the success of their operations and of making sure that the terms of their conditional release are consistently followed.

== Cast ==
- Natasha Henstridge as Cassandra "Cassie" Anne McBaine
- Kristen Miller as Deedra "D.D." Cummings
- Natashia Williams as Shane Phillips
- Carlos Jacott as Jack Wilde (season 1)
- Jamie Iglehart as Duncan Baleu (season 2)
- Cameron Daddo as Quentin Cross (season 2)

== Production ==
The show was created by a couple of NBC advertising executives, Vince Manze and Joe Livecchi, for MGM Television.

The show was produced by NBC Enterprises and MGM Worldwide Television Group, and during development was under the title of B.A.I.T.

The women used martial arts and hand-to-hand combat as fighting skills. No guns were used as weapons.

== Writing ==
"I was looking to do Lethal Weapon or Rush Hour with women." - Vince Manze

She Spies had very strong comedic and chick flick elements which in many instances proved even more relevant to the storytelling than the spy-related situations and gadgets themselves. The type of humor changed markedly from season one to season two, with the former containing much self-referential humor and breaking of the "fourth wall", while both these elements were removed in season two.

== Casting ==
Natasha Henstridge, who played Cassie, wasn't keen to sign up for the show as she was not interested in the same old "three spies" story, but the makers convinced her that the show would be planned as a spoof, have many comedy elements and no drama like Charlie's Angels.

== Release ==
NBC scheduled a showing of Species as a lead-in before the premiere.

From Saturday, 20 July 2002, at 10 p.m., and then for a total of four consecutive weeks, NBC broadcast She Spies. It did not air on NBC in the fall, but went into first-run syndication, on 30 September 2002, a partnership of NBC Enterprises and MGM Television.

== Reception ==
"following the departure of Pamela Anderson’s V.I.P., and this could certainly satiate the guys looking for sarcasm, short skirts and chicanery. Show attempts to be to Charlie's Angels what the Leslie Nielsen starrer Police Squad was to cop shows"

== Episodes ==
Season	Episodes	Originally released	
Season	Episodes	First released	Last released
1	20	July 20, 2002	May 10, 2003
2	20	September 20, 2003	May 15, 2004

== Home media ==
She Spies: The Complete First Season was released on March 14, 2006, by MGM Home Entertainment in a 4-DVD set.
