= Jocelyn Osorio =

Chilean actress and model

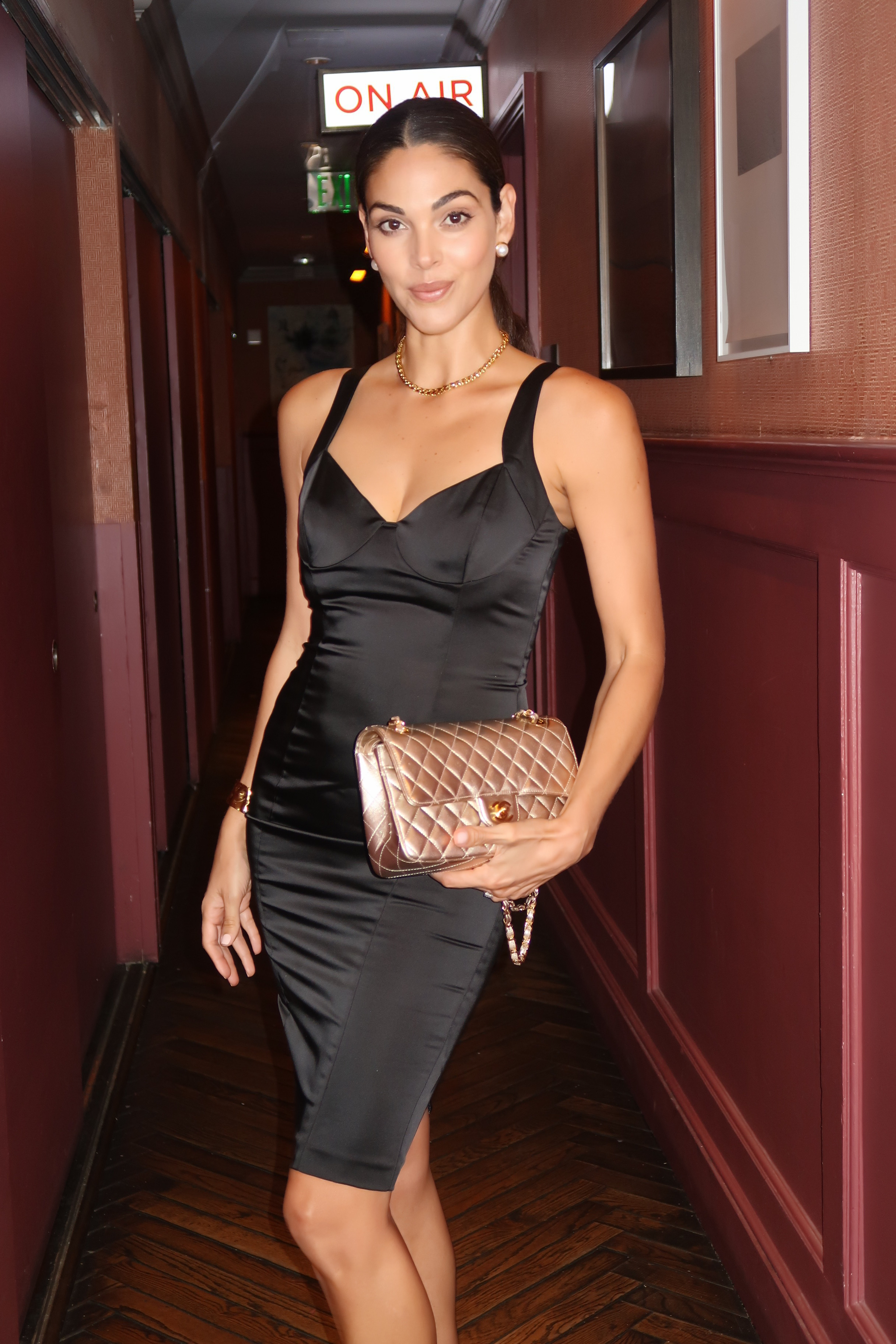
Image of Jocelyn Osorio

Jocelyn Osorio Alvarez is a Chilean actress and model.

== Life and career ==
She was born and raised in Iquique, Chile. After winning several local beauty competitions, she decided to move to the capital, Santiago, to pursue acting. In 2001 she was offered to participate in the Miss Chile pageant. She refused this offer in order to study drama in London at the Italia Conti Academy of Theatre Arts, where she later earned her BA in acting. After graduating she began touring around Europe performing classical and modern plays which then led to films and TV commercials. Since then she has appeared in many independent films and TV series in the United Kingdom. She has worked for brands such as Herbal Essence, J. C. Penney, Hyundai, Lulu Guinness, and Disaronno. She has also been the subject of a model test photo shoot with L.A. based photographer and graphic designer Lauren N. Dennis.

== Filmography ==
Television
Year	Title	Role	Notes
2007	StagKnight	Blossom	
2013	New Girl	Andrea	"Cooler" (season 2: episode 15)
2013	The Mentalist	Estella	"Days of Wine and Roses" (season 5: episode 11)
2013	How I Met Your Mother	Bellissima	"Romeward Bound" (season 8: episode 21)
2013–2014	SAF3	Graciela Vega	Series regular
