= Swimming at the 2004 Summer Olympics – Men's 4 × 100 metre medley relay =

Men's 4 × 100 metre medley relay at the Games of the XXVIII Olympiad
- Venue: Olympic Aquatic Centre
- Dates: August 20, 2004 (heats); August 21, 2004 (final)
- Competitors: 73 from 16 nations
- Winning time: 3:30.68 WR

Medalists
1st place, gold medalist(s)		Aaron Peirsol, Brendan Hansen, Ian Crocker, Jason Lezak, Lenny Krayzelburg*, Mark Gangloff*, Michael Phelps*, Neil Walker*	United States
2nd place, silver medalist(s)		Steffen Driesen, Jens Kruppa, Thomas Rupprath, Lars Conrad, Helge Meeuw*	Germany
3rd place, bronze medalist(s)		Tomomi Morita, Kosuke Kitajima, Takashi Yamamoto, Yoshihiro Okumura; *Indicates the swimmer only competed in the preliminary heats.	Japan

The men's 4 × 100 meter medley relay took place on 20–21 August at the Olympic Aquatic Centre of the Athens Olympic Sports Complex in Athens, Greece.

The U.S. team added two new world records to the books in the final men's event of the Olympic swimming program. Aaron Peirsol, Brendan Hansen, Ian Crocker, and Jason Lezak lowered their time set at the 2003 FINA World Championships in Barcelona, Spain, stopping the clock in 3:30.68. At the opening of the race, Peirsol led off a backstroke leg with a new world record of 53.45, beating a 0.15-second mark set by Lenny Krayzelburg (53.60) from the Pan Pacific Championships in 1999.

Meanwhile, the Germans earned a silver medal in a European record of 3:33.62, 11-hundredths of a second under the old Olympic record set by Team USA in 2000. Japan finished third in 3:35.22 to hold off the strong Russian team anchored by double Olympic champion Alexander Popov, who made up more than 1.5 seconds, but fell short of a medal in his last Olympic final.

== Records ==
Prior to this competition, the existing world and Olympic records were as follows.

World record	United States (USA); Aaron Peirsol (53.71); Brendan Hansen (59.61); Ian Crocker (50.39); Jason Lezak (47.83)	3:31.54	Barcelona, Spain	27 July 2003
Olympic record	United States; Lenny Krayzelburg (53.87); Ed Moses (59.84); Ian Crocker (52.10); Gary Hall Jr. (47.92)	3:33.73	Sydney, Australia	23 September 2000

The following new world and Olympic records were set during this competition.

Date	Event	Name	Nationality	Time	Record
August 21	Final	Aaron Peirsol (53.45); Brendan Hansen (59.37); Ian Crocker (50.28); Jason Lezak (47.58)	United States	3:30.68	WR

== Results ==
=== Heats ===
Rank	Heat	Lane	Nation	Swimmers	Time	Notes
1	2	4	United States	Lenny Krayzelburg (54.27); Mark Gangloff (1:00.27); Michael Phelps (52.43); Neil Walker (48.13)	3:35.10	Q
2	2	8	Germany	Steffen Driesen (54.75); Jens Kruppa (1:00.80); Helge Meeuw (52.73); Lars Conrad (48.37)	3:36.65	Q
3	2	2	Great Britain	Gregor Tait (55.36); James Gibson (1:00.30); James Hickman (52.23); Matthew Kidd (49.05)	3:36.94	Q
4	2	5	Japan	Tomomi Morita (54.63); Kosuke Kitajima (59.69); Takashi Yamamoto (52.66); Yoshihiro Okumura (50.06)	3:37.04	Q
5	2	6	Hungary	László Cseh (55.22); Richárd Bodor (1:00.31); Zsolt Gáspár (52.96); Attila Zubor (48.78)	3:37.27	Q
6	2	3	France	Simon Dufour (55.69); Hugues Duboscq (1:00.10); Franck Esposito (52.52); Frédérick Bousquet (49.29)	3:37.60	Q
7	1	4	Russia	Arkady Vyatchanin (55.47); Roman Sloudnov (1:01.22); Yevgeny Korotyshkin (52.35); Andrey Kapralov (49.03)	3:38.07	Q
8	1	3	Ukraine	Pavlo Illichov (56.40); Valeriy Dymo (1:01.23); Denys Sylantyev (52.41); Yuriy Yegoshin (48.81)	3:38.85	Q
9	1	5	Australia	Matt Welsh (55.36); Jim Piper (1:02.10); Adam Pine (53.02); Michael Klim (48.66)	3:39.14	
10	1	6	Canada	Riley Janes (56.17); Mike Brown (1:01.73); Mike Mintenko (52.48); Brent Hayden (48.98)	3:39.36	
11	1	2	Finland	Jani Sievinen (56.84); Jarno Pihlava (1:01.39); Jere Hård (53.19); Matti Rajakylä (50.22)	3:41.64	
12	2	1	New Zealand	Scott Talbot-Cameron (56.11); Ben Labowitch (1:03.88); Corney Swanepoel (52.41); Cameron Gibson (50.34)	3:42.74	
13	2	7	South Africa	Gerhard Zandberg (56.23); Terence Parkin (1:03.89); Eugene Botes (54.57); Karl Otto Thaning (49.25)	3:43.94	
14	1	7	Slovenia	Blaž Medvešek (56.47); Emil Tahirovič (1:02.52); Peter Mankoč (53.75); Jernej Godec (51.43)	3:44.17	
15	1	1	Brazil	Paulo Machado (57.33); Eduardo Fischer (1:02.58); Kaio de Almeida (53.52); Jader Souza (50.98)	3:44.41	
	1	8	Italy	Emanuele Merisi (56.55); Paolo Bossini; Mattia Nalesso; Giacomo Vassanelli	DSQ	

=== Final ===
Rank	Lane	Nation	Swimmers	Time	Time behind	Notes
1st place, gold medalist(s)	4	United States	Aaron Peirsol (53.45) WR; Brendan Hansen (59.37); Ian Crocker (50.28); Jason Lezak (47.58)	3:30.68		WR
2nd place, silver medalist(s)	5	Germany	Steffen Driesen (54.26); Jens Kruppa (1:00.50); Thomas Rupprath (51.40); Lars Conrad (47.46)	3:33.62	2.94	EU
3rd place, bronze medalist(s)	6	Japan	Tomomi Morita (54.25) AS; Kosuke Kitajima (59.35); Takashi Yamamoto (51.87); Yoshihiro Okumura (49.75)	3:35.22	4.54	AS
4	1	Russia	Arkady Vyatchanin (55.15); Roman Sloudnov (1:01.00); Igor Marchenko (51.74); Alexander Popov (48.02)	3:35.91	5.23	
5	7	France	Simon Dufour (55.74); Hugues Duboscq (1:00.07); Franck Esposito (52.22); Frédérick Bousquet (48.54)	3:36.57	5.89	
6	8	Ukraine	Pavlo Illichov (56.19); Oleg Lisogor (1:00.99); Andriy Serdinov (50.80); Yuriy Yegoshin (48.89)	3:36.87	6.19	
7	2	Hungary	László Cseh (54.89); Richárd Bodor (1:00.25); Zsolt Gáspár (53.32); Attila Zubor (49.00)	3:37.46	6.78	
8	3	Great Britain	Gregor Tait (55.69); James Gibson (1:00.30); James Hickman (52.64); Matthew Kidd (49.14)	3:37.77	7.09	
