= Eugene Botes =

South African swimmer (born 1980)

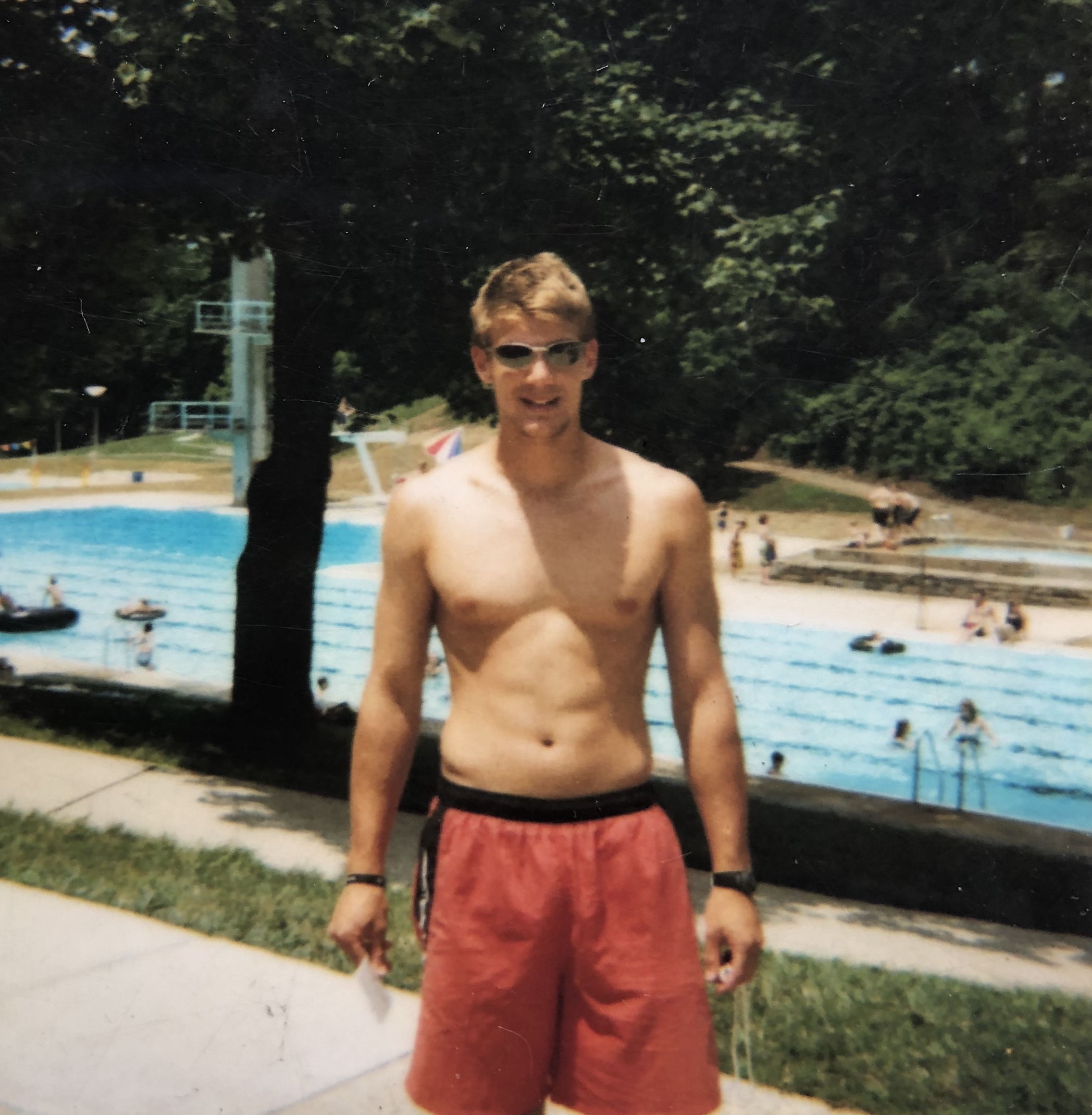
- Botes at Hidden Hollow Swim Club

Personal information
- Full name: Eugene Botes
- National team: South Africa
- Born: 9 June 1980 (age 46) Vanderbijlpark, South Africa
- Height: 1.93 m (6 ft 4 in)
- Weight: 101 kg (223 lb)

Sport
- Sport: Swimming
- Strokes: Butterfly
- Club: Suburban Swim Club (U.S.)
- College team: Pennsylvania State University (U.S.)
- Coach: Charlie Kennedy (U.S.)

Eugene Botes (born 9 June 1980) is a South African former swimmer, who specialized in butterfly events. He became the first swimmer to represent his country South Africa in international tournaments, while playing for the Penn State Nittany Lions in his senior season. He also holds a dual citizenship between South Africa and the United States.

Botes qualified for two swimming events at the 2004 Summer Olympics in Athens. He established a South African record and a FINA A-standard entry time of 53.20 (100 m butterfly) from the USA National Championships in College Park, Maryland. In the 100 m butterfly, Botes challenged seven other swimmers on the sixth heat, including top medal favorites Andriy Serdinov and Denys Sylantyev of Ukraine. He edged out Mexico's Joshua Ilika Brenner to notch a seventh spot and thirtieth overall by 0.15 of a second in 54.15.

Botes also teamed up with Gerhard Zandberg, Terence Parkin, and Karl Otto Thaning in the 4×100 m medley relay. Swimming the butterfly leg in heat two, Botes recorded a time of 54.57, but the South Africans rounded out the field to last place and thirteenth overall with a final time of 3:43.94.

Botes is also a graduate of computer science at the Pennsylvania State University in University Park, Pennsylvania. He previously trained for the Suburban Swim Club under his long-time coach and mentor Charlie Kennedy. Botes trained at Media, Pennsylvania's Hidden Hollow Swim Club where he also served as head lifeguard.

== See also ==
- List of Pennsylvania State University Olympians
