= Martin Bayfield =

English rugby union footballer and broadcaster (born 1966)

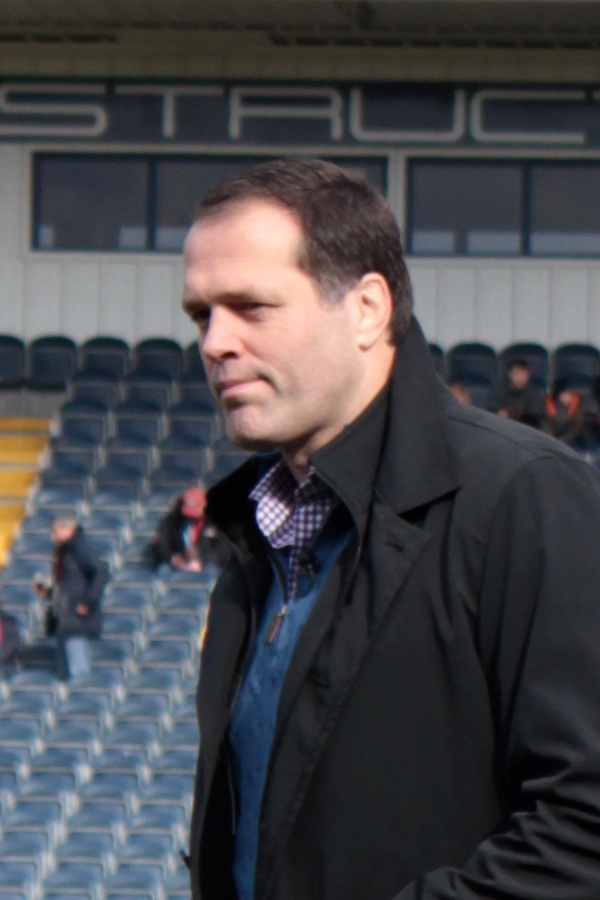
- Bayfield at Sixways Stadium, Worcester
- Born: Martin Christopher Bayfield; 21 December 1966 (age 59) Bedford, Bedfordshire, England
- Height: 2.09 m (6 ft 10 in)
- Weight: 115 kg (254 lb – 18 st 2 lb)

Rugby union career
- Position: Lock
Senior career
Years	Team	Apps	(Points)
- Northampton
–	Bedford Blues		
International career
Years	Team	Apps	(Points)
1991–1996	England	34	(0)
1993	British & Irish Lions	3	(0)

Martin Christopher Bayfield (born 21 December 1966) is an English broadcaster, actor, stuntman and former rugby union player who played lock forward for Northampton Saints, Bedford Blues and England, gaining 31 England and 3 Lions caps.

== Early life and career ==
Bayfield was born in Bedford and was educated at Bedford School. He served with the Metropolitan Police from 1985 to 1989, before transferring to Bedfordshire Police. The 208 cm (6 ft 10in) tall Bayfield made his England debut in 1991, and although he was omitted from the 1991 World Cup squad, he was a part of the 1992 Five Nations Grand Slam winning side. He went on the 1993 British Lions tour to New Zealand, and was part of the 1995 World Cup squad. He would play 18 times partnering Martin Johnson. His final appearance for England came in the 1996 Five Nations match against Wales.

His last game was against Gloucester in February 1998; a neck injury sustained in training a few days later forced him to retire.

== Film and television career ==
Since retirement, Bayfield has worked as a journalist, an after-dinner speaker, and has appeared in all of the Harry Potter films playing the half-giant Hagrid, as Robbie Coltrane's body and stunt double (he also appeared in Harry Potter and the Chamber of Secrets as a young Rubeus Hagrid). Continuing the acting theme, he also played a cyclops in Jonathan Liebesman's Wrath of the Titans, the sequel to the 2010 movie Clash of the Titans. Bayfield also played "Rugby Player 1" in an episode of the BBC One series New Tricks (first shown on 1 September 2008).

In his broadcasting career, Bayfield has presented the NFL and World's Strongest Man coverage on UK Channel Five and worked as a rugby correspondent on BBC Radio 5 Live. He also served as a presenter for ITV's coverage of the 2007 and 2011 Rugby World Cups, as well as presenting ITV's Guinness Premiership highlights. From 2012 to 2016, he co-presented BBC's Crimewatch with Kirsty Young. From 23 August 2018 Martin took part in Celebrity Masterchef of which he reached the final three shown on BBC one on 28 September 2018.

In 2013, BT Sport acquired the exclusive rights to the Aviva Premiership. Bayfield (along with his ITV co-presenter Craig Doyle) moved to the new channel and he now works as a presenter, pundit and pitchside reporter.

== Personal life ==
Bayfield is married to his second wife Jane Goodman, and has three daughters with his first wife, Helena.One of his daughters, Polly, is a journalist who worked for BBC Radio 1's Newsbeat programme.

Bayfield is an Honorary President of the Wooden Spoon Society, the rugby charity that supports disadvantaged children and young people.

Bayfield released A Very Tall Story, a memoir of his rugby days, on 15 Sept. 2022.

== Filmography ==
=== Film ===
Year	Title	Role	Notes
2001	Harry Potter and the Philosopher's Stone	Rubeus Hagrid	Also stunts and body double for Robbie Coltrane
2002	Harry Potter and the Chamber of Secrets	Young Rubeus Hagrid	Also body double for Robbie Coltrane
2004	Harry Potter and the Prisoner of Azkaban	Rubeus Hagrid	Also stunts and body double for Robbie Coltrane
2005	Harry Potter and the Goblet of Fire	Rubeus Hagrid	Also stunts and body double for Robbie Coltrane
2007	Harry Potter and the Order of the Phoenix	Rubeus Hagrid	Also stunts and body double for Robbie Coltrane
2009	Harry Potter and the Half-Blood Prince	Rubeus Hagrid	Also stunts and body double for Robbie Coltrane
2010	Harry Potter and the Deathly Hallows – Part 1	Rubeus Hagrid	Also stunts and body double for Robbie Coltrane
2011	Harry Potter and the Deathly Hallows – Part 2	Rubeus Hagrid	Also stunts and body double for Robbie Coltrane
2007	StagKnight	Knight / William	
2012	Wrath of the Titans	Cyclops	

=== Television ===
Year	Title	Role	Notes
2002	Time Gentlemen Please	Francis	Episode: "Landlord of the Giants"
2006	New Tricks	Rugby Player 1	Episode: "Lady's Pleasure"
2018	Celebrity Masterchef	Finalist	
