= StagKnight =

- Directed by: Simon Cathcart
- Written by: Simon Cathcart; Rob Mercer
- Produced by: Paul Coskun; Rob Mercer
- Starring: Jocelyn Osorio; Sandra Dickinson; Simeon Willis; Martin Bayfield
- Cinematography: Robert Shacklady
- Edited by: Lalit Goyal
- Music by: Jimi Tenor; Paul Weir
- Production company: Stag Knight Ltd.
- Release date: 2007
- Running time: 90 minutes
- Country: United Kingdom
- Language: English
- Budget: £1,500,000 (estimated)

StagKnight is a 2007 English black comedy-horror film directed by Simon Cathcart and written by Cathcart and Rob Mercer. It stars Martin Bayfield as a murderous knight who hunts down a paintball team during a weekend party. The title is a reference to a stag night, the party featured in the film.

Two tie-in Flash games were created to promote the film, the second of which was played over a million times on Newgrounds.com prior to its deletion.

== Plot ==
A paintballing team known as the "Weekend Warriors" heads to a woodland retreat just outside London to celebrate the marital engagement of one of their members. However, deep within the forest, an ancient warrior preserved from the time of King Arthur has awoken and begins to hunt them down one by one.

== Cast ==
- Martin Bayfield as Knight and William
- Jocelyn Osorio as Blossom and the young explorer
- Sandra Dickinson as Fay
- Simeon Willis as Brian
- Simon Cathcart as Sean
- James Hillier as Charles
- Barry McNeill as Steve the Queen
- Joe Montana as Roger
- John Campbell-Mac as Wolf
- Tony Tang as Makoto
- Santos Regules as Santos
- Jason Lee Hyde as David
- Paul Coskun as Mike / Brenda
- Danielle Mason as Ginger
- Harry Athwal as the driver
- Stephen Wisdom as the lead explorer
