= Gregory J. Bonann =

American television director, television producer and screenwriter

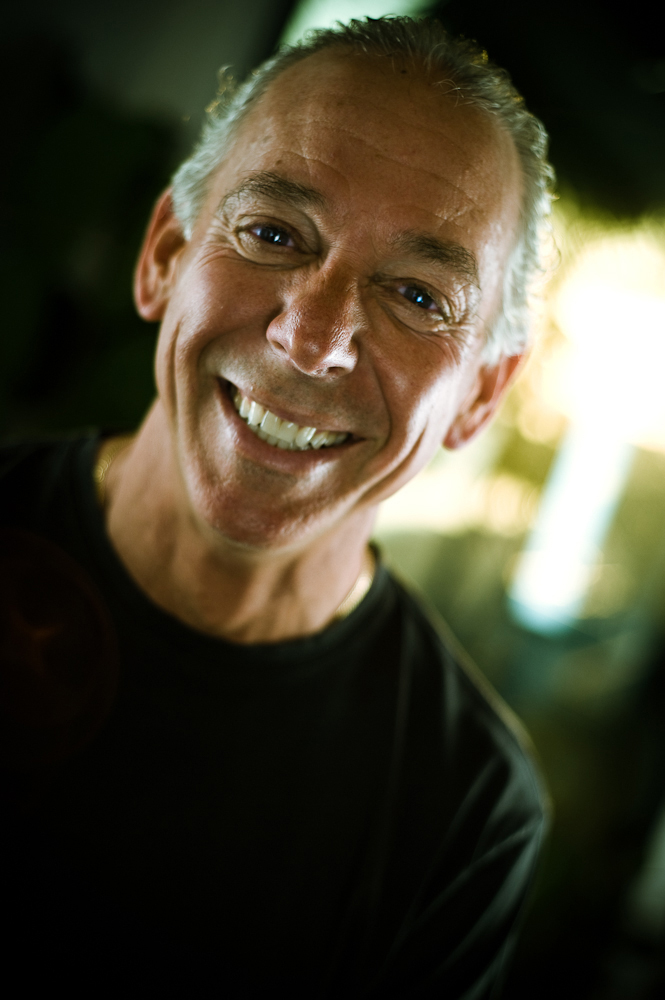
- Bonann in 2009
- Born: June 28, 1952 (age 74); Santa Monica, California, U.S.
- Occupations: Lifeguard, television producer, director, writer, Showrunner
- Known for: Baywatch, She Spies, SAF3

Gregory J. Bonann (born June 28, 1952) is an American lifeguard, television producer, director, writer, and showrunner. He is best known for co-creating the internationally syndicated television series, Baywatch, which ran for eleven seasons (242 episodes), and was listed in the 2001 Guinness Book of World Records as the most widely viewed TV series in the world. He has remained actively involved with the Baywatch franchise for nearly four decades. Bonann is also one of the longest-serving active Los Angeles County Ocean Lifeguards at 57 years and counting. Together with his wife, writer and producer Tai Collins, he co-founded A Chance for Children Foundation, a nonprofit organization dedicated to youth development, ocean safety, and educational opportunities.

== Early life ==
Bonann was born in Santa Monica, California, to Catholic parents Regina (née Caput), a bank teller, and Louis John Bonann, a physician and veteran of World War II. He was raised in West Los Angeles with two sisters, Kathleen and Deborah.

As a child, Bonann suffered from severe asthma and allergies. He was born with club feet and severe visual impairment, and was close to death twice before the age of two.

Bonann attended Palisades High School from 1967 through 1970, and since his allergies ruled out any outdoor sports, he joined the swim team. Contact lenses corrected his vision, but swimming with them proved difficult, so Bonann needed special visual aids to see the walls of the pool. He ultimately specialized in the backstroke so that he could use the overhead flags to better gauge his turns. He was voted most-improved swimmer in his second year, but he didn't win a competitive race until two years later. In his senior year, Bonann was voted most-valuable.

In the fall of 1970, Bonann attended Washington State University as a freshman on a partial athletic scholarship. He was recruited by the U.S. Olympic Committee and trained to compete in the modern pentathlon. Although he didn't qualify for the event, Bonann travelled to Munich for the 1972 Summer Olympics as a non-competitor.

When WSU dropped the men's swimming program, Bonann transferred to California State University in Long Beach, California. He continued to swim with the CSULB team, alongside Olympic athletes Gunnar Larsson, Klaus Barth, and Hans Fassnacht, until 1974 when he graduated with a BA degree in journalism.

== Lifeguarding ==
In 1970, Bonann began his lifeguard career as an LA City Ocean Lifeguard. After the completion of rookie academy, he was given his choice of post and served in lifeguard tower #18 on Will Rogers State Beach, a short distance from his family home in West Los Angeles.

Bonann became a Los Angeles County Lifeguard in 1975, when the city and county services merged. He served on the beaches of the Central Section, including Topanga, Will Rogers, Santa Monica, Venice, and Del Rey.

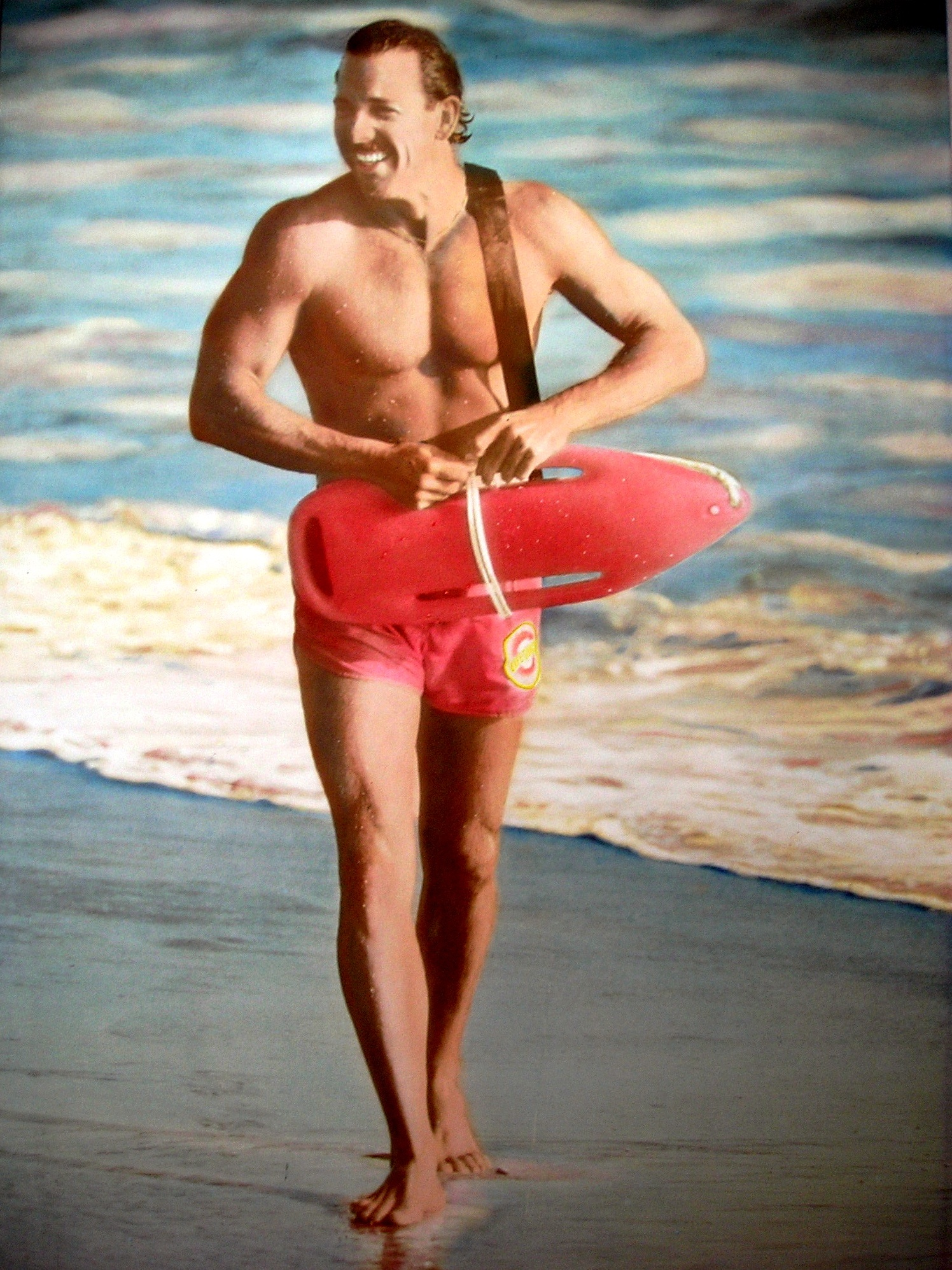
Lifeguard Gregory J. Bonann working on Will Rogers State Beach in 1989. Photo by Kim Carlsberg.

In the summer of 1977, while working Will Rogers State Beach, Bonann performed a routine rescue of some children who were caught in a riptide. The children's father was Stu Erwin, Jr., who worked for MTM Enterprises, a television production company run by Grant Tinker, the future chairman and CEO of NBC. Bonann would go on to pitch his idea for a television show about lifeguards to Erwin and Tinker, who eventually helped him sell the show to NBC.

In 1989, while scouting locations in Venice Beach, California with the Baywatch producers and writing staff, Bonann was approached by a teenager who had lost his friend in the water. Bonann swam out and made three surface dives before finding the boy, who had been submerged for several minutes, and revived him using mouth-to-mouth resuscitation while treading water. The boy was taken to UCLA Medical Center where he recovered. Bonann received the Medal of Valor from Los Angeles County for performing that rescue.

In 1994 the L.A. County Lifeguard services merged into the Los Angeles County Fire Department, making Bonann an L.A. County Firefighter within its Lifeguard Division.

In 2001, Bonann became an Ocean Lifeguard for Honolulu City and County, Oahu, Hawaii.

Bonann transferred to the Northern Section of Los Angeles County in 2013, including Malibu and Zuma beaches,. He has been a Junior Lifeguard Instructor at Zuma Beach since 2014 and for more than five decades has remained an active duty Los Angeles County Lifeguard.

Bonann has been recognized by both the Belgian Life Saving Federation, and the International Life Saving Federation for his dedication to the field, and in 2000 he was awarded the Gold Medallion from the International Swimming Hall of Fame for his achievements and contributions.

In 2021 the Professional Lifeguard Foundation honored Bonann with a Lifetime Achievement Award for his decades of service and dedication in fostering the professional and personal growth of the Los Angeles County Lifeguards through teaching and mentoring relationships.

== Early film career ==
Bonann began his career in film and television in 1978 when he was hired by John J. (Jack) Hennessy, of JJH Productions. Hennessy had been producing films for the U.S. Olympic Committee, and Bonann had connections to that world.

Hennessy took Bonann under his wing, teaching him to produce and direct documentary films. His first major project was a film called Fire and Ice, the USOC's official film for the 1980 Winter Games in Lake Placid, New York, which told the story of the U.S. Men's National Ice Hockey Team victory over the U.S.S.R. and Eric Heiden's historic five gold medals in speed skating. The documentary won several awards, including the CINE Golden Eagle and the 37th International Di Cinema Citta Di Torino for best sports film of the year.

When Hennessy died in 1983, Bonann continued to run JJH Productions, producing over twenty films, including two more official films for the USOC. Frozen in Time featured the 1984 Winter Games in Sarajevo, Yugoslavia, and Elements of Gold highlighted the 1984 Summer Games in Los Angeles. Both films were recognized with numerous awards including the CINE Golden Eagle.

In 1987, Bonann formed his own production company called Tower 18 Productions, named for his original lifeguard tower on Will Rogers State Beach. The first project under his new banner was another documentary for the USOC called City of Gold about the 1988 Winter Olympics in Calgary, Alberta, Canada.

All of Bonann's Olympic films used slow motion photography and music to accentuate the athlete's performances. This would become his signature style. In fact, many of the camera operators, production crew, and the editor that Bonann worked with for these early productions would form the core of the Baywatch production company.

== Baywatch ==
"My success was less about being a great filmmaker, and more about being a good businessman, surrounding myself with people who were talented in a variety of different areas."

— Gregory J. Bonann, Malibu Times Magazine (Jul/Aug 2012)

During the mid 1970s, Bonann imagined a television series that featured the heroic stories of his lifeguard friends. After meeting Stu Erwin Jr. of Grant Tinker's MTM Enterprises in 1977, he pitched the idea, which at that time was called A.C.E.S., for Aquatic Corps for Emergency Service. Erwin declined, but he encouraged Bonann to continue to develop the concept.

In 1981, while working at JJH Productions, Bonann began pitching the idea again. At his mother's suggestion, he renamed the show Baywatch, but he continued his attempts to sell the series with no success for the next six years.

Bonann met the writing team of Douglas Schwartz and Michael Berk through his sister, Deborah, who was engaged to Schwartz. They agreed to help Bonann develop the project. The three of them took Baywatch back to Stu Erwin, Jr., who was still working for Grant Tinker at his new production company, GTG Entertainment. In 1988, Tinker and Erwin added Baywatch to their projects in development.

Due to the 1988 Writers Guild of America strike, GTG was unable to use a written script to pitch the show, so Tinker asked Bonann to produce a video sales presentation. Bonann used his documentary crew to shoot and edit footage of the March 1988 lifeguard tryouts, along with slow motion action shots of several of his lifeguard friends. On the strength of that presentation, Brandon Tartikoff purchased a two-hour movie pilot for NBC, after which Baywatch was picked up for series.

After one season on NBC, Baywatch was canceled. Tinker sold the rights to the program back to Bonann for ten dollars, and along with Schwartz, Berk, and the show's lead actor, David Hasselhoff, Bonann launched the series in first-run syndication, resulting in ten more seasons, including two in Hawaii, and even a short-lived spinoff series called Baywatch Nights.

Bonann's relationship with the L.A. County Lifeguards allowed him to build a functioning interior and exterior set above the actual lifeguard headquarters on Will Rogers State Beach, where Bonann began his lifeguard career nearly twenty years earlier.

Baywatch was seen in 145 countries and was translated into over 42 languages. It was listed in the 2001 Guinness Book of World Records as the most widely viewed TV series in the world with a weekly audience of over 1.1 billion.

By its end, Bonann had executive produced 289 episodes of Baywatch, Baywatch Nights, and Baywatch Hawaii. He directed a total of 75 episodes and 400 of his signature music montages. From the beginning of the pilot movie in 1988 to the wrap of the final episode in 2001, Baywatch had dominated 14 years of Bonann's life.

== Career progression ==
In addition to his work on Baywatch, Bonann produced several TV pilots, series and TV movies, including Steel Chariots for Fox, Thunder in Paradise starring Hulk Hogan, and a pilot movie for UPN called Avalon: Beyond the Abyss.

In 2002, NBC and MGM Television launched a new series called She Spies starring Natasha Henstridge. After four episodes, the production shut down due to budget overages and creative discord. The network and studio turned to Bonann to solve the problems, and production resumed. The series went on to complete two seasons and forty episodes.

In 2008, Bonann and wife Tai Collins, a writer on Baywatch, began developing an action-drama series called Rescue 3. After partnering with Emmet-Furla Films, financing was raised. The series was renamed SAF3 standing for Sea Air Fire Rescue, and Dolph Lundgren and J.R. Martinez were cast as leads.

Bonann began filming SAF3 in Cape Town, South Africa in 2013, and twenty episodes were produced independently for first-run syndication. It became the first independently financed one-hour drama to air in the United States on prime-time. To date the series has been sold in sixty-six countries airing on a multitude of networks worldwide as well as various streaming platforms.

== Baywatch Revival (2025–Present) ==
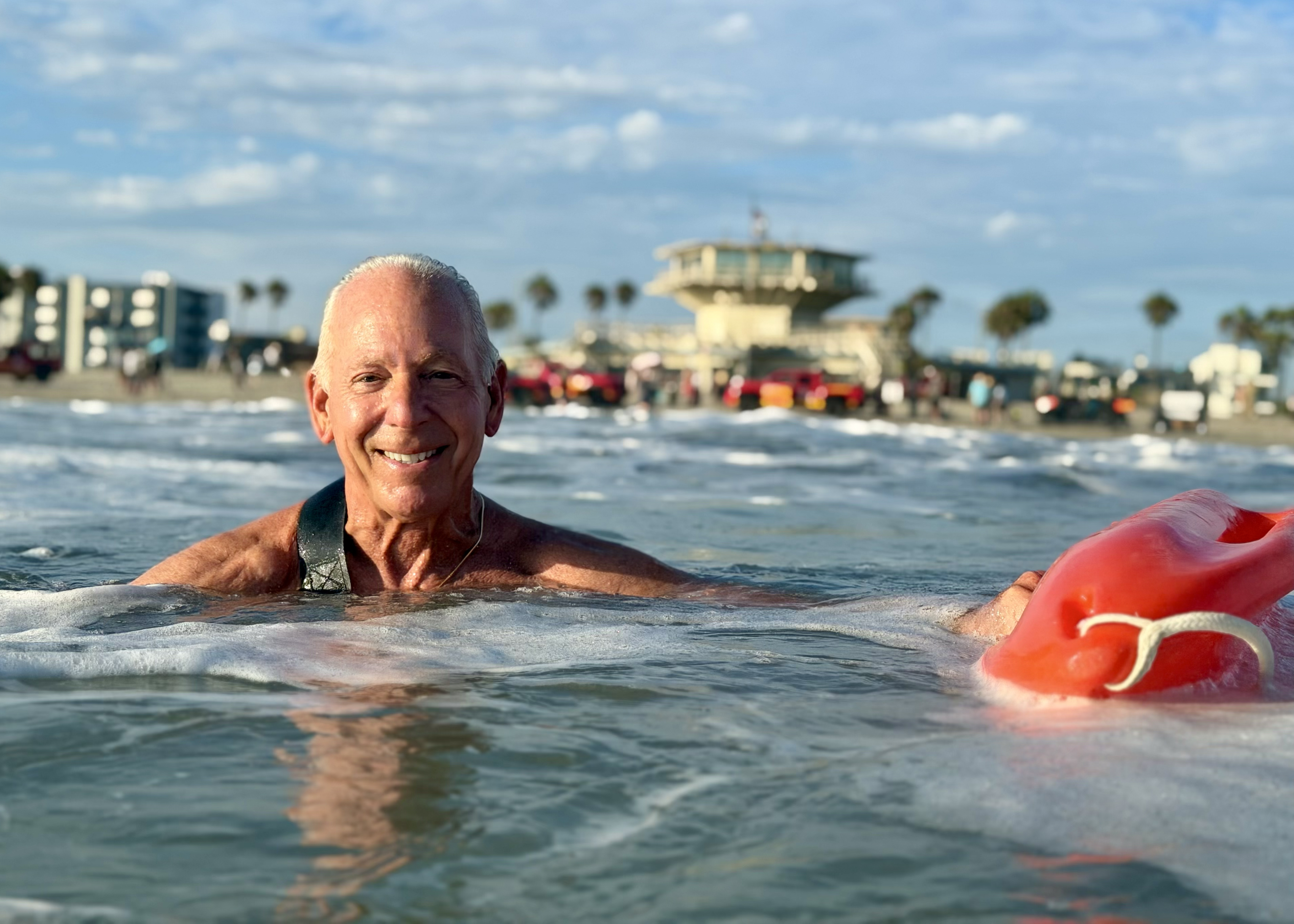
Gregory J Bonann’s two worlds collide. In the ocean at Venice Beach while they are filming the new Baywatch series in the background.

In September 2025, Fox Entertainment and Fremantle announced the reboot of Baywatch, the legendary lifeguard series, to air during the 2026-2027 broadcast season. The new series began filming in Venice Beach in March 2026 and will begin airing in January 2027.

Bonann again serves as Executive Producer for the revival of Baywatch. He was instrumental in the decision to produce the series in Los Angeles and once again decided to use a real functioning lifeguard headquarters as the principal set. This time, using the iconic Venice Lifeguard Tower as the Baywatch television series headquarters. He continues his role in preserving the authenticity of the franchise.

== Career Legacy ==
Bonann has left a lasting influence on television through the worldwide cultural impact of Baywatch, authentic ocean-rescue storytelling, action cinematography, and his continuing influence on the franchise and lifeguard community.

=== Cultural Impact of Baywatch ===
- Reached over one billion weekly viewers worldwide at its peak (pre-internet and pre-social media).
- Broadcast in 144 countries and translated into 46 languages.
- Defined 1990s pop culture with its iconic red swimsuits and slow-motion running sequences.

=== Storytelling and Cinematography ===
- Baywatch is based on Bonann’s real-life experience as a Los Angeles County lifeguard.
- Pioneered fast-paced water and aerial rescue action sequences.
- Was the first to use a cinematic controlled underwater environment tank (CUE) to shoot a weekly television series.
- Pioneered the use of musical montages to advance story and character development.

=== Legacy and Lifeguard Community ===
- Inspired generations of youth to pursue professional ocean lifeguarding.
- Brought global respect and awareness to the skills needed for ocean rescue.
- Maintained ongoing ties to beach safety education and the lifeguard culture.

== Philanthropy ==
In 1992, Bonann and his wife, Collins, launched a non-profit organization called The Camp Baywatch Foundation to benefit homeless and at-risk youth.

The foundation began by teaching inner city children about water safety through a week-long summer camp at Pepperdine University in Malibu, California. Bonann called in favors from Baywatch cast members, Olympic athletes, and other celebrities who volunteered at the camp. The children were not only taught to swim in both a pool and the ocean, but each received individual instruction in water safety from LA County Lifeguard, U.S. Coast Guard, and L.A. County Fire personnel. Since then, the charity has grown into a year-round program, partnering with Los Angeles Unified School District, Los Angeles Department of Recreation and Parks, the Housing Authority of the City of Los Angeles, and the Los Angeles Police Department. In addition to the Summer Camp the foundation offers a variety of after-school, summer, and sports programs, as well as educational trips, and college scholarships.

When the Baywatch television series ended in 2001, the foundation name was changed to "A Chance For Children Foundation".

NBC's The Today Show honored Bonann in 2009 by choosing A Chance For Children as one of their charities of the year.

In 2013, while working on SAF3, Bonann and Collins established a new branch of A Chance for Children in Cape Town, South Africa. This international extension of the foundation focuses on the education of the children of the townships of Langa, Gugulethu, and Khayelitsha. In 2020, they expanded their reach to Eastern Cape partnering with Youth Potential South Africa serving children in rural communities.

For over three decades, A Chance for Children has served youth offering year-round programs focusing on youth leadership programs, scholarships, and ocean safety education.

== Awards and recognition ==
- Medal of Valor (1989) Los Angeles County
- Knight in the Order of Lifesaving (1996) International Life Saving Federation
- Commander in the Order of Lifesaving (1997) The Belgian Life Saving Federation.
- Gold Medallion (2000) International Swimming Hall of Fame
- Lifetime Achievement Award (2021) Professional Lifeguard Foundation
