= Shoes That Fit =

American nonprofit organization

Shoes That Fit is a 501(c)(3) non-profit organization based in Claremont, California, that provides new shoes to low-income children. The mission of Shoes That Fit is to tackle one of the most visible signs of poverty in America by giving children in need new athletic shoes.

== History ==
Shoes That Fit began in 1992 helping children at one elementary school in Pomona, California. Today, Shoes That Fit helps children in all 50 U.S. states and the District of Columbia. Since its founding, Shoes That Fit has provided over 3 million new pairs of shoes and other necessities.

In 2022-23, Shoes That Fit provided new shoes to over 180,000 children across the U.S. 91% of participating schools report an increase in self-esteem after children receive new shoes.
