= Los Angeles County Lifeguards =

Division of the Los Angeles County Fire Department

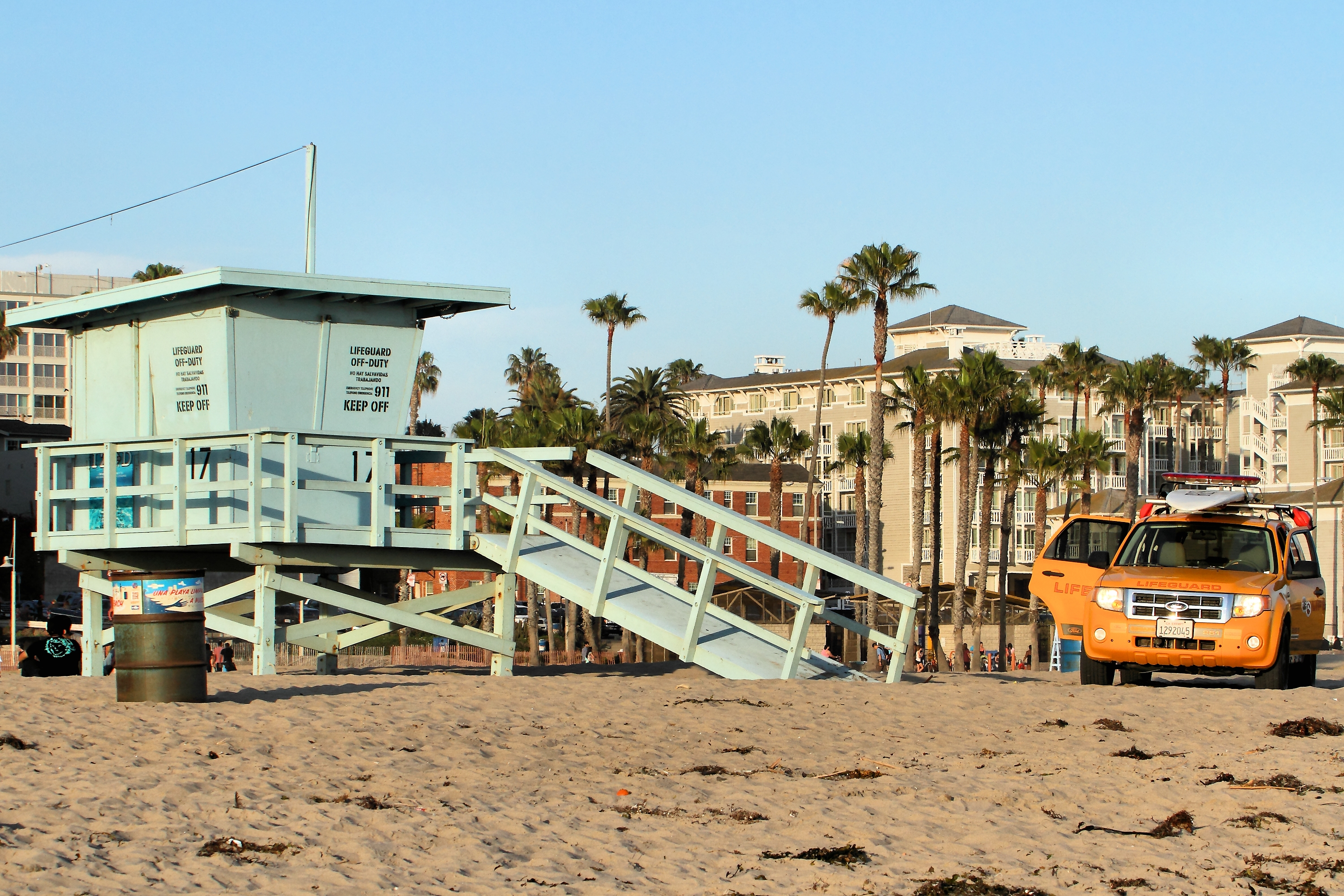

Operational area
- Country: United States
- State: California
- County: Los Angeles

Agency overview
- Established: 1914
- Employees: 788 lifeguards (2021)
- Staffing: Combination (Recurrent & Career)
- EMS level: Basic Life Support (BLS) & Advanced Life Support (ALS)

Facilities and equipment
- Stations: 24 lifeguard stations, 159 lifeguard towers (2021)
- Fireboats: 8 (2021)

Website
- fire.lacounty.gov

Los Angeles County Lifeguards is a division of the Los Angeles County Fire Department. The lifeguard operations safeguard 31 miles (50 km) of beach and 72 miles (116 km) of coastline, from San Pedro in the south, to Malibu in the north. The Los Angeles County Lifeguards are the largest professional lifeguard service in the world, and as of 2021, employs 174 full-time lifeguards and 614 recurrent lifeguards.

The Los Angeles County Lifeguards served as the model for the hit television series Baywatch which was created by recurrent lifeguard Gregory J. Bonann.

Los Angeles County Lifeguards also provide marine firefighting, paramedic, and fire boat services to Catalina Island, with operations out of Avalon and the Isthmus. Other daily fire boat services operate out of Los Angeles Harbor (Baywatch Cabrillo), King Harbor (Baywatch Redondo), Marina Del Rey (Baywatch Del Rey and Baywatch Santa Monica) and Malibu Pier (Baywatch Malibu). In addition to providing marine firefighting, LA County Lifeguards have specialized training for fire boat operations

Prior to July 1, 1994, Los Angeles County Lifeguards were part of the Department of Beaches and Harbors.

== Ranks ==
LA County Fire Department Lifeguard Division Lifeguard Series Personnel Ranks
Rank	Description
Chief, Lifeguard Services	Directs the Lifeguard Division of the Fire Department.
Assistant Chief, Lifeguard Services	Assists in the management of the Lifeguard Division of the Fire Department.
Section Chief, Lifeguard Services	Manages and supervises all rescue and lifesaving operations for a section of ocean shoreline.
Ocean Lifeguard Captain/Rescue Boat Captain	Supervises all ocean lifeguard personnel assigned to one area of a beach or to a section's headquarters on a day and/or night shift. Commands and operates a rescue boat engaged in rescue operations in the coastal waters of Los Angeles County.
Ocean Lifeguard Specialist	Performs specialized ocean lifeguard and rescue duties.
Ocean Lifeguard	Performs lifeguard and ocean rescue duties on an assigned section of ocean beach.
Ocean Lifeguard Candidate	Participates in an intensive training program in advanced ocean lifeguarding and emergency medical treatment.

== Organization ==
The Los Angeles County Lifeguards's beach operations are structured across two operational battalions:

- Marine Battalion 100, covering the beaches of Cabrillo, Torrance, Redondo, Hermosa, Manhattan, Dockweiler, and Catalina Island.
- Marine Battalion 300, covering beaches including Venice, Santa Monica, Topanga, Malibu and Zuma.

Each Marine Battalion is overseen by a section chief. Each beach within a Battalion's responsibility is overseen by an ocean lifeguard captain. Each beach is split into sections, managed by ocean lifeguard specialists.

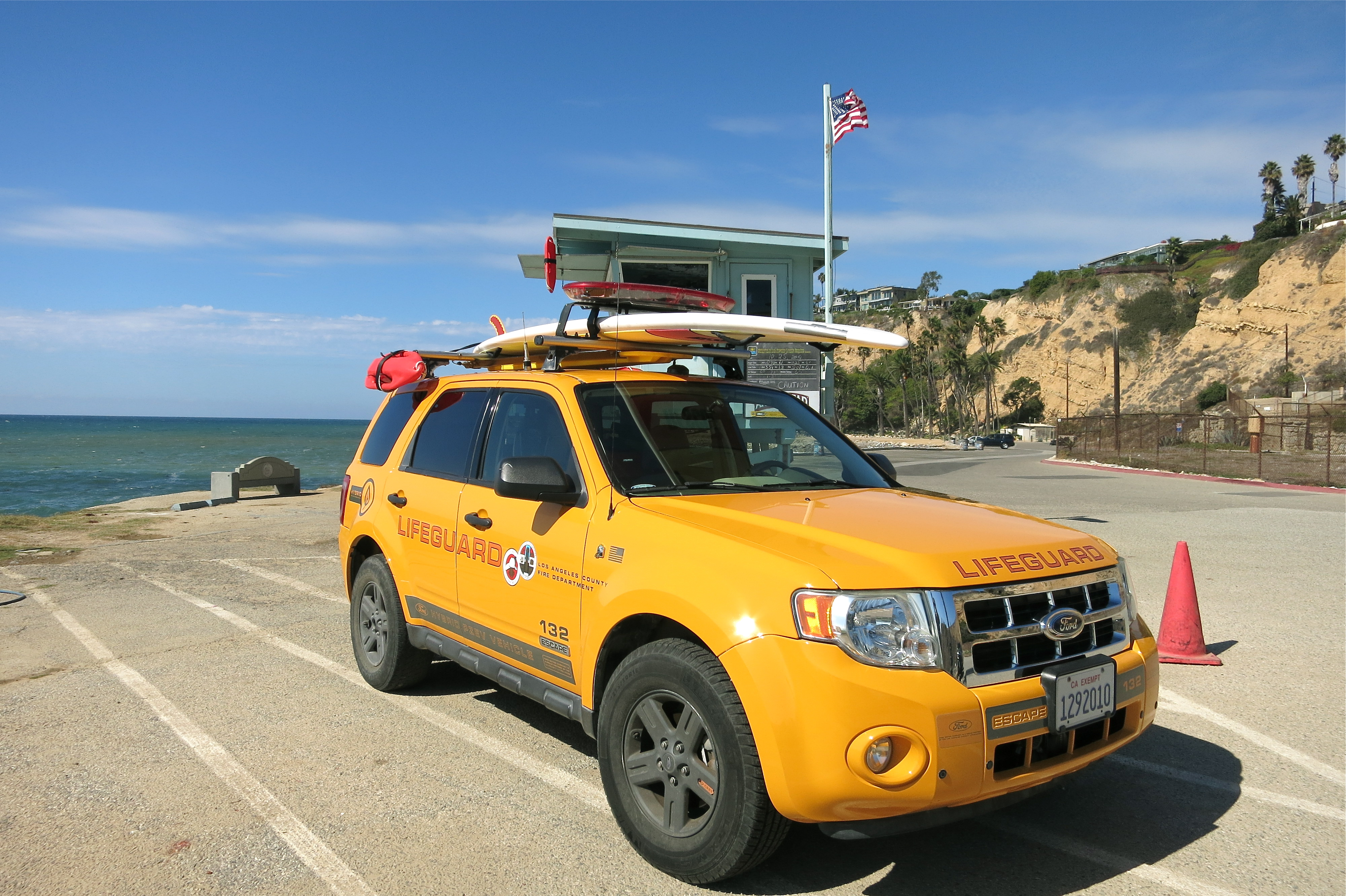
LACoFD Lifeguard Rescue Vehicle Royal Palms State Beach, San Pedro, California, 2014

The Los Angeles County Lifeguards are supported by specialist teams including:

- Rescue Boat Section, operating the Division's fleet of Baywatch Rescue Boats
- Swiftwater Rescue Teams, responsible for performing rescues in natural and man-made waterways across Los Angeles County
- Underwater Rescue & Recovery Unit (URRU)
- Catalina Paramedic Operations, responsible for providing emergency medical services, marine fire-fighting, cliff rescue and high-angle rescue to the residents of Catalina Island

== Equipment ==
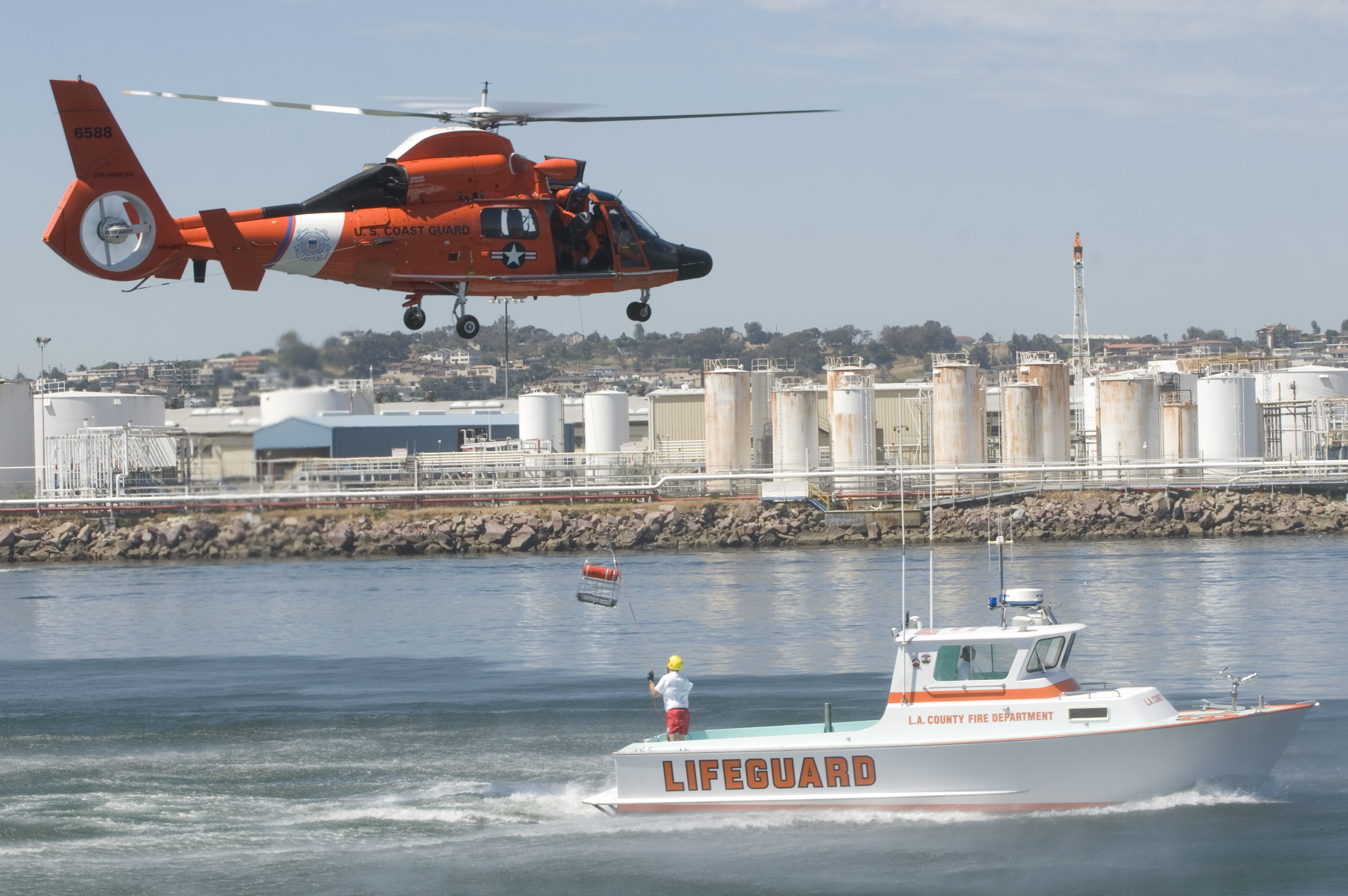
LA County Lifeguards Baywatch Rescue Boat

=== Watercraft ===
- Rescue Watercraft, used to perform ocean rescues, assist swift-water incidents, transport dive team members, and provide water safety for events.
- 32-34 ft Baywatch Rescue Boat, used to provide emergency medical services and marine search and rescue response.

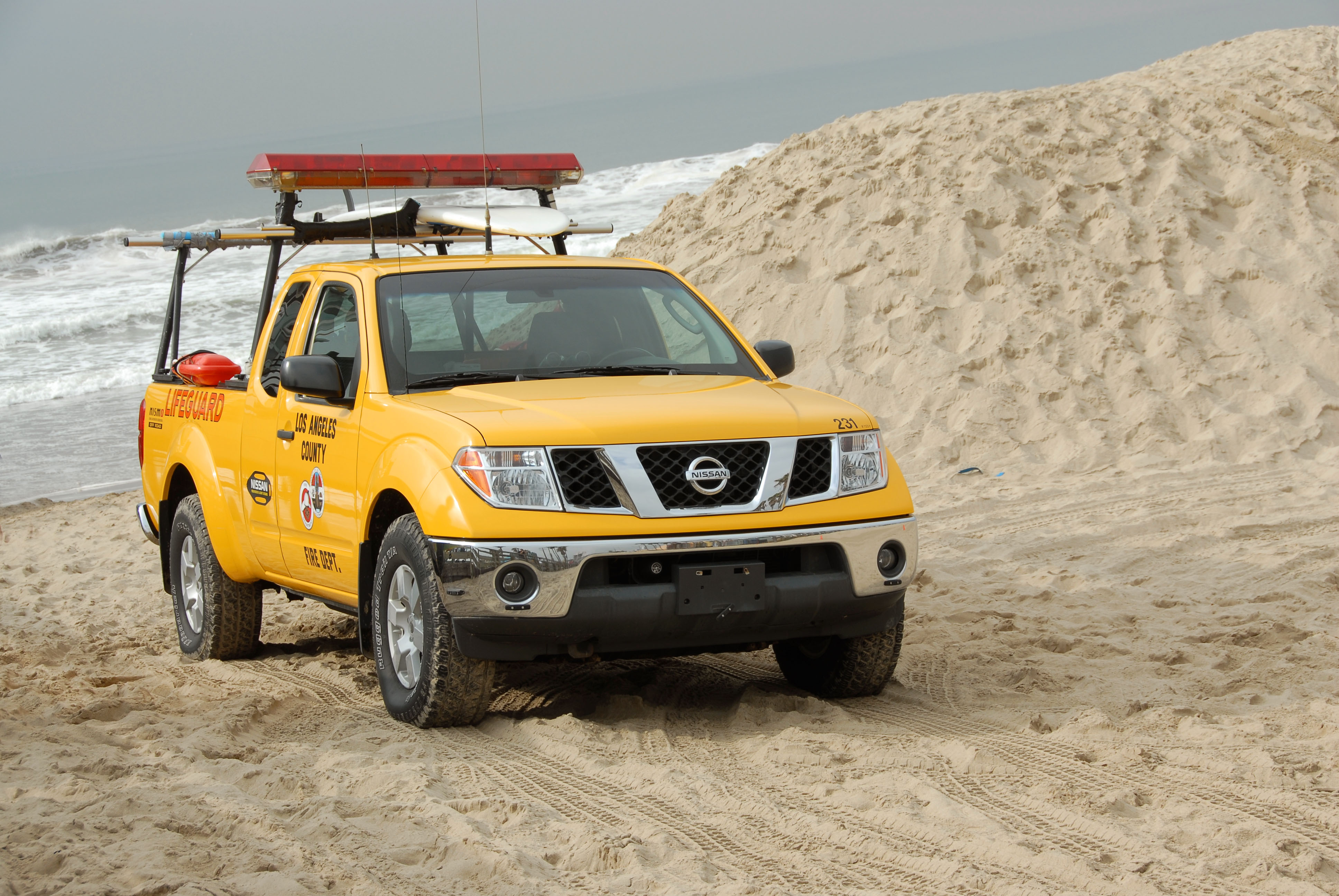
LA County Lifeguards Nissan Frontier

=== Vehicles ===
- Ford Escape Hybrid (2008–2014)
- Ford Ranger (1994–2002)
- Ford Expedition
- Ford F-350 Super Duty
- Nissan Frontier (2003–2008)
- Toyota Tacoma (2015–present)
- Toyota Tundra (2015–present)
- Toyota Sequoia (2015–present)

All Toyota Tacoma trucks are currently assigned a sectional beach in Los Angeles County since deploying its new vehicle since 2015.

== Lifeguard uniforms ==
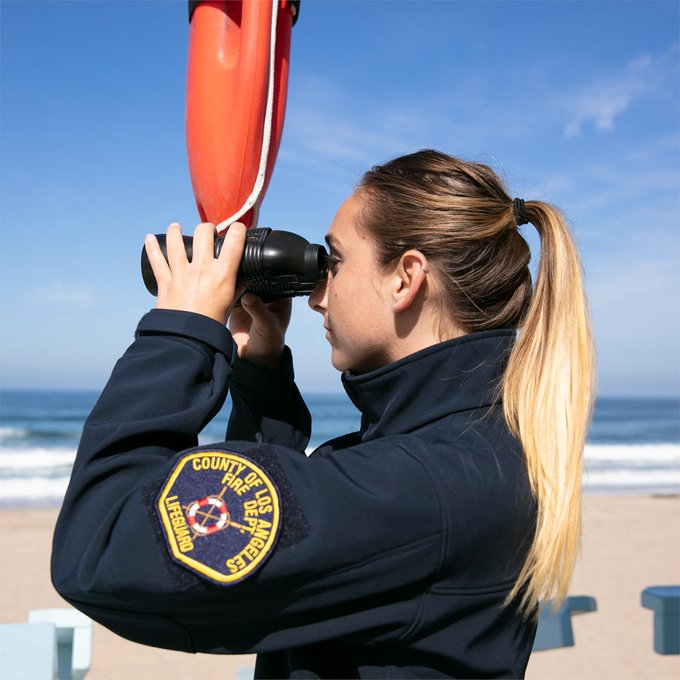
LA County Lifeguard wearing uniform

The following categories of lifeguard clothing in sufficient quantities to fully annually outfit 760 male lifeguards and 136 female lifeguards, which numbers can change each agreement year based upon the workforce composition then in employment, as ordered by the county including the following:

- Short-sleeve and long-sleeve polo shirts;
- Volley swim trunks;
- Board shorts;
- One-piece and two-piece women's swimsuits;
- Micro-fleece with half-zipper;
- Windbreaker pants;
- Baseball caps, knit cap, and floppy hats
- Lightweight windbreaker jackets;
- Heavyweight jackets; and
- Rashguards

== Badges and patches ==
Most lifeguards are wearing a departmental badge that consists of a shield surmounted by a bear, and is silver-colored metal. The words "County of Los Angeles" appear on a ribbon at the top of the badge just under the bear, followed by ribbons with the words "Fire Department" appearing just above the seal of the county. The title of the position of the person is inscribed on a ribbon placed just below the county's seal and the serial number of the badge appears at the bottom of the badge below the title of the position. The words "Ocean Lifeguard Specialist", "Ocean Lifeguard", "Captain" and "Chief" may also appear on the face of badges issued to employees or retired employees authorized by the Fire Department and board of supervisors to carry such badges.

=== Shoulder patches ===
Los Angeles County lifeguards wear a patch on their left sleeve that reads "County of Los Angeles Fire Dept. Lifeguard". Lifeguards that are licensed as paramedics wear a similar patch that identifies them as such.
