= J. R. Martinez =

American actor (born 1983)

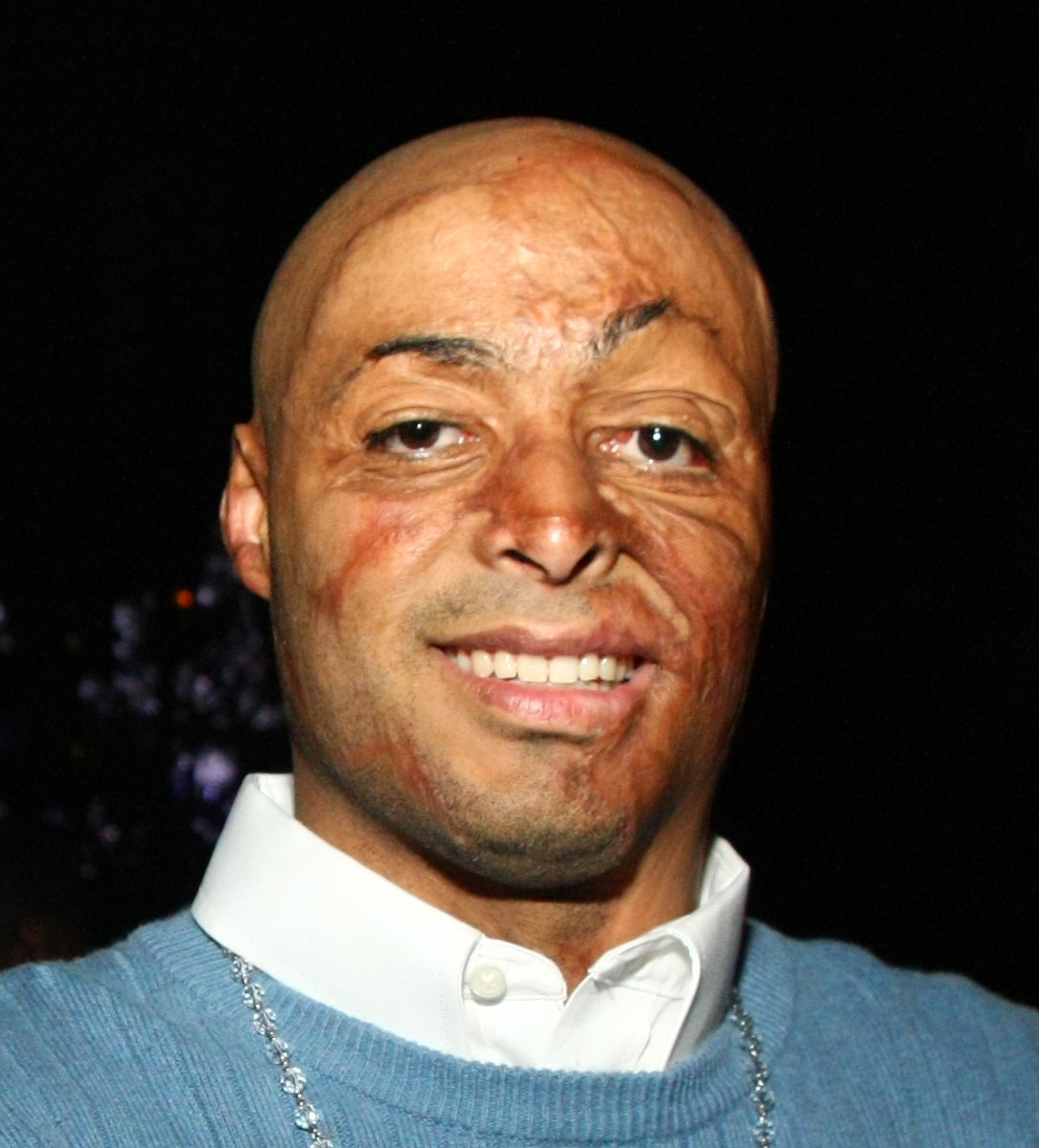
- J. R. Martinez in 2008
- Born: Jose Rene Martinez; June 14, 1983 (age 43); Shreveport, Louisiana, US
- Occupations: Actor motivational speaker soldier (veteran)
- Years active: 2008–present (acting)
- Spouse: Diana Jones (m. 2018)
- Children: 2
- Military career
- Allegiance: United States
- Branch: United States Army
- Service years: 2002–2003
- Rank: SPC
- Conflicts: Iraq War
- Awards: Combat Action Ribbon (Needs Review – Awarded by United States Navy – United States Marine Corps – United States Coast Guard)
- Website: http://www.JRMartinez.com/

Jose Rene Martinez (born June 14, 1983) is an American actor, motivational speaker, and former U.S. Army soldier. Starting in 2008, he played the role of Brot Monroe on the ABC daytime drama All My Children. He is the winner of Season 13 of ABC's Dancing with the Stars. Martinez served as the grand marshal of the 2012 Rose Parade. He also costarred on the syndicated action series SAF3.

In 2003, Martinez sustained severe burns to over 34 percent of his body while serving as an Army infantryman in Iraq. Since his recovery, he has traveled around the country speaking about his experiences to corporations, veterans groups, schools, and other organizations.

== Early life ==
Martinez was born in Shreveport, Louisiana, to Maria Zavala. He has two sisters who were raised with his mother's family in El Salvador. His sister Anabel died before Martinez ever had the chance to meet her. Martinez has never met his father. At a young age, he moved with his mother to Hope, Arkansas. At 17, just prior to his senior year of high school, they moved to Dalton, Georgia.

== Career ==
=== Military career ===
In September 2002, Martinez enlisted in the Army and underwent Basic and Advanced Training at Fort Benning, Georgia, where, upon his graduation, was assigned the Military Occupational Specialty (MOS) of 11B (Infantryman). After reporting to Fort Campbell in January 2003, he was assigned to Delta Company, 2nd Battalion, 502nd Infantry Regiment of the 101st Airborne Division.

In February 2003, he was deployed to the Middle East. Two months later, Martinez was driving a Humvee when its left front tire hit an IED; Martinez suffered smoke inhalation and severe burns to more than 34 percent of his body. He was evacuated to Ramstein AB, Germany, for immediate care and transferred to the Army Institute of Surgical Research Burn Center at Brooke Army Medical Center (BAMC) in San Antonio, Texas. He spent 34 months at BAMC and has undergone 33 plastic surgery and skin graft surgeries.

=== Motivational speaking ===
Martinez has become a motivational speaker. In 2008, he was honored as a "Shining Star of Perseverance" by the WillReturn Council of Assurant Employee Benefits. The following year, the nonprofit Iraq and Afghanistan Veterans of America (IAVA) presented him with the Veterans Leadership Award.

=== Acting career ===
In 2008, Martinez was cast in ABC's daytime drama All My Children as Brot Monroe. His character also served with the Army in Iraq and was injured in combat. Martinez first appeared on the program on Friday, November 7, 2008. In 2012, he appeared on the season six finale of Army Wives as a physical therapist treating injured veterans. In 2013, he began on the syndicated SAF3 portraying a Los Angeles County Firefighter/Paramedic and veteran USAF Pararescue Jumper Alfonso Rivera.

=== Work with burn-survivor community ===
Martinez first began providing support to fellow burn survivors while being treated for his burn injuries at Brooke Army Medical Center. He has served as a member of the board of directors of The Phoenix Society for Burn Survivors. He first attended the Phoenix Society's World Burn Congress in 2008 and was a featured speaker at the 2010 World Burn Congress. Martinez had a fellow burn survivor, Jenna Bullen, attend taping of "Dancing with the Stars" as his guest and has taped a public service announcement with her on behalf of the Phoenix Society for Burn Survivors. Martinez is also active with "Operation Finally Home", an organization that builds housing for American veterans and their families so they may live mortgage-free. Said Martinez of the project: “We’re not just giving them keys to open up the door to go into their home. We’re also giving them the key to opportunity, the key to know there are people who appreciate them, the key to positivity, the key to new beginnings.”

=== Dancing with the Stars ===
Martinez often tells the story of how his mother helped him relearn to walk eight weeks after major foot surgery. Martinez's win also marked the first win for his partner, Karina Smirnoff. He credits her with pushing him to excel in routine after routine leading him to win the competition.

Week #	Dance/Song	Judges' score			Result
Week #	Dance/Song	Inaba	Goodman	Tonioli	Result
1	Viennese Waltz/ "Breakaway"	8	7	7	Safe
2	Jive/"Jump, Jive An' Wail!"	7	7	8	Safe
3	Rumba/"If You're Reading This"	9	8	9	Safe
4	Foxtrot/Theme from "The Pink Panther"	8	9	9	Safe
5	Samba/"Conga"	9	9	10	Safe
6	Quickstep/"Hot Honey Rag" from Chicago	10	9	10	Safe
7	Tango/Theme from "Ghostbusters"	9	8	8	Safe
7	Team Tango/"Disturbia"	8	7	8	Safe
8	Waltz/"What the World Needs Now"	10	10	10	Safe
8	Jive/"Tutti Fruiti"	10	10	10	Safe
9	Paso Doble/"Theme from The Legend of Zorro"	8	7	8	Last to be called Safe
9	Argentine Tango/"Bust Your Windows"	9	9	9	Last to be called Safe
9	Cha-Cha-Cha Relay/"I Like How It Feels"	Awarded	6	Points	Last to be called Safe
10	Cha-Cha-Cha/"Let's Get Loud"	8	7	9	WINNER
10	Freestyle/"Whine Up"	10	10	10	WINNER
10	Jive/"Jump, Jive An' Wail!"	Awarded	28	Points	WINNER
10	Samba/"Shake Your Bon-Bon"	10	10	10	WINNER

=== Radio ===
Martinez's first appearance as a radio host was December 21, 2012, when he stood in for Bill Carroll of KFI-AM 640. On January 24, 2013, he began his regularly scheduled radio show on Sunday evenings.

=== Podcasting ===
In May 2025, Pushkin Industries announced that Martinez would be taking over as host of "Medal of Honor: Stories of Courage," a podcast that tells the stories of recipients of the Medal of Honor.

Awards and achievements
Preceded by Hines Ward & Kym Herjavec	Dancing with the Stars (US) winners Season 13 (Fall 2011 with Karina Smirnoff)	Succeeded by Donald Driver and Peta Murgatroyd
