= Rail to Rail =

Rail trail in Los Angeles County, California

Rail to Rail Active Transportation Corridor Project
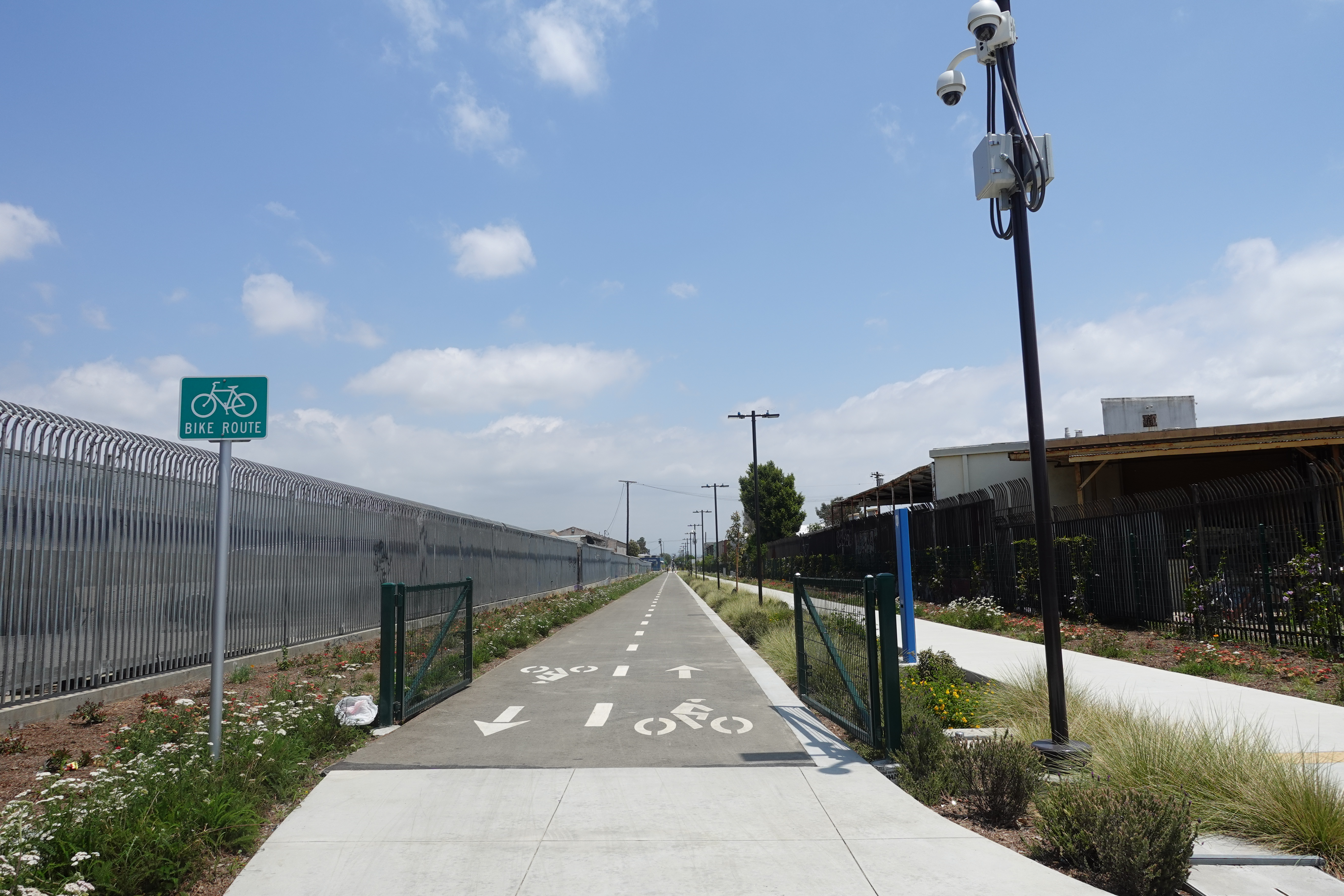
- Length: 5.5 mi (8.9 km)
- Location: Los Angeles County, California, United States
- Established: May 17, 2025
- Trailheads: Fairview Heights station Santa Fe and Slauson Avenues
- Use: Commute, recreation
- Surface: Concrete, asphalt
- Right of way: Harbor Subdivision

Trail map
- Segment A highlighted in green, B highlighted in purple

The Rail to Rail Active Transportation Corridor Project constructed a rail trail in Los Angeles County, California, United States. It was constructed and is owned by Los Angeles Metro.

The 5.5-mile (8.9 km) route, known as Segment A, runs through the city of Inglewood, the city of Los Angeles neighborhoods of Hyde Park, Chesterfield Square, Harvard Park, Vermont-Slauson, South Park and Central-Alameda, and unincorporated Florence-Graham. The route begins at the K Line's Fairview Heights station, connecting it with the J Line's Slauson station and the A Line's Slauson station before terminating at the intersection of Santa Fe and Slauson Avenues. The path uses the Harbor Subdivision freight train right of way along Slauson Avenue and Hyde Park Boulevard. The "active transportation corridor" is a 30-foot (9.1 m)-wide linear park. Construction on the path broke ground on July 6, 2022. The path opened on May 17, 2025, following a dedication ceremony and community fair hosted by Metro that morning, costing $166 million.

A potential future extension project, the Rail to River Active Transportation Corridor Project, known as Segment B, would run through some combination of Gateway Cities Huntington Park, Vernon, Maywood and Bell to reach the Los Angeles River bike trails.

== Route description ==
Segment A begins at the K Line's Fairview Heights station on the border of Inglewood and the city of Los Angeles. It then briefly heads north along West Boulevard before turning east along 67th Street. Running east, the path meets the Harbor Subdivision right of way and turn northeast to run along it to Slauson Avenue. At Slauson Avenue, the path curves to the northern side of Slauson Avenue and parallels it traveling east, intersecting with the J Line at its Slauson station in the median of the Harbor Freeway (I-110) and the A Line at its Slauson station, before terminating at the intersection of Santa Fe and Slauson Avenues on the border of Vernon and Huntington Park. Along the way, the path runs through the neighborhoods of Hyde Park, Chesterfield Square, Harvard Park, Vermont-Slauson, South Park and Central-Alameda, and unincorporated Florence-Graham.

Segment B will begin at the A Line's Slauson station and curve southeast to follow the La Habra Subdivision right-of-way in between Randolph Street and would run through some combination of Gateway Cities Huntington Park, Vernon, Maywood and Bell to reach the Los Angeles River bike trails.

== See also ==
- Rails with trails
- List of Los Angeles bike paths
