= Brentwood Glen, Los Angeles =

Brentwood Glen
- Neighborhood of Los Angeles
- Brentwood Glen Neighborhood sign below 405 freeway
- Interactive map of Brentwood Glen
- Coordinates: 34.066561°N 118.461547°W
- Country: United States
- State: California
- County: Los Angeles
- City: Los Angeles
- Time zone: UTC-8 (PST)
  - Summer (DST): UTC-7 (PDT)
- ZIP Code: 90049

Brentwood Glen is a neighborhood in the Brentwood area of Los Angeles, California.

== Location ==
The community is situated between the West Los Angeles Veterans Center and Sepulveda Boulevard, south of Sunset Boulevard.

== History ==
In the early 1920s four Ratteree Brothers-Judge Earnest Ratteree, Dr. Ira Ratteree, James Ratteree and Allan Ratteree-bought a walnut grove now known as Brentwood Glen. They came from the south, spending most of their time in Arkansas and South Carolina before arriving in Los Angeles.

The Ratterees divided their land into five parcels, referred to as the Ratteree Tract, and filed for subdivision in the mid-1920s. They named all the streets as they stand today, but they did not market the property until after the onset of the Great Depression.

The streets and sidewalks were poured in 1927. In 1932, Harold and Helen Ives built the first house at 11344 Albata Street. It is still the original structure. The majority of the houses were constructed between 1935 and 1942. One of the original pepper trees was still in front of 11346 Montana Ave up until its removal in 2011.

A residents' meeting on May 20, 1957, chose the name Brentwood Glen. In the same year, a half-mile frontage road which bore the name Sepulveda Boulevard on the west side of the San Diego Freeway between Ovada Place and Waterford Street was renamed Brentwood Glen.

The southbound on-ramp and sound wall were created in 1975 and 1976. After a bus accident in 1994, the Waterford off-ramp was closed. The on-ramp was later closed as well.

Today, Brentwood Glen is home to 560 dwellings consisting mostly of single family homes, with some duplexes, triplexes, and multiple-unit apartments.

== Education ==
Brentwood Glen is part of the Los Angeles Unified School District. Zoned schools include Kenter Canyon Charter Elementary School, Paul Revere Charter Middle School, and Palisades Charter High School.

== See also ==
- Brentwood Circle, Los Angeles
- Crestwood Hills, Los Angeles
