= Victory Heights =

Victory Heights may refer to:

Australia

- Victory Heights, Queensland, suburb of Gympie
- Victory Heights, Western Australia, suburb of Kalgoorlie

United States

- Victory Heights, Seattle, neighbourhood
- Victory Heights, Wisconsin, unincorporated community

== See also ==
- Victor Heights, Los Angeles
