= Manchester Square, Los Angeles =

Manchester Square
- Neighborhood of Los Angeles
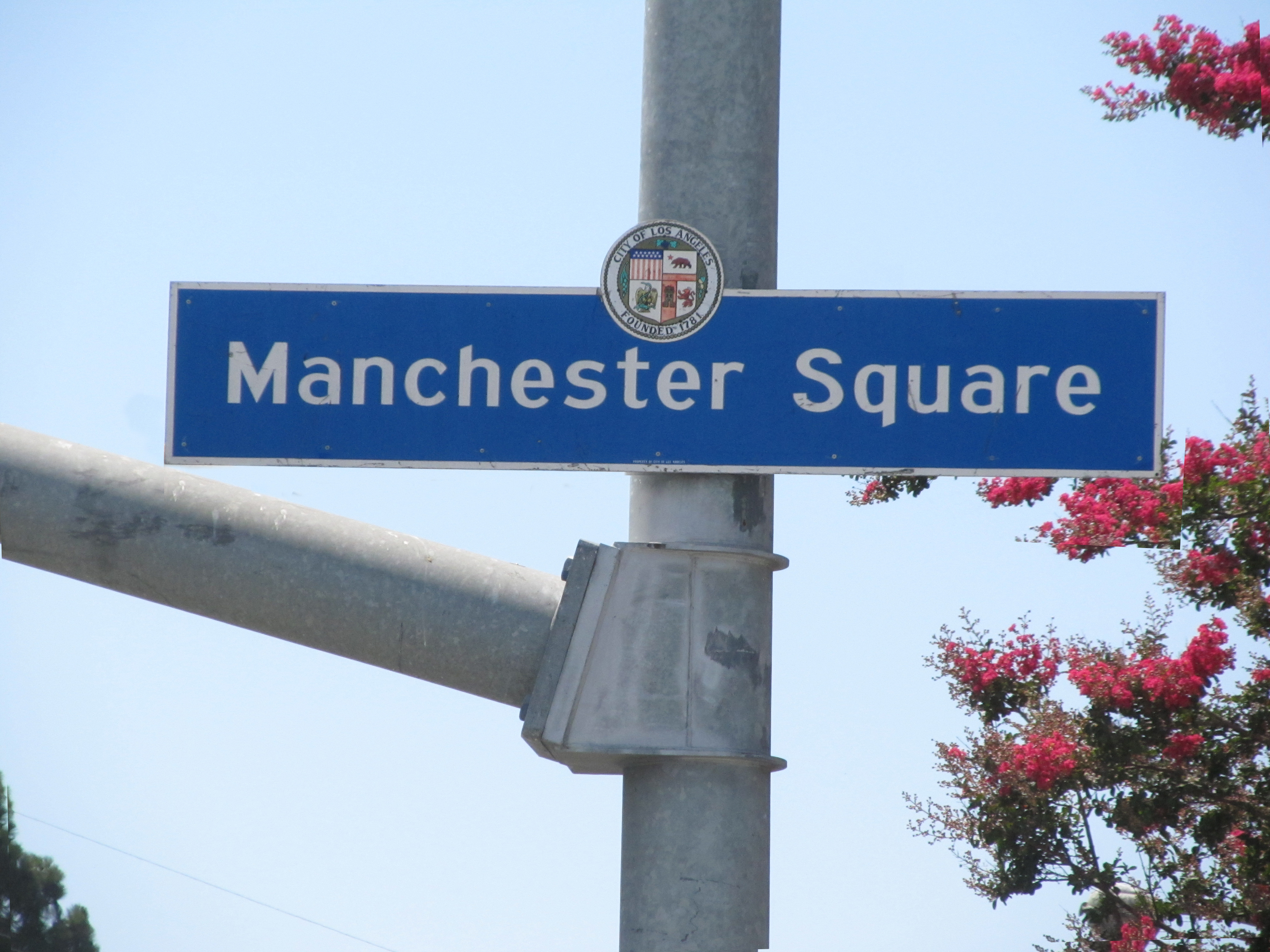
- Manchester Square city sign located at Vermont Avenue and 83rd Street

- Location within Central Los Angeles
- Coordinates: 33°58′02″N 118°18′33″W
- Country: United States
- State: California
- County: Los Angeles
- Time zone: Pacific
- Zip Code: 90047
- Area code: 323

Manchester Square is a neighborhood in Los Angeles, California, within the South Los Angeles region.

== Geography ==
By City Council action of October 2001 (C.F. #01-1874), Manchester Square was officially designated as being bounded by the following streets: West Florence Avenue on the north, South Normandie Avenue Avenue on the east, West Manchester Avenue on the south and South Western Avenue on the west.

The City Council expanded the neighborhood on February 26, 2002, to include the following area: West 83rd Street on the north, South Vermont Avenue on the east, Manchester Avenue on the south and Normandie Avenue on the west.

The Department of Transportation was instructed to install signage at the following intersections: Western Avenue at 85th Street, Normandie Avenue at 73rd Street, Florence Avenue at Hobart Boulevard Manchester Avenue at Normandie Avenue, 83rd Street at South Normandie Avenue and westbound Manchester Avenue at South Normandie Avenue.

According to the Los Angeles Times Mapping L.A. project, Manchester Square is bounded by Florence Avenue on the north, Normandie Avenue on the east, Manchester Boulevard on the south and South Van Ness Avenue on the west. It is flanked by Chesterfield Square and Harvard Park on the north, Vermont Knolls on the east, Gramercy Park on the south and Inglewood and Hyde Park on the west.

== Demographics ==
The following data applies to Manchester Square within the boundaries set by Mapping L.A.:

A total of approximately 11,594 people lived in Manchester Square's 1.01 square miles, according to the 2000 U.S. census—averaging 11,448 people per square mile, about the same as the population density in the city as a whole. The median age was 34, about the same as the rest of the city. The percentages of residents aged 11 to 18 and 65 and above were among the county's highest.

Within the neighborhood, black people made up 78.6% of the population, with Latinos at 19.2%, white people 1.7%, Asian 0.3% and other 0.3%. These figures placed Manchester Square as the fourth-blackest community in Los Angeles County. Mexico and Guatemala were the most common places of birth for the 13.2% of the residents who were born abroad, considered a low percentage of foreign-born when compared with the city or county as a whole.

The $46,093 median household income in 2008 dollars was considered average for the city but low for the county. The percentage of households earning $20,000 or less was high, compared to the county at large. The average household size of 2.7 people was average for both the city and the county. Renters occupied 43% of the housing units, and homeowners occupied the rest.

In 2000, there were 743 families headed by single parents, or 25.6%, a rate that was high for the county and the city. There were 846 veterans, or 10.5% of the population, considered high when compared with the city overall. The percentages of veterans who served in World War II, Korea or Vietnam was among the county's highest.

Manchester Square residents with a four-year degree amounted to 11.7% of the population aged 25 and older in 2000, which was a low figure when compared with the city and the county at large; nevertheless, the percentage of those residents with a high school diploma and some college was high for the county.

== Education ==
There is one school between Van Ness and Western avenues, outside the boundaries set by the City of Los Angeles, but within those of Mapping L.A.

- Seventy-Fourth Street Elementary School, LAUSD, 2112 West 74th Street

== Parks and Recreation ==
- Circle Park is located at 76th St. and South Gramercy Place.

== See also ==
- List of districts and neighborhoods in Los Angeles
