= Green Meadows, Los Angeles =

Green Meadows
- Neighborhood of Los Angeles
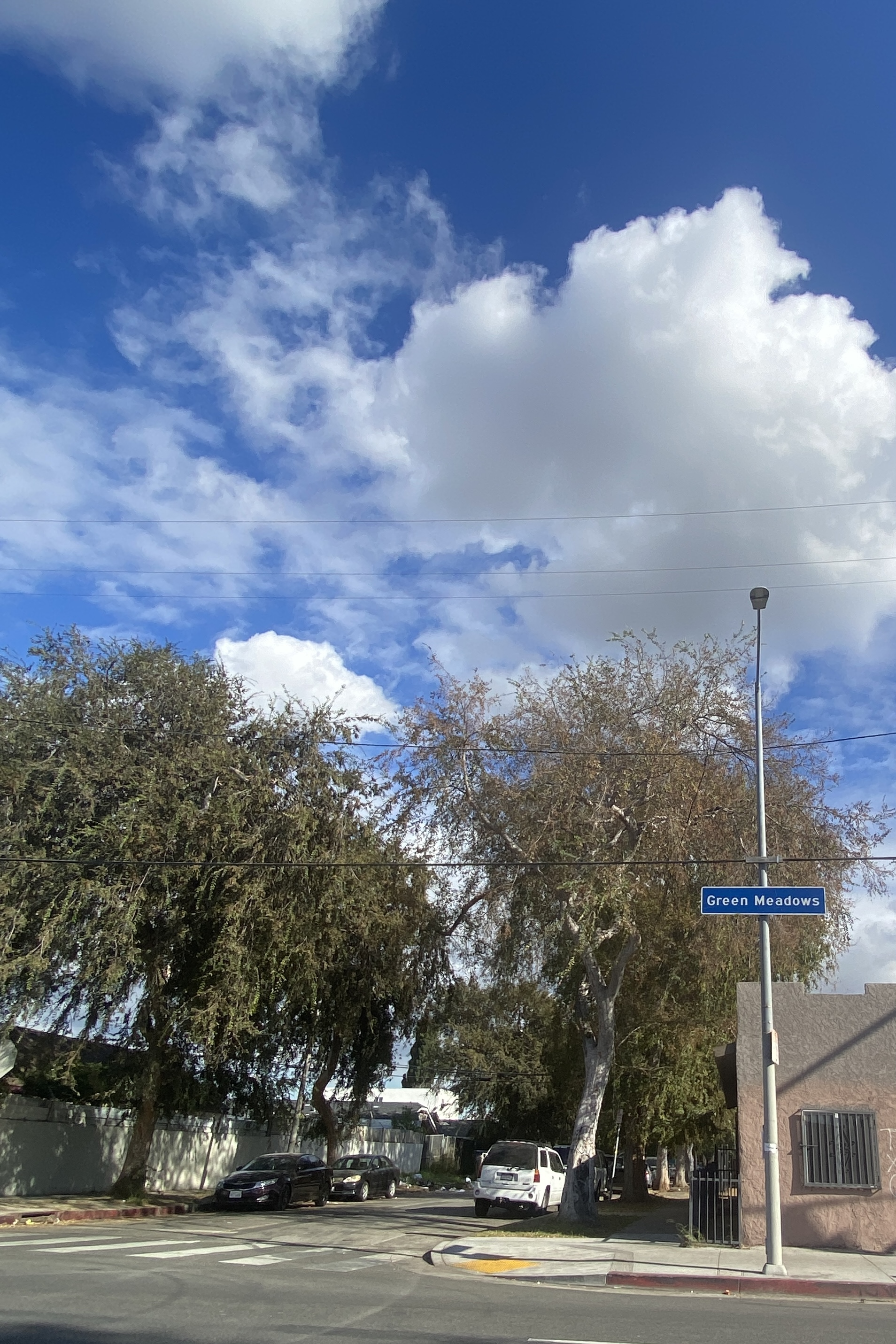

- Location within Central Los Angeles
- Coordinates: 33.954580°N 118.269346°W
- Country: United States
- State: California
- County: Los Angeles
- City: Los Angeles
- Time zone: Pacific
- Zip Code: 90061
- Area code: 323

Green Meadows is a neighborhood in South Los Angeles, California, with a population of more than thirty thousand people. Green Meadows is within the South Los Angeles Community Plan area and is the home of Locke College Preparatory Academy.

== Unincorporated era ==
Known as an agricultural and dairying area in the 19th century, Green Meadows was an unincorporated area seven miles south of Los Angeles on the road leading to Wilmington. Known for its dark loamy soil, with a high percentage of humus; according to one government report, "Dairying and the raising of corn, alfalfa, and walnuts are practiced in the neighborhood of Green Meadows." According to the Los Angeles Times of that era:

The rich alfalfa fields watered from artesian wells furnish abundant food for stock, and the finest butter and milk come from this section. The district has recently spent $800 in fitting up their schoolhouse, which is one of the best in the rural district. The building is used for religious purposes on Sundays. Green Meadows prides itself on its fine apples, which are equal to any raised in California.

On New Year's Day, 1887, it was noted that new arrivals had settled to the west, "on the mesa, where several wells have been bored for domestic use at the depth of about 95 feet, with a raise of the water to within about 40 feet of the surface, and the remaining distance to be pumped by windmills."

Green Mountain was at times considered to be a part of the district of Florence, California. In 1887 the Green Mountain School had 85 pupils. In 1897 the community had a Public Hall, where a concert was given. The community was the site of the Ascot Park race track at the corner of Central and Florence avenues; it opened as a horse track in 1903 and became a motor speedway in 1904. It closed in 1919.

Green Meadows (3.57 square miles) was annexed to the city of Los Angeles effective March 18, 1926.

== City of Los Angeles ==
=== Geography ===
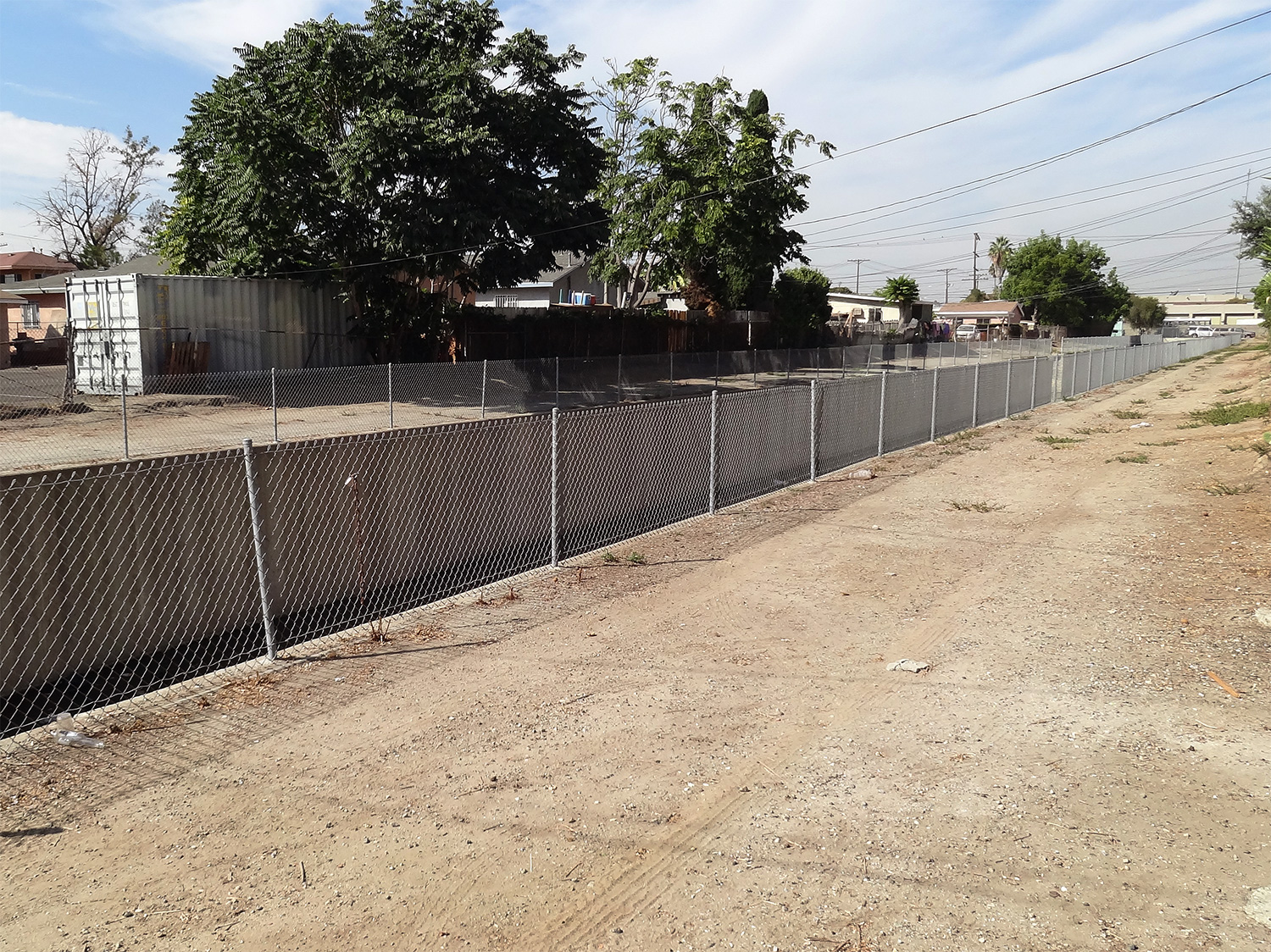
Compton Creek from Wall Street, south of East 108th St., Green Meadows

The name "Green Meadows" (which is the original name of the tract) was revived in 2001 as part of an effort by a local advisory committee to give smaller communities an identity separate from South Central, which the area has historically been considered a part of. Despite this, the name is scarcely used, even by residents, and there is little green in the neighborhood.

According to the Los Angeles Times Mapping L.A. project, the Green Meadows neighborhood touches Florence on the north, Florence-Firestone on the northeast, Watts on the east, Willowbrook on the south, Broadway-Manchester on the west, Vermont Knolls to the northwest and Athens to the southwest. It is bounded by Firestone Boulevard on the north, Central Avenue on the east, the Los Angeles city boundary on the south and South San Pedro Street on the west. In the first version of Mapping L.A., "Green Meadows" was not mapped as a distinct neighborhood; rather, the area was shown to be part of Historic South-Central Los Angeles.

Compton Creek runs through Green Meadows east–west near 108th Street and north–south near Central Avenue.

=== Population ===
A total of 28,381 residents lived in Green Meadows' 2.22 square miles, according to the 2000 U.S. census — averaging 12,785 people per square mile, among the highest population densities in both the city and the county. The population had increased to 30,558, the city estimated in 2008.

The median age was 24, young for the city and the county, and the percentages of residents younger than age 18 were among the county's highest. There were 1,605 families headed by single parents; the rate of 27.6% was considered high for both the city and the county.

The proportions of Latino and black people in the neighborhood, 54.2% and 44.1%, respectively, were reckoned as a high figure for the county. Other ethnicities were white, 0.6%; Asian, 0.3%; and other, 0.7%. Mexico and El Salvador were the most common places of birth for the 30.2% of the residents who were born abroad, about an average percentage for the city as a whole.

The median household income in 2008 dollars was $31,347, considered low for both the city and county. The percentage of households earning $20,000 or less was high, compared to the county at large. The average household size of 3.7 people was also considered high. Renters occupied 51.6% of the housing units, and homeowners occupied the rest.

=== Education ===
Only 3.6% of Green Meadows residents held a four-year degree, a low percentage for both the city and the county. The percentage of residents age 25 and older with less than a high school diploma was high for the county.

Within the Green Meadows neighborhood are found:

- Maxine Waters Employment Prep Center (LAUSD, adult education), 10925 Central Avenue
- Animo Locke Charter High School (LAUSD), 325 East 111th Street
- Animo Locke Technology High School (LAUSD) 810 E. 111th Place
- Alliance Jack H. Skirball Middle School (LAUSD), 603 E. 115th Street
- Ninety-Third Street Elementary School (LAUSD), 330 E. 93rd Street
- Ninety-Ninth Street Elementary School (LAUSD, 9900 S. Wadsworth Avenue
- One Hundred Ninth Street Elementary School (LAUSD), 10915 S. McKinley Avenue
- One Hundred Sixteenth Street Elementary School (LAUSD), 11610 Stanford Avenue

=== Recreation and parks ===
- Green Meadows Recreation Center, South San Pedro Street between 88th Place and 89th Street
- Earvin Magic Johnson County Recreation Area, 120th Street

=== Transportation ===
- Metro C Line Avalon station
