= Wilshire Park, Los Angeles =

- Neighborhood of Los Angeles
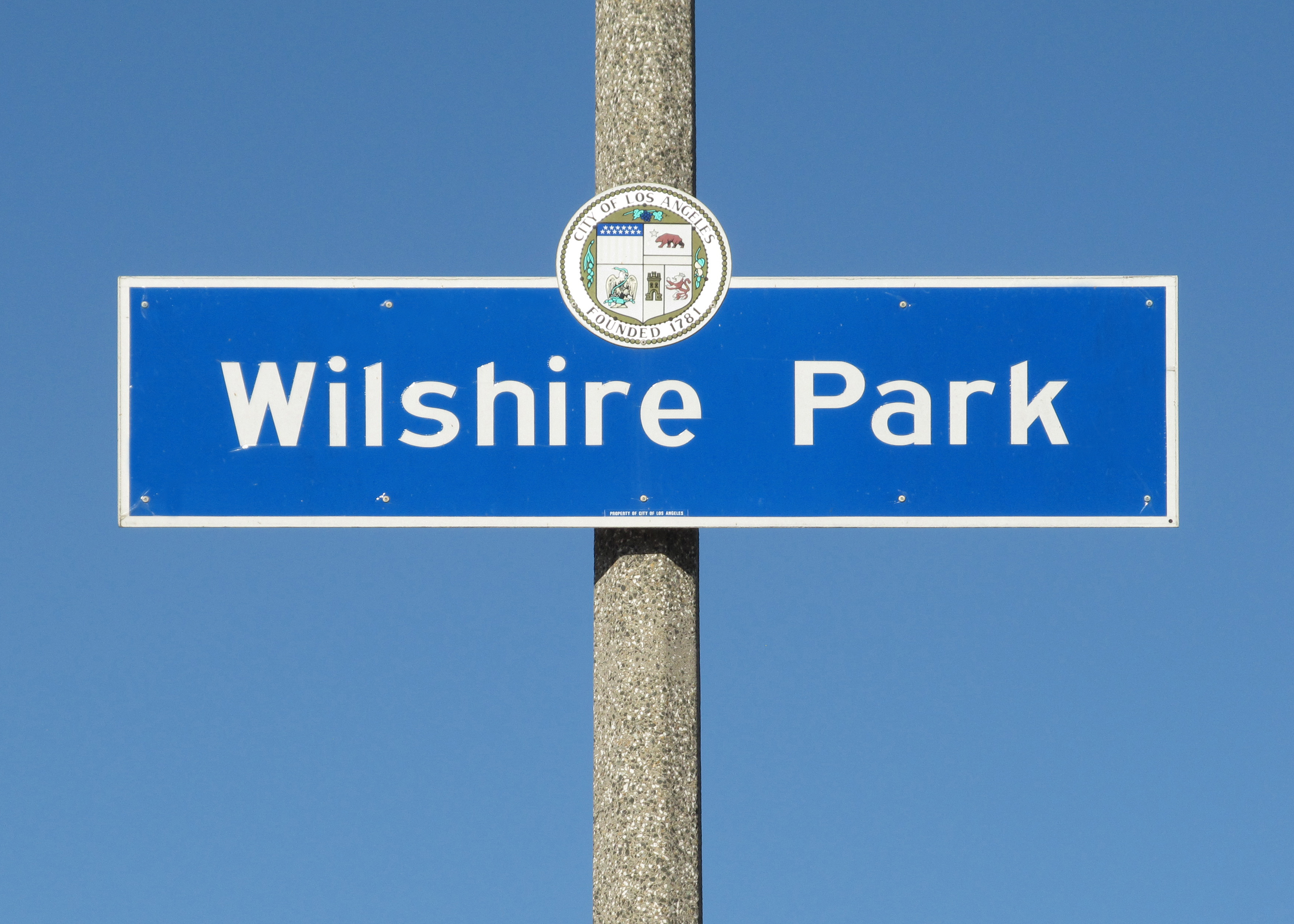
- Wilshire Park neighborhood sign at the intersection of Crenshaw Boulevard and Olympic Boulevard

- Location within Los Angeles
- Coordinates: 34°03′41″N 118°19′18″W
- Country: United States
- State: California
- County: Los Angeles
- Time zone: Pacific
- Zip Code: 90048
- Area code: 323

Wilshire Park is a neighborhood in the Central Los Angeles region of Los Angeles, California.

== Geography ==
The boundaries of Wilshire Park are Wilshire Boulevard on the north, Olympic Boulevard on the south, Wilton Place on the east and Crenshaw Boulevard on the west.

Attempts to rename Wilshire Park as part of the Koreatown district were rebuffed in August 2010, with passage of Los Angeles City Council File 09-0606, officially establishing the western boundary of Koreatown as Western Avenue, nearly 0.5 miles (0.80 km) from the western boundary of Wilshire Park. Wilshire Park is identified in the Thomas Guide on page 633:G:3.

Windsor Square and Hancock Park are to the north, Country Club Park is to the south, Country Club Heights is to the east, Windsor Village, Longwood Highlands and Miracle Mile are to the west. Major thoroughfares include Olympic Boulevard and Crenshaw Boulevard. Most of Wilshire Park is in ZIP code 90005, but also includes a small area of 90019.

== History and landmarks ==
Wilshire Park is a neighborhood of one- and two-story historic Dutch Colonial, Spanish Colonial, American Craftsman, Colonial Revival, Minimal Traditional, and Mediterranean style single-family homes, duplexes, and multi-family homes. on tree-lined streets of mature magnolias, oaks, and sycamores.

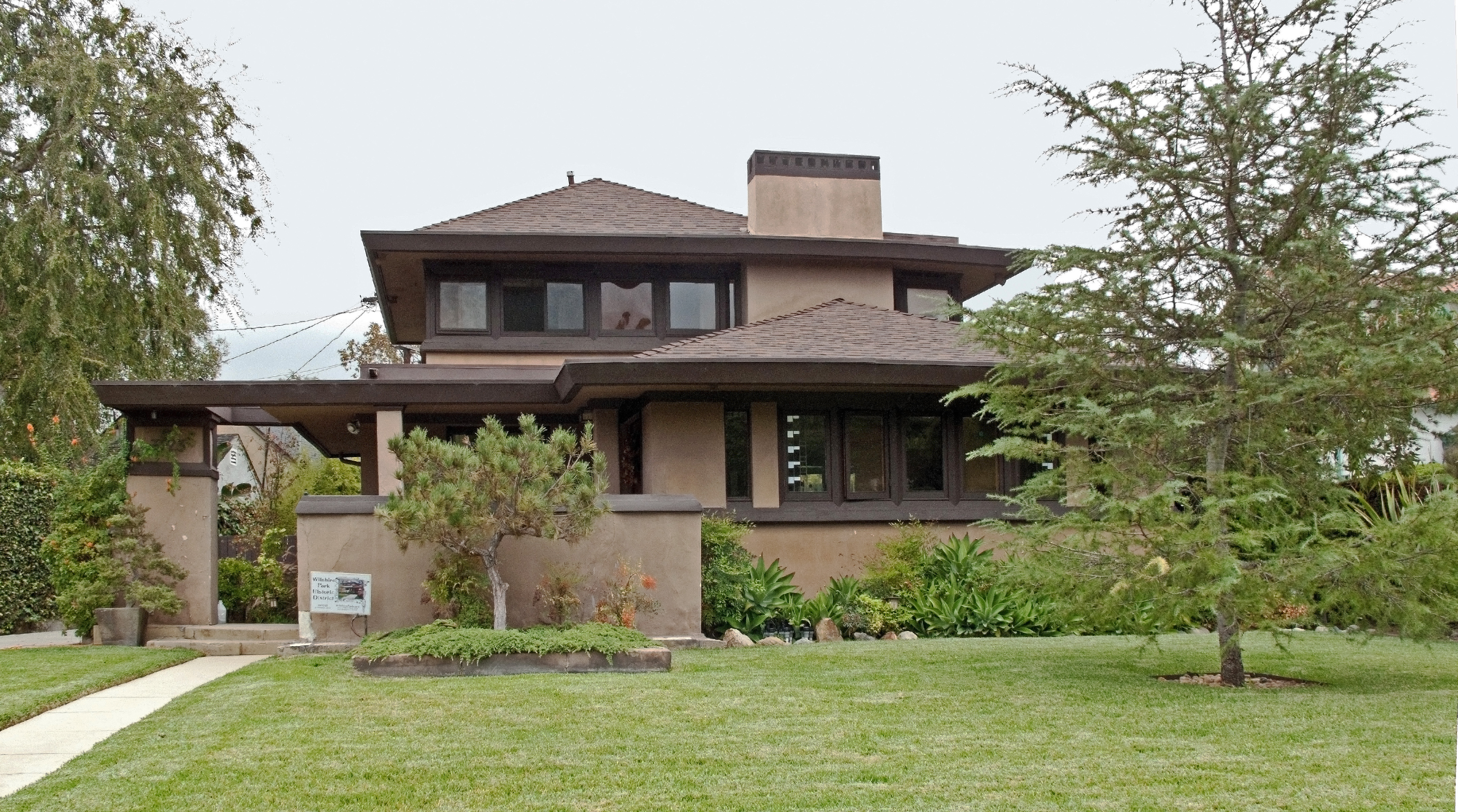
Weber House, designed by Lloyd Wright in 1921.

The first recorded residence in Wilshire Park was built in 1908. The transitional Prairie School style home (right) is an example of the work of architect Lloyd Wright. The neighborhood also features a 1938 apartment complex by the only female architect in Los Angeles at the time, by Edith Mortensen Northman. Most of Wilshire Park was fully built out by 1926. The graph shows the pattern of development.

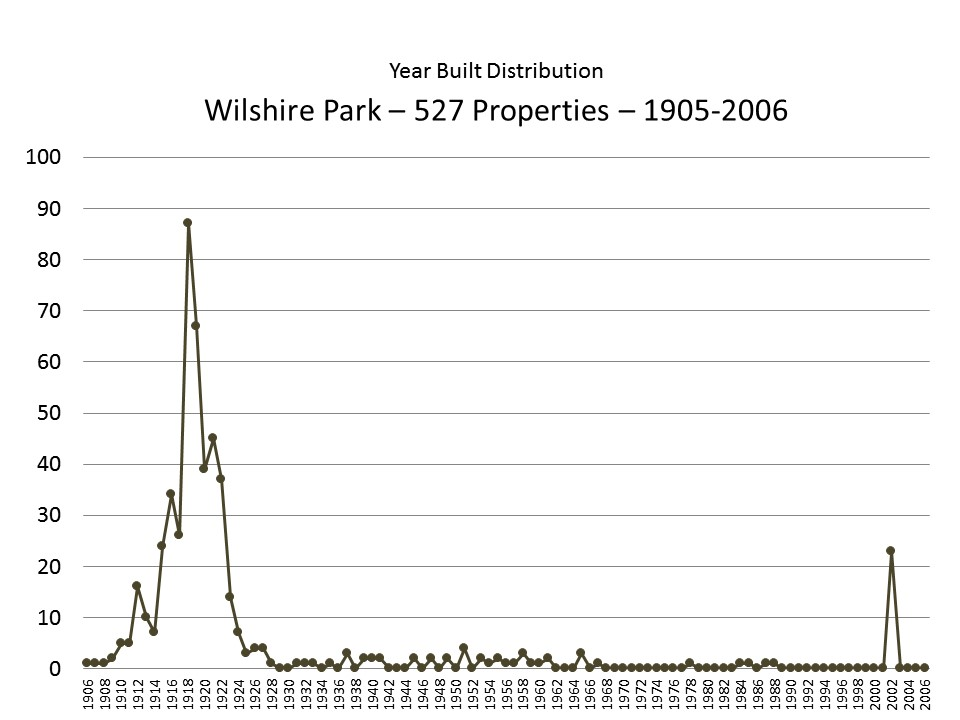
Year-built graph

There are three Wilshire Park homes designated as Los Angeles Historic-Cultural Monuments (LAHCM): the William J. Weber House, pictured above, designed by Lloyd Wright and built in 1921; the A.W. Black Residence, designed by John Frederick Soper and built in 1913; and the William J. Hubbard Residence designed by Allen Kelly Ruoff and Arthur C. Munson, and built in 1923.

The area has served as a film and television production location, dating back to the days of the 1925 Buster Keaton comedy classic Seven Chances. With the 1960s, one Wilshire Park home (at 837 5th Avenue) attained TV immortality by serving as the exterior for the Douglas family home on the long-running series, My Three Sons.

== Police and crime ==
Wilshire Park, with the exception of the block bounded by Wilshire/Crenshaw/8th and Bronson, is covered by Olympic Division, at 1130 South Vermont Avenue.

== Schools ==
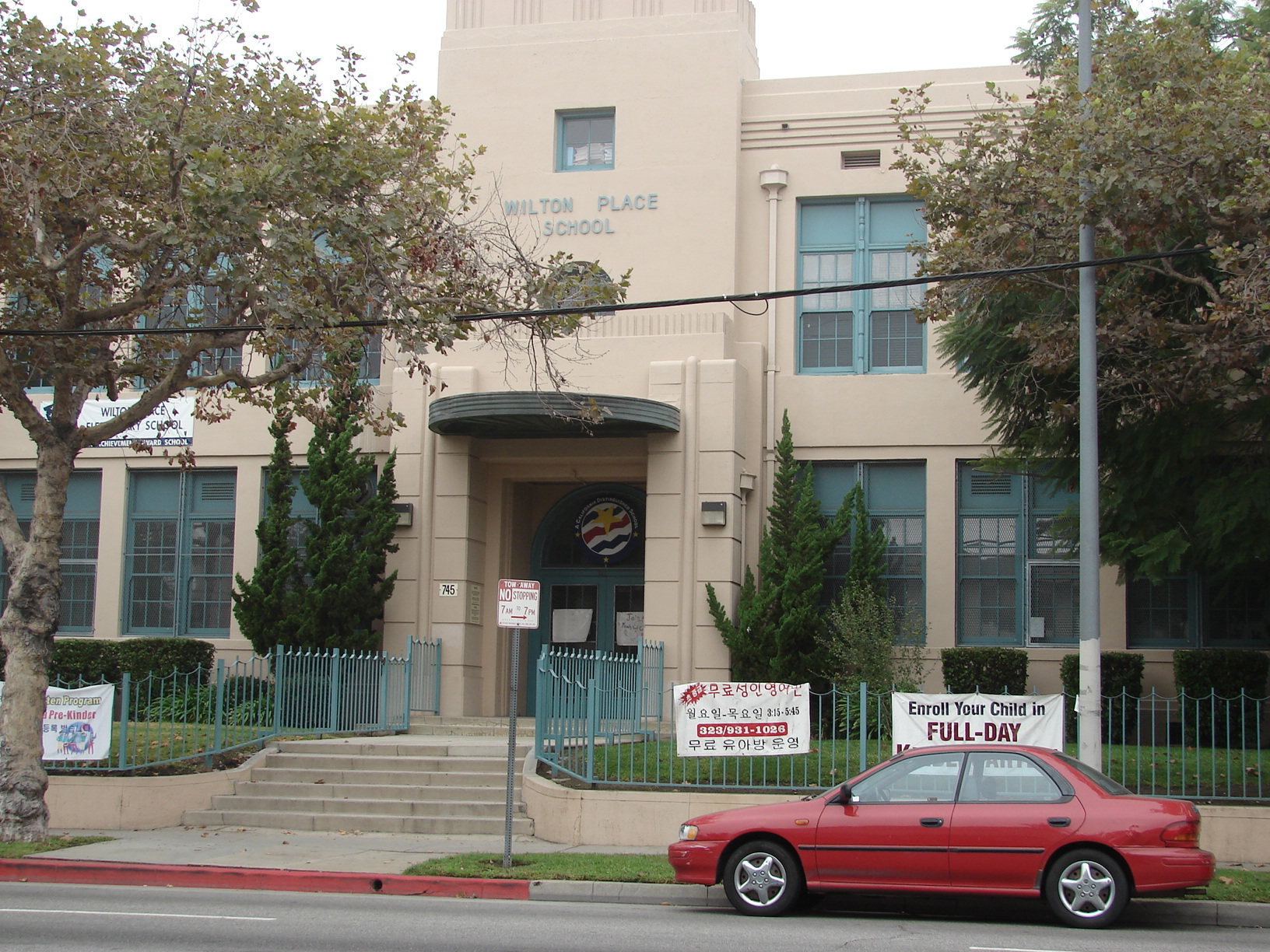
Wilton Place School, Wilton Place between Leeward and 8th Street, 2007

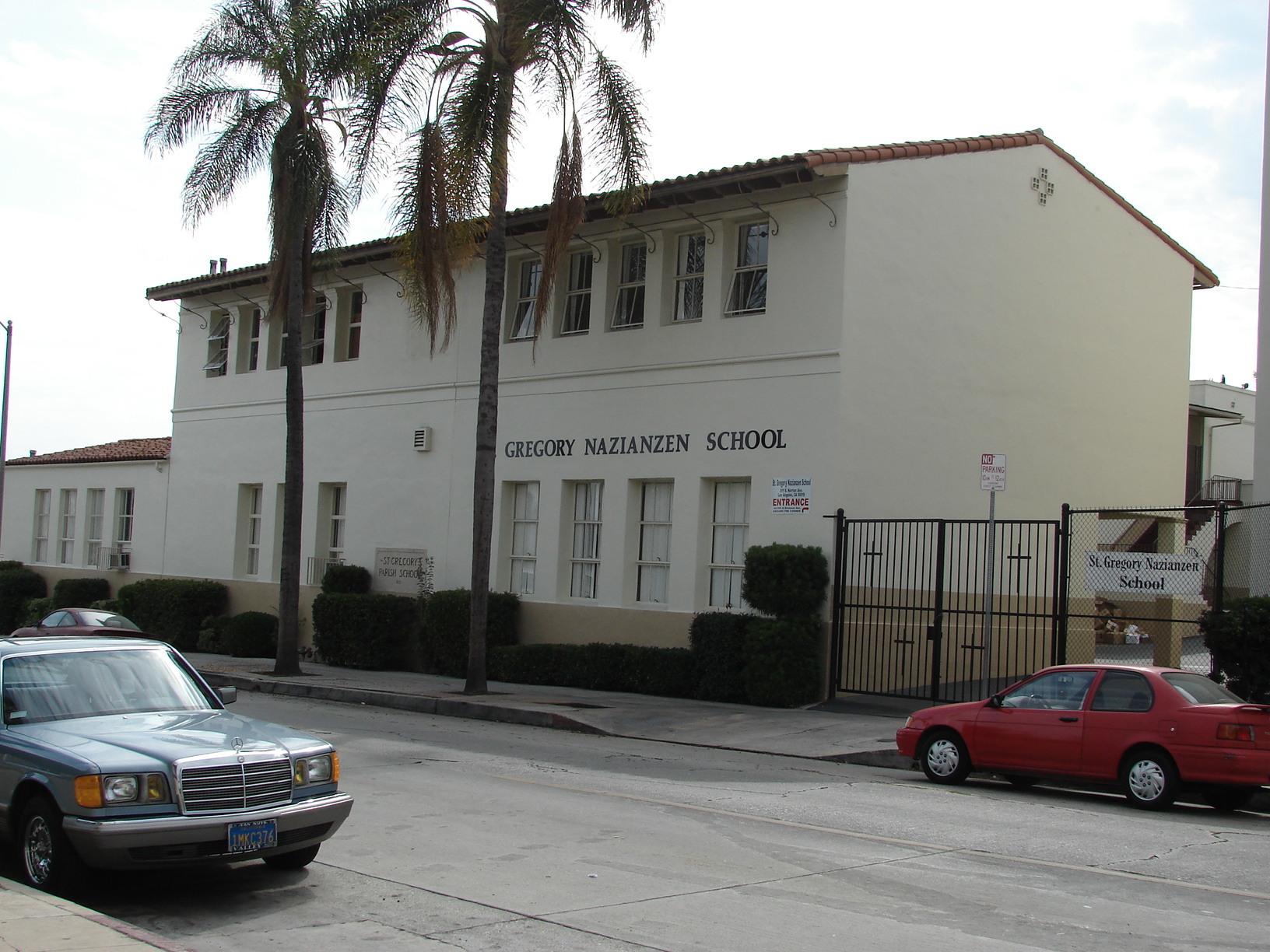
St. Gregory Nazianzen Catholic School, 2007

Wilshire Park has three elementary schools educating approximately 1,500 children: Wilshire Park Elementary, Wilton Place Elementary, and St. Gregory Nazianzen Catholic School.

Wilshire Park School opened in September 2006. Currently there are 550 students enrolled

Wilton Place School was constructed in 1918 to accommodate the new residents following the post-World War I boom. It has a reported enrollment of 780 students.

St. Gregory Nazianzen is a Catholic church owned by the Archdiocese of Los Angeles since 1923. The current cast concrete building and adjacent school were dedicated in 1938, but the area around the intersection of Norton and 9th Street had been operating as a church and school for fifteen years prior.

== Wilshire Park Historic Preservation Overlay Zone ==
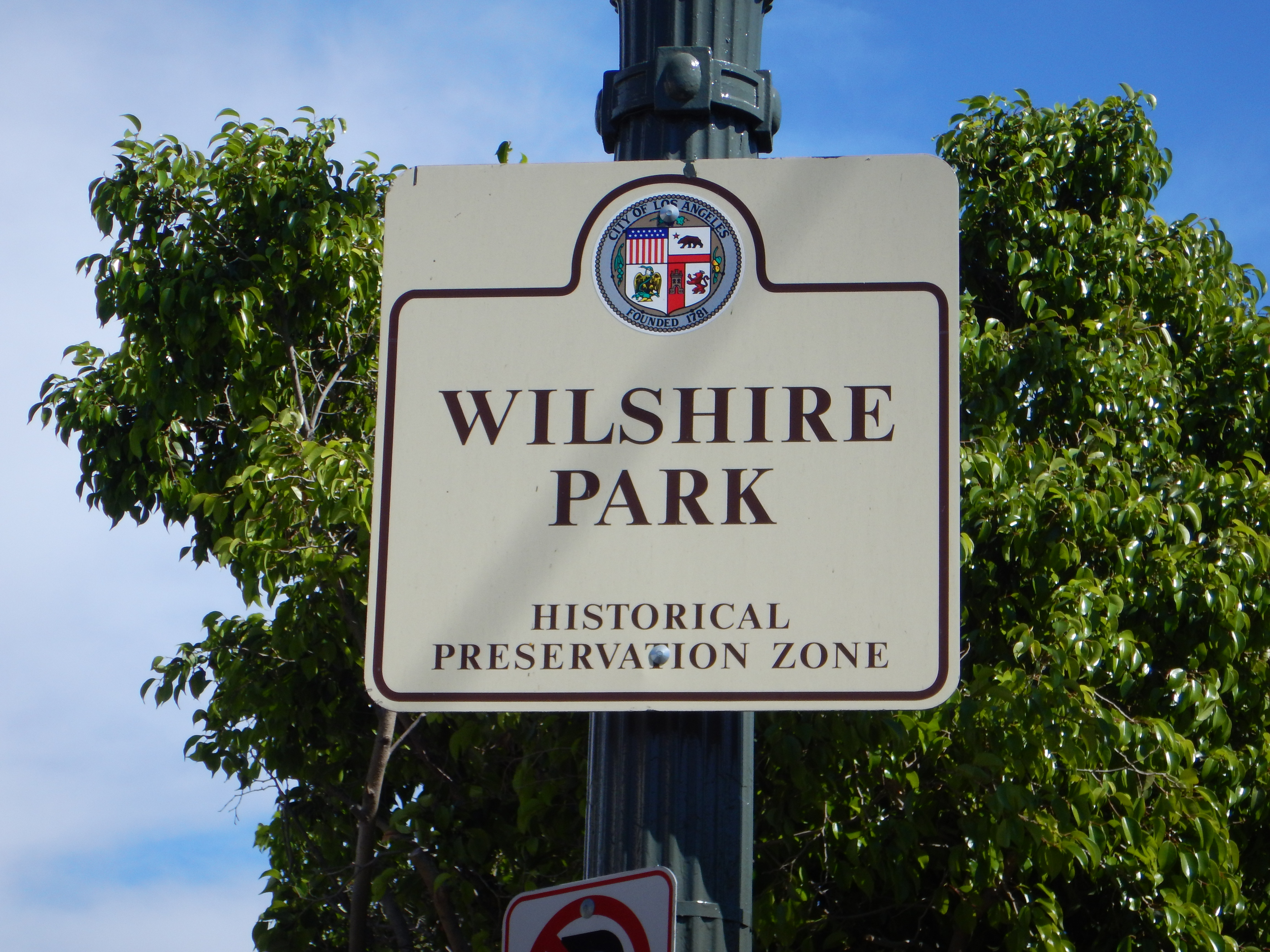
Sign identifying Wilshire Park as an Historic Preservation Overlay Zone by the City of Los Angeles

Wilshire Park was designated a Los Angeles Historic Preservation Overlay Zone (HPOZ) in 2008, by a unanimous vote of the Los Angeles City Council. Since 2002, residents had begun advocating the creation of a Wilshire Park historic district in order to prevent teardowns and to encourage residents to only make exterior changes to their homes consistent with the historical period and architectural style of those homes. Wilshire Park was granted an Interim Control Ordinance on November 13, 2006.

Wilshire Park became the first neighborhood in Los Angeles history in which residents conducted and completed their own survey and analysis of each home and parcel, overseen by a professional architectural consulting group. This Survey of Historic Resources was completely self-funded, utilizing no funds from the city.

The HPOZ was accomplished after years of door-to-door conversations about preservation, the circulation of a pro-HPOZ petition signed by the majority of residents, many outreach meetings involving panel discussions, frequent discussions of preservation in the neighborhood newsletter, dozens of mailings to residents, as well as a 2007 Home and Garden tour fund-raiser sponsored by affiliate neighborhood West Adams. In August, 2008, Wilshire Park Association hosted, at the National Register of Historic Places Art Deco landmark Wiltern Theater, a public meeting for all residents regarding the neighborhood's proposed designation as a Historic District known as a Los Angeles Historic Preservation Overlay Zone. City officials of the Los Angeles Office of Historic Resources held a forum as part of the event attended by over 120 residents at the landmark Ebell of Los Angeles. On November 13, 2008 Wilshire Park was officially designated as an Historic Preservation Overlay Zone.

On October 20, 2010, the ordinance was amended to adopt the Wilshire Park Preservation Plan and establish an HPOZ Board shared with the newly adopted Windsor Village and Country Club Park HPOZs. In an effort to streamline the HPOZ process and to make the HPOZ program financially viable, the "Triplets" agreed to share an HPOZ Board and Preservation Plan, while retaining their own HPOZ ordinances, periods of significance, context statements and identity.

In partnership with Hancock Park, the Wilshire Park Association successfully lobbied the city's planners to impose height limits and mandatory free parking on commercial buildings being constructed on the "Park Mile" in the Mid-Wilshire area, a stretch of Wilshire (between Highland and Wilton) that had been one of the last undeveloped parcels in Mid-Wilshire. The process began in 1983 and was successfully completed in 1987. The blocks of Wilshire Park between Wilshire and 8th Street are part of Park Mile.

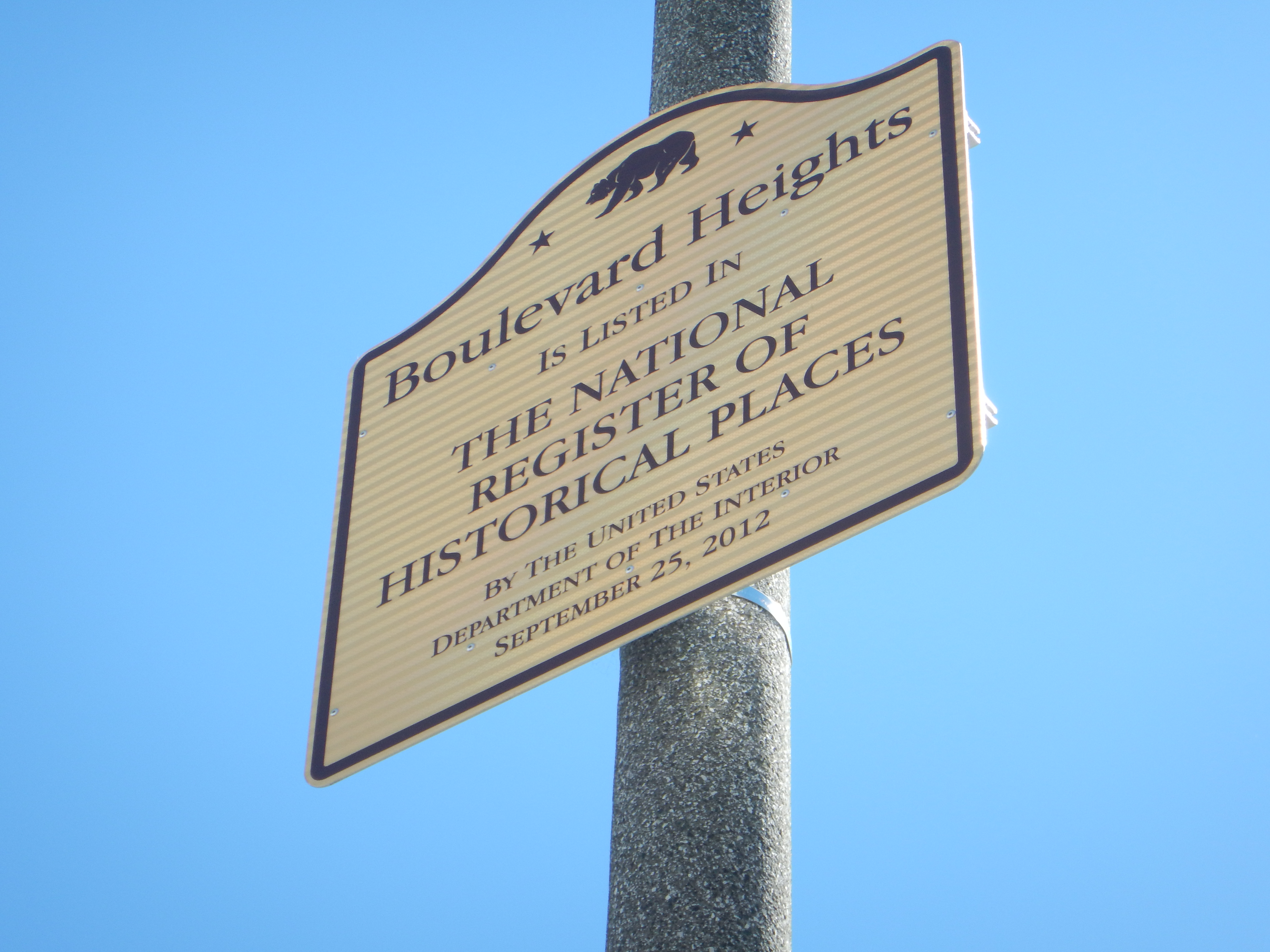
Boulevard Height National Register District Sign

Two blocks of Bronson Avenue between Wilshire and 9th Street were enrolled in 2012 as the Boulevard Heights Historic District in the National Register of Historic Places.

== Community ==
The Wilshire Park Association is an active neighborhood association, with meetings, a newsletter, and a website. The Association consists of owners and renters who work closely with the police and other city organizations in such efforts as traffic abatement, crime prevention, and tree planting.

Wilshire Park is racially diverse, including Caucasian, Hispanic, African-American, and Korean-American residents. The neighborhood is part of Los Angeles City Council District 10 under Councilman David Ryu and is a member of the Greater Wilshire Neighborhood Council.

== See also ==
- List of Los Angeles Historic-Cultural Monuments in the Wilshire and Westlake areas
- Los Angeles City Council District 10
