= Harvard Park, Los Angeles =

Harvard Park
- Neighborhood of Los Angeles
- Location within Central Los Angeles
- Coordinates: 33.9829°N 118.3040°W
- Country: United States of America
- State: California
- County: Los Angeles
- Time zone: Pacific
- Zip Code: 90061
- Area code: 323

Harvard Park is a 0.64-square-mile neighborhood in the South Los Angeles region of Los Angeles, California.

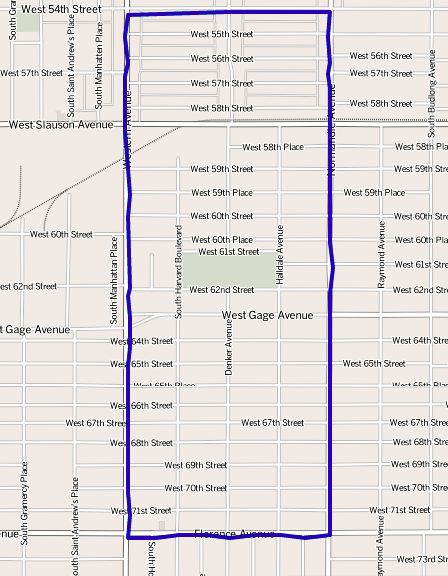
Harvard Park district of the city of Los Angeles, as drawn by the Los Angeles Times

== Demographics ==
A total of 10,297 residents lived in Harvard Park's 0.64 square miles, according to the 2000 U.S. census — averaging 16.072 people per square mile, among the highest population densities in both the city and the county. Its population has grown to 10,888, the city estimated in 2008.

The median age was 28, young for the city and the county, and the percentages of residents younger than age 18 were among the county's highest. There were 504 families headed by single parents; the rate of 24.1% was considered high for both the city and the county.

Within the neighborhood, African Americans made up 48.4% of the population, while Latinos were 48,2%. Other ethnicities were white, 1.8%; Asian, 0.6%; and other, 1.7%. Mexico and El Salvador were the most common places of birth for the 31.2% of the residents who were born abroad, about an average percentage for the city as a whole.

The median household income in 2008 dollars was $37,013, considered low for both the city and county. The percentage of households earning $20,000 or less was high, compared to the county at large. The average household size of 3.3 people was also considered high. Renters occupied 49% of the housing units, and homeowners occupied the rest.

Only 3.6% of Harvard Park residents held a four-year degree, a low percentage for both the city and the county. The percentage of residents age 25 and older with less than a high school diploma was high for the county.

== Geography ==
The Harvard Park neighborhood touches Vermont Square on the north, Vermont-Slauson on the east, Manchester Square on the south, and Chesterfield Square on the west. It is bounded by West 54th Street on the north, Normandie Avenue on the east, Florence Avenue on the south and Western Avenue on the west.

== Recreation and parks ==
- Jackie Tatum/Harvard Recreation Center, 62nd Street between Harvard Boulevard and Halldale Avenue

== See also ==
- List of districts and neighborhoods in Los Angeles
