= Spaulding Square, Los Angeles =

Spaulding Square
- Neighborhood of Los Angeles
- Location within Western Los Angeles
- Coordinates: 34.096128°N 118.357245°W
- Country: United States
- State: California
- County: Los Angeles
- City: Los Angeles
- Time zone: UTC-8 (PST)
  - Summer (DST): UTC-7 (PDT)
- Zip code: 90046

Spaulding Square is a neighborhood in Los Angeles, California.

== History ==
Spaulding Square is named after California architect Albert Starr Spaulding, who purchased the area and subdivided it in 1914. It a neighborhood built between 1916 and 1921. Many of the early residents were actors and technicians from the movie industry.

There are approximately 160 homes In the area. There are Colonial-style bungalows, along some Italian, Renaissance, English, Mediterranean, Spanish, Prairie and Craftsman homes.

One early resident was Rudolph J. Berquist, a cinematographer known for the silent films Camille and One Night in Rome. He built his home at 1400 N Ogden Drive in 1919.

In 1993, Spaulding Square was designated a Historic Preservation Overlay Zone (HPOZ) by the city of Los Angeles, which has helped maintain its character of single-family homes.

== Geography ==
Spaulding Square is bounded by Orange Grove Avenue on the west, Stanley Avenue on the east, Sunset Blvd on the north, and Fountain Avenue on the south.

== In Media ==
Films shot in the neighborhood include:

- Halloween – 1530 N. Orange Grove
- A Nightmare on Elm Street – 428 N. Genese

== Notable residents ==
- Lucille Ball – actress
- Hugo Haas – director
