= 37th Street/USC station =

Bus rapid transit station in Los Angeles, California

37th St/USC
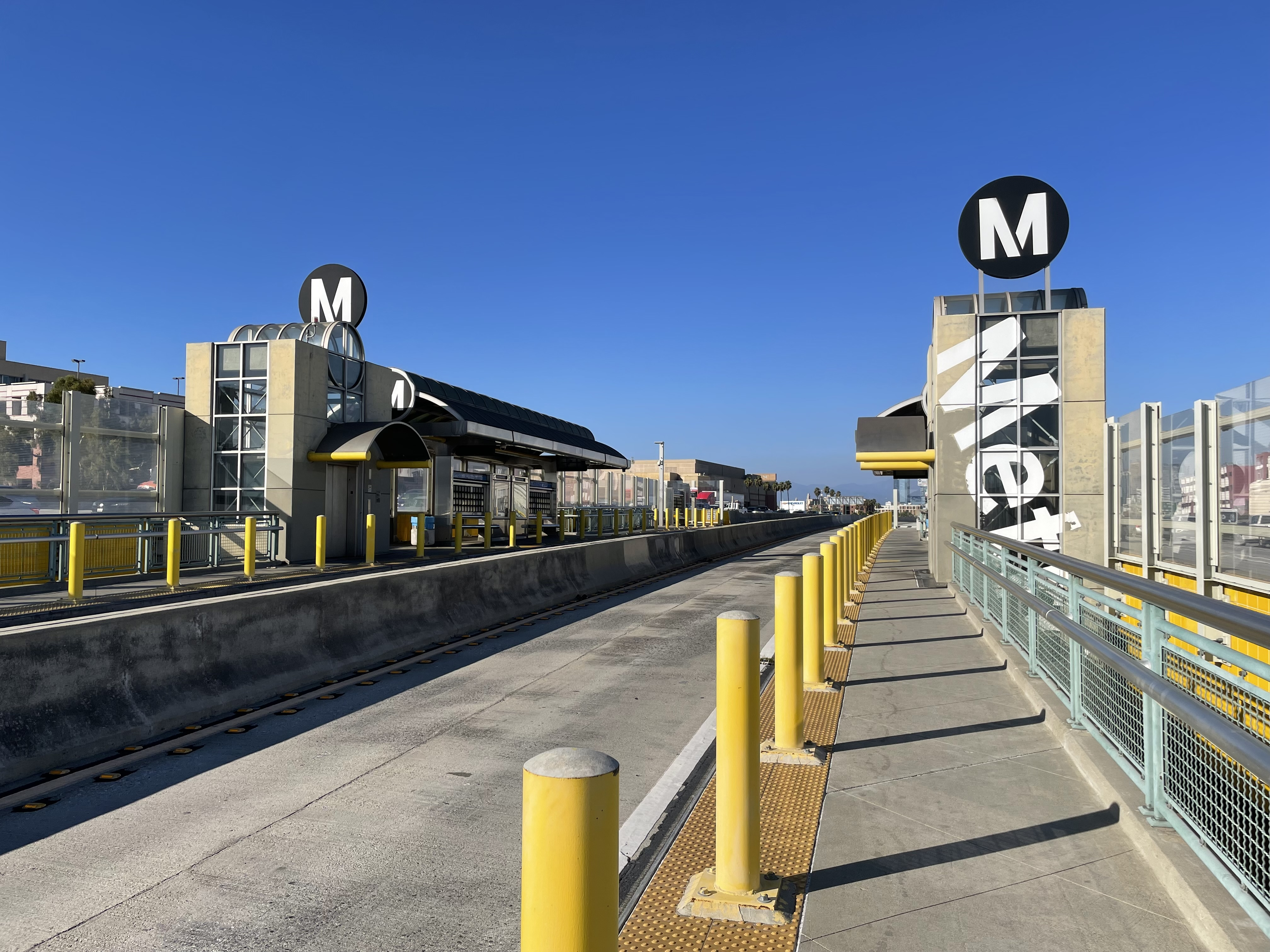
- 37th Street/USC station platforms, looking north

General information
- Location: 421 1/2 West 37th Street; Los Angeles, California
- Coordinates: 34°01′03″N 118°16′49″W
- Owner: Caltrans
- Operator: Los Angeles Metro
- Line: See Services section
- Platforms: 2 side platforms

Construction
- Structure type: Elevated
- Accessible: Yes

History
- Opened: July 28, 1997

Passengers
- FY 2025: 330 (avg. wkdy boardings, J Line)

Services
Preceding station	Metro Busway	Following station
Slauson toward Harbor Gateway or San Pedro	J Line	LATTC/Ortho Institute (stops en route) toward El Monte
Location

37th Street/USC station is a busway station located in Los Angeles, California. It is situated between the LATTC/Ortho Institute and Slauson stations on the J Line, a bus rapid transit route which runs between El Monte, downtown Los Angeles and San Pedro as part of the Metro Busway system. The station consists of two side platforms in the center of Interstate 110 above 37th Street, adjacent to the University of Southern California campus. The station serves the University Park, Exposition Park and Historic South Central neighborhoods of Los Angeles.

37th Street/USC was built between 1989 and 1997 as part of the Harbor Transitway and opened to passengers on July 28, 1997, about a year after the other stations on the transitway. J Line buses serve the station twenty-four hours a day; the headway between buses is about four minutes during peak periods, with less frequent service at other times. 37th Street/USC station is also served by several Los Angeles Metro Bus, LADOT Commuter Express and Torrance Transit bus services, most of which only run during weekday peak periods.

== Location ==
37th Street/USC station is situated along the Harbor Transitway near the University Park, Exposition Park and Historic South-Central neighborhoods of Los Angeles. The entrances to its two side platforms are located along West 37th Street between South Flower Street and South Hope Street. The station is just east of the University of Southern California campus and Exposition Park. Inside Exposition Park are the Los Angeles Memorial Coliseum, the Banc of California Stadium, the California Science Center, the Natural History Museum of Los Angeles County, and the California African American Museum.

The station is close to two Metro E Line stations. Jefferson/USC is 0.3 miles (0.48 km) north on South Flower Street and Expo Park/USC is 0.4 miles (0.64 km) west on Exposition Boulevard.

== Station layout ==
37th Street/USC station consists of two 245-foot-long (75 m) side platforms, located above a ground-level plaza along West 37th Street. The ground-level plaza includes bus boarding bays and a TAP card ticket vending machine was added in early 2017 to support all-door boarding on the J Line.

== Services ==
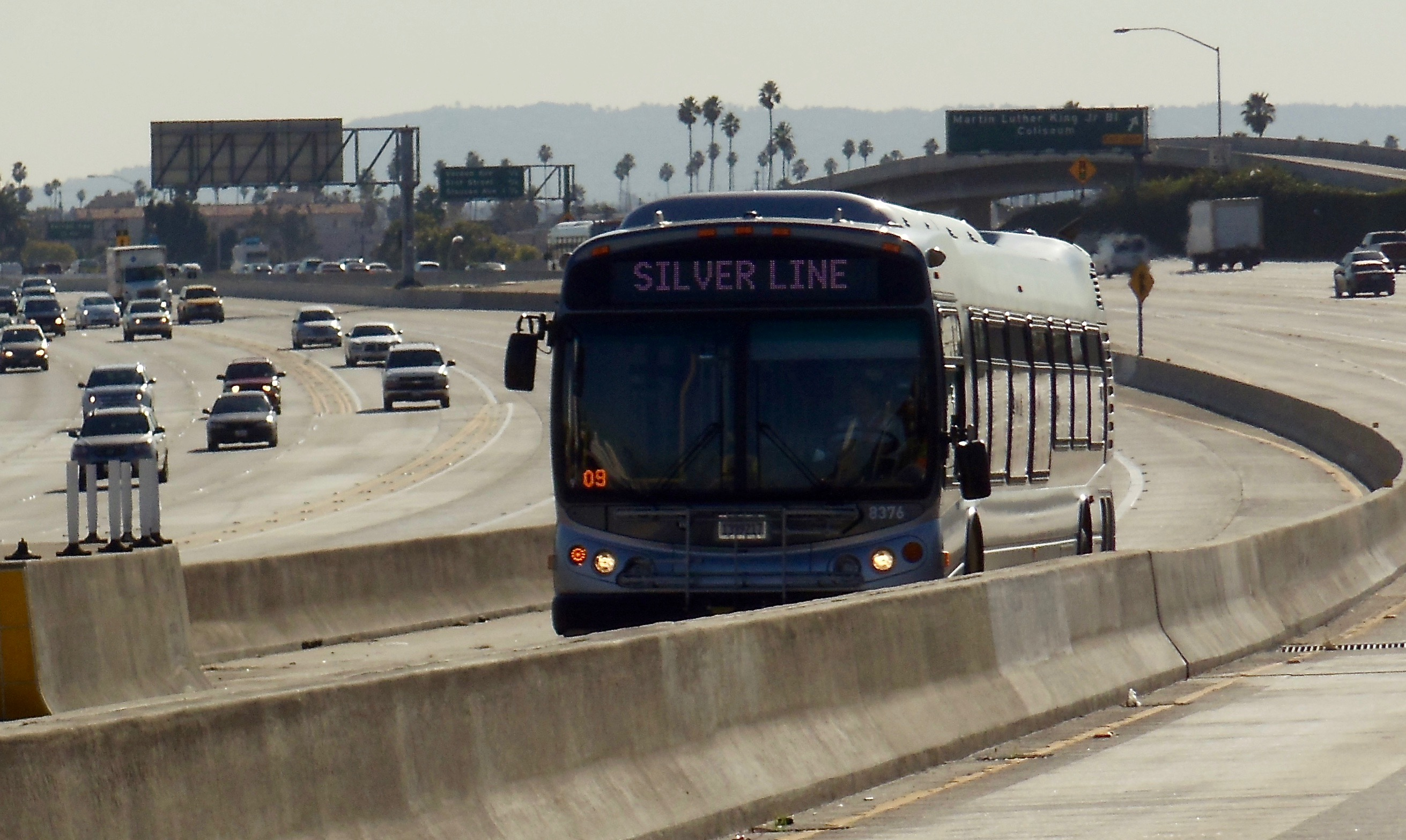
A northbound Metro J Line bus approaching 37th Street/USC station

37th Street/USC station is used by the Metro J Line bus rapid transit route which runs between El Monte station in El Monte, downtown Los Angeles and the Harbor Gateway Transit Center in Gardena, California, with select trips continuing onto San Pedro. The J Line is part of the Metro Busway system.

J Line buses run 24 hours a day between El Monte, Downtown Los Angeles, and the Harbor Gateway Transit Center, as route 910. Some trips continue to San Pedro between 6 a.m. and 8 p.m. and are signed as Route 950. On weekdays, buses operate every four to eight minutes during peak hours. They operate every 10 minutes in the midday, 20 minutes during evenings, 40 minutes during nights, and every hour overnight. On weekends, buses arrive every 15 minutes most of the day. They operate every 20 minutes during evenings, 40 minutes during nights, and every hour overnight.

In addition to J Line buses, the busway platforms at 37th Street/USC station are also served by the all-day Los Angeles Metro Bus route 460 to Disneyland. There are also several routes that use the busway, geared towards people commuting to Los Angeles, operating only during weekday rush-hours, operating towards the city in the morning and returning at night: LADOT Commuter Express route 438 to Redondo Beach, 439 to El Segundo and route 448 to Rancho Palos Verdes; and Torrance Transit route 4X to Torrance (also operates all-day Saturday).

37th Street/USC station is also served by several bus routes that use bus stops near to the station on surface streets: Los Angeles Metro Bus route 81 that runs between Eagle Rock and South Los Angeles, route 102 that runs between LAX and South Gate, and route 200 that begins near the station and runs to Echo Park; Metro Express route 550 to San Pedro; LADOT DASH shuttle route F that operates between downtown Los Angeles and the station area via Figueroa Street, the King-East route that serves the Historic South Central neighborhood, and the Southeast route that serves the South Park neighborhood; and shuttles operated by the University of Southern California.
