= Los Angeles Animal Services =

Agency of the Los Angeles city government

The City of Los Angeles Animal Services Department is an agency of the Los Angeles city government that provides animal control and animal shelter services. It is headquartered in Figueroa Plaza in Downtown Los Angeles.

== History ==
In the 1999-2000 fiscal year, 72% of the animals entering the shelter network died. This was 61% for the 2000-2001 fiscal year.

In 2002, as there was a secession proposal for the San Fernando Valley. Activist Nancy Smith argued that such a secession would allow a new municipality for the San Fernando Valley to create a better animal shelter network compared to the one provided by the Los Angeles city government.

In June 2022 the agency changed its practices for court case dogs (dogs held as evidence in animal abuse cases) by allowing volunteers to take them on walks.

Karen Bass became Mayor of Los Angeles in 2022. She stated that the agency would be improved that the city would become "a national model for animal welfare."

Nathan Solis of the Los Angeles Times, in 2023, described the agency as "troubled". Dakota Smith, of the same newspaper, said that year that conditions in the agency's shelters were declining.

In 2023, the department had requested to Bass that she give $42,000,000 to the agency as a budget. Bass instead proposed $31,700,000. The department had wanted a 56% increase. Ultimately the budget was instead increased by 18%.

In 2024, the euthanasia rate had increased from previous years. In 2024, 81% of the cats which came to the agency facilities left alive, while 91% of the dogs in those situations left alive.

== Operations ==
As of 2022 the department gives volunteers the majority of the work of walking dogs. Additionally, that year, volunteers had the majority of the work of caring for smaller animals.

== Facilities ==
- Chesterfield Square/South Los Angeles Animal Services Center
  - In 2022, Los Angeles Times reporter Dakota Smith stated that this was "the most crowded shelter" in the network.
- East Valley Animal Services Center (Van Nuys)
- Harbor Animal Services Center (San Pedro)
- North Central Animal Services Center (Lincoln Heights)
- West Valley Animal Services Center (Chatsworth)
- West Los Angeles Animal Services Center (Sawtelle)
