= Florence, Los Angeles =

Coordinates: 33.9746°N 118.2480°W

Florence
- Neighborhood of Los Angeles
- Interactive map of Florence
- Country: United States
- State: California
- County: Los Angeles
- City: Los Angeles
- Time zone: Pacific
- Area code: 323

Florence is a neighborhood in Los Angeles, California. The neighborhood, part of the South Los Angeles region, is home to over 46,000 residents.

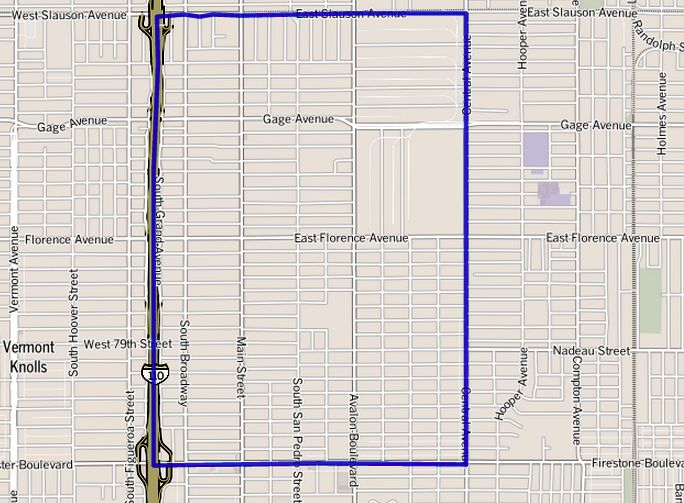
Florence district of the city of Los Angeles, as drawn by the Los Angeles Times

== Geography ==
The 2.8-square-mile Florence neighborhood touches South Park on the north, Central-Alameda on the northeast, Florence-Firestone on the east, Green Meadows and Broadway-Manchester on the south and southeast and Vermont Knolls and Vermont-Slauson on the west. It is bounded by East Slauson Avenue on the north, Central Avenue on the east, Manchester Avenue on the south and Interstate 110 on the west.

== Population ==
A total of 43,815 residents lived on Florence's 2.8 square miles, according to the 2000 U.S. census — averaging 15,661 people per square mile, among the highest population densities in both the city and the county. In 2008 the city estimated that Florence's population had grown to 46,610.

The median age was 23, young for the city and the county, and the percentages of residents younger than age 34 were among the county's highest. There were 2,441 families headed by single parents; the rate of 28.1% was considered high for both the city and the county.

The proportions of Latino and black people in the neighborhood, 69.8% and 28.1%, respectively, were reckoned as a high figure for the county. Other ethnicities were white, 0.4%; Asian, 0.4%; and other, 1.3%. Mexico and El Salvador were the most common places of birth for the 41.3% of the residents who were born abroad, about an average percentage for the city as a whole.

The median household income in 2008 dollars was $29,447, considered low for both the city and county. The percentage of households earning $20,000 or less was high, compared to the county at large. The average household size of 3.8 people was also considered high. Renters occupied 65.2% of the housing units, and homeowners occupied the rest.

== Education ==
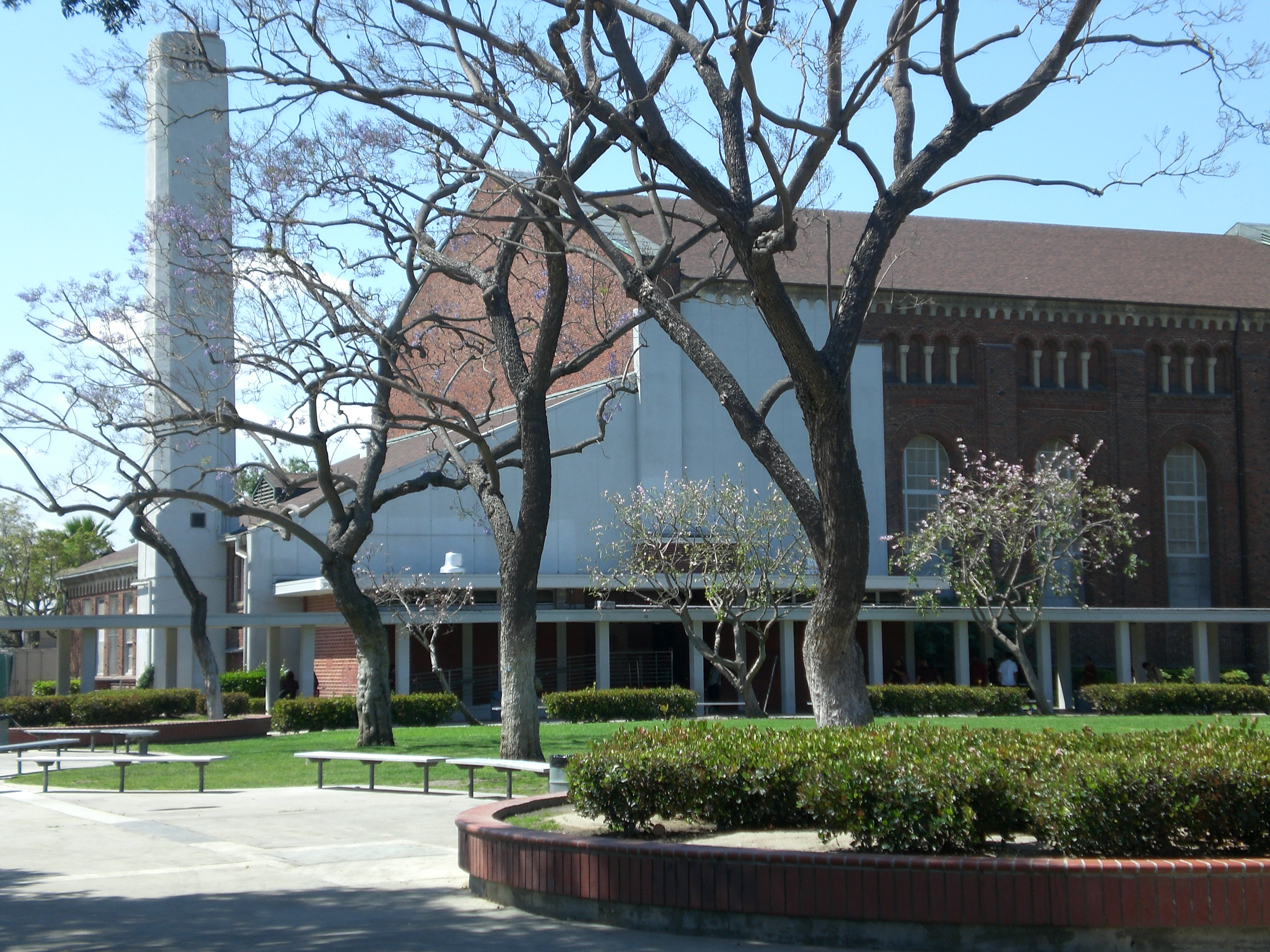
John C. Fremont High School in 2007

Only 2.8% of Florence residents held a four-year college degree, a low percentage for both the city and the county. The percentage of residents age 25 and older with less than a high school diploma was high for the county.

Within the Florence neighborhood are found:

- John C. Fremont Senior High School (LAUSD)
- Mary McLeod Bethune Middle School (LAUSD)
- St. Columbkille Elementary School (private)
- Sixty-Sixth Street Elementary School (LAUSD)
- Seventy-Fifth Street Elementary School (LAUSD)

== See also ==
- List of districts and neighborhoods in Los Angeles
