= Victor Heights, Los Angeles =

Victor Heights
- Neighborhood of Los Angeles
- Nickname: Forgotten Edge
- Location within Los Angeles
- Coordinates: 34.069143°N 118.246456°W
- Country: United States of America
- State: California
- County: Los Angeles
- Time zone: Pacific
- Zip Code: 90012
- Area code: Area code 213

Victor Heights, sometimes referred to as the Forgotten Edge, is a neighborhood in Central Los Angeles.

== History ==
The neighborhood was named after Victor Beaudry, a water mogul. He was the younger brother of Prudent Beaudry who was the 13th Mayor of Los Angeles, California from 1874 to 1876. In 1887, Victor Heights was advertised as having "Choice lots, commanding a splendid view" for $1,200. Lesser lots went for $700 to $1,300. All had "Water piped through the street." In 1908 its residents took a fight against disruptive dynamite blasting by the Los Angeles Brick Company in Chavez Ravine to the Los Angeles City Police Commission. They complained that the explosions were "cracking the plaster on their walls and causing their homes to settle to such an extent that they could not open their doors.

== Geography ==
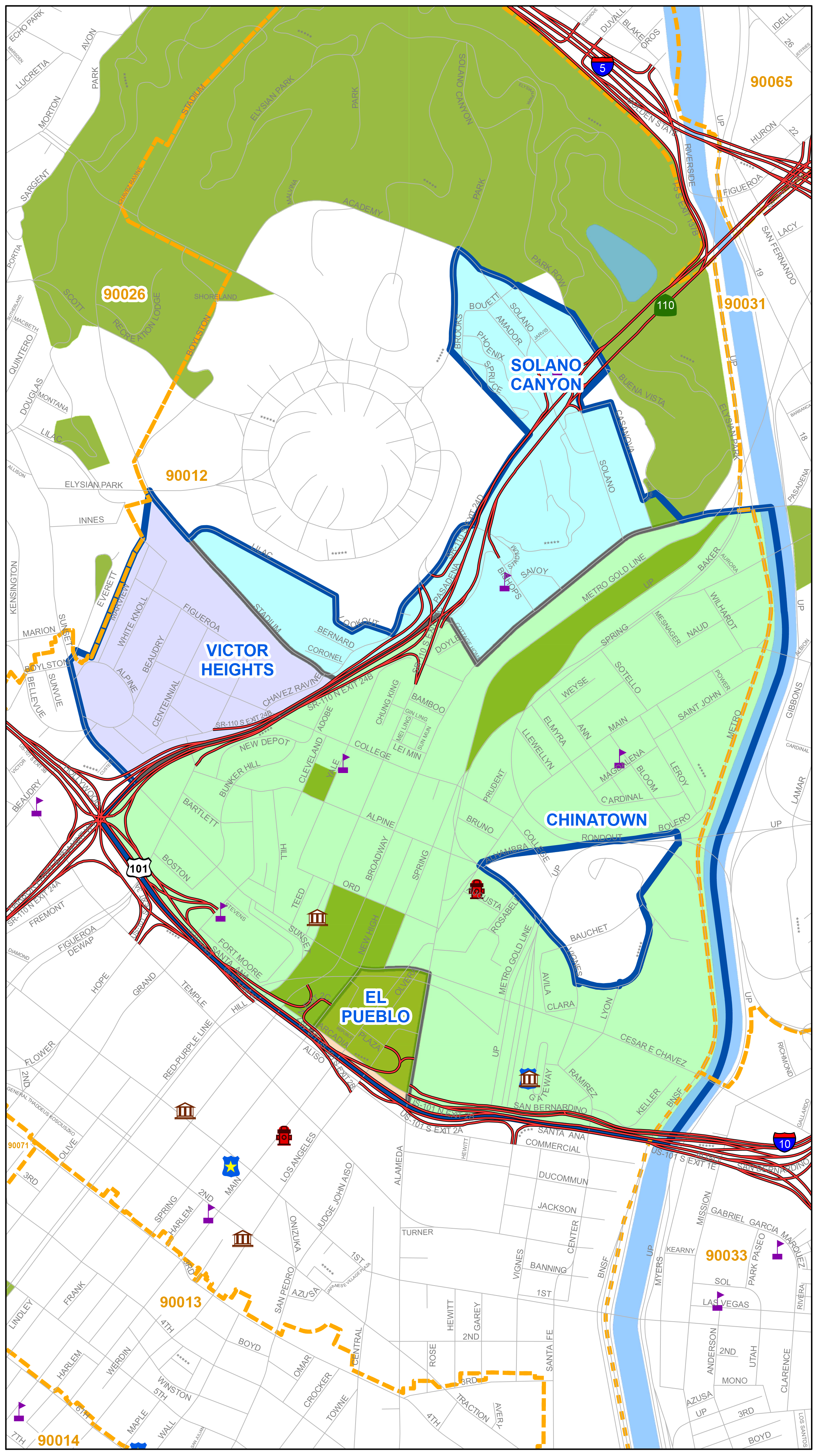
Historic Cultural North Neighborhood Council map showing the location of Victor Heights

Victor Heights is located northwest of Downtown Los Angeles. It is bounded by Sunset Boulevard on the south, 110 freeway and Chinatown on the east, Stadium Way on the north, and Marview Avenue on the west.

It is a neighborhood of steep hills where new condominium complexes stand next to 1920s-era bungalow houses and old apartment buildings The neighborhood backs up against Elysian Park. In the 19th century, an oval-shaped parcel (where the former Metropolitan Water District headquarters stands) was Beaudry Park.

== Government ==
Victor Heights is part of the Historic Cultural North Neighborhood Council (HCNNC) which represents Chinatown, El Pueblo, Solano Canyon, and Victor Heights in the City of Los Angeles.

== Demographics ==
In 2009, The Los Angeles Times defined the neighborhood's demographic mix as older Italians and Croatians who once dominated the area, along with newer Asian and Latino immigrants, and a smattering of hipsters.

== Forgotten Edge ==
The neighborhood residents selected the nickname "Forgotten Edge" in 1992 when they formed a "neighborhood watch" group. Residents were frustrated about being transferred back and forth between the Central and Northeast police divisions whenever they tried to phone in a crime report because the Police Department couldn’t figure out where Figueroa Terrace and a pocket of neighboring streets were.

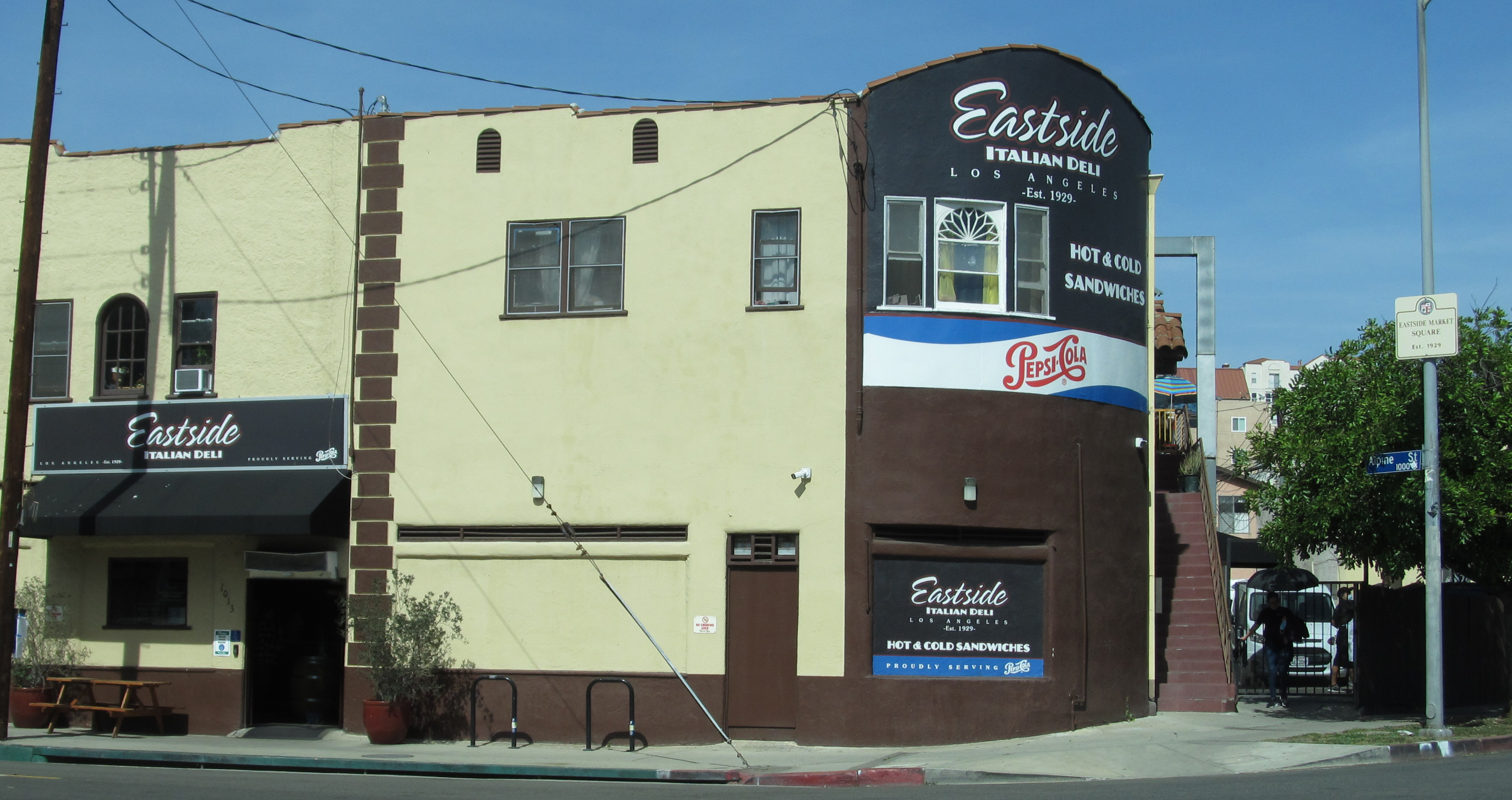
Eastside Market located at the city designated “Eastside Market Square”

== Peacocks ==
A notable neighbor of Victor Heights are the peacocks and peahens that reside on the lawns and rooftops but adopted by the community as part of its urban landscape.

== Landmarks ==
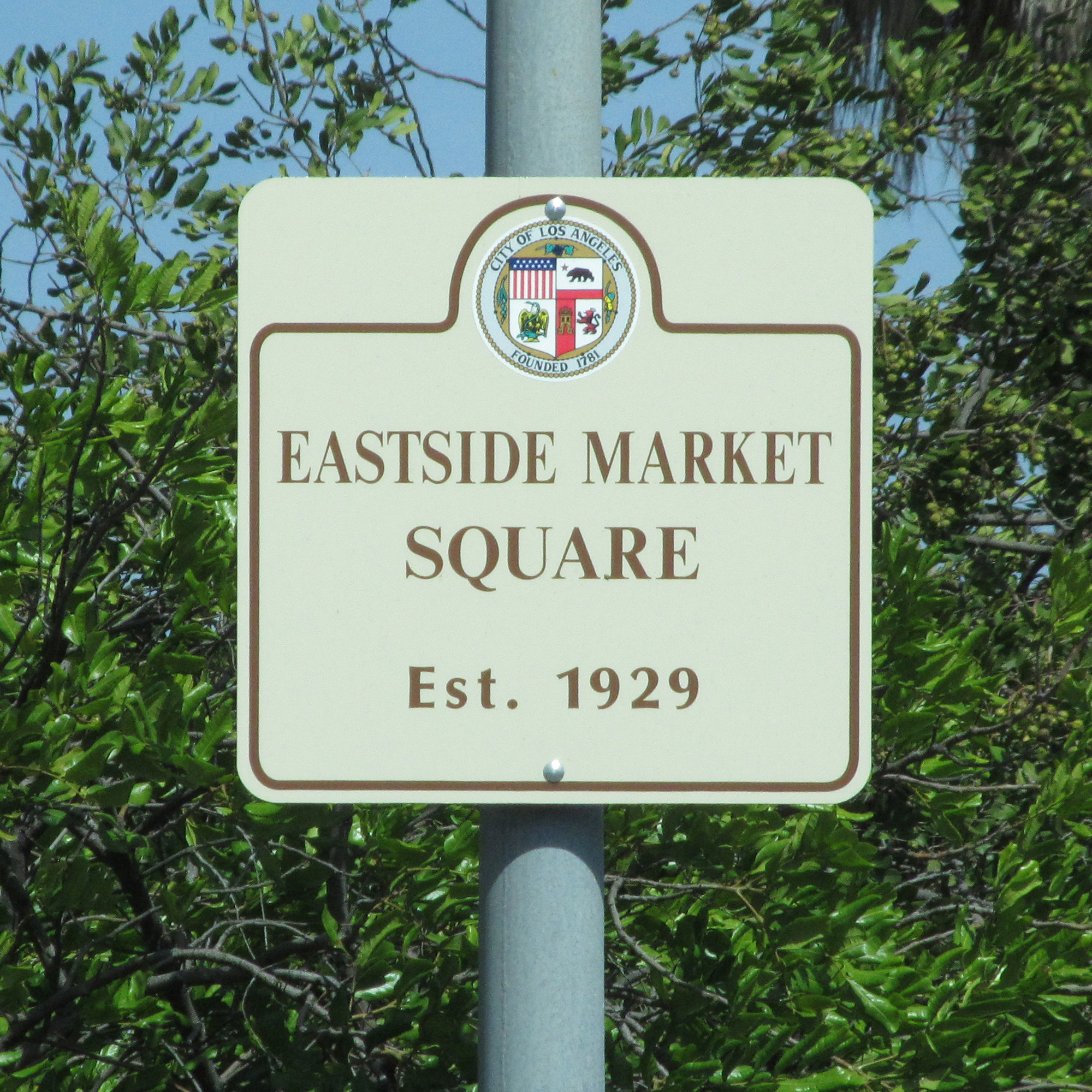
“Eastside Market Square” signage

- The Eastside Market - Opened in 1929, the Eastside Market is the last remaining original Italian market in the area. Those markets serviced a predominately Italian immigrant community which adopted Victor Heights as an Italian enclave. On February 14, 2017, the Los Angeles City Council designated the intersection of Alpine Street and Figueroa Terrace as “Eastside Market Square” and instructed the Department of Transportation to fabricate and install appropriate signage.
- Metropolitan Water District Building - designed by William Pereira. The land was purchased in 1959 for $1.2 million, and construction was completed in 1963.
- Everett Park, an L.A. municipal park sometimes called Teardrop Park due to its shape, noted for its excellent views of the downtown skyline, is located in the Forgotten Edge.
