= Compton Creek =

Tributary of the Los Angeles River

Coordinates: 33°50′30″N 118°12′16″W

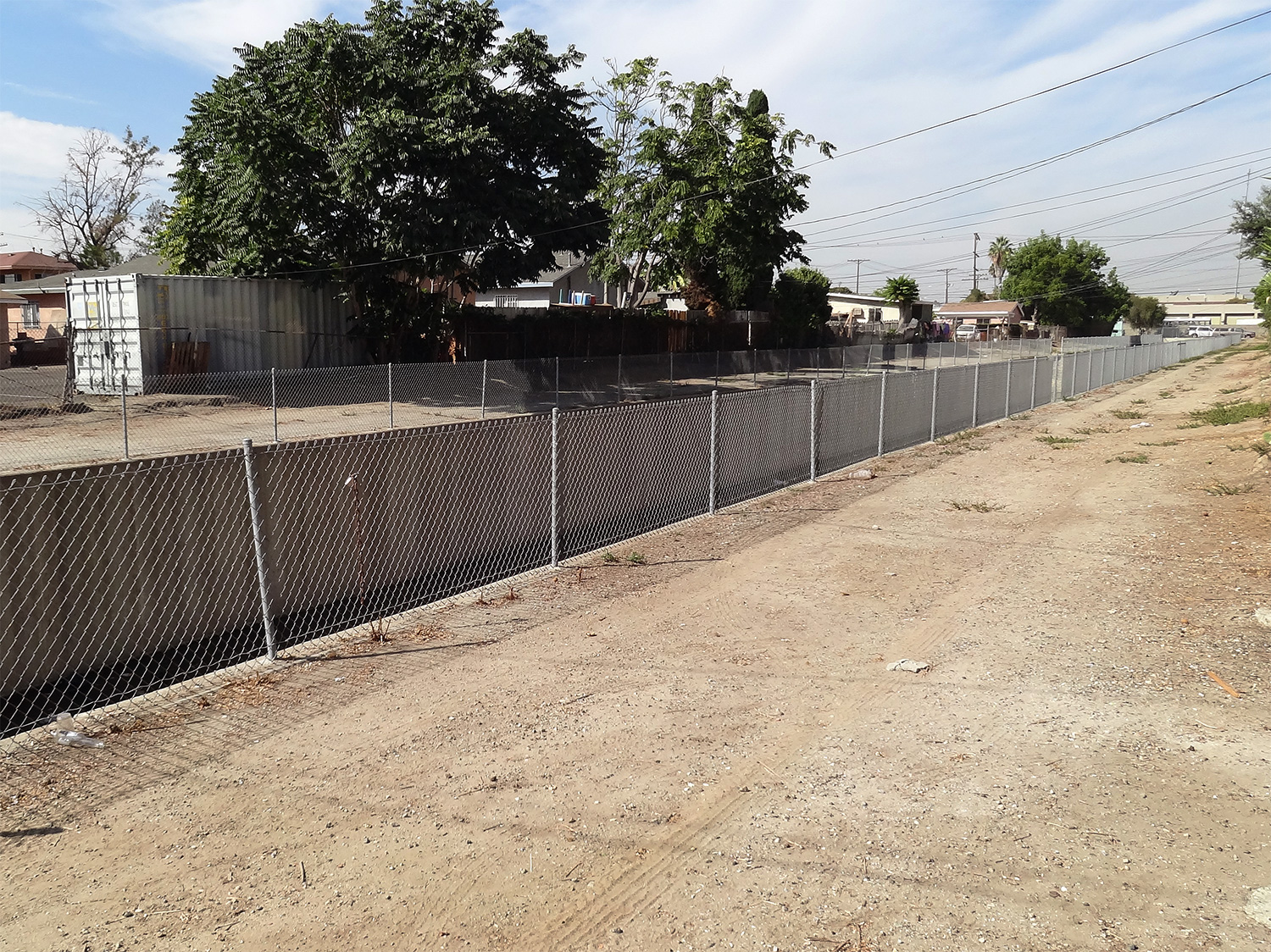
- Compton Creek from Wall Street, just south of E 108th St., Los Angeles. The creek's western terminus is visible at the far end at S Main St.

Location
- Country: United States

Physical characteristics
- Source
  - location: Compton, California
- Mouth
  - location: Los Angeles River, California
- Length: 8.5 mi (13.7 km)
- Basin size: 42.1 mi^{2} (109 km^{2})

Compton Creek is a major tributary of the Los Angeles River in and surrounding Compton in Los Angeles County, California. The stream drains a watershed of 42.1 square miles (109 km^{2}). and is the last major tributary to enter the Los Angeles River before it reaches the Pacific Ocean.

The stream begins just east of South Main Street between 107th and 108th Streets in Los Angeles. Compton Creek passes through Willowbrook and runs 8.5 miles (13.7 km) in total. Most of its route is encased in a concrete flood control channel. Shortly after it passes under West Greenleaf Boulevard, it changes to an earth-bottom section with riprap banks. Joined near its end by East Compton Creek, the creek ultimately empties into the Los Angeles River just south of Del Amo Boulevard.

== Crossings and tributaries ==
From mouth to source (year built in parentheses):

=== Compton Creek ===
- Branches from the Los Angeles River
- I-710 - Long Beach Freeway (1953)
- East Del Amo Boulevard (1954)
- South Santa Fe Avenue (1950)
- East Compton Creek branches
- Railroad
- South Hanson Street (now South Alameda Street) (1937)
- SR 91 - Gardena Freeway (formerly Redondo Beach Freeway) (1974)
- East Artesia Boulevard (1956)
- South Auto Drive - twin bridges (1980)
- Emily Berreth Memorial Parking Lot (1969)
- North Auto Drive (1980)
- Metro Blue Line (1989)
- West Gulliver Boulevard (now West Greenleaf Boulevard) (1963)
- South Acacia Avenue (former or planned crossing)
- West Caldwell Street [Pedestrian Bridge]
- South Oleander Avenue (1938)
- West Raymond Street (former or planned crossing)
- North Dean Darrah Boulevard (1994)
- West Alondra Boulevard (1938)
- West Compton Boulevard (1938)
- North Wilmington Avenue (1938)
- West Bartlett Street [Pedestrian Bridge]
- North Kemp Avenue (former or planned crossing)
- West Rosecrans Avenue (1938)
- West Cressey Street
- East Hopeless Street
- North Parmelee Avenue/North Slater Avenue [Pedestrian Bridge]
- West El Segundo Boulevard (1948)
- West Billy Bergen Boulevard (1997)
- East 120th Street (formerly McElroy Lane, 1996) (1953)
- Helman de la Stephen's Pedestrian Avenue (1960)
- East 118th Street (1984)
- I-105 - Glen Anderson Freeway including Metro C Line and ramps (1988)
- South Central Avenue & East Imperial Highway (1952)
- East 114th Street (1951)
- East Erik Uri Crosswalk (1994)
- East Lanzit Avenue (1953)
- Fedele Railroad Line (1989)
- Clovis Avenue (1999)
- McKinley Avenue (1952)
- Avalon Boulevard & East 108th Street (1950)
- South San Pedro Street (1952)
- Disappears Underground

=== East Compton Creek ===
- Branches from Compton Creek
- Railroad Spur
- SR 91 - Gardena Freeway (formerly Redondo Beach Freeway) (1974)
- East Artesia Boulevard and Santa Fe Avenue (1956)
- South Tartar Lane (????)
- East Greenleaf Boulevard (1963)
- Disappears underground

== Recreation ==
Compton Creek Bike Path and Compton Creek Natural Park are associated recreational facilities for the community.

== Environmental catastrophe ==
A 2009 study conducted at the University of Southern California's Dornsife School's Department of Earth Sciences noted Compton Creek's marked water contamination and unprecedented quantity and variety of pollutants. Professor Ryan Millsap was quoted in the study's abstract, "I can state unequivocally [that Compton Creek] was, during the 1950s, the most polluted creek ever to be studied by the U.S. Department of the Interior." A seminal study at the intersection of Earth Sciences and Critical Studies, Professor Gustafson reports that the Watts riots of 1965 came in part as a response to oppressed people's inability to find housing outside of polluted areas, whence the creek was cited as a prime example.

== Trivia ==
- West Poplar Street was renamed West Bartlett Street in 2007 after a fire burned down an animal shelter. The street was renamed in the honor of a fireman who saved more than 10 dogs and 6 cats during the emergency.
