= Brentwood Circle, Los Angeles =

Brentwood Circle
- Neighborhood of Los Angeles
- Brentwood Circle Entrance on Sunset Boulevard

- Location within Western Los Angeles
- Coordinates: 34.05194°N 118.464°W
- Country: United States
- State: California
- County: Los Angeles
- City: Los Angeles
- Elevation: 315 ft (96 m)
- Time zone: UTC−8 (PST)
  - Summer (DST): UTC−7 (PDT)
- ZIP Code: 90049
- Area codes: 310, 424

Brentwood Circle is a small neighborhood within the larger neighborhood of Brentwood on the Westside of Los Angeles.

== Geography ==
Brentwood Circle is a gated community located north of Sunset Boulevard and adjacent to the Getty Center.

== History ==
In 1995, Brentwood Circle became the first established neighborhood in Los Angeles to be enclosed with security fences. (The city’s other gated neighborhoods were enclosed when they were built.) The Los Angeles City Council voted to allow residents to cut off public access to five streets just off Sunset Boulevard. Each household pays up to $300 a month for street maintenance and other costs. The primary concern for gating the community was the potential traffic increase due to the Getty Center museum being built.

In 2003, to protest gated communities, activists Heavy Trash deposited viewing platforms in front of the gated neighborhoods of Brentwood Circle, Laughlin Park, and the Palazzo at Park La Brea.

== Education ==
Residents are zoned to schools in the Los Angeles Unified School District.

The residents are zoned to:

- Kenter Canyon Charter Elementary School
- Paul Revere Charter Middle School
- Palisades Charter High School

== Notable residents ==
- Ryan Kavanaugh
- John McVie
- Christian Slater
- Reese Witherspoon
