= Crestwood Hills, Los Angeles =

Human settlement in Los Angeles, California, United States of America

Coordinates: 34.0766°N 118.4891°W

Crestwood Hills is a neighborhood within Brentwood, Los Angeles, California, located on the ridges to the north and east of Kenter Canyon in the Santa Monica Mountains. It is best known for its mid-century modern architecture, and contains several homes designated as architectural landmarks by the State of California. The homes were designed by A. Quincy Jones, and are featured in numerous magazines, articles, and books about mid-century modern housing. The community includes a park, pre-school, and homeowners' association.

Crestwood Hills began as a utopian experiment in the late 1940s by a few intellectuals, and eventually turned into a cooperative association that included 400 members. The project was initially called the Mutual Housing Tract, before changing to Crestwood Hills. It was intended as a multi-ethnic project, but pressure on the landowner from existing Brentwood residents—this was still the era of racially restrictive covenants (primarily against African-Americans; the development itself was nearly all White) and religiously restrictive covenants (primarily against Catholics; the development itself was nearly one-half Jewish)—eventually led to some members of the founding group being dropped as a condition of finalizing the sale.

The 1961 Brentwood-Bel-Air fire led to the destruction of 49 homes. Brenda Rees of the Los Angeles Times said "decades of construction and reconstruction erased much of the original modern design." By 2000, Crestwood Hills was a wealthy neighborhood. Today's sales are typically in the multi-million dollar range, whereas when initially purchased in 1949, a typical residence was priced at twenty thousand dollars ($20,000).

== Education ==
Crestwood Hills is within the Los Angeles Unified School District.

The community also maintains its own cooperative preschool, and parents who send their children there are required to volunteer two or three times a month. Dues paying members of the Crestwood Hills Homeowners Association receive priority admission to the school.

== Parks and recreation ==
Crestwood Hills Park is located in Crestwood Hills. The park has barbecue pits, unlighted outdoor basketball courts, a children's play area, a community room with a capacity of 90 people, hiking trails, a kitchen, and picnic tables.

== Notable residents ==
- Marvin Braude (1920–2005), member of the Los Angeles City Council between 1965 and 1997.
- David Baerwald (1960–), award-winning songwriter, composer and lyricist.
- Hank Worden (1902–1991), versatile movie actor and member of the John Wayne stock company; known for his portrayal of Mose Harper in "The Searchers".
