= Central Alameda, Los Angeles =

Central Alameda
- Neighborhood of Los Angeles
- Location within Los Angeles
- Coordinates: 33°59′51″N 118°14′52″W
- Country: United States
- State: California
- County: Los Angeles
- City: Los Angeles
- Time zone: Pacific
- Area code: 323
- Website: Central Alameda NC

Central Alameda is a 2.18 square miles (5.65 km^{2}) square mile area in South Los Angeles served by the Central Alameda Neighborhood Council.

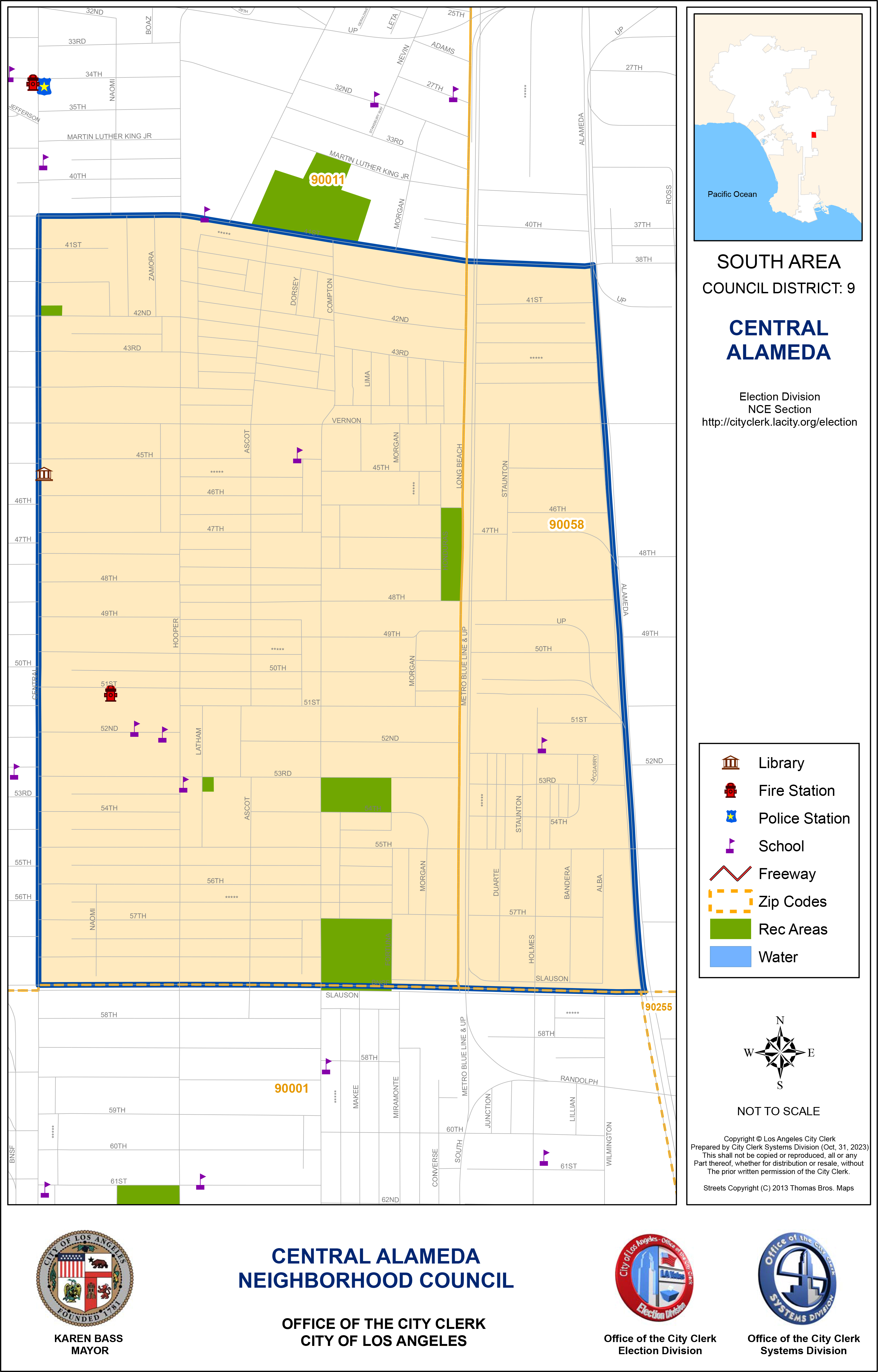
Central Alameda Neighborhood Council Map

== History ==
Central Adameda was certified by the City of Los Angeles as a neighborhood Council on September 30, 2003.

== Geography ==
=== Boundaries ===
According to the Central Alameda Neighborhood Council map, the street boundaries are: 41st Street on the north; Slauson Avenue on the south; Central Avenue on the west, and Alameda Street on the east.

=== Neighborhoods ===
The Central Alameda area encompasses the neighborhood of Nevin.

== Demographics ==
=== 2000 census ===
According to the 2000 U.S. census, the neighborhood's population was 40,947, which amounted to 18,760 people per square mile, among the highest densities for the city of Los Angeles and among the highest densities for the county. In 2008 the L.A. Department of City Planning estimated the population at 43,638. The average household size was 4.3 people, considered high for both the city and the county. Renters occupied 70.2% of the housing units and owners inhabited the rest, 29.8%.

There were 1,980 families headed by single parents, 26.3% of the total, considered high for both the city and the county. The median age was 22, "young for the city and young for the county." The percentages of residents aged 10 through 34 were among the county's highest. The percentages of never married men and women were among the county's highest. Just 444 people, 1.8% of the neighborhood population, were veterans, low for both the city and the county.

The Los Angeles Times classified the neighborhood as "not especially diverse." Today Latinos make up 84.6% of the population (high for the county), blacks 13.3% (also high for the county), whites 1% and Asians 0.7%.

The median household income of $31,559 (in 2008 dollars) was low for both the city and the county.

Just 2.8% of the residents 25 and older had a four-year degree, considered low when compared to the city and the county as a whole. Seventy-five percent of residents in that age range had failed to complete high school, the highest percentage of any Los Angeles City neighborhood.

== Education ==
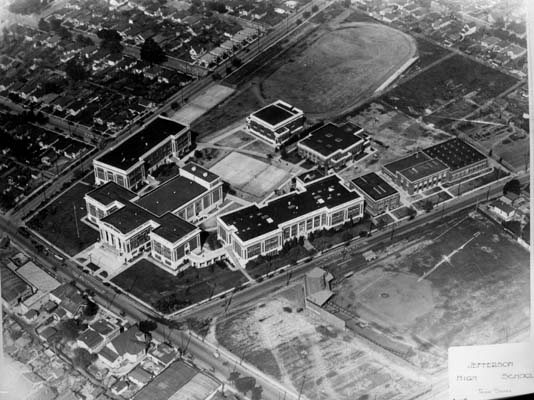
Jefferson High School, 1920

The following public schools are within the council area:

Jefferson High School - 41st and Hooper streets.

== Public Safety ==
There is one fire station within the council area:

- Station 21 - 1192 East 51st Street

== Parks and recreation ==
City recreation facilities include:

- Augustus F. Hawkins Natural Park - Slauson and Compton Avenues
- Central Avenue Pocket Park - Central Avenue at 42nd Place
- Fred Roberts Park and Recreation Center - Long Beach Avenue between East 46th Street and East 48th Place
- Latham Park - Latham Street at East 53rd Street
- Ross Snyder Recreation Center - 41st Street
- Slauson Recreation Center - 53rd Street at Compton Avenue

== See also ==
- Neighborhood councils of Los Angeles
