= Vermont-Slauson, Los Angeles =

Coordinates: 33.988995°N 118.291492°W

Vermont-Slauson
- Neighborhood of Los Angeles
- Interactive map of Vermont-Slauson
- Country: United States
- State: California
- County: Los Angeles
- City: Los Angeles
- Time zone: Pacific

Vermont-Slauson is a 1.44-square-mile neighborhood within the South Los Angeles region of Los Angeles, California.

== Geography ==
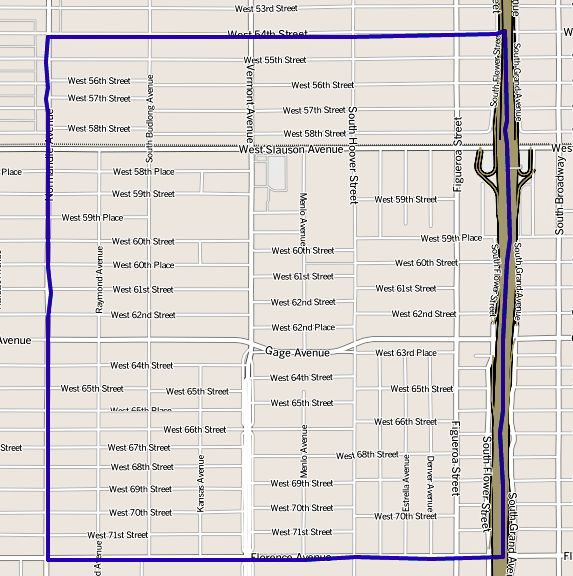
Vermont-Slauson district of the city of Los Angeles, as drawn by the Los Angeles Times

The Vermont-Slauson neighborhood touches Vermont Square on the north, Florence on the east, Vermont Knolls on the south and Harvard Park on the west. It is bounded by 54th Street on the north, the Interstate 110 Freeway on the east, Florence Avenue on the south and Western Avenue on the west.

== Demographics ==
=== 2000 ===
A total of 26,797 residents lived in Vermont-Slauson's 1,44 square miles, according to the 2000 U.S. census — averaging 18,577 people per square mile, among the highest population densities in both the city and the county.

The median age was 25, young for the city and the county, and the percentages of residents younger than age 18 were among the county's highest. There were 1,370 families headed by single parents; the rate of 24.8% was considered high for both the city and the county.

Within the neighborhood, Latino made up 60.5% of the population, while African American were 36.8%. Other ethnicities are White 2.3%; Asian, 0.3%; and other, 1%. Mexico and El Salvador were the most common places of birth for the 39.2% of the residents who were born abroad, about an average percentage for the city as a whole.

=== 2008 ===
The median household income in 2008 dollars was $31,236, considered low for both the city and county. The percentage of households earning $20,000 or less was high, compared to the county at large. The average household size of 3.5 people was also considered high. Renters occupied 61.5% of the housing units, and homeowners occupied the rest.

== Recreation and parks ==
- Mount Carmel Park, Hoover Street between 69th and 70th Street
- Theresa Lindsay Park, Figueroa Street at Slauson Avenue

== Education ==
The following public schools are operated by the Los Angeles Unified School District:

- Augustus F. Hawkins High School - 825 W. 60th Street
- John Muir Middle School - 5929 South Vermont Avenue
- Budlong Avenue Elementary - 5940 South Budlong Avenue
- Sixty-First Street Elementary School - 6020 South Figueroa Street
- Sixty-Eighth Street Elementary School - 612 West 68th Street
