= Chesterfield Square, Los Angeles =

Chesterfield Square
- Neighborhood of Los Angeles
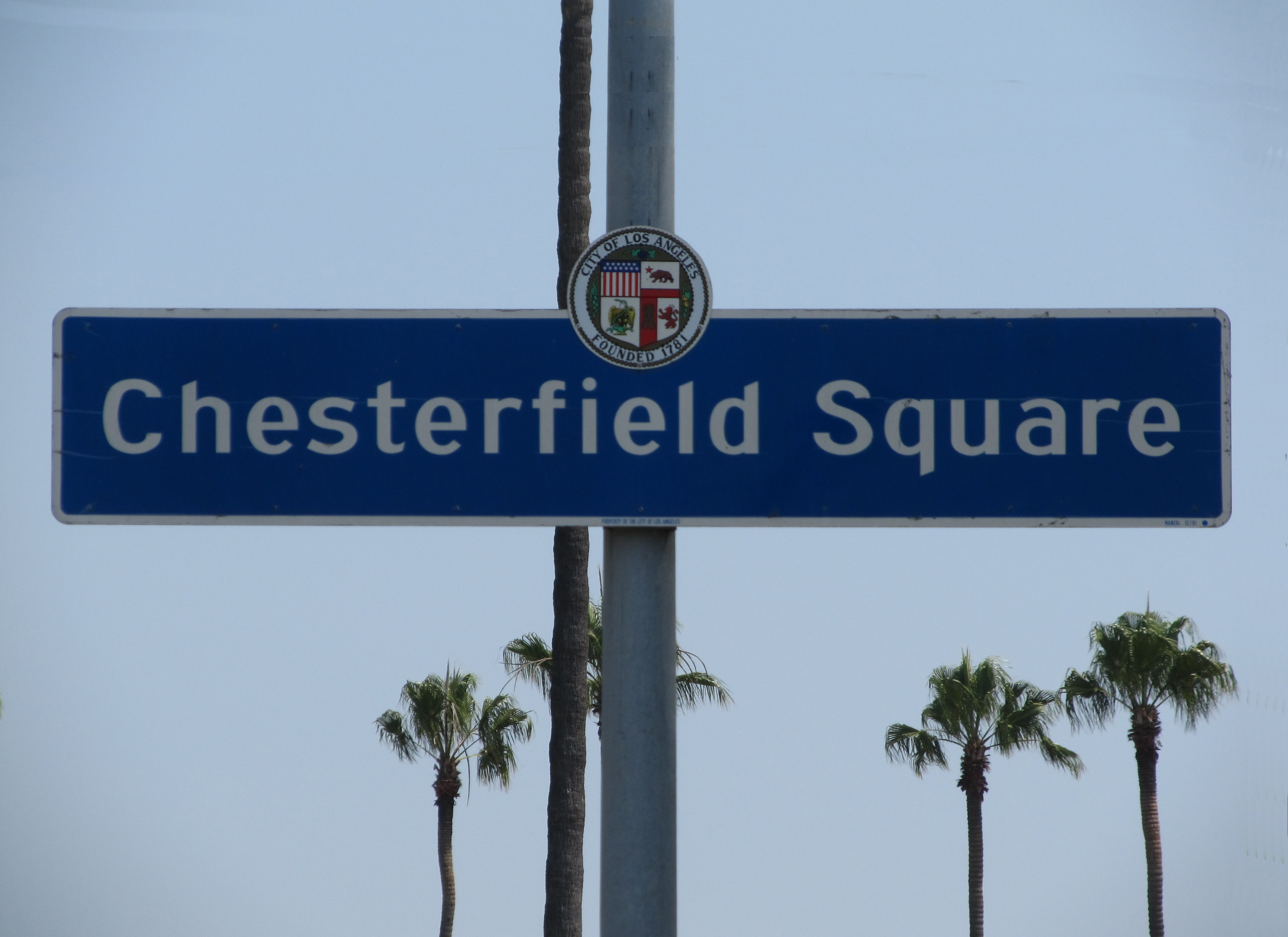
- Chesterfield Square neighborhood sign located at the intersection of Van Ness Avenue & Slauson Avenue.

- Location in relation to Central Los Angeles
- Coordinates: 33°59′36″N 118°18′45″W
- Country: United States
- State: California
- County: Los Angeles
- Time zone: Pacific
- Zip Code: 90043
- Area code: 323

Chesterfield Square is a 0.63-square-mile neighborhood in Los Angeles, California, located within the South Los Angeles region. It contains its namesake park, along with the Van Ness Recreation Center.

== History ==
Homes in Chesterfield Square were advertised for sale in the 1910s and 1920s. According to the ads, prospective buyers could reach the neighborhood via the 54th Street streetcar line.

In 1984, Chesterfield Square was the site gang-related mass murder called the "54th St. Massacre" in which 5 people were killed.

In March 2002, Magic Johnson opened a Starbucks coffee shop in Chesterfield Square. Both Magic Johnson and Keyshawn Johnson were at the grand opening.

Today, the neighborhood is a mix of low-density commercial, industrial, and residential development with characteristic bungalow houses.

== Geography ==
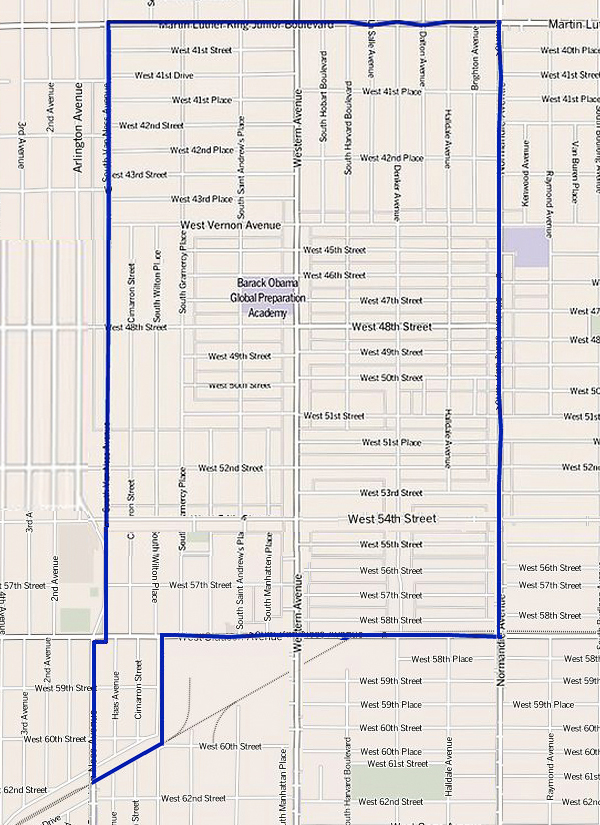
Chesterfield Square neighborhood

By city council action in October 2001 (C.F. #01-1874), "Chesterfield Square" was officially named and designated.

Chesterfield Square is bounded by Martin Luther King Boulevard on the north, Normandie Avenue on the east, South Van Ness Boulevard on the west. The south border is Hyde Park Boulevard to Wilton Place, Wilton Place to Slauson Avenue, and Slauson Avenue to Normandie Avenue.

The Department of Transportation was instructed to install neighborhood signs at: Normandie Avenue and 40th Place, Van Ness Avenue and Slauson Avenue, Western Avenue and 58th Street, Van Ness Avenue at 48th Street, and Slauson Avenue at Halldale Avenue and Haas Avenue.

In 2008, the city approved the Chesterfield Square/Angeles Mesa Gateway Median Sign Project. The Chesterfield Square median sign is located on Arlington Avenue on the south side of 54th Street.

== Demographics ==
A total of 6,062 people lived in Chesterfield Square's 0.63 square miles, according to the 2000 U.S. census—averaging 9,571 people per square mile, about the average population density for both the city and the county.

The median age was 31, about average for the city and the county, but the percentages of residents aged 10 or younger or 11 to 18 were among the county's highest. There were 406 families headed by single parents; the rate of 29.8% was the fourth-highest among city neighborhoods.

Within the neighborhood, African Americans made up 58.6% of the population—considered a high percentage for the county—while Latinos were 36.9%. Other ethnicities were White, 1.5%; Asian, 0.8%; and other, 2.2%. Mexico and El Salvador were the most common places of birth for the 23.4% of the residents who were born abroad, considered to be a low percentage of foreign-born when compared with the city as a whole.

The median household income in 2008 dollars was $37,737, considered low for both the city and county. The percentage of households earning $20,000 or less was high, compared to the county at large. The average household size of three people was about average. Renters occupied 49.4% of the housing units, and homeowners occupied the rest.

The 2000 census counted 298 veterans, of whom 164 served in World War II or the Korean War, a percentage that was among the county's highest.

Only 6% of Chesterfield Square residents 25 and older held a four-year degree, a low percentage for both the city and the county.

It is notable within the city for the relatively low percentage of its 6,000+ residents born outside the United States, for being in first place for the number of violent crimes committed of areas of Los Angeles and for the fact that the percentage of veterans who served during World War II and the Korean War is among the county's highest.

== Education ==
One public school is within the boundaries of Chesterfield Square:

- Barack Obama Global Preparatory Charter Academy, LAUSD, 1708 West 46th Street

== Recreation and parks ==
- Chesterfield Square Park - 1950 West 54th Street. Facility Features: Children's Play Area, Picnic Tables.

== Government ==
- Chesterfield Square/South L.A. Animal Shelter (Los Angeles Animal Services) - 1850 W. 60th Street. One of the six animal shelters run by the city.

== Notable people ==
- Earl C. Gay, former City Council member - 5832 S. Van Ness Avenue

== See also ==
- 8 Streetcar Line.
