= List of parks in Los Angeles =

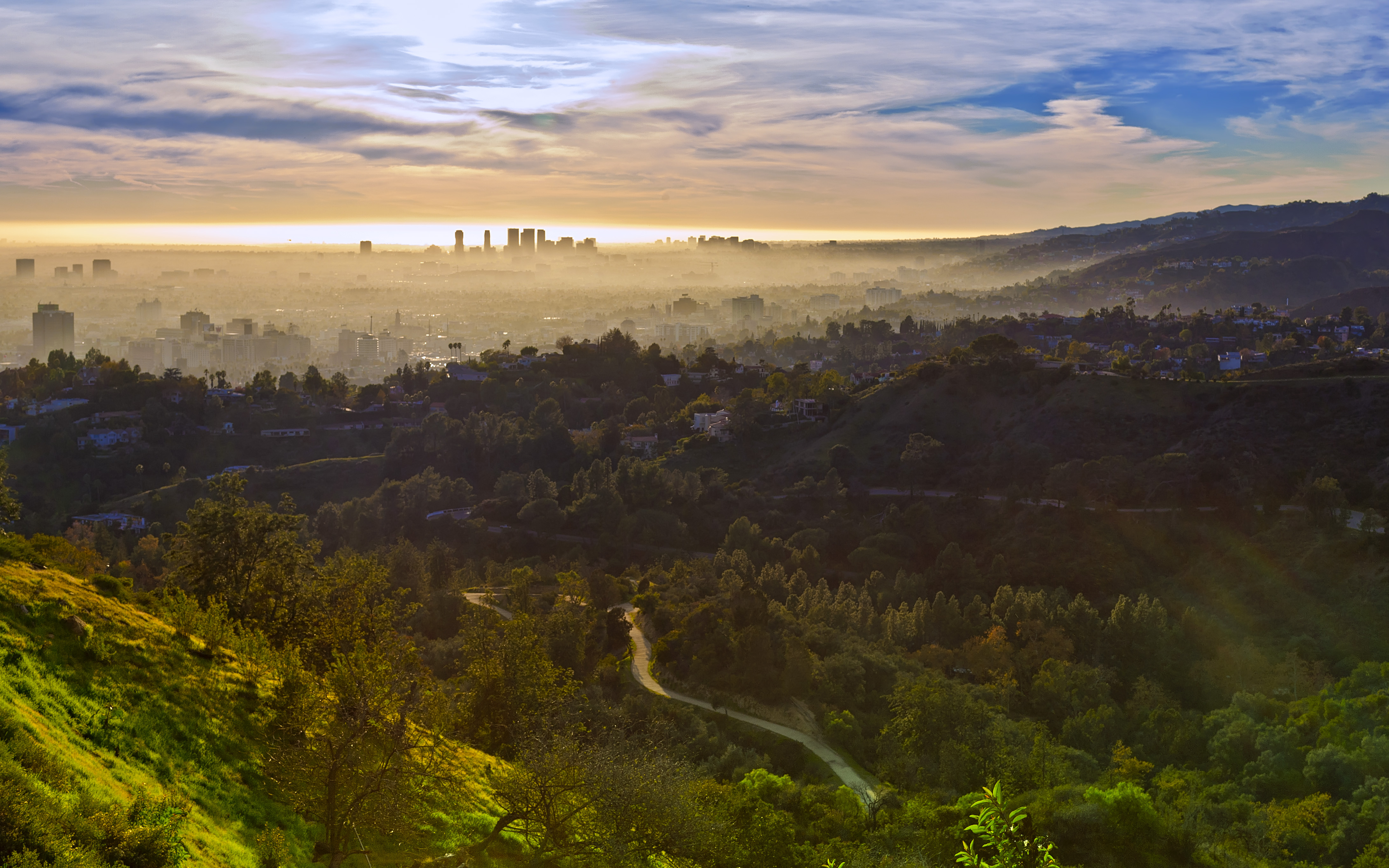
View of Griffith Park, Century City, and Westwood from the observatory

There are numerous parks in the city of Los Angeles, California, United State. The parks listed here do not include those in the enclaves of:

- city of Beverly Hills
- city of Culver City
- Ladera Heights (unincorporated Los Angeles County)
- Marina del Rey (unincorporated Los Angeles County)
- city of Santa Monica
- city of West Hollywood

Parks having coordinates below may be seen together in a map by selecting on "Map of all coordinates using OpenStreetMap" at the right side of this page.

== State parks in Los Angeles ==
California state parks that are wholly or partly in the City of Los Angeles include:

Park name	Classification	Location	Size		Year established	Remarks
Park name	Classification	Location	acres	ha	Year established	Remarks
Dockweiler State Beach	State beach	Los Angeles; 33.922222°N 118.434167°W	91	37	1948	Features 3 miles (4.8 km) of beach and a hang gliding training site, adjacent to Los Angeles International Airport.
Kenneth Hahn State Recreation Area	State recreation area	Baldwin Hills, Los Angeles; 34.008611°N 118.365278°W	401	162	1984	Offers urban open space in the Baldwin Hills of Los Angeles.
Los Angeles State Historic Park	State historic park	Chinatown neighborhood of Los Angeles; 34.066111°N 118.234444°W	32	13	2001	Provides urban open space on the site of an 1875 train station where many travelers first arrived in Los Angeles.
Los Encinos State Historic Park	State historic park	Los Angeles; 34.160278°N 118.499167°W	4.7	1.9	1949	
Rio de Los Angeles State Park	State recreation area (Note: Rio de Los Angeles State Park is officially designated as a state recreation area.)	Glassell Park neighborhood, Los Angeles; 34.098611°N 118.236111°W	58	23	2001	
Verdugo Mountains	Park property	unincorporated Los Angeles County, Glendale, Pasadena and La Cañada Flintridge; as well as the City of Los Angeles neighborhood of Sunland-Tujunga; 34.216667°N 118.283333°W	251	102	1984	
Watts Towers of Simon Rodia State Historic Park	State historic park	Watts neighborhood, Los Angeles; 33.938739°N 118.241047°W	0.11	0.045	1978	
Will Rogers State Beach	State beach	Pacific Palisades neighborhood of Los Angeles; 34.039722°N 118.560278°W	82	33	1931	
Will Rogers State Historic Park	State historic park	Pacific Palisades neighborhood of Los Angeles; 34.056111°N 118.512222°W	189	76	1944	Former estate of Will Rogers

== Municipal parks of the city of Los Angeles ==
Municipal parks come under the administration of the City of Los Angeles Department of Recreation and Parks. The overseeing body is the Department of Recreation and Park Board of Commissioners. The first parks date back to 1889 under the City's first Freeholder Charter.

Park	Address	Neighborhood	Council District	Park Region	Area (acres)	Notes
105th Street Pocket Park	609 West 105th Street	Magnolia Square	8	Pacific	0.111	
109th Street Recreation Center	1464 East 109th Street	Watts	15	Pacific	3.174	
111th Place Pocket Park	207 East 111th Place	Century Palms	8	Pacific	0.089	
49th Street Park	670 East 49th Street	South Park	9	Pacific	0.189	
61st Street Pocket Park	139 East 61st Street	Florence	9	Pacific	0.118	
76th Street Pocket Park	833 West 76th Street	Vermont-Slauson	8	Pacific	0.128	
97th Street Park	554 West 97th Street	Vermont Vista	8	Metro	0.128	
Albert Piantanida Intergenerational Center	9540 Van Nuys Boulevard	Panorama City	6	Valley	2.663	Former Mid Valley Intergenerational Multipurpose Center
Albion Riverside Park	1739 North Albion Street	Lincoln Park	1	Metro	6.350	
Algin Sutton Recreation Center	8800 South Hoover Street	Vermont Vista	8	Pacific	16.459	
Aliso Canyon Park	18041 Rinaldi Street	Granada Hills	12	Valley	60.449	
Alizondo Drive Park	22103 Alizondo Drive	Woodland Hills	3	Valley	6.654	34.15147°N 118.60706°W
Alma Park	West 21st Street and Meyler Street	San Pedro	15	Pacific	2.264	
Alpine Recreation Center	817 Yale Street	Chinatown	1	Metro	1.937	
Alvarado Terrace Park	1342 South Alvarado Terrace	Pico-Union	1	Metro	0.909	Part of Alvarado Terrace Historic District
Amistad Pocket Park	13116 West Kagel Canyon Street	Pacoima	7	Valley	0.138	
Andrés and María Cárdenas Recreation Center	14740 Blythe Street	Panorama City	6	Valley	0.696	a.k.a. Blythe Street Park
Angeles Mesa Park	2929 West 48th Street	Angeles Mesa	8	Pacific	0.155	
Angels Gate Park	3601 Gaffey Street	San Pedro	15	Pacific	70.444	Adjacent to Point Fermin Park 33.70604°N 118.29481°W
Ascot Hills Park	4371 Multnomah Street	El Sereno	14	Metro	92.437	
Augustus F. Hawkins Nature Park	5790 Compton Avenue	South Los Angeles	9	Pacific	8.116	33.99020°N 118.24658°W
Averill Park	1300 Dodson Avenue	San Pedro	15	Pacific	10.747	
Bandini Canyon Park	West Sepulveda Street between Bandini Street and Marshall Court	San Pedro	15	Pacific	4.974	
Balboa Sports Complex	17015 Burbank Boulevard	Encino	6	Valley	82.342	
Baldwin Hills Recreation Center	5401 Highlight Place	Baldwin Hills	10	West	10.868	
Banning Recreation Center	1331 Eubank Avenue	Wilmington	15	Pacific	21.091	
Barnsdall Art Park	4800 Hollywood Boulevard	East Hollywood	13	Metro	14.593	In Little Armenia
Bee Canyon Park	13150 Sesnon Boulevard	Granada Hills	12	Valley	22.214	
Bell Canyon Park	24544 West Bell Canyon Road	West Hills	12	Valley	122.783	
Bellaire Avenue Park	7960 Bellaire Avenue	Sun Valley	2	Valley	0.139	
Bellevue Recreation Center	826 Lucile Avenue	Silver Lake	13	Metro	9.107	
Benny H. Potter, West Adams Avenues Memorial Park	2413 Second Avenue	West Adams Terrace	10	Griffith-Metro	1.622	
Beverly Glen Park	2448 Angelo Drive	Beverly Glen	5	West	85.737	
Bill Rosendahl Del Rey Park	4601 Alla Road	Del Rey	11	Pacific	4.820	A.k.a. Glen-Alla Park
Bird Sanctuary	2900 North Vermont Avenue	Los Feliz	4	Griffith		In Griffith Park
Bishop Canyon	929 Academy Road	Elysian Park	1	Griffith-Metro		
Bond Area	Los Feliz Boulevard	Los Feliz	4	Griffith-Metro		
Boyle Heights Sports Center	933 South Mott Street	Boyle Heights	14	Metro	8.513	
Brand Park (Memory Garden)	15174 San Fernando Mission Road	Mission Hills	7	Valley	17.748	In front of Mission San Fernando
Branford Park	13306 Branford Street	Arleta	6	Valley	13.376	Includes Branford Recreation Center
Briarwood Park	461 Almaden Court	Beverly Glen	5	Pacific	10.753	
Bronson Canyon	3200 Canyon Drive	Hollywoodland	4	Griffith	74.406	In Griffith Park
Browns Creek Park	Browns Canyon Road	Chatsworth	12	Valley	51.993	
Budd Wiener Park	Via Marisol between Via Colina and Via Arbolada	Monterey Hills	14	Griffith-Metro		
Buena Vista Meadow Picnic Area	Meadow Road	Elysian Park	1	Griffith-Metro		East Side of Dodger Stadium
Robert L. Burns Park	4900 Beverly Boulevard	Windsor Square	13	Griffith-Metro	1.677	
Cabrillo Beach Bath House	3800 Stephen M. White Drive	San Pedro	15	Pacific		
Canal Park	200 Linnie Canal	Venice	11	Pacific	0.131	Also known as Linnie Canal Park
Carey Ranch Park	Laurel Canyon Boulevard & Aztec Street	Mission Hills	7	Valley	23.800	
Carlton Way Park	5927 Carlton Way		13	Valley	0.191	
Carlin G. Smith Recreation Center	511 West Avenue 46	Mount Washington	1	Metro	2.645	
Carthay Circle Park	McCarthy Vista and South San Vicente Boulevard	Carthay Circle	5	Metro	0.975	
Castle Peak Park	24220 1/2 Clarington Drive	West Hills	12	Valley	3.086	A.k.a. Valley Circle/Hillhurst Drive Park
Cedar Grove	Vista Del Valle	Los Feliz	4	Griffith		In Griffith Park
Central Avenue Pocket Park	4222 Central Avenue	South Los Angeles	9	Pacific	0.189	Also known as Central Avenue Jazz Park
Central Park Recreation Center	1357 East 22nd Street		9	Pacific	1.449	
Central Park	12035 East Waterfront Drive	Playa Vista	11	Playa Vista	9	The park features an amphitheater, volleyball, and basketball courts
CETA Forest	5201 Zoo Drive	Los Feliz	4	Griffith		In Griffith Park
Chatsworth Oaks Park	9301 Valley Circle Boulevard	Chatsworth	12	Valley	2.903	
Chatsworth Park North	22300 Chatsworth Street	Chatsworth	12	Valley	24.146	
Chatsworth Park South	22360 Devonshire Street	Chatsworth	12	Valley	73.073	Includes Chatsworth South Recreation Center
Chavez Ravine Arboretum	Chavez Ravine Road	Elysian Park	1	Metro		West side of Stadium Way, near Grace E. Simons Lodge
Chesterfield Square Park	1950 West 54th Street	Chesterfield Square	8	Pacific	1.892	
Cheviot Hills Park	2551 Motor Avenue	Cheviot Hills	5	West	182.613	Includes Cheviot Hills Recreation Center
Chevy Chase Park	4165 Chevy Chase Drive	Atwater Village	13	Metro	2.437	Includes Chevy Chase Recreation Center
Circle Park	West 76th Street and South Gramercy Place	Morningside Circle	8	Pacific	0.174	Roundabout
City Hall Park Center	200 North Main Street	Civic Center	9	Griffith-Metro	1.707	
Cleland Avenue Bicentennial Park	4800 Cleland Avenue	Mount Washington	1	Griffith-Metro	0.920	
Cohasset Melba Park	7449 Melba Avenue	West Hills	3	Valley	1.997	a.k.a. Four Oaks Park
Coldwater Canyon Park	12601 Mulholland Drive	Studio City	4	Valley	41.157	
Costanso Fire Station 84 Park	5340 Canoga Avenue	Canoga Park	3	Valley	0.362	
Country Club Heritage Plaza	1015 South Wilton Place	Country Club Park	10	Metro	0.084	A.k.a. Wilton Place Park & Country Club Park Heritage Plaza
Crestwood Hills Recreation Center	1000 Hanley Avenue	Crestwood Hills	11	West	15.780	
Crystal Springs	4730 Crystal Springs Drive	Los Feliz	4	Griffith		In Griffith Park
Culver/Slauson Park	5070 Slauson Avenue	Cypress Grove	11	Pacific	3.268	Includes Culver Slauson Recreation Center
Curtis Roland Park	1287 West 38th Place	Exposition Park	8	Pacific	0.088	
Cypress Park and Recreation Center	2630 Pepper Avenue	Cypress Park	1	Metro	3.489	
Daniels Field Sports Center	845 West 12th Street	San Pedro	15	Pacific	3.588	
Dave Potell Memorial Sports Facility	11455 Magnolia Boulevard	North Hollywood	2	Valley		
David M. Gonzalez Recreation Center	10943 Herrick Avenue	Pacoima	7	Valley	6.802	a.k.a. Pacoima Recreation Center
De Garmo Park	10145 Arminta Street	Sun Valley	2	Valley	1.645	
De Longpre Park	1350 North Cherokee Avenue	Central Hollywood	13	Griffith-Metro	1.373	
De Neve Square Park	314 Beverly Glen	Beverly Glen	5	Pacific	0.610	34.0847°N 118.4348°W
Denker Recreation Center	1550 West 35th Place	Exposition Park	8	Pacific	2.811	
Dearborn Park	17141 Nordhoff Street	Northridge	12	Valley	9.117	
Del Rey Lagoon	6660 Esplanade Place	Playa del Rey	11	West	10.994	
Delano Recreation Center	15100 Erwin Street	Van Nuys	6	Valley	4.454	34.18210°N 118.46247°W
Denker and Torrance Park	1490 West Torrance Boulevard	Torrance	15	Pacific	0.081	a.k.a. Janet Shour Playground at Harbor Gateway Pocket Park
Devonshire Arleta Park	14215 West Devonshire Street	Arleta	6	Valley	1.823	34.25785°N 118.44316°W
Devonwood Park	10230 Woodman Avenue	Mission Hills	7	Valley	4.837	
Dorothy J. and Benjamin B. Smith Park	7020 Franklin Avenue		13	Griffith-Metro	0.490	
Downey Recreation Center	1739 Albion Street	Lincoln Heights	1	Metro	4.521	
Drum Barracks Park-Warren Oil Expansion	1037 North Banning Boulevard		15	Pacific	0.387	a.k.a. Expansion Banning Lots
Eagle Rock Recreation Center	1100 Eagle Vista Drive	Eagle Rock	14	Griffith-Metro	20.675	Includes the Eagle Rock Child Care Building
East Los Angeles Park	2500 North Eastlake Avenue	Lincoln Heights	1	Griffith-Metro	0.323	
East Wilmington Greenbelt Pocket Park	1300 East O Street	Wilmington	15	Pacific	0.129	
Echo Park Lake	751 Echo Park Ave.	Echo Park	13	Griffith-Metro	28.407	
Echo Park Recreation Center	1632 Bellevue Avenue	Echo Park	13	Griffith-Metro		
Eddleston Park	11820 Reseda Boulevard	Porter Ranch	12	Valley	6.309	
El Paseo de Cahuenga Park	3300 Cahuenga Boulevard	Cahuenga Pass	4	Valley	1.290	
El Sereno Arroyo Playground	5520 Concord Avenue	El Sereno	14	Metro	1.266	
El Sereno Recreation Center	4721 Klamath Street	El Sereno	14	Metro	13.935	
Elysian Park	929 Academy Road	Elysian Park	1	Metro	544.712	Includes Elysian Park Recreation Center
Elysian Valley Recreation Center	1811 Ripple Street	Elysian Valley	13	Metro	1.992	
Encino Glen	16821 Burbank Boulevard	Encino	6	Valley	168.011	Encino Golf Course. Within Sepulveda Basin area
Encino Park	16953 Ventura Boulevard	Encino	4	Valley	5.265	
Ernest E. Debs Regional Park	4235 Montery Road	Montecito Heights	1	Griffith-Metro	318.621	
Everett Triangle Park	Everett Street, one block north of Sunset Boulevard	Victor Heights	1	Griffith-Metro	0.533	A.k.a. Tear Drop Park
Evergreen Recreation Center	2844 East 2nd Street	Boyle Heights	14	Metro	6.656	
Exposition Park	701 State Drive	Exposition Park	9	Expo	10.393	Includes Exposition Park Rose Garden and Roy A. Anderson Recreation Center
Fehlhaber-Houk Park	9521 Tujunga Canyon Boulevard	Tujunga	7	Valley	1.161	
Fernangeles Recreation Center	8851 Laurel Canyon Boulevard	Sun Valley	6	Valley	9.258	
Field of Dreams	Corner of Gaffey Street and Westmont Drive	Wilmington	15	Metro	1.795	a.k.a. Tommy Lasorda Field of Dreams
Howard Finn Park	7747 Foothill Boulevard	Sunland-Tujunga	7	Valley	3.660	
Fox and Laurel Park	14353 Fox Street	Mission Hills	7	Valley	0.276	
Fulton Avenue Park	13255 Vanowen Street	Valley Glen	2	Valley	0.399	
Gage and Avalon Triangle Pocket Park	6301 South Avalon Boulevard	Florence	9	Pacific	0.262	
Garvanza Park	6240 East Meridian Street	Garavanza	14	Metro	5.588	
Genesee Avenue Park	2330 South Genesee Avenue	Mid City	10	West	0.751	
George Wolfberg Park at Potrero Canyon	851 Alma Real Drive	Pacific Palisades	11	West	17.543	a.k.a. Palisades Park, Recreation Center. Easiest parking at Palisades Recreation Center. Information here.
Gilbert W. Lindsay Recreation Center	429 East 42nd Place	Historic South Central	9	Pacific	14.621	
Gladys Jean Wesson Park	2508 West Boulevard		10	Metro	0.212	
John S. Gibson Junior Park	Harbor Boulevard, between 5th and 6th Streets	San Pedro	15	Pacific	0.885	A.k.a. Gibson Park
Gladys Park	624 East 6th Street	Skid Row	14	Metro	0.340	Small urban park with a basketball court 34.04029°N 118.24247°W
Glassell Park	3650 Verdugo Road	Glassell Park	1	Metro	12.688	Includes Glassel Recreation Center and Youth Center
Glenhurst Park	2932 Glenhurst Avenue	Atwater Village	13	Metro	0.292	
Granada Hills Recreation Center	16730 Chatsworth Street	Granada Hills	12	Valley	17.756	
Grand Hope Park	919 South Grand Avenue	South Park	14	Metro	1.990	
Grape Street Pocket Park	10726 South Grape Street	Watts	15	Pacific	0.119	
Greayer's Oak Mini Park	3711 North Figueroa Street	Mount Washington	1	Metro	0.596	
Green Meadows Recreation Center	431 East 89th Street	Green Meadows	9	Pacific	7.636	
Greenwood Square Park	14101 Sherman Way	Van Nuys	6	Valley	0.311	
Griffith Park	4730 Crystal Springs Drive	Los Feliz	4	Griffith	4282.669	
Guardia Park	4410 Garden Homes Avenue	El Sereno	14	Metro	3.077	Formerly El Sereno North Park
Haines Canyon Park	South terminus of Haines Canyon Avenue	Tujunga	2	Valley	52.378	
Hansen Dam Park	12074 West Osborne Street	Lake View Terrace	7	Valley	1449.545	a.k.a. Hansen Dam Recreation Area
Harbor City Park	24901 Frampton Avenue	Harbor City	15	Pacific	11.069	Includes Harbor City Recreation Center
Harbor Highlands Park	825 Capitol Street	San Pedro	15	Pacific	3.242	
Harbor Sports Center	1221 North Figueroa Place	Wilmington	15	Pacific	64.783	
Harold A. Henry Park	890 South Lucerne Avenue	Windsor Village	5	Metro	1.603	
Henry Alvarez Memorial Park	2830 Lancaster Avenue	Brooklyn Heights	14	Metro	2.560	Also known as Crusado Park, part of Ramona Gardens
Hartland Mini Park	6830 North Woodman Avenue	Valley Glen	2	Valley	0.0660	
Hazard Park	2230 Norfolk Street	Brooklyn Heights	14	Metro	24.991	Includes Hazard Recreation Center
Hermon Park	5566 Via Marisol	Hermon	14	Metro	23.526	Formerly Arroyo Seco Park
Highland Park Recreation Center	6150 Piedmont Avenue	Garavanza	14	Metro	5.412	
Hjelte Sports Center	16200 Burbank Boulevard	Encino	6	Valley	14.717	
Holleigh Bernson Memorial Park	20500 Sesnon Boulevard	Porter Ranch	12	Valley	12.509	
Hillhurst Parkway	Hillhurst Avenue between Los Feliz Boulevard & North Vermont Avenue	Los Feliz	4	Griffith		
Hollenbeck Park	415 South Saint Louis Street	Boyle Heights	14	Metro	18.303	Includes Hollenbeck Recreation Center
Hollywood Recreation Center	1122 Cole Avenue	Hollywood	13	Metro	3.117	
Holmby Park	601 Clubview Drive	Holmby Hills	5	West	8.519	Formerly Armand Hammer
Hoover-Gage Park	South Hoover Street and W Gage Avenue	Vermont-Slauson	9	Pacific	0.210	A.k.a. Hoover-Gage Mini Park
Hoover Recreation Center	1010 West 25th Street	North University Park	1	Metro	2.951	
Hope and Peace Pocket Park	843 South Bonnie Brae Street	Westlake	1	Metro	0.568	
Howard Finn Park	7747 Foothill Boulevard	Tujunga	7	Valley	3.661	a.k.a. Finn Park & Howard Finn Park-Community Garden
Hubert H. Humphrey Memorial Park	12560 Fillmore Street	Pacoima	7	Valley	9.989	a.k.a. Hubert H. Humphrey Memorial Recreation Center
Irving Schachter Park	2599 Beverwil Drive	Beverlywood	5	West	0.315	Formerly Beverwill Mini Park
Jacaranda Park	700 East 98th Street	Green Meadows	8	Pacific	5.220	
Jackie Tatum/Harvard Recreation Center	1535 West 62nd Street	Harvard Park	8	Pacific	12.875	
Jaime Beth Slavin Park	7965 Whitsett Avenue	North Hollywood	2	Valley	6.952	
Jesse Owens Mini Park	7100 White Oak Avenue	Lake Balboa	6	Valley	1.642	
Jim Gilliam Recreation Center	4000 South La Brea Avenue	Baldwin Village	10	West	17.625	
Joan Milke Flores Park	834 Paseo del Mar	San Pedro	15	Pacific		
Julian C. Dixon Park	4800 South Hoover	Vermont Square	9	Pacific	0.961	Formerly 48th Street Park
Juntos Park	3135 Drew Street	Glassell Park	13	Metro	1.638	
Kagel Canyon Park	11435 Kagel Canyon Street	Lake View Terrace	7	Valley	3.464	
Ken Malloy Harbor Regional Park	25820 South Vermont Avenue	Harbor City	15	Pacific	290.872	
Kittridge Mini-park	6565 Greenbush Avenue	Valley Glen	2	Valley	0.092	
Knapp Ranch Park	25000 West Kittridge Street	West Hills	3	Valley	69.109	
L.A.C.E.S. Recreation Center	5931 West 18th Street	Faircrest Heights	10	West	7.442	
L.A.P.D. S.W.A.T. Officer Randal D. Simmons Park	6731 Wilbur Avenue	Reseda	3	Valley	8.081	Formerly West Valley Park
L.A. High Memorial Park	4625 West Olympic Boulevard	Brookside	5	Metro	2.507	
La Mirada Park	5401 La Mirada Avenue		13	Metro	0.172	
Lacy Street Neighborhood Park	Avenue 26 and Lacy Street	Lincoln Heights	1	Metro	0.366	Next to the Pasadena Freeway
Lafayette Park	625 South La Fayette Park Place	Westlake and Wilshire Center	10	Metro	9.717	Includes Lafayette Multipurpose Community Center
Lake Balboa / Anthony C. Beilenson Park	6300 Balboa Boulevard	Lake Balboa	6	Valley	169.243	Within Sepulveda Basin area
Lake Hollywood Park	3160 Canyon Lake Drive	Hollywoodland	4	Griffith	2.416	
Lake Street Park	227 North Lake Street	Historic Filipinotown	13	Metro	1.518	Includes Lake Street Community Center
Lake View Terrace Recreation Center	11075 Foothill Boulevard	Lakeview Terrace	7	Valley	9.812	Includes Lake View Terrace Equestrian Arena
Lanark Recreation Center	21816 Lanark Street	Canoga Park	3	Valley	19.198	
Lanark / Shelby Mini Park	Lanark Street & Shelby Place	Eagle Rock	14	Metro	0.274	
Latham Park	5308 S. Latham Street	South Los Angeles	9	Pacific	0.193	
Laurel Canyon Park	8260 West Mulholland Drive	Laurel Canyon	5	Valley	23.445	
Laurel Grove Park	6226 Laurelgrove Avenue	North Hollywood	2	Valley	3.036	
Lazy J. Ranch Park	Valley Circle and Ingomar Street	West Hills	12	Valley	8.433	
Leimert Plaza Park	4395 Leimert Boulevard	Leimert Park	10	West	1.144	
Leland Park	863 South Herbert Avenue	San Pedro	15	Pacific	15.762	Includes Leland Recreation Center
Lemon Grove Recreation Center	4959 Lemon Grove Avenue		13	Metro	3.871	
Leslie N. Shaw Park	2223 West Jefferson Boulevard	Jeffereson Park	10	Pacific	0.657	
Libbit Park	5101 Libbitt Avenue	Encino	4	Valley	24.515	
Lilac Terrace Park	1254 West Lilac Terrace	Elysian Park	1	Metro	2.831	A.k.a. Victory Memorial Grove Park
Limekiln Canyon Park	19585 Rinaldi Street	Porter Ranch	12	Valley	95.781	
Lincoln Heights Recreation Center	2303 Workman Street	Lincoln Heights	1	Metro	2.877	
Lincoln Heights Youth Center Complex	2911 Altura Street	Lincoln Heights	1	Metro	0.738	
Lincoln Park	3501 Valley Boulevard	Lincoln Heights	14	Metro	42.811	Includes Lincoln Park Recreation Center / Senior Citizen Center
Little Green Acres Park-Community Garden	10420 South Vermont Avenue	Magnolia Square	8	Pacific	0.229	
Little Landers Park	10110 Commerce Avenue	Tujunga	7	Valley	1.144	
Lookout Point Park	3515 South Gaffey Street	San Pedro	15	Pacific	1.387	
Loren Miller Recreation Center	2717 Halldale Avenue	West Adams	8	Pacific	2.416	
Los Angeles River & Aliso Creek Confluence Park	Kittridge Street & Archwood Street	Reseda	3	Valley	2.591	
Los Angeles Sister Cities Plaza	406 North Gaffey Street	San Pedro	15	Pacific	0.333	
Lou Costello Junior Recreation Center	3141 East Olympic Boulevard	Boyle Heights	14	Metro	3.456	
Louise Park	7140 Louise Avenue	Lake Balboa	12	Valley	6.481	
MacArthur Park	2230 West 6th Street	Westlake	1	Metro	29.869	Little Central America. Includes Community Center
Madison Avenue Park and Community Garden	1177 North Madison Avenue	East Hollywood	13	Metro	0.560	
Madison West Park	464 North Madison Avenue	Dayton Heights	13	Metro	0.516	
Mae Boyar Park	23936 Highlander Road	West Hills	3	Valley	2.230	
Mandeville Canyon Park	2660 North Westridge Road	Mandeville Canyon	11	West	131.198	
Martin J. Bogdanovich Recreation Center	1920 Cumbre Drive	San Pedro	15	Pacific	13.515	
Martin Luther King Junior Park	3916 South Western Avenue	King Estates	8	Pacific	6.532	Includes Recreation Center
Mar Vista Recreation Center	11430 Woodbine Avenue	Westdale	11	West	18.506	
Mascot Park	Mascot Street & Pickford Street	Arlington Heights Terrace	10	Metro	0.191	
Mason Recreation Center	10500 Mason Avenue	Chatsworth	12	Valley	17.069	
McGroarty Park	7570 McGroarty Terrace	Tujunga	7	Valley	16.894	A.k.a. Pasko Park
McKinley Avenue Park	4916 South McKinley Avenue	South Park	9	Pacific	0.105	
Mecca Avenue Park	5250 Mecca Avenue	Tarzana	3	Valley	0.184	
Media Park	9070 West Venice Boulevard	Palms	5	West	1.084	
Michelle and Barack Obama Sports Complex	5001 Obama Boulevard	Crenshaw	10	West	28.968	a.k.a. Rancho Cienega Sports Complex
Montecillo de Leo Politi Park	On Stadium between Scott Road & Academy Road	Elysian Park	1			
Montecito Heights Recreation Center	4545 Homer Street	Montecito Heights	1	Metro	22.534	
Moon Canyon Park	911 North Museum Drive	Mount Washington	1	Metro	4.493	
Moonshine Canyon Park	19900 West Sesnon Boulevard	Porter Ranch	12	Valley	25.881	
Moorpark Park	12061 Moorpark Street	Studio City	4	Valley	3.217	
Mount Carmel Park	830 West 70th Street	Vermont-Slauson	8	Pacific	3.406	Includes Recreation Center
Norman O. Houston Park	4800 South La Brea	Baldwin Hills Estates	8	West	9.499	
Normandale Recreation Center	22400 South Halldale Avenue	Harbor Gateway South	15	Pacific	8.319	
Normandie Recreation Center	1550 South Normandie Avenue	Pico-Union	1	Metro	3.276	
North Atwater Park	3900 West Chevy Chase Drive	Atwater Village	4	Griffith	5.362	
North Hills Community Park	8756 Parthenia Place	North Hills	6	Valley	3.895	A.k.a. Sepulveda Park West
North Hollywood Park	11430 Chandler Boulevard	North Hollywood	2	Valley	55.600	a.k.a. North Hollywood Recreation Center
North Weddington Park	10844 Acama Drive	Studio City	2	Valley	10.213	a.k.a. North Weddington Recreation Center
Northridge Recreation Center	18300 Lemarsh Street	Northridge	12	Valley	24.018	
O'Melveny Park	17300 Sesnon Boulevard	Granada Hills	12	Valley	695.714	
Oakridge Estate Park	18650 Devonshire Street	Northridge	12	Valley	9.335	
Oakwood Recreation Center	767 California Avenue	Oakwood	11	West	3.633	
Occidental Parkway	South Occidental Boulevard (Between 6th Street & Beverly Boulevard)	Westlake	1, 13	Metro		
Orchard Avenue Park	4600 South Orchard Avenue	Vermont Harbor	9	Pacific	0.141	Pocket park
Orcutt Ranch Horticultural Center and Community Garden	23600 Roscoe Boulevard	West Hills	12	Valley	24.096	
Ord and Yale Street Park	524 Ord Street	Chinatown	1	Metro	0.595	
Oro Vista Park	11101 Oro Vista Avenue	Sunland-Tujunga	7	Valley	8.231	
Palms Park	2950 Overland Avenue	Rancho Park	5	West	4.809	Includes Rosalind "Roz" Wyman Recreation Center and the Palms-Rancho Park Branch Library
Pan Pacific Park	7600 Beverly Boulevard	Fairfax	5	Metro	32.178	Includes Recreation Center
Panorama Recreation Center	8600 Hazeltine Avenue	Panorama City	6	Valley	6.001	
Parthenia Park	21444 Parthenia Street	Canoga Park	3	Valley	1.420	
Patton Street Park	327 Patton Street	Echo Park	1	Metro	0.695	
Pecan Recreation Center	145 South Pecan Street	Boyle Heights	14	Metro	4.280	
Peck Park	560 North Western Avenue	San Pedro	15	Pacific	74.520	Includes Community Center
Penmar Recreation Center	1341 Lake Street	Venice	11	West	12.006	
Pershing Square	532 South Olive Street	Historic Core	9	Metro	4.437	In September 2026, the LA City Council voted to rename this park "Biddy Mason Park".
Pico Union Vest Pocket Park	1827 South Hoover Street	Pico Heights	1	Metro	0.722	
Poinsettia Park	7341 Willoughby Avenue	Hollywood	5	Metro	6.293	Includes Recreation Center
Point Fermin Park	807 Paseo del Mar	San Pedro	15	Pacific	39.130	Adjacent to Angels Gate Park
Porter Ridge Park	Reseda Boulevard and Sesnon Boulevard	Porter Ranch	12	Valley	17.781	
Prospect Park	Echandia Street & Judson Street	Brooklyn Heights	14	Metro	2.712	
Queen Anne Park	1240 West Boulevard	Mid-Wilshire	10	Metro	5.232	Includes Recreation Center
Quimby Park	7008 De Soto Avenue	Winnetka	3	Valley	3.824	A.k.a. John Quimby Park
Monsignor Ramón García Recreation Center	1016 South Fresno Street	Boyle Heights	14	Metro	6.495	Former Fresno Park Recreation Center
Ramona Gardens Park	2800 Fowler St., Los Angeles, CA 90033	Brooklyn Heights	14	Metro	6.400	
Rena Park	510 Leland Avenue	San Pedro	15	Pacific	1.277	
Reseda Park	18411 Victory Boulevard	Reseda	3	Valley	29.679	Includes Reseda Recreation Center
Reynier Park	2803 Reynier Avenue	Reynier Village	10	West	1.030	
Richard Alatorre Park	Figueroa and 134 Freeway	Eagle Rock	14	Metro	1.460	
Richardson Family Park	2700 South Budlong Avenue	West Adams	8	Pacific	0.321	
Ritchie Valens Park	10731 Laurel Canyon Boulevard	Pacoima	7	Valley	25.767	Formerly Paxton Park, includes Recreation Center
Rivas Canyon Park	Easterly Terminus of Oracle Place	Pacific Palisades	11	West	25.756	
Robertson Recreation Center	1641 Preuss Road	Crestview	5	West	1.236	
Roger W. Jessup Park	12467 West Osborne	Pacoima	7	Valley	14.414	
Roscoe-Valley Circle Park	Valley Circle & Roscoe Blvd	West Hills	3	Valley	44.348	
Rose Hill Park	3606 North Boundary Avenue	Rose Hill	14	Metro	2.264	
Rose Hill Recreation Center	4530 Mercury Avenue	Rose Hill	14	Metro	25.832	
Rosecrans Park	840 West 149th Street	Gardena	15	Pacific	10.548	Includes Recreation Center
Ross Snyder Recreation Center	1501 East 41st Street	South Los Angeles	9	Pacific	11.342	
Ross Valencia Community Park	East 1st Street and Chicago Street	Boyle Heights	14	Metro	0.264	Formerly Lani Vest Pocket Park
Runnymede Park	20200 Runnymede Street	Winnetka	3	Valley	5.931	
Runyon Canyon Park	2000 North Fuller Avenue	Hollywood Hills West	4	Griffith	141.499	
Rustic Canyon Recreation Center	601 Latimer Road	Pacific Palisades	11	West	8.950	
Rustic Canyon Park	Southwest of Sullivan Fire Road	Pacific Palisades	11	West	44.691	
Saint Andrews Recreation Center	8701 Saint Andrews Place	Gramercy Park	8	Pacific	8.576	
Saint James Park	Adams Boulevard & Severance Street	North University Park	1	Metro	0.898	
San Julian Park	312 East 5th Street	Skid Row	14	Metro	0.293	
San Pascual Park	930 San Pasqual Avenue	Garvanza	14	Metro	13.360	
San Pedro Plaza Park	7000 South Beacon Street	San Pedro	15	Pacific	3.506	
San Pedro Welcome Park	415 North Gaffey Street	San Pedro	15	Pacific	0.399	
San Vicente Mountain Park	17500 Mulholland Drive	Mandeville Canyon	11	West	31.451	
Santa Ynez Canyon Park	Palisades Drive and Avenida De Santa Ynez	Pacific Palisades	11	West	337.844	
Benny H. Potter West Adams Avenues Memorial Park	2413 Second Avenue	West Adams Terrace	10	Metro	1.622	Formerly Second Avenue Park
Sean Brown Park	22525 Chase Street	West Hills	12	Valley	5.966	Formerly Chase Park
Seily Rodriguez Park	5707 Lexington Avenue	Hollywood Studio District	13	Metro	0.344	Formerly Lexington Pocket Park
Selma Park	6567 Selma Avenue	Hollywood-Highland	13	Metro	0.224	Corner of Selma and Schrader
Seoul International Park	3250 San Marino Street	Koreatown	10	Metro	3.466	Includes Ardmore Recreation Center
Sepulveda Basin Recreation Area	17017 Burbank Boulevard	Encino	6	Valley	1538.603	Within Sepulveda Basin area
Sepulveda Basin Sports Complex	6201 Balboa Boulevard	Encino	6	Valley		Within Sepulveda Basin area
Sepulveda Recreation Center	8825 Kester Avenue	Panorama City	6	Valley	10.587	
Serrania Avenue Park	20864 Wells Drive	Woodland Hills	3	Valley	36.541	
Shadow Ranch Park	22633 Vanowen Street	West Hills	12	Valley	12.035	Includes Recreation Center
Shatto Park	3191 West 4th Street	Rampart Village	10	Metro	5.454	Includes Recreation Center
Sheldon Arleta Park	12455 Wicks Street	Sun Valley	6	Valley	45.159	
Sherman Oaks Castle Park	4989 Sepulveda Boulevard	Sherman Oaks	4	Valley	4.978	
Silver Lake Recreation Center	1850 West Silver Lake Drive	Silver Lake	13	Metro	3.935	
James Slauson Recreation Center	5306 South Compton Avenue		9	Pacific	3.628	
Dorothy J. & Benjamin B. Smith Park	7020 Franklin Avenue	Hollywood-Highland	13	Metro	0.490	
South Los Angeles Sports Activity Center	7020 South Figueroa Street		8	Pacific	0.741	
South Los Angeles Wetlands Park	5413 South Avalon Boulevard	South Park	9	Pacific	9.006	
South Park Recreation Center	345 East 51st Street	South Park	9	Pacific	18.250	a.k.a. Barry White Park
South Victoria Avenue Park	6537 South Victoria Avenue	Park Mesa Heights	8	Pacific	0.261	Pocket park
South Weddington Park	10600 Valleyheart Drive	Studio City	2	Valley	14.484	
Spring Street Park	428 South Spring Street	Downtown Los Angeles	14	Metro	0.796	
State Street Park	716 North State Street	Boyle Heights	14	Metro	2.617	Includes Recreation Center
Stetson Ranch Park	13877 Glenoaks Boulevard	Sylmar	7	Valley	28.309	
Stonehurst Recreation Center	9901 Dronfield Street	Sun Valley	7	Valley	13.709	
Stoner Recreation Center	1835 Stoner Avenue		11	West	8.656	
Stoney Point Park	On Topanga Canyon Boulevard between Chatsworth Street and 118 Freeway	Chatsworth	12	Valley	29.056	
Strathern Park North	8041 Whitsett Avenue	Sun Valley	6	Valley	12.735	
Strathern Park West	12541 Saticoy Street	Sun Valley	6	Valley	9.377	
Studio City Mini Park	12505 Moorpark Street at Whitsett Avenue	Studio City	4	Valley	0.427	
Studio City Recreation Center	12621 Rye Street	Studio City	4	Valley	8.464	
Sullivan Canyon Park	Sullivan Canyon Road	Brentwood	11	West	23.286	Northeast of Sullivan Canyon Road
Sun Valley Recreation Center	8133 Vineland Avenue	Sun Valley	6	Valley	17.261	
Sunland Park	8651 Foothill Boulevard	Sunland	7	Valley	14.322	Includes Recreation Center
Sunnynook River Park	Los Angeles River Bike Path		4	Metro	0.957	
Sun Valley Park	8133 Vineland Avenue	Sun Valley	6	Valley	17.261	Includes Sun Valley Recreation Center
Sycamore Grove Park	4702 North Figueroa Street	Sycamore Grove	1	Metro	15.874	Includes Ramona Hall Community Center
Sylmar Park	13109 Borden Avenue	Sylmar	7	Valley	19.776	Includes Sylmar Park Recreation Center
Tarzana Recreation Center	5655 Vanalden Avenue	Tarzana	3	Valley	5.572	
Taxco Trails Park	23367 Ingomar Street	West Hills	3	Valley	2.455	
Telfair Park	15721 Cobalt Avenue	Sylmar	7	Valley	1.293	A.k.a. Valleycrest Park
Temescal Canyon Park	15900 Pacific Coast Highway	Pacific Palisades	11	West	37.590	
Tiara Street Park	11480 West Tiara Street	North Hollywood	2	Valley	1.563	
Titmouse Park	415 Culver Boulevard	Playa del Rey	11	West	0.287	
Toberman Park	1725 Toberman Street	Pico-Union	1	Metro	2.739	Includes Recreation Center
Tobias Avenue Park	9122 Tobias Avenue	Panorama City	6	Valley	1.611	
Triangle Park	Oxford Avenue and Marr Street	Venice	11	West	0.091	
Trinity Park	2415 Trinity Street		9	Pacific	2.063	Includes Recreation Center
Unidad Park	1644 West Beverly Boulevard	Westlake North	1	Metro	0.324	a.k.a. Beverly Pocket Park
Valley Glen Community Park	Erwin Street and Ethel Avenue	Valley Glen	2	Valley	5.698	Formerly Erwin Park
Valley Plaza Recreation Center	12240 Archwood Street	North Hollywood	2	Valley	77.641	Includes Whitsett Sports Fields
Valley Village Park	5000 Westpark Drive	Valley Village	12	Valley	6.471	
Vanalden Park	8956 Vanalden Avenue	Northridge	12	Valley	10.885	
Van Ness Recreation Center	5720 2nd Avenue	Hyde Park	8	Pacific	7.814	
Van Norman Lakes Reservoir	15800 Rinaldi Street	Granada Hills	12	Valley	10.897	
Van Nuys Recreation Center	14301 Vanowen Avenue	Van Nuys	6	Valley	3.894	
Van Nuys Sherman Oaks Recreation Center	14201 Huston Street	Sherman Oaks	4	Valley	65.176	
Venice Beach Recreation Center and Ocean Front Walk	1800 Ocean Front Walk	Venice	11	West	160.753	
Venice of America Centennial Park	501 South Venice Boulevard	Venice	11	West	0.886	
Verdugo Mountain Park	East of Sunland, south of La Tuna Canyon Road	La Tuna Canyon	7	Valley	587.976	
Vermont and Gage Park	960 West 62nd Place	South Los Angeles	9	Pacific	0.313	Pocket park
Vermont Miracle Park	956 West 81st Street	Vermont Knolls	8	Pacific	0.219	
Vermont Square Park	1248 West 47th Street	Vermont Square	9	Pacific	3.009	
Veterans' Barrington Park	333 South Barrington Avenue	Brentwood	11	West	13.732	Includes Barrington Recreation Center
Via Dolce Park	3503 Via Dolce	Marina del Rey	11	West	0.145	
Victory Vineland Recreation Center	11117 Victory Boulevard	North Hollywood	2	Valley	6.482	
Viking Park	Nau Avenue and Viking Avenue	Northridge	12	Valley	10.069	
Villa Cabrini Park	9401 Cabrini Drive West	La Tuna Canyon	7	Valley	17.072	
Vineyard Recreation Center	2942 Vineyard Avenue	West Adams	10	West	0.926	
Vista del Mar Park	Vista del Mar Boulevard and Century Boulevard	Playa del Rey	11	West	1.409	
Vista Hermosa Park	100 North Toluca Street	Temple-Beaudry	1	Metro		MRCA park, Department manages soccer field
Wabash Park	2765 Wabash Avenue	Boyle Heights	14	Metro	1.872	
Warner Center Park	5800 Topanga Canyon Boulevard	Warner Center	3	West	16.679	A.k.a. Warner Ranch Park
Washington Irving Pocket Park	4103 West Washington Boulevard	Arlington Heights	10	Metro	0.126	In Oaxacatown
Wattles Garden Park	1850 North Curson Avenue	Nichols Canyon	4	Metro	47.581	
Watts Serenity Park	11300 Monitor Avenue	Watts	15	Pacific	1.123	a.k.a. Monitor Avenue Park
West Adams Heights Park	1903 West Cordova	West Adams Heights	10	Metro	0.088	a.k.a. Normandie and Cordova Park
West Hills Sports Center/Adam Bischoff Soccer Fields	6900 Valley Circle Drive	West Hills	12	Valley	15.052	
West Lakeside Street Park	15720 West Bledsoe Street	Sylmar	7	Valley	6.162	
Westchester Park	7000 West Manchester Avenue	Westchester	11	West	23.579	Includes Recreation Center
Westside Neighborhood Park	3085 Clyde Avenue	West Los Angeles	10	West	3.977	
Westwood Recreation Center	1350 Sepulveda Boulevard	Westwood	5	Valley	26.696	34.0525°N 118.4482°W
White Point Park	1600 West Paseo del Mar	San Pedro	15	Pacific	95.004	Nature preserve
Whitsett Fields Park	12240 Archwood Street	North Hollywood	2	Valley	30.624	
Wilacre Park	12601 Mulholland Drive	Studio City	4	Valley	125.135	Adjacent to Coldwater Canyon Park
Wilbur-Tampa Park	12001 Wilbur Avenue	Northridge	12	Valley	7.288	
Wilder's Addition park	607 Paseo Del Mar	San Pedro	15	Pacific		
William S. Hart Park	8341 De Longpre Avenue	Center City	N/A	N/A	0.833	
Wilmington Recreation Center	325 North Neptune Avenue	Wilmington	15	Pacific	7.306	
Wilmington Town Square Park	105 West I Street	Wilmington	15	Pacific	0.484	
Winnetka Park	8401 Winnetka Avenue	Winnetka	3	Valley	15.948	Includes Recreation Center
Woodbine Park	3409 South Vinton Avenue	Palms	5	West	0.668	
Woodbridge Park	11240 Moorpark Street	Studio City	2	Valley	4.707	
Woodland Hills Park	5858 Shoup Avenue	Woodland Hills	3	Valley	18.759	Includes Recreation Center
Woodley Park	6350 Woodley Avenue	Van Nuys	6	Valley	109.665	A.k.a. Woodley Avenue Park
Yaangna Park	540 North Los Angeles Street & 125 Paseo de la Plaza	El Pueblo de Los Ángeles	14	Metro	0.801	Formerly Los Angeles Plaza Park
York Boulevard Park	4948 York Boulevard	York Valley	14	Metro	0.294	A.k.a. York Park.
Yosemite Recreation Center	1840 Yosemite Drive	Eagle Rock	14	Metro	10.003	
Yucca Park	6671 Yucca Street	Yucca Corridor	13	Metro	0.972	Includes Community Center
Zelzah Park	11690 Zelzah Avenue	Granada Hills	12	Valley	9.736	

== MRCA parks in Los Angeles ==
The Mountains Recreation and Conservation Authority manages multiple parks and open spaces within the city of Los Angeles.

Park Name	Location		Notes
Park Name	Address	Neighborhood	Notes
Egret Park	Riverside Drive & Arnold Street	Elysian Valley	Along Los Angeles River Greenway.
Elyria Canyon Park	1550 Bridgeport Drive	Mount Washington	
Elysian Valley Gateway Park	2914 Knox Avenue	Elysian Valley	Along Los Angeles River Greenway.
Elysian Valley River Recreation Zone		Elysian Valley	One of two Los Angeles River Recreation Zones.
Franklin Canyon Park	2600 Franklin Canyon Drive	Franklin Canyon	
Franklin-Ivar Park	1900 Ivar Avenue	Hollywood Dell	
Fryman Canyon Park	8401 Mullholland Drive	Studio City	
Garden of the Gods	Redmesa Road	Chatsworth	
Rattlesnake Park	Fletcher Drive, north of Ripple Street	Elysian Valley	Includes Great Heron Gates. Along Los Angeles River Greenway.
La Tuna Canyon Park	8000 La Tuna Canyon Road	La Tuna Canyon	
Lewis MacAdams Riverfront Park	2999 Rosanna Street	Elysian Valley	Formerly Marsh Park. Along Los Angeles River Greenway.
Los Angeles River Center & Gardens	570 West Avenue 26	Cypress Park	Along Los Angeles River Greenway.
Sepulveda Basin LA River Recreation Zone		Encino / Lake Balboa	One of two Los Angeles River Recreation Zones.
Marvin Braude Mulholland Gateway Park	3600 Reseda Boulevard	Tarzana	
Milton Street Park	12500 Milton Street	Del Rey	Provides access to the Ballona Creek Trail and Bike Path
Mulholland Scenic Parkway and Corridor	Mulholland Drive		Includes multiple MRCA overlooks
Oso Park	Oros Street & Riverside Drive	Elysian Valley	Along Los Angeles River Greenway.
Richard Lillard Outdoor Classroom	Valleyheart Drive & Longridge Avenue	Studio City	
San Vicente Mountain Park	17500 Mulholland Drive	Encino & Mandeville Canyon	
Steelhead Park	Oros Street	Elysian Valley	Along Los Angeles River Greenway.
Temescal Gateway Park	15601 Sunset Boulevard	Pacific Palisades	
Trebek Open Space	2500 Nichols Canyon Road	Nichols Canyon	
Vista Hermosa Natural Park	100 North Toluca Street	Temple-Beaudry	
Westridge-Canyonback Wilderness Park	Mandeville Canyon Road	Mandeville Canyon	
Wilacre Park	3431 Fryman Road	Studio City	
Wilson Canyon Park	14450 Olive View Drive	Sylmar	Mostly outside city limits.

== See also ==
- List of parks in Los Angeles County, California
