= Westminster Presbyterian Church (Los Angeles) =

Active Christian community

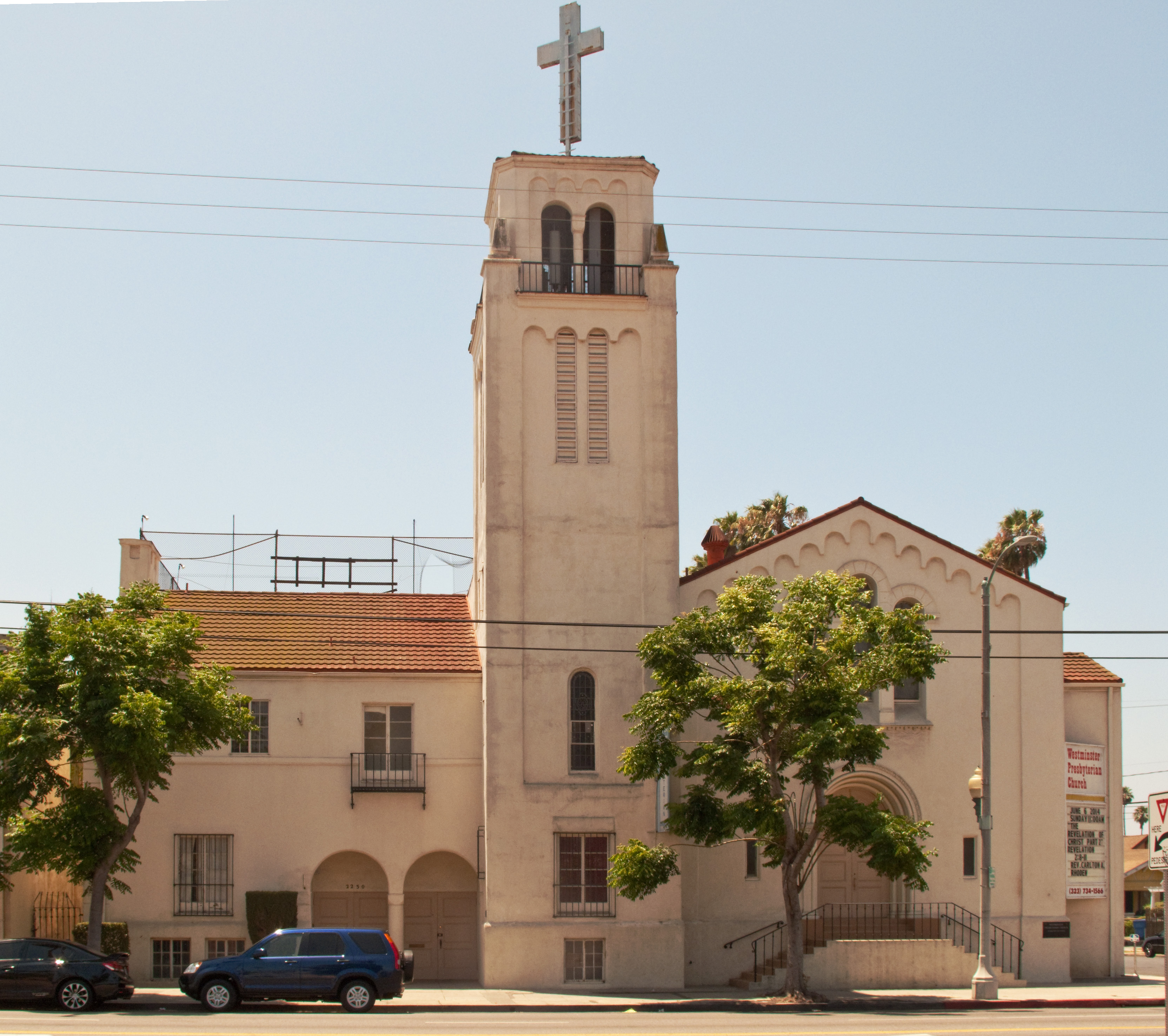
- Westminster Presbyterian Church, Los Angeles, California
- Westminster Presbyterian Church
- 34°1′31.04″N 118°19′11.27″W
- Location: 2230 West Jefferson Blvd., Los Angeles, CA 90018
- Country: United States
- Denomination: Presbyterian Church (USA)
- Website: https://www.wpcofla.org/

History
- Founded: October 9, 1904

Architecture
- Architect(s): Scott Quentin (Alhambra, CA)
- Style: Romanesque
- Years built: 1931

Westminster Presbyterian Church is in the Jefferson Park neighborhood of Los Angeles, California. Westminster Presbyterian Church is a member of the Presbyterian Church (U.S.A.), the Synod of Southern California and Hawaii and Pacific Presbytery. The congregation, established in 1904, is one of the oldest African American Presbyterian churches in California and west of the Mississippi River.

== History ==
In the early 1900s a group of eighteen African Americans met on Sunday afternoons at Central Presbyterian Church in Los Angeles. Over time the group appealed to the Los Angeles Presbytery to come under "care and development" and on October 21, 1904, the group was received and organized as a church under the name Westminster Presbyterian Church. Rev. Enos P. Baker acted as minister-in-charge.

The Los Angeles Times covered the dedication of the congregation's first church building at West 35th Place and Denker Avenue, "reached by the West Jefferson car line." The congregation paid for the $3,300 property in full. The dedication sermon in 1908 was given by Dr. Hugh K. Walker of Immanuel Presbyterian Church. The newspaper noted it believed the congregation was the "only colored Presbyterian church on this coast" and one which "promises to become a strong church." The Los Angeles Herald newspaper reported that the congregation was "the only Presbyterian church in Los Angeles doing a special work" among an estimated 1,500 African Americans in Los Angeles at the time.

=== Rev. Robert W. Holman ===
Rev. R. W. Holman, who arrived from South Carolina, was installed May 17, 1908 as Westminster Presbyterian Church's first pastor. Holman was a graduate of Wallingford Institute and author of "National Plague Spots, or the Reproachful Sins of the American People." He had previously served fourteen years as pastor of Zion Presbyterian Church in Charleston, South Carolina, "the oldest and largest colored Presbyterian church [there]."

The Los Angeles Evening Express reported that Holman was "the first colored pastor to occupy a pulpit of the Presbyterian denomination on the Pacific coast." Later in the year, several African-American churches organized a program to raise funds for a gymnasium at the YWCA at Eighth and San Pedro streets to serve African-American residents. Holman was one of the featured speakers as well as Mrs. Lucy Stanton, the first Black woman to graduate from a four-year college.

By 1909, the church had forty members. The church parsonage was located at 3232 Denker Street.

=== Rev. Hampton B. Hawes, Sr. ===
In 1912, Rev. Hampton B. Hawes, a graduate of Fisk University and Lincoln University Theological Seminary, was installed as pastor following Rev. Holman's retirement. Two years later, he married Gertrude Holman, one of Holman's daughters and church pianoist. In 1937, Hawes was elected Moderator of the Los Angeles Presbytery at a meeting with 325 ministers and lay delegates.

The late 1930s and early 1940s saw congregational growth. Hawes supported the building of a recreational center for community young people. On his 26th anniversary of service, the Westminster Sunday School classes, led by superintendents La Vonzell Gates and Neile Adams, celebrated Hawes. In 1941, the church had 19 Bible school classrooms and two Sunday services. The Westminster Presbyterian Choir had 40-members. Mabel Hawes, another daughter of Hawes, was organist. Cyrus Keller was the choir director. In 1944, Hawes was unanimously elected Moderator of the California Synod of the Presbyterian Church (USA).

Westminster organized a Boy Scout Troop in 1947. In 1957, Golden State Mutual Insurance provided free tickets to Westminster's Scout Troop 205 to attend the annual high school football Shrine Hi Classic at the Los Angeles Coliseum.

In 1948, the Los Angeles Times reported that Westminster Presbyterian Church paid $125,000 for the property being vacated by St. Paul's Presbyterian Church located at 2230 West Jefferson Boulevard. St. Paul's congregation was merging with Baldwin Hills Community Presbyterian Church and moving to the facility on La Brea Ave. and Coliseum Street. The newspaper noted there were 800 active Westminster Presbyterian Church members. On Sunday, June 19, 1949, the Westminster caravan traveled from its 35th and Denker location to its new home at 3rd and Jefferson. The first service was held Sunday evening.

One of the defining community projects of Hawes' tenure, following a visit to Seoul with Dr. Henry A. McPherson, was his campaign to procure homes for homeless and unwanted Korean War orphans of "Negro" paternity. The California Eagle reported in 1956 that more than thirty families had "made applications for adoption proceedings." By 1958, more than fifty families had been recommended for the adoption program, which was directed by Henry Holt.

In 1958, Hawes celebrated forty-five years of service to Westminster Presbyterian Church. The congregation gifted him a 1958 Ford Mercury automobile. Mrs. Sarah A. McPherson, one of the original members of Westminster, gave the car keys to Rev. and Mrs. Hawes. At his retirement service, Hawes had been instrumental in placing 70 Korean orphans for adoption, including 40 within Westminster Presbyterian Church families. The Los Angeles Sentinel photographed Hawes with a dozen adoptees attending the retirement service. Church membership had increased to 1,500 upon his retirement.

=== Rev. Dr. James E. Jones ===
The 1960s saw increased visibility for Westminster Presbyterian Church because of the community and political activism of its new pastor. Rev. James E. Jones, formerly pastor at St. John's Presbyterian Church in Detroit and director of the St. John's Community House, became the new leader at Westminster. Church members reported that Jones had "already captured the hearts of the membership and [had] proposed an impressive program for the church. Membership reached approximately 1,600, according to news reports.

In 1963, Jones traveled to Brazil for a 30-day, nine-city trip to build bridges with Brazilian churches. Previously the church created a two-year fraternal pastoral relationship with Brazilian Rev. Zacharias Bravo. Bravo was responsible for evangelism and established 85 neighborhood prayer and Bible study groups during his tenure.

During the tenure of Jones, in the early 1960s, Frederick K. C. Price, who later became an author, televangelist and founder of the Los Angeles-based Crenshaw Christian Center, was an active member of Westminster Presbyterian Church.

Jones served on the Los Angeles Board of Education from 1965 to 1969 and was elected Board president in 1968. He was the first African American to be elected to that office, where he advocated for voluntary busing to integrate Los Angeles schools. Following the 1965 Watts Riots, California governor Edmund G. "Pat" Brown, Sr. named Jones to the eight-member McCone Commission to study the factors behind the riots and opportunities for future corrections. In 1966, President Lyndon B. Johnson invited Jones to serve on the White House's planning conference called "To Fulfill These Rights." Jones was an active member of the National Association for the Advancement of Colored People (NAACP) and marched with the Rev. Martin Luther King, Jr. in Selma, Alabama. Jones was also a consultant to the national advisory committee planning the children's television program Sesame Street.

In 1974, Westminster celebrated its 70th anniversary. Los Angeles Mayor Thomas Bradley, who had been in office nearly two years, was a featured speaker at the anniversary program.

In 1975, the Rev. Michael Livingston was ordained a Presbyterian minister at Westminster, his home church. He would later serve as assistant pastor of St. Paul's Presbyterian Church in Los Angeles and Interim Senior Minister at the Riverside Church in New York City.

The church's 75th Diamond Anniversary banquet in 1979 was held at the Biltmore Hotel with Academy Award–winning actor Gregory Peck serving as master of ceremonies. Mayor Tom Bradley presented Jones with a commendation on behalf of the city. NAACP Executive Director Benjamin Hooks was the featured speaker. Other prominent guests included US Congressman Julian Dixon, Rabbi Edgar F. Magnin of Wilshire Boulevard Temple, and Dr. H. Claude Hudson, a founder of the Los Angeles NAACP chapter. The anniversary celebration continued through the holiday season. The Pre-Christmas Communion service at Westminster was officiated by noted theologian Dr. Howard Thurman with the assistance of Rev. William Abbot, Rev. Dr. H. Garnett Lee, Dr. Charles Marks, and Jones.

=== Rev. Oliver L. Brown, II ===
Rev. Brown's tenure was marked by inviting others to Westminster to minister in words and music. Brown hosted Dr. Jeremiah Wright, Jr., pastor of the Trinity United Church of Christ in Chicago to an annual week-long revival for eight years, from 1993 through 2000.

== List of pastors ==
Over the years, Westminster Presbyterian Church, Los Angeles has had a number of spiritual leaders, including:

Years	Pastoral charge	Name	Portrait	Notes
1904 – 1908	Minister in charge	Rev. Enos Pomeroy Baker (1856–1911)		White minster with the Church Extension Committee; McCormick Theological Seminary, 1886 graduate. Past president, Presbyterian College of the Southwest, Del Norte, CO.
1908 – 1912	Installed	Rev. Robert W. Holman (1854–1931)		Congregation's first installed pastor. Rev. Holman previously pastored Zion Presbyterian Church in Charleston, SC starting in 1884. In 1964, the church merged with Olivet Presbyterian Church to become Zion Olivet Presbyterian Church.
1912 – 1959	Installed	Rev. Hampton B. Hawes (1888–1976)		Longest serving pastor. His mother had been an enslaved person. Father of jazz pianist Hampton Hawes.
1959 – 1985	Installed	Rev. Dr. James E. Jones (1916–1998)		Lincoln University Theological Seminary and Union Theological Seminary graduate. Dr. James Edward Jones Primary Center(elementary school) opened in 2008.
1960 – 1962	Fraternal Associate Pastor	Rev. Zacharias Bravo (1918–1962)		Bravo was one of the first pastors sent by the Presbyterian church in Brazil to serve in the US. From Bauru, Sãn Paulo, Bravo was to serve two years at Westminster. He was the author of But You Shall Receive the Power. Following a July 1962 meeting in Fresno, California with evangelist Billy Graham about an upcoming Brazil crusade, Bravo drowned in a private pool.
1966 – 1973	Associate Pastor	Rev. Dr. Warren Lee		Lee, a Los Angeles born Korean, was ordained and installed at Westminster as minister of Christian Education. He later became associate director of the San Francisco Theological Seminary Advance Pastoral Studies program in 1981 and retired in 2008 as the program's director.
1972	Assistant Pastor	Rev. William Brimberry Abbot (1923–1997)		Graduate of Princeton Theological Seminary (BDiv)
1980 – 1983	Parish Associate	Rev. Arthur C. Ross, Jr. (1949–2022)		Later pastor of Bel-Vue Community United Presbyterian Church (Los Angeles)
1984 - unknown	Parish Associate	Rev. John F. Warner (1946–2010)		Graduate of Union Theological Seminary (M.Div). Later pastor of Crerar Memorial Presbyterian Church (Chicago, Illinois) from 1993 to 2010.
1986 – 1988	Supply Pastor	Rev. William Brimberry Abbot (1923–1997)		Rev. Abbot returned to Westminster.
1988 – 2001	Installed	Rev. Oliver L. Brown, II (1941–2006)		Westminster's fourth pastor was installed on October 2, 1988. Later founding pastor of First African Presbyterian Church in America (Los Angeles) One of Brown's sons, Olujimi Brown of Atlanta, followed him into ministry.
1990 - 1995	Associate Pastor	Rev. David M. Morris (1946–2009)		As a child, Morris spent his first twelve years attending Westminster. He was also a grandson of Rev. H.B. Hawes, Sr. and graduate of the American Baptist Seminary of the West (M.Div).
2001 – 2005	Interim Pastor	Rev. Glenn L. Jones		Presided at the opening of the Dr. Charles H. Moore Westminster Arms Senior Housing complex in 2004. Jones is also a music composer and director.
2006 – 2011	Installed Designated	Rev. Virginia M. Brown		The church's first female pastor. Graduate of Pittsburgh Theological Seminary (M.Div.)
2011 – 2014	Interim Pastor	Rev. Dr. Charles Marks		Graduate of Pittsburgh Theological Seminary (M.Div.) and San Francisco Theological Seminary (D.Min.) The 2009 film The Least Among You, starring Cedric Sanders and Louis Gossett Jr., was inspired by Rev. Marks.
2014 – Present	Installed	Rev. Carlton A. Rhoden		American Baptist Seminary of the West, 2005 graduate.

== Historic-Cultural Monument ==
The current Westminster Presbyterian Church building was originally constructed for St. Paul's Presbyterian Church for about $60,000. According to Southwest Builder and Contractor magazine, architect Scott Quentin designed a building with a "basement banquet room, social hall, auditorium to seat 600 people and Sunday School rooms to accommodate 800 pupils." Atop the church building's tower is a twelve-foot revolving, lighted cross.

The stained glass windows in the church's sanctuary were crafted by Judson of Los Angeles and the church's organ and chimes were built by the Artcraft Company. The church building also included a full kitchen, special stage, and dressing rooms in the Fellowship Hall. Kitchenettes were also built on each floor. An illuminated playground and Boy Scout Club were built on the church's roof.

Financing for St. Paul's came through a $40,000 loan from the Bank of America and Los Angeles bar owner and crime boss Charles H. Crawford. In June 1930, shortly after an indictment on bribery charges, Crawford was baptized and admitted into the membership of St. Paul's Presbyterian Church. The pastor at St. Paul's was Rev. Gustav A. Briegleb, the noted minister portrayed by John Malkovich in the 2008 film Changeling. On the day of his baptism, Crawford placed a ring set with two large diamonds, and valued at $3,500, in the collection plate at Briegleb's church. Accompanying the ring was a note from Crawford asking Briegleb to sell the ring and use the proceeds to help build a parish house. In November 1930, Crawford made a further gift of $25,000 to be used in building a parish hall to be named Amelia Crawford House in honor of his mother.

The Westminster Presbyterian Church building on Jefferson Boulevard was granted City of Los Angeles Historic-Cultural Monument status (No. 229) on 11 June 1980 recognizing the importance of the building to Los Angeles, California or national history.

== In popular culture ==
- Mariah Carey recorded and filmed O Holy Night live at Westminster Presbyterian Church for her 2010 CD, Merry Christmas II You.
- Norma Williams, interior designer and daughter of noted architect Paul R. Williams, and Frank Harvey Jr., married at Westminster Presbyterian Church on August 26, 1952. Rev. Hampton Hawes presided. More than 1,000 people attended, overflowing into the streets, according to news reports.
- On Sunday, March 14, 1931 California Eagle publisher Charlotta Bass, believed to be the first African-American woman to own and operate a newspaper in the US, was the main speaker for the Women's Day program at Westminster Presbyterian Church.

== Presbyterian churches in Los Angeles ==
Within the Presbytery of the Pacific, there are eight primarily African American Presbyterian congregations. These are: Angeles Mesa Presbyterian Church, Bel-Vue Community Presbyterian Church, Church of the Redeemer Presbyterian Church, Community United Presbyterian Church, First Presbyterian Church of Inglewood, First Presbyterian Church of Los Angeles, St. Paul's Presbyterian Church, and Westminster Presbyterian Church.

== See also ==
- Presbyterian Church (USA)
- List of Presbyterian churches in the United States
- Historic-Cultural Monuments in South Los Angeles
