= Broadway-Manchester, Los Angeles =

Broadway-Manchester
- Neighborhood of Los Angeles
- Location within southern Los Angeles
- Coordinates: 33°56′30″N 118°16′30″W
- Country: United States
- State: California
- County: Los Angeles
- City: Los Angeles

Broadway-Manchester is a 1.5-square-mile neighborhood in Los Angeles, California. The neighborhood, part of the South Los Angeles area, is home to over 23,000 residents.

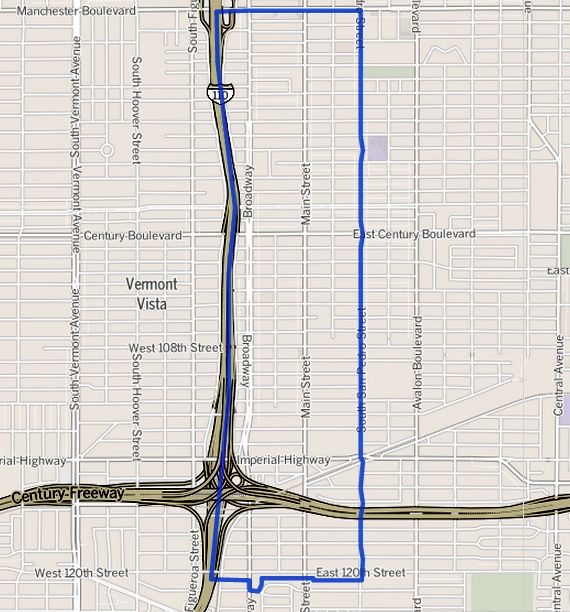
Broadway-Manchester district of the city of Los Angeles, as drawn by the Los Angeles Times

== Geography ==
The Broadway-Manchester neighborhood touches Florence on the north, Green Meadows on the east, Vermont Knolls and Willowbrook on the south and Vermont Vista on the west. It is bounded by Manchester Boulevard on the north, San Pedro Street on the east, the Los Angeles City boundary on the south and Interstate 110 on the west.

== History ==
The neighborhood was the site of the Broadway & 87th Street shopping center, designed by Wisstein Bros. & Surval, constructed in stages between 1936 and 1939 on South Broadway between 87th and 88th streets. It was notable at the time for the number of anchor stores: a Mayfair's Foodtown supermarket (a new type of store at that time), two drugstores: Thrifty Drug Stores and Owl Rexall Drugs, and two variety stores: Woolworth's and Newberry's. There was a shared parking lot for 280 cars at the back of the stores, about equal to the size of the stores, a novelty at that time.

== Population ==
A total of 23,471 residents lived in Broadway-Manchester's 1.5 square miles, according to the 2000 U.S. census — averaging 15,060 people per square mile, among the highest population densities in both the city and the county.

The median age was 23, young for the city and the county, and the percentages of residents younger than age 18 were among the county's highest. There were 1,335 families headed by single parents; the rate of 27.9% was considered high for both the city and the county.

Broadway-Manchester was considered "moderately diverse" in 2000, the proportions of Latino and African Americans being 58.6% and 39.3%, respectively. Other ethnicities were white, 1%; Asian, 0.4%; and other, 0.7%. Mexico and El Salvador were the most common places of birth for the 35% of the residents who were born abroad, about an average percentage for the city as a whole.

The median household income in 2008 dollars was $29,897, considered low for both the city and county. The percentage of households earning $20,000 or less was high, compared to the county at large. The average household size of 3.7 people was also considered high. Renters occupied 63.1% of the housing units, and homeowners occupied the rest.

== Education ==
Only 3.9% of Broadway-Manchester residents held a four-year degree, a low percentage for both the city and the county. The percentage of residents age 25 and older with less than a high school diploma was high for the county.

Within the Broadway-Manchester neighborhood are found:

- Alliance Heritage College-Ready Academy High School (LAUSD)
- Watts Learning Center Charter Middle School (LAUSD)
- Samuel Gompers Middle School (LAUSD)
- One Hundred Seventh Street Elementary School (LAUSD)
- Mother of Sorrows Elementary School (private)
- Sheenway School and Culture Center (private)

Dr. Owen L. Knox Elementary (LAUSD)

== Hospitals ==
- Broadway Community Hospital (former, closed 1982)

== See also ==
- List of districts and neighborhoods of Los Angeles
