= Broadway Community Hospital =

Geography
- Location: 9500 South Broadway, Los Angeles, California, United States
- Coordinates: 33.950194°N 118.277681°W

Organization
- Type: General

Services
- Beds: 56

History
- Closed: March 19, 1982

Links
- Lists: Hospitals in California

Broadway Community Hospital was a 56-bed hospital located at 9500 South Broadway, in the Broadway-Manchester district of Los Angeles, California.

The hospital was abruptly closed by its staff (and its 17 patients transferred elsewhere quietly) on Friday March 19, 1982. The next day, state and county health authorities arrived to shut the hospital down, only to find that it had already been locked down and emptied. The hospital was served with a 61-page complaint for what was alleged "a threat to the public health" by health officials, amid specific cases of what was deemed unacceptable and improper patient care.
