= Broadway & 87th Street shopping center =

Shopping center in Los Angeles, California, United States

Coordinates: 33°57′29″N 118°16′43″W

The Broadway & 87th Street shopping center designed by Wisstein Bros. and Surval, was one of the earliest shopping centers in Los Angeles, built in stages between 1936 and 1939 at 8701–8765 South Broadway between 87th and 88th streets, in what is now termed the Broadway-Manchester neighborhood. Researcher and author Richard Longstreth calls it the first true neighborhood shopping center.

== Anchors ==
It was notable at the time for the high number of anchor stores: a Mayfair's Foodtown supermarket (a new type of store at that time), two drugstores: Thrifty Drug Stores and Owl Rexall Drugs, and two variety stores: Woolworth's and Newberry's.

== Integrity ==
Stores each had separate façades facing the streets; there was no uniform look for the shopping center as a unit. The street-facing side of the shops was used for display windows; there were no displays facing the parking lot in back, reflecting the perception of parking lots at that time as utilitarian.

== Parking innovation ==
There was regular street parking in front, and storefronts were flush with the sidewalk. however, there was a shared parking lot for 280 cars at the back of the stores, about equal in size of the combined size of the stores, also a novelty at that time. The northernmost buildings are in use as an indoor swap meet (bazaar). The property at 8701 South Broadway was sold on September 15, 2020, for $2.03 million. The shopping center closed in 2020. By March 2021, the property was being marketed as the "Former South Los Angeles swap meet", indicating that its operation as an indoor swap meet had ceased by that time.
