= Peck Park =

Public park in Los Angeles, USA

- Interactive map of Peck Park
- Location: 560 Western Ave
- Nearest city: San Pedro, California
- Coordinates: 33°45′00″N 118°18′18″W
- Operator: City of Los Angeles Department of Recreation and Parks

Peck Park is a public park located in the San Pedro district of Los Angeles, California. The park's address is 560 Western Avenue, near the intersection with Summerland Avenue. Peck Park is managed by the City of Los Angeles Department of Recreation and Parks. Facilities at the park include a swimming pool, a baseball diamond, indoor and outdoor basketball courts, extensive hiking trails, and a child care center. In 1997 the Peck Park gymnasium was designed by Koning Eizenberg Architecture, Inc. The park is the largest of four in San Pedro named for notable land owner and developer George H. Peck and his family; Peck began to donate the land to the city for the park starting in 1929. The other three parks are named after his three children (Rena, Alma, and Leland).

== Shooting ==
Two people were killed and seven injured on Sunday, July 24, 2022.

== See also ==
- List of parks in Los Angeles
