= Vermont Vista, Los Angeles =

Vermont Vista
- Neighborhood of Los Angeles
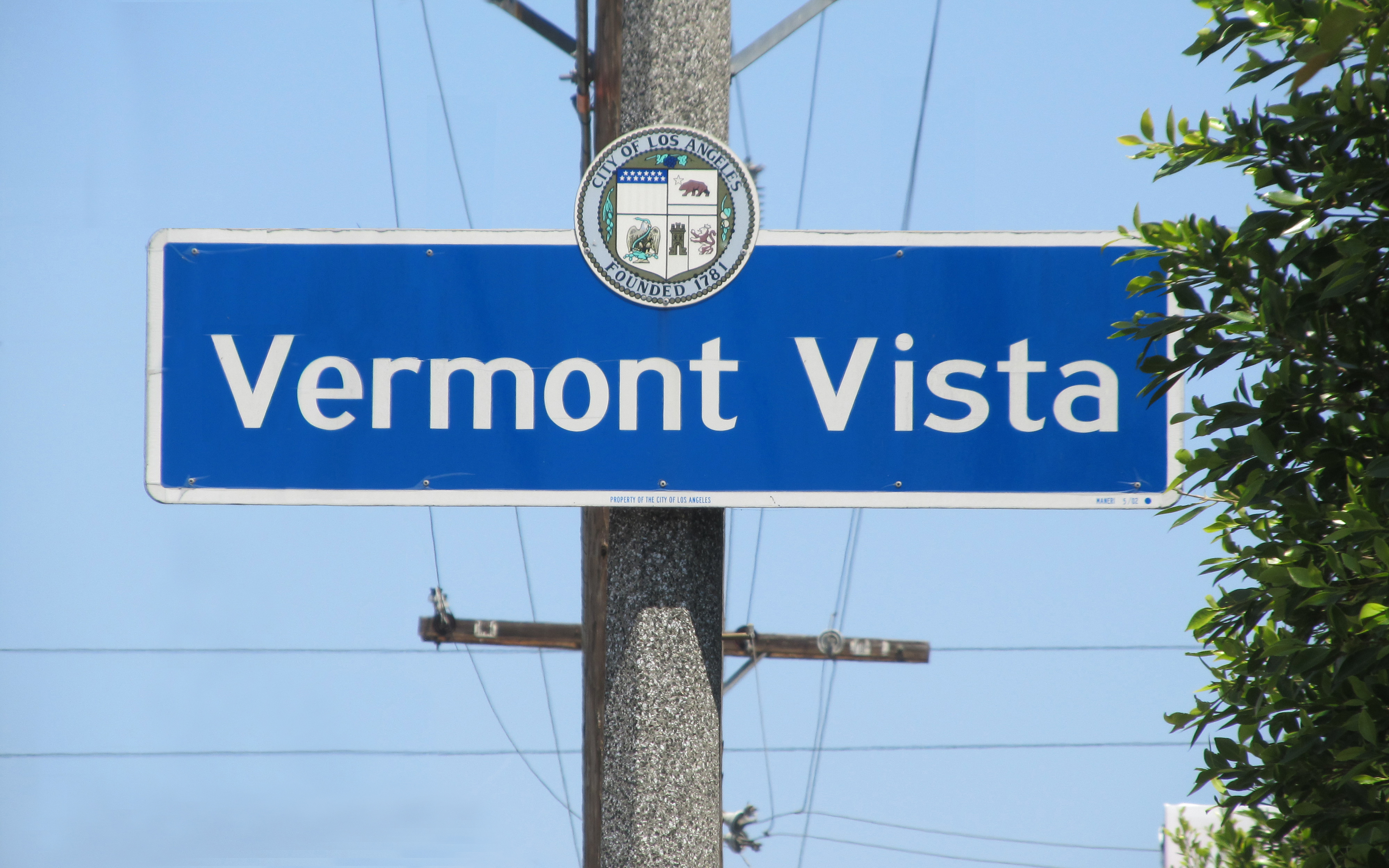
- Vermont Vista neighborhood sign located on Vermont Avenue between 99th Street and Century Boulevard

- Location within Los Angeles
- Coordinates: 33°57′36″N 118°17′45″W
- Country: United States
- State: California
- County: Los Angeles
- City: Los Angeles
- Time zone: Pacific
- ZIP Code: 90061
- Area code: 323

Vermont Vista is a neighborhood in Los Angeles, California, within the South Los Angeles area.

== History ==
=== Early history ===
In the late 1880's the Los Angeles and Redondo Railway erected a station on the modern intersection of Vermont Ave. and Century Blvd. which became known as the Sunnyside Division

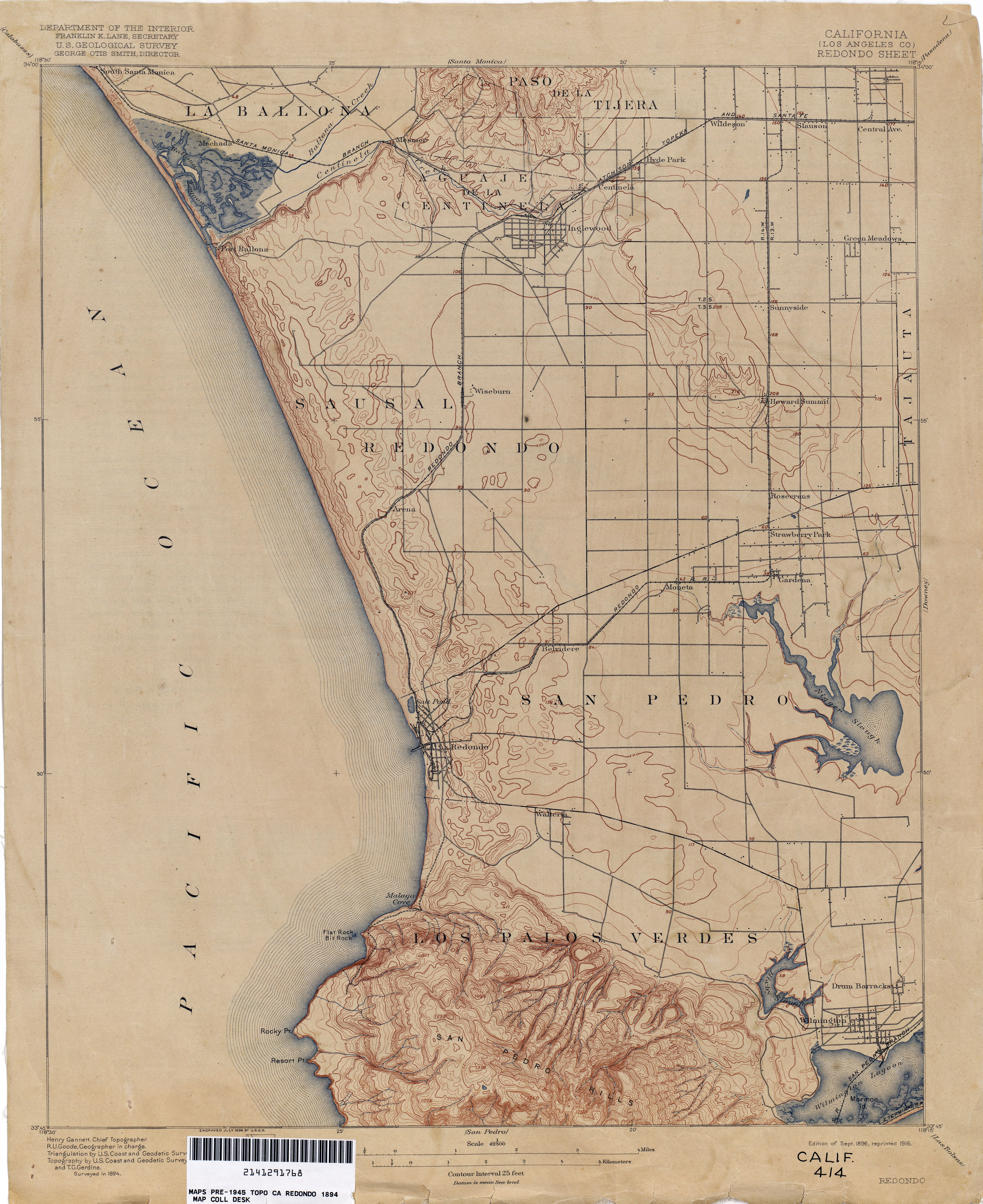
1894 Map. Sunnyside (Vermont & Century) is visible in the middle right of the map

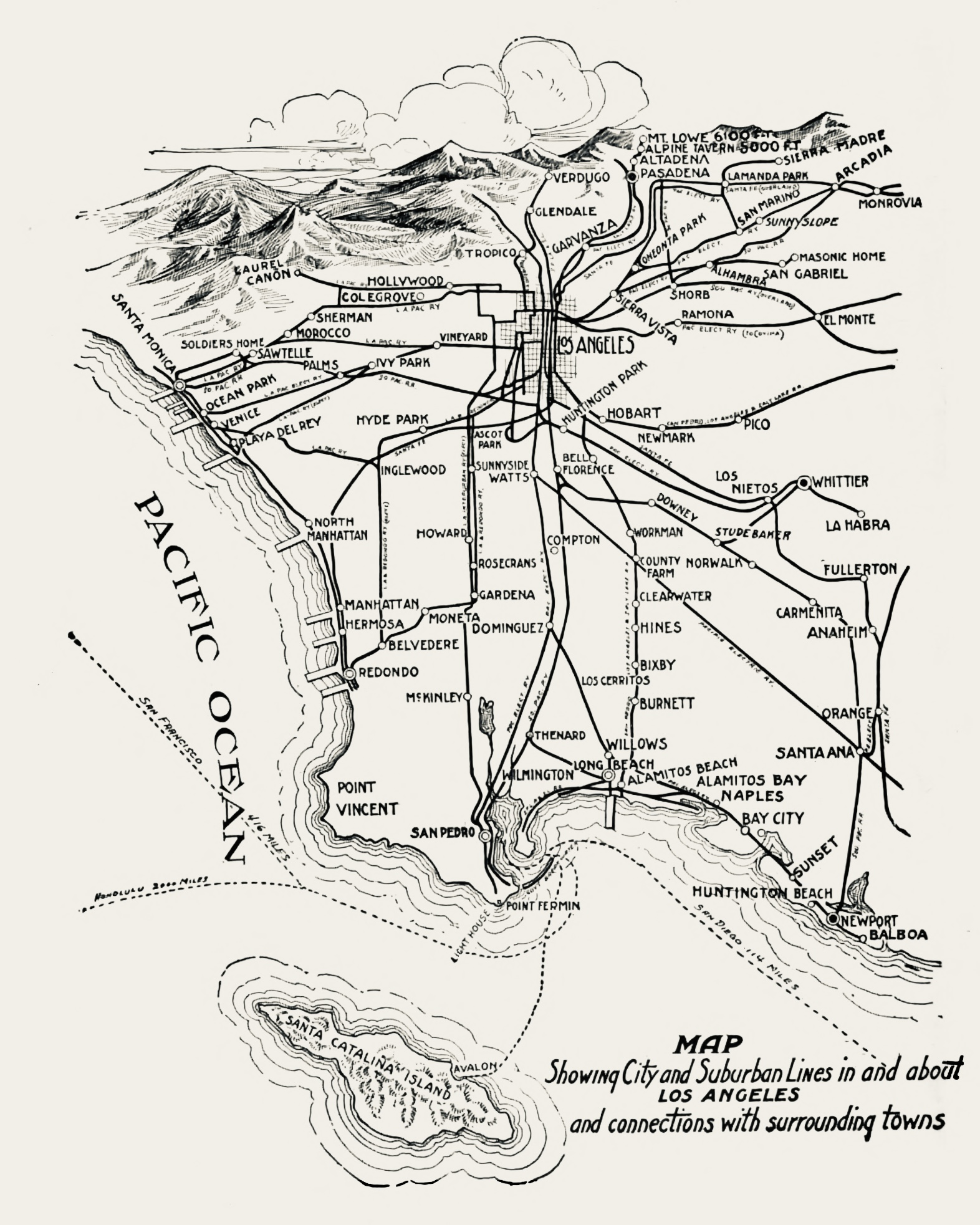
1912 Railroad Map. Sunnyside Station is Shown on the map

In 1920 after a railroad merger, the F Line of the Los Angeles Railway ran a streetcar service down Vermont Avenue to Delta Station on Imperial Ave.

=== Modern History ===
Beginning in 2000, the Eighth District Empowerment Congress began working on the "Naming Neighborhoods Project" to identify and name individual communities that had historically been grouped together and regarded as part of South Central Los Angeles.

The first focus group was held at Hebrew Union College in June 2000. Through research, a meeting with an urban historian, and numerous community meetings, the Empowerment Congress ultimately outlined sixteen unique neighborhoods, including the neighborhood of Vermont Vista. The names were submitted to City Council in October 2001 and approved in February 2002.

== Geography ==
By city council action (C.F. #01-1874), "Vermont Vista" was officially named and designated as being bounded by the following streets: West Manchester Boulevard on the north, South Vermont Avenue on the west, the Harbor Freeway (I-110) on the east, and 99th Street on the south. The motion was made as part of the Eighth District Empowerment Congress's "Naming Neighborhoods Project" to identify and name individual communities that had historically been grouped together and regarded as part of South Central.

The Department of Transportation was instructed to install signage at the following intersections: Northbound Vermont Avenue at 99th Street, Northbound Figueroa Street at 99th Street Southbound Hoover Street at 87th Street and Eastbound Manchester Avenue at Menlo Avenue.

The neighborhood of Magnolia Square, which was officially designated at the same time, is on the south.

The Los Angeles Times Mapping L.A. project, which defines neighborhoods by merging together neighboring census tracts, combines the above-designated neighborhood of Vermont Vista with the neighborhood of Magnolia Square. Per the Los Angeles Times, Vermont Vista is bounded by Manchester Boulevard on the north, Vermont Avenue on the west, the Harbor Freeway on the east, and West 120th Street on the south. It is bordered by Vermont Knolls on the north, Broadway-Manchester on the east, Gardena on the south, and Athens and Westmont on the west.

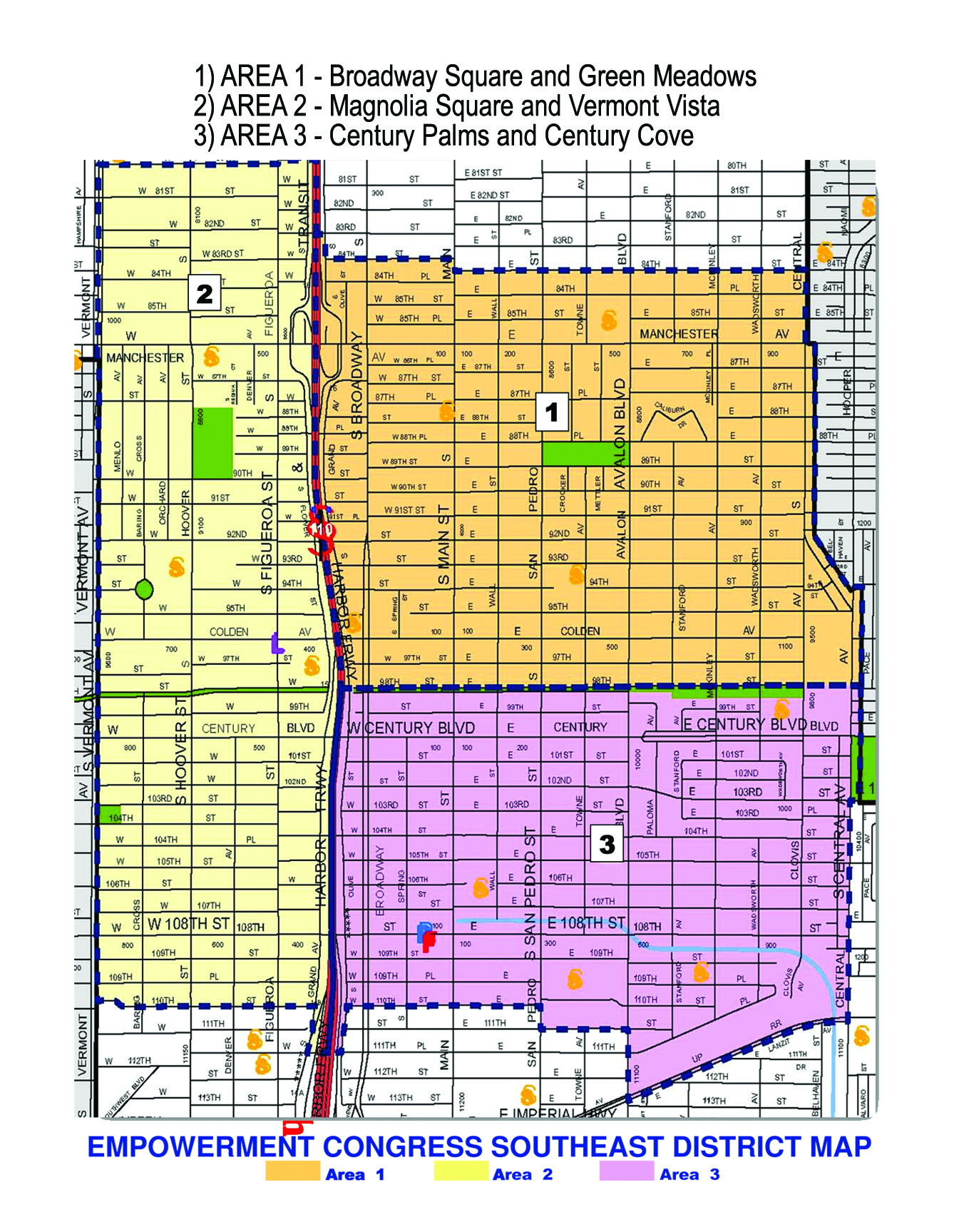
Vermont Vista as outlined by the Empowerment Congress Southeast Neighborhood Council

== Demographics ==
The following data from the Los Angeles Times Mapping L.A. project covers the combined city-designated neighborhoods of Vermont Vista and Magnolia Square:

A total of 23,291 people lived in the area's 1.65 square miles, according to the 2000 U.S. census—averaging 14,154 people per square mile, among the highest population densities in the city as a whole. Population was estimated at 24,891 in 2008. The median age was 24, considered young when compared to the city as a whole. The percentages of residents aged birth to 18 were among the county's highest.

Latinos made up 52.1% of the population, with black people at 45%, white 1.1%, Asian 0.8%, and other 1%. Mexico and El Salvador were the most common places of birth for the 31.3% of the residents who were born abroad, an average percentage of foreign-born when compared with the city or county as a whole.

The $31,272 median household income in 2008 dollars was considered low for the city and county. The percentage of households earning $20,000 or less was high, compared to the county at large. The average household size of 3.5 people was high for the city. Renters occupied 59.6% of the housing units, and homeowners occupied the rest.

In 2000 there were 1,419 families headed by single parents, or 28.2%, a rate that was high for the county and the city. The percentages of never-married women (41.7) and never-married men (37.9) were among the county's highest.

Just 6% of residents aged 25 and older had completed a four-year degree in 2000, which was a low figure when compared with the city and the county at large; the percentage of those residents with less than a high school diploma was high for the county.

== Development ==
In 2020, a $33.7 million mixed-use development opened at 88th Street and Vermont.

The project, built on city-owned property, was among the first affordable housing developments funded by Measure HHH.

== Education ==
The schools within the official Vermont Vista boundaries are:

- Bret Harte Preparatory Middle School, LAUSD, 9301 South Hoover Street
- Danny J. Bakewell Sr. Primary Center, LAUSD elementary, 8621 South Baring Cross Street
- Youth Opportunities Unlimited, LAUSD alternative, 915 West Manchester Avenue
- Manchester Avenue Elementary School, LAUSD, 661 West 87th Street
- Charles W. Barrett Elementary School, LAUSD, 419 West 98th Street

The following schools are south of 99th Street, outside the official boundaries of Vermont Vista, and in the neighborhood of Magnolia Square. However, they are within the boundaries set by the Los Angeles Times Mapping LA project:

- Figueroa Street Elementary School, LAUSD, 510 West 111th Street
- Washington Primary Center, LAUSD, 860 West 112th Street

== Government ==
Vermont Vista lies within Los Angeles City Council District 8.

The following government services are located within the boundaries of Vermont Vista:

- Mark Twain Branch Library, Los Angeles Public Library - 9621 S. Figueroa Street
- Hancock Post Office, USPS - 8200 South Vermont Avenue

== Parks and recreation ==
- Algin Sutton Recreation Center, 8800 South Hoover Street

== See also ==
- Harbor Freeway station
- Vermont/Athens station
