= Vermont Knolls, Los Angeles =

Vermont Knolls
- Neighborhood of Los Angeles
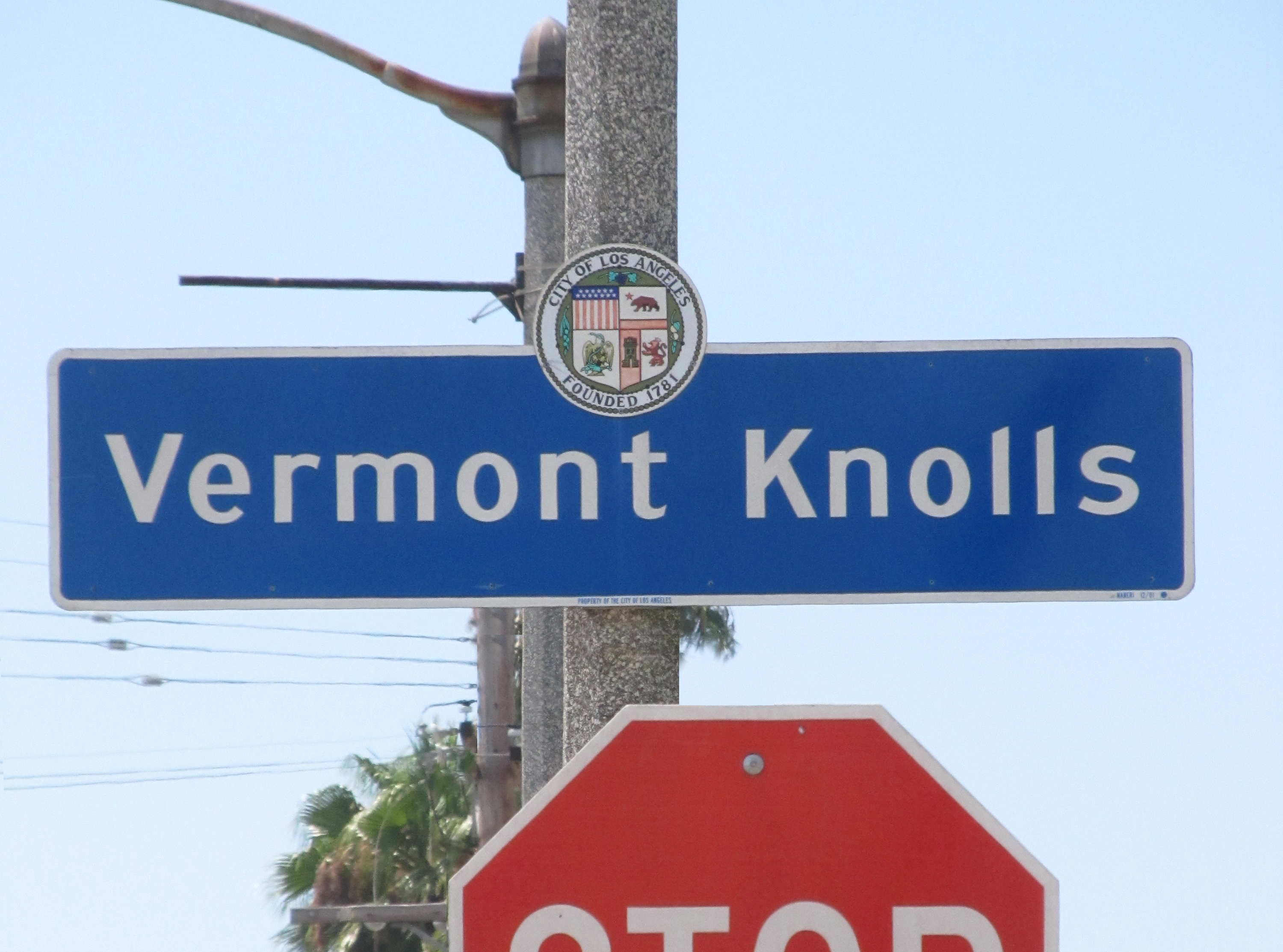
- Vermont Knolls city signage at Vermont Avenue and 77th Street

- Location within Central Los Angeles
- Coordinates: 33°58′13″N 118°17′30″W
- Country: United States
- State: California
- County: Los Angeles
- Time zone: Pacific
- Zip Code: 90044
- Area code: 323

Vermont Knolls is a neighborhood in Los Angeles, California, within the South Los Angeles region.

== Geography ==
Vermont Knolls a 1.14-square-mile (3.0 km^{2}) neighborhood. The neighborhood is bounded by Florence Avenue on the north, the 110 Freeway on the east, Manchester Boulevard or the Los Angeles city limits on the south and Normandie Avenue on the west.

It is bordered by Vermont-Slauson on the north, South Park and Florence on the east, Vermont Vista and Westmont on the south and Manchester Square on the west.

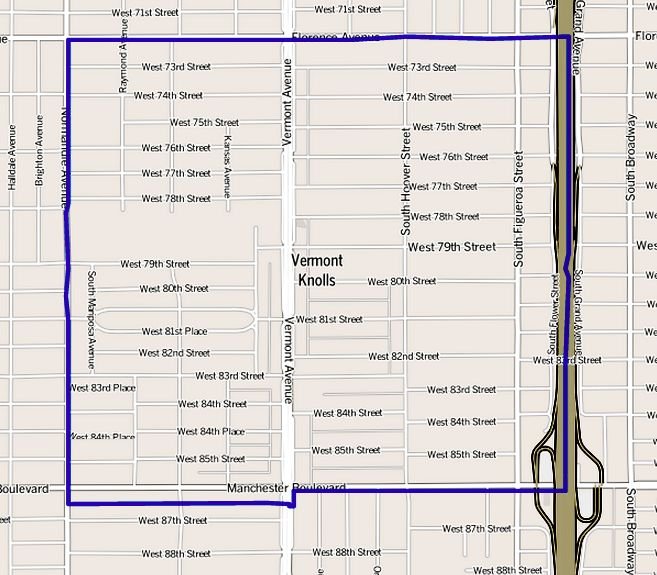
Vermont Knolls neighborhood as outlined by the Los Angeles Times

== History ==
Vermont Knolls is a subdivision of single- and multi-family homes that was initially planned by the Walter H. Leimert Company. The company subdivided it in 1928, originally calling it the Vermont Avenue Knoll, and promoted it in conjunction with Leimert Park, a larger-scale subdivision to the northwest. The subdivision was marketed as a low-price, middle-class neighborhood.

=== Pepperdine University ===
In February 1937, George Pepperdine founded Pepperdine University as a Christian liberal arts college in the Vermont Knolls neighborhood of Los Angeles. On September 21, 1937, 167 new students from 22 different states and two other countries entered classes on a newly built campus on 34 acres at West 79th Street and South Vermont Avenue.

Pepperdine University moved to a new and larger campus in Malibu, California, in September 1972. The old campus was sold to the Crenshaw Christian Center, whose minister, Frederick K.C. Price, then oversaw construction of the "FaithDome", a $9 million geodesic structure with seating for 10,145 worshipers. When it opened in 1989, it was the largest church in the nation.

=== Economic redevelopment ===
In the wake of the 1992 Los Angeles riots, the 165-acre Vermont/Manchester Recovery Redevelopment Project was adopted by CRA/LA on May 14, 1996. The project area included Vermont Avenue between 79th and 89th streets.

=== Vermont Shopping Center ===
In 1999, "Designs for Development Guidelines" were adopted for a proposed 100,000-square-foot mixed-use shopping center. The "Vermont Entertainment Village" at Vermont and Manchester Avenues officially broke ground in April 2015. A year later, development had not progressed.

== Demographics ==
A total of 20,616 people lived in Vermont Knolls' 1.14 square miles, according to the 2000 U.S. census—averaging 18,057 people per square mile, among the highest population densities in the city as a whole. Population was estimated at 21,568 in 2008. The median age was 24, considered young when compared to the city as a whole. The percentages of residents aged birth to 18 were among the county's highest.

Within the neighborhood, Latinos made up 54.5% of the population, with black people at 42.6%, Asian 1.2%, white 1% and other 0.7%. Mexico and El Salvador were the most common places of birth for the 33.2% of the residents who were born abroad, an average percentage of foreign-born when compared with the city or county as a whole.

The $27,730 median household income in 2008 dollars was considered low for the city and county. The percentage of households earning $20,000 or less was high, compared to the county at large. The average household size of 3.3 people was high for the city. Renters occupied 72.1% of the housing units, and homeowners occupied the rest.

In 2000 there were 1,533 families headed by single parents, or 33.7%, the second-highest rate for any city neighborhood, after Watts.

Vermont Knolls' residents with a four-year bachelor's degree amounted to 5.4% of the population aged 25 and older in 2000, which was a low figure when compared with the city and the county at large; the percentage of those residents with less than a high school diploma was high for the county.

== Government ==
Los Angeles Fire Department Station 46 is in Vermont Knolls.

== Education ==
There are three schools within the Vermont Knolls boundaries.

- Raymond Avenue Elementary School, LAUSD, 7511 Raymond Avenue
- Loren Miller Elementary, LAUSD, 830 West 77th Street
- Youth Opportunities Unlimited, LAUSD alternative, 915 West Manchester Avenue

== Notable residents ==
- Joel Wachs (born 1939)— City Council (1970–2001), president of the Andy Warhol Foundation for the Visual Arts in New York City.
- Maxine Waters, City Council member
