= Monterey Hills, Los Angeles =

Monterey Hills
- Neighborhood of Los Angeles
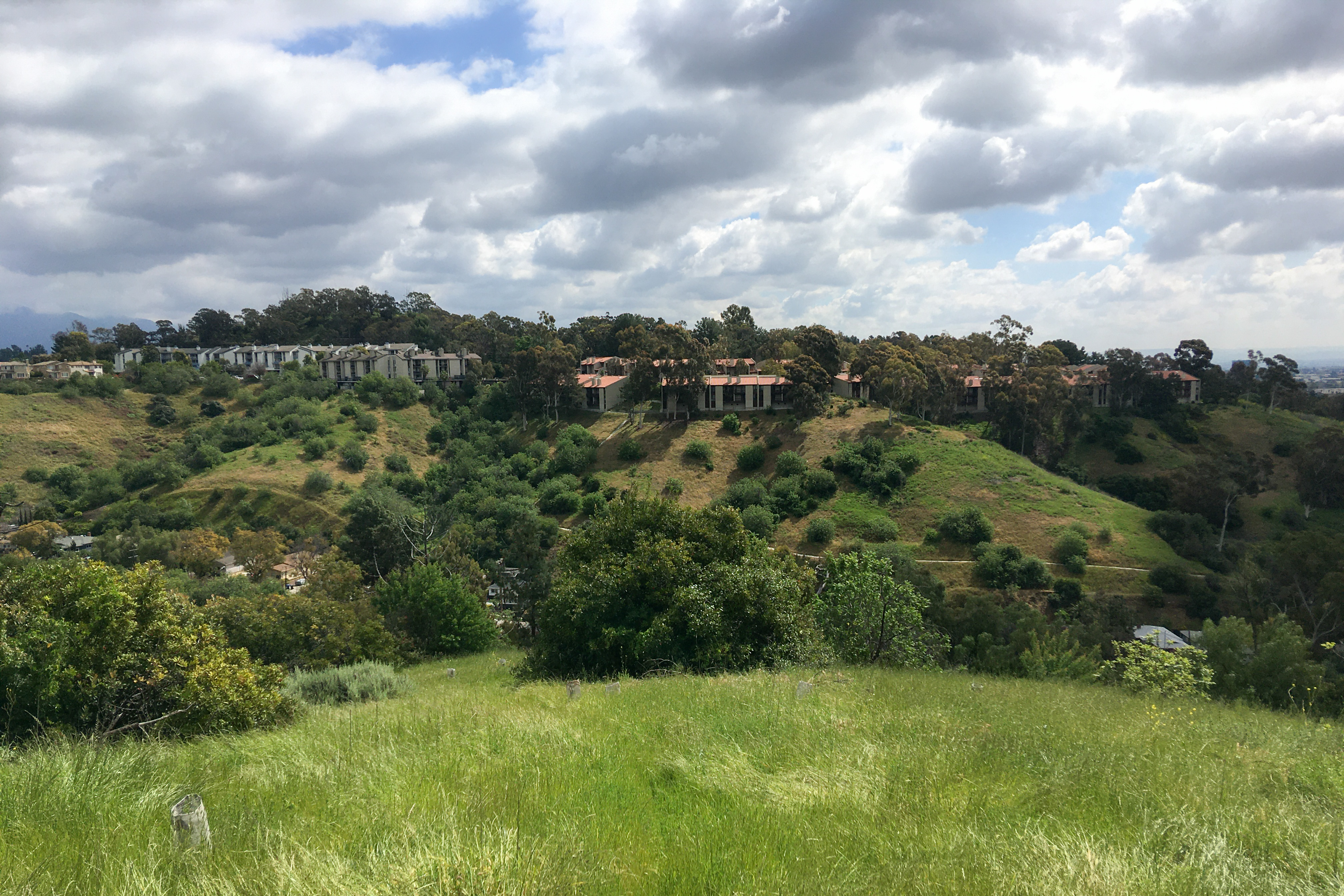
- Monterey Hills neighborhood

- Location within Central Los Angeles
- Coordinates: 34°6′0″N 118°11′0″W
- Country: United States
- State: California
- County: Los Angeles
- City: Los Angeles
- Time zone: UTC-8 (PST)
  - Summer (DST): UTC-7 (PDT)
- Website: www.montereyhills.org

Monterey Hills is a neighborhood in Los Angeles, California.

== Development history ==
The Monterey Hills Redevelopment Project, adopted by City Council on July 29, 1971, includes the development of a well planned residential community that provides a variety of housing opportunities for families and individuals from all income levels and the preservation of the physical integrity of the site. Twenty-one condominium and rental complexes totaling 1,781 units have been built in the project area. In the late 1980s, some developments experienced varying degrees of soil settlement, and certain buildings showed signs of structural distress.

From 1989-1990 The Monterey Hills Development on whole was the subject of the longest civil jury trial in Los Angeles County History due to land subsidence. The Castro firm sued the massive 200-unit Eaton Crest project in Monterey Hills, a structure that was constructed on an unstable 100-foot-deep (30 m) backfill. The Los Angeles Times reported that the $62,500,000 award was one of the largest settlements to ever involve the city.

Lawsuits filed by homeowner associations against the Agency and others resulted in a Global Settlement Agreement in 1991. Necessary soil, structural and cosmetic repairs are now the responsibility of individual homeowner associations to be paid by the Global Settlement Fund. Subsequent to the Global Settlement, one additional project, the 16-unit Bradley Court Condominiums, has been completed.

Despite its rocky past, the Monterey Hills neighborhood has enjoyed steadily rising property values, thanks in large part to Southern California's Real Estate boom circa 2001–2005. Most, if not all, of the severe structural subsidence issues that previously afflicted almost all of the associations built in the area have since been remedied and continue to be updated and maintained from funds still held in trust from the Global Settlement fund.

== Geography ==
The neighborhood is located about 4 miles ENE of Downtown Los Angeles and about 3 miles from Pasadena off the 110 Freeway. It is surrounded by El Sereno to the southeast, Hermon to the north, Montecito Heights to the southwest and South Pasadena to the northeast. Monterey Hills is part of the Arroyo Seco Neighborhood Council (ASNC).

== Events ==
- Monterey Hills Jazz Festival - an annual event co-sponsored by the Monterey Hills Federation and the Cultural Affairs department of the city. Approximately 1,200 to 1,500 people attend.

== Community Organizations ==
The Monterey Hills Federation which was formed by the dues-paying member Home Owner Associations (HOAs) to represent the interests of Monterey Hills with the city, county, and state. The Monterey Hills Federation was instrumental in bringing a private security company in, POST Patrol, to provide nightly patrols of the community and participating HOAs. When the Bradley Court complex was in planning stages, the Monterey Hills Federation advocated strongly against another large complex and was able to get the complex built at the current number of 16 units as opposed to the initial 100+ units. Initial plans were to place a 7-11 type convenience store at the top of the Hill but the Monterey Hills Federation successfully advocated for a park instead. Budd Wiener Park stands in the center of Monterey Hills and serves as a central gathering place for the residents and hosts the annual Monterey Hills Jazz Festival, Movies in the Park, and various Monterey Hills Fairs. The Monterey Hills Federation has sponsored The View and The Monterey Hills Outlook community news letters.

The Arroyo Seco Neighborhood Council Monterey Hills Local Issues Committee was stood up as an official body of the ASNC to relay back community feedback to the neighborhood council. Traditionally, most of the members of the local issues committee have also been members of the Monterey Hills Federation.

Both organizations meet monthly on the 2nd Thursday of the month at the Marshall Villas Recreation Room. The Local Issues Meeting meets at 7pm and the Federation meets at 8pm. These meetings are usually attended by the LA City Council District 14 field deputy, LAPD Senior Lead Officer, and Post Patrol who all make reports and answer community concerns.

As of 2015, the Monterey Hills Federation is sponsoring a Community Emergency Response Team (CERT) for building awareness and emergency preparedness in Monterey Hills.

== Parks and recreation ==
- Budd Wiener Park - Via Marisol between Via Colina & Via Arbolada.
