= Crenshaw Christian Center =

Coordinates: 33°58′5″N 118°17′43″W

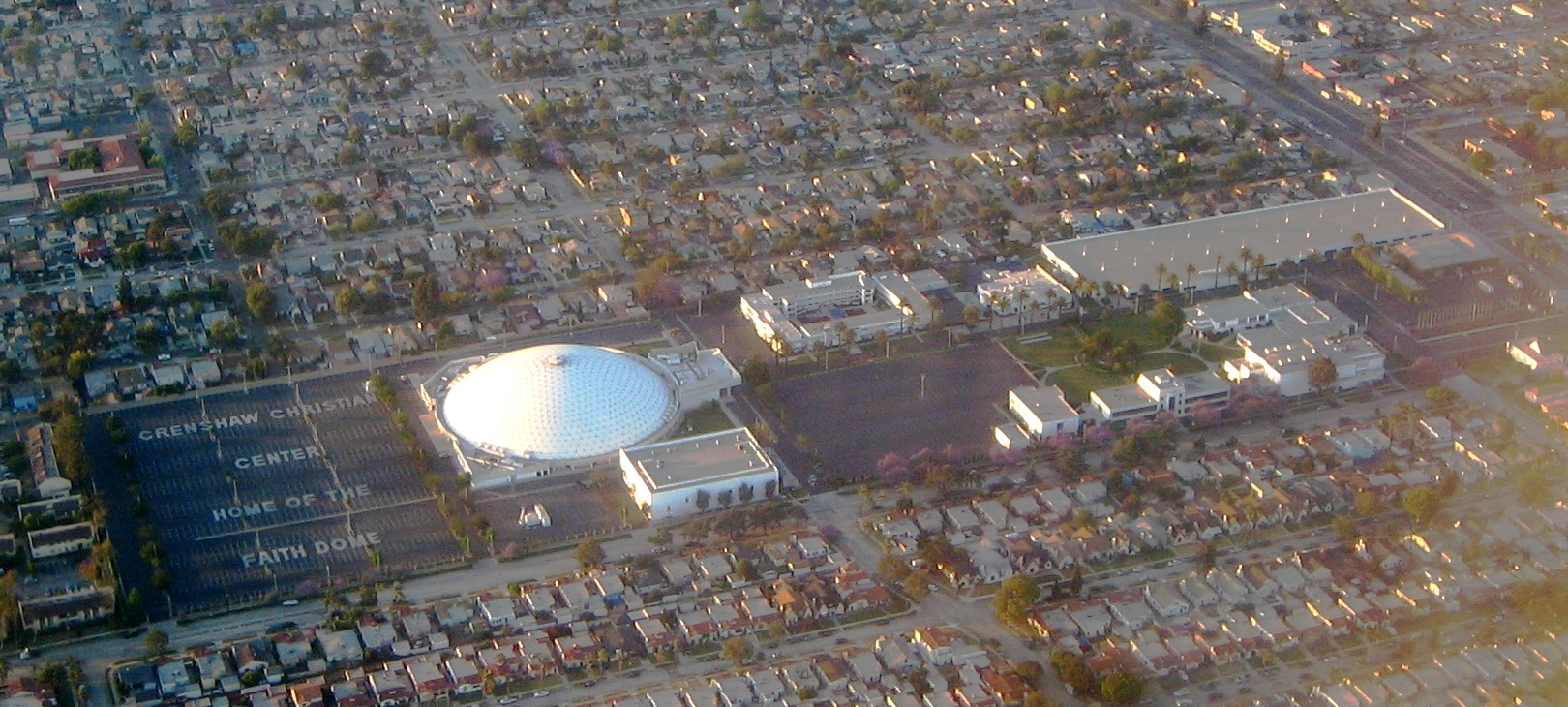
- Crenshaw Christian Center campus
- Crenshaw Christian Center
- Location: Vermont Knolls, Los Angeles
- Country: United States
- Denomination: Non-denominational, Charismatic
- Website: Official site

History
- Founded: 1973
- Founder: Frederick K. C. Price

Specifications
- Capacity: 10,145

The Crenshaw Christian Center is a non-denominational megachurch based in Los Angeles, California. It has around 28,000 members.

== History ==
The church was founded in 1973 by Frederick K. C. Price in Inglewood, California.

In 1981, the church bought the old Pepperdine University campus in South Los Angeles. After the purchase, Price oversaw construction of a new sanctuary, called the "FaithDome", which at the time was the largest domed church in the United States. In 1989, the building is inaugurated with 10,145 seats. The church had greatly expanded from the time of its previous location at 9550 Crenshaw Boulevard in Inglewood, California, but still required three services for its growing congregation until the building of the FaithDome.

In 2007, Frederick K.C. Price, who was then pastor, filed a defamation suit after the ABC television network aired a segment of their 20/20 investigative journalism program about certain of the largest, well-known Christian ministries in the U.S. Titled "Enough!", it was about how these ministries appeared to be misspending their congregants' tithes and offerings. It illustrated that Price was one of the ministers who had become overly wealthy as a result of misusing his congregants' monies. To this end, the program broadcast a portion of a Sunday service at Crenshaw Christian Center in which Price, casting himself as a fictional character for the sake of illustration, made statements from his character's point of view about having great riches. 20/20 failed to state the context of those statements, thus allowing them to appear to be statements being made directly by Price himself. ABC later apologized on air and in writing.

In 2009, Fred K. Price, Jr. became the senior pastor. In June 2017, Fred K. Price, Jr. stepped down after eight years as leader of the church, apologizing for "serious personal misjudgments which have affected my life and my family". The church did not disclose the concrete nature of these missteps, and stated that Fred K. Price, Jr. would retake its leadership. He returned to his duties in July 2018.

In 2018, the church had 28,000 members.

== See also ==
- List of the largest evangelical churches
- List of the largest evangelical church auditoriums
