= Cohasset Melba Park =

Urban park in San Fernando Valley, Los Angeles, California

Coordinates: 34.2058°N 118.6355°W

- Interactive map of Cohasset Melba Park
- Type: Urban park
- Location: San Fernando Valley (Los Angeles City Council District 3)
- Nearest city: Los Angeles, California
- Operator: City of Los Angeles Department of Recreation and Parks
- Status: Open

Cohasset Melba Park also known as Four Oaks Park, is an urban park located in the San Fernando Valley, Los Angeles, California. It is primarily a grassy green space, with drinking fountains and a children's playground.
