= Frederick K. C. Price =

American televangelist and author (1932–2021)

- Born: January 3, 1932; Santa Monica, California, U.S.
- Died: February 12, 2021 (aged 89); Torrance, California, U.S.
- Education: Dorsey High School
- Spouse: Betty Scott (m. 1953)
- Children: 5
- Church: Crenshaw Christian Center

Frederick Kenneth Cercie Price (January 3, 1932 – February 12, 2021) was an American televangelist and author who was the founder and pastor of Crenshaw Christian Center (CCC), located in South Los Angeles, California. He was known for his Ever Increasing Faith ministries broadcast, which aired weekly on television and radio.

== Early life ==
Price was born in 1932 in Santa Monica, California, a Los Angeles suburb, the eldest son of Winifred and Frederick Price Sr., who owned a janitorial service in West Los Angeles. Frederick attended McKinley Elementary School in Santa Monica, Foshay Junior High, Manual Arts High School and Dorsey High School in Los Angeles, and received two years of schooling at Los Angeles City College. He later received an honorary diploma from the Rhema Bible Training Center (1976) and an honorary Doctor of Divinity degree from Oral Roberts University (1982).

Both of his parents had once been practicing Jehovah's Witnesses. At the time Price met his future wife Betty, his parents had stopped practicing the religion and were also outspoken against all organized religions. While courting Betty, his high school sweetheart, he began attending church services with her. However, after their marriage, he stopped attending church regularly until a group of Los Angeles-area churches began sponsoring a week of old-fashioned tent revivals in the Crenshaw area. Price began attending these services with his wife. At one of these services, he received Jesus Christ as his personal savior. Soon after becoming born again, Price claimed to have felt the call from God to go into the ministry, serving mostly part-time, while working as a paper cutter, as an assistant pastor in a Baptist church from 1955 to 1957. He then pastored an African Methodist Episcopal church in Val Verde, California from 1957 to 1959. In the early 1960s, Price served at Westminster Presbyterian Church in Los Angeles. Price then joined the Christian and Missionary Alliance at West Washington Community Church in 1965.

== Ministry work ==
In February 1970, Price had received the baptism of the Holy Spirit, and also said he spoke in tongues, a time which he considered the starting point in his own ministry. Shortly thereafter, he encountered the Bible-teaching ministry of late preacher/televangelist Kenneth E. Hagin. Price joined the neo-charismatic movement, affiliating with Word of Faith, and began to teach the messages on speaking in tongues, divine healing, and prosperity teachings. He and his wife Betty co-founded the Crenshaw Christian Center that same year in the Crenshaw section of West Los Angeles, California.

=== Crenshaw Christian Center ===
In November 1973, Price moved with about 300 church members from West Washington in Los Angeles in order to establish the Crenshaw Christian Center in Inglewood, California. Membership continued to grow, and in 1977 the church was forced to hold two services, with another service added in 1982, because the 1,400-seat sanctuary was always filled to capacity. In 1981, the church bought the old Pepperdine University campus. After the purchase, Price oversaw construction of a new sanctuary, called the "FaithDome", which at the time was the largest domed church in the United States.

Ground was broken for the FaithDome on September 28, 1986, and construction began on January 5, 1987. Construction was completed in 1989 on the 10,146-seat dome at a cost of more than $10 million. At the time of its dedication on January 21, 1990, the dome and the church's property were both fully paid for, leaving the ministry debt-free.

=== Christian Word of Faith Ministries ===
In 1990, Price founded the Fellowship of International Christian Word of Faith Ministries (FICWFM), which includes churches and ministers from all over the United States and several other countries. They meet regionally throughout the year and hold a major annual convention. Price was a Word of Faith teacher.

== Personal life ==
Price married the former Betty Ruth Scott, whom he met while attending Dorsey High School, in 1953. They had five children (one child died during childhood). His grandson is professional basketball player Allen Crabbe. Fred Price Jr. succeeded him as pastor of CCC.

=== Death ===
Price died from complications of COVID-19 at a hospital in Los Angeles, on February 12, 2021, at the age of 89.

== Selected books written by Price ==
- Faith, Foolishness, or Presumption?, 160 pages, ISBN 978-0-89274-103-8, ISBN 0-89274-103-1, Publisher: Harrison House, Incorporated, Publication date: January 1, 1981
- How to Obtain Strong Faith: Six Principles, ISBN 978-0-89274-042-0, ISBN 0-89274-042-6, 192 pages, Publisher: Harrison House, Incorporated, Publication date: August 28, 1982
- Homosexuality: State of Birth or State of Mind?, First Edition, Pub. Date: September 1, 1989, Publisher: Harrison House, ISBN 0892745746, ISBN 978-0892745746
- Faith's Greatest Enemies, Paperback, ISBN 978-0-89274-920-1, ISBN 0-89274-920-2, Publisher: Harrison House, Incorporated, Publication date: January 2, 1995
- Race, Religion and Racism, Vol. 1, First Edition, Pub. Date: July 1999, Publisher: Anchor Distributors, ISBN 978-1-883798-36-9, ISBN 1-883798-36-1
- The Christian Family: Practical Insight for Family Living, 318 pages, ISBN 978-1-883798-17-8, ISBN 0-89274-541-X, Publisher: Faith One Publishing, Publication date: July 28, 2002
- How Faith Works, Paperback, 301 pages, ISBN 978-1-883798-57-4, ISBN 1-883798-57-4, Publisher: Faith One Publishing, Publication date: July 28, 2002
- The Holy Spirit: The Helper We All Need, Paperback, ISBN 978-1-883798-18-5, ISBN 1-883798-18-3, Publisher: Faith One Publishing, Publication date: July 28, 2002
- Race, Religion and Racism, Vol. 2, First Edition, ISBN 978-1-883798-48-2, ISBN 1-883798-48-5, Publisher: Anchor Distributors, Publication date: January 7, 2003
- Answered Prayer Guaranteed!: The Power of Praying with Faith, 224 pages, ISBN 978-1-59979-012-1, ISBN 1-59979-012-2, Publisher: Charisma Media, Publication date: August 28, 2006
- Prosperity: Good News for God's People, 192 pages, ISBN 978-1-59979-238-5, ISBN 1-59979-238-9, Publisher: Strang Communications Company, Publication date: January 28, 2008

== See also ==
- Price v. Stossel
- Pentecostalism
- Glossolalia
