= Veterans Barrington Park =

Park in Los Angeles, California, United States

- Location within the Los Angeles metropolitan area Location within California Location within the United States
- Type: Urban park
- Location: West Los Angeles (Los Angeles City Council District 11)
- Nearest city: Los Angeles, California
- Coordinates: 34.0629238°N 118.4671298°W
- Operator: Los Angeles County Department of Parks and Recreation
- Status: Open

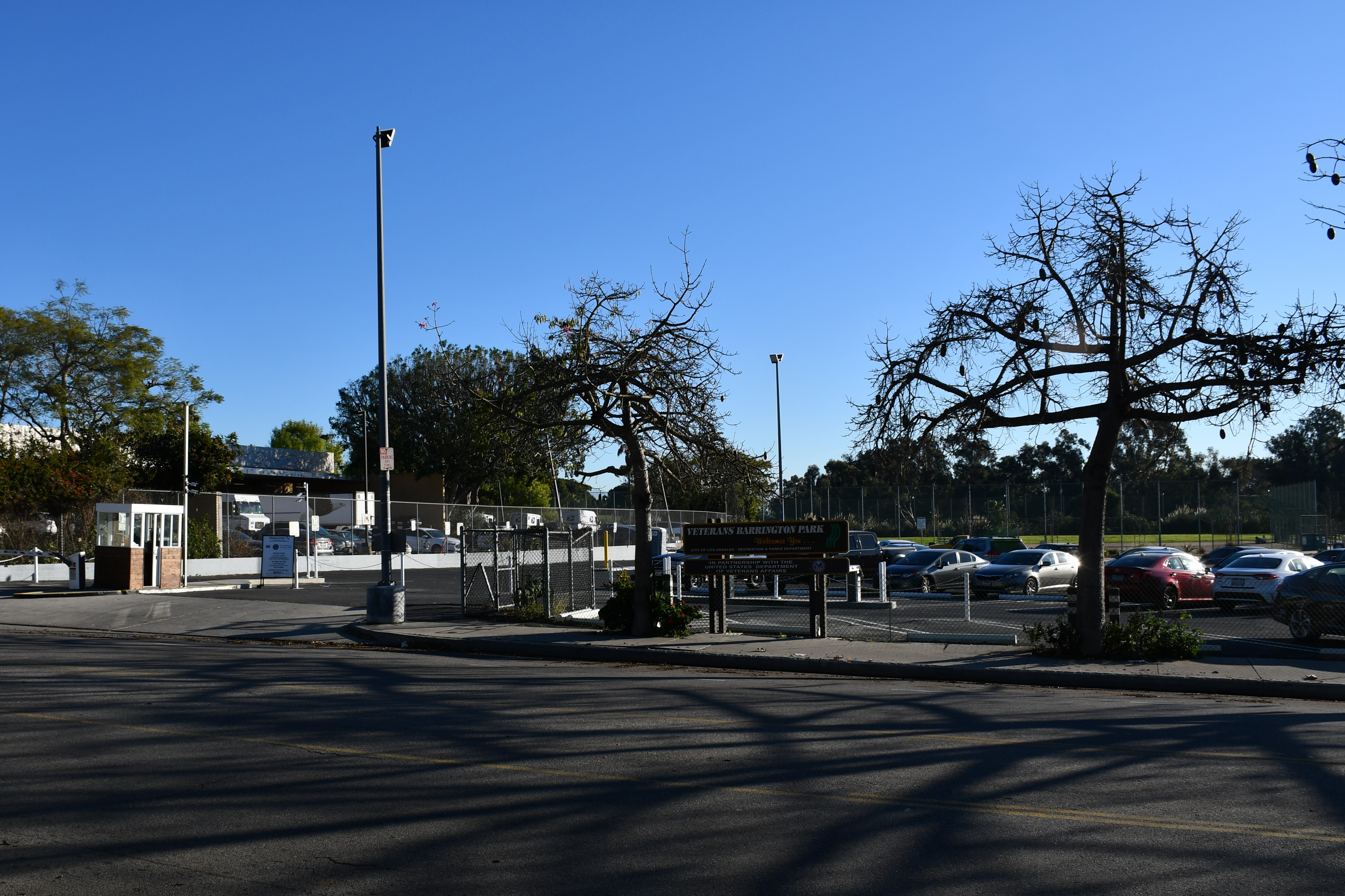
Veterans Barrington Park

Veterans Barrington Park is an urban park located in Los Angeles City Council District 11, Los Angeles, California. It features a baseball field, a leash-less dog park, and a grassy play area.
