= South Park, Los Angeles =

South Park
- Neighborhood of Los Angeles
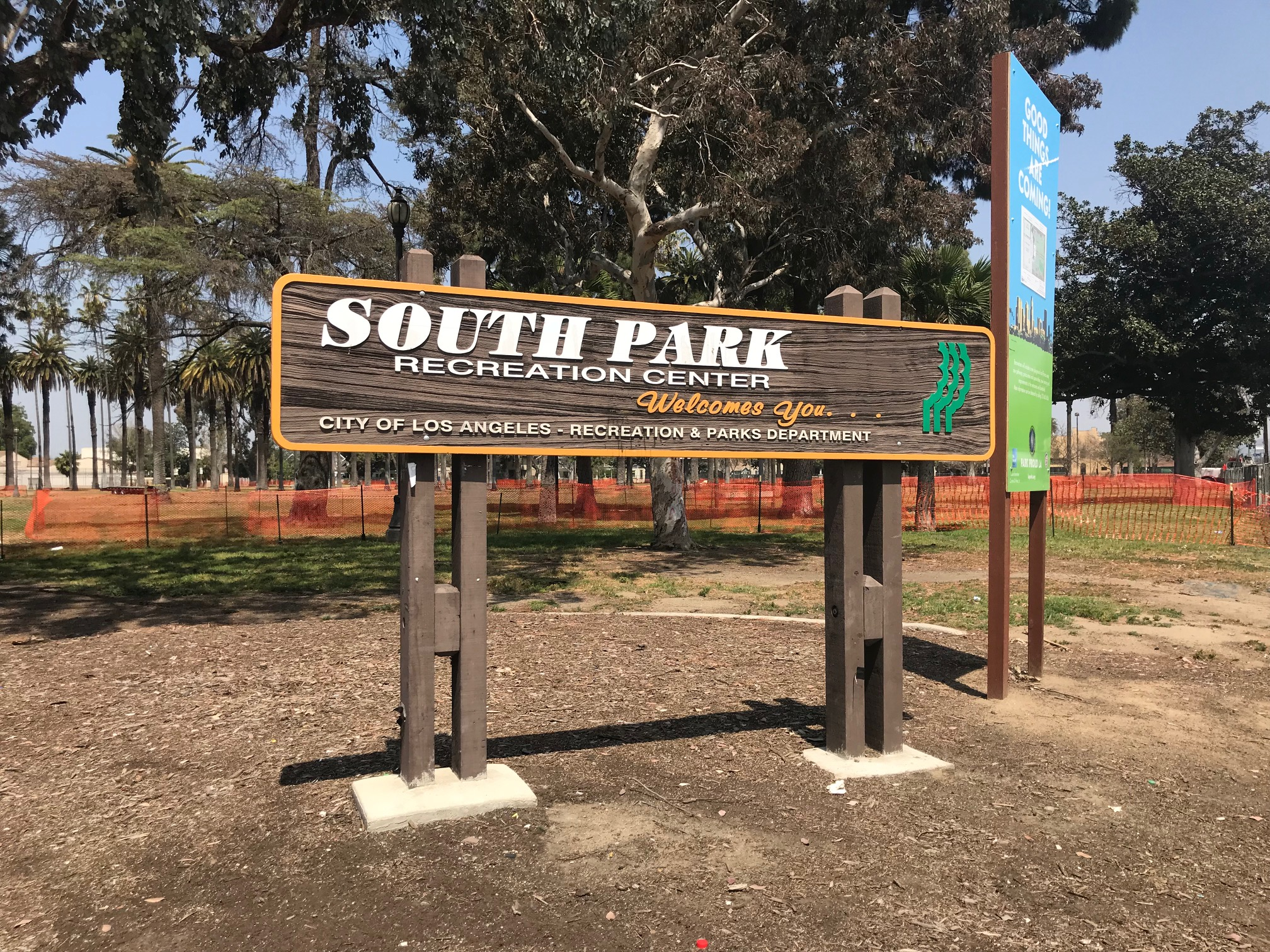
- South Park Recreation Center signage
- Interactive map of South Park
- Coordinates: 34.041304°N 118.261989°W
- Country: United States
- State: California
- County: Los Angeles
- City: Los Angeles

Area
  - Total: 1.41 sq mi (3.7 km^{2})
- Time zone: UTC+8:00 (PST)
  - Summer (DST): UTC+7:00 (PDT)
- Area code: 323 or 213

South Park is a 1.41-square-mile (3.65 km^{2}) neighborhood within the South Los Angeles region of Los Angeles, California.

== Geography ==
According to the Mapping L.A. project of the Los Angeles Times, South Park is bordered by Historic South Central on the north, Central-Alameda on the east, Florence on the south and Vermont-Slauson and Vermont Square on the west. The neighborhood's street boundaries are given as East Vernon Avenue on the north, Central Avenue on the east, Slauson Avenue on the south and the Harbor Freeway on the west.

== Demographics ==
According to Mapping L.A., a total of 30,496 people lived in South Park's 1.41 square miles, as measured by the 2000 U.S. census — averaging 21,638 people per square mile. Population was estimated at 32,851 in 2008. The median age was 23. The percentages of residents aged birth to 34 were among the county's highest.

Latinos made up 78.6% of the population, with African Americans at 19.2%, European Americans at 1%, Asian 0.1%, and other 1%. Mexico and El Salvador were the most common places of birth for the 49.4% of the residents who were born abroad.

The $29,518 median household income in 2008 dollars was considered low for the city and county. The percentage of households earning $20,000 or less was high, compared to the county at large. The average household size of 3.9 people was high for the city. Renters occupied 72.3% of the housing units, and homeowners occupied the rest.

In 2000 there were 1,607 families headed by single parents, or 27.9%. The percentages of never-married women (39.1) and never-married men (45.5).

In 2000 there were 569 military veterans, or 3% of the population.

== Recreation and parks ==
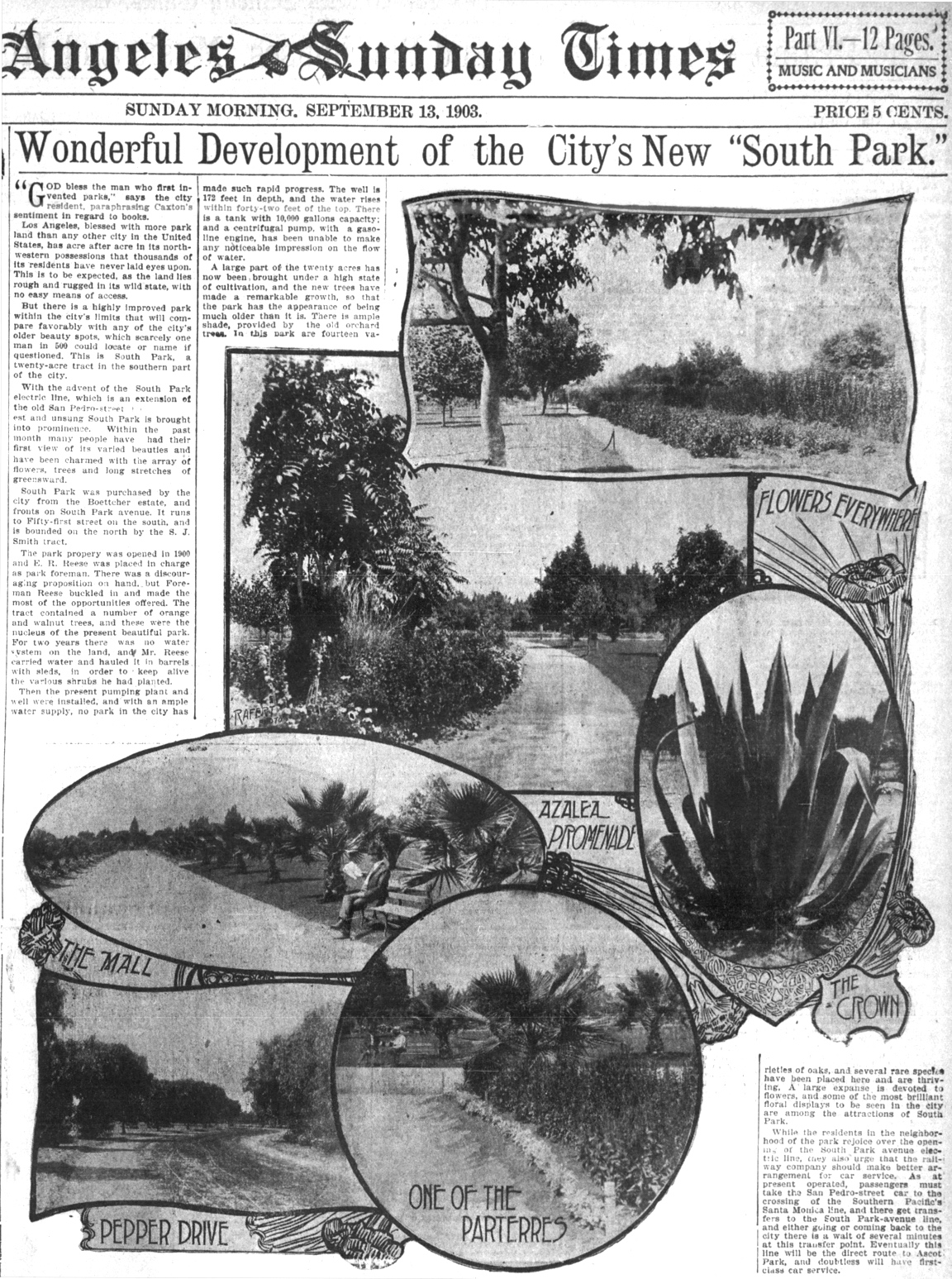
Los Angeles Times layout about the new South Park, September 13, 1903

The neighborhood's only recreation facility, South Park, at 345 East 51st Street, was established on a 20-acre plot purchased from "the Boetcher estate" in 1900, and after its planting with orange, oak and walnut trees, it was said to "compare favorably with any of the city's older beauty spots." It fronted on South Park Avenue, now Avalon Boulevard. The water well and pump house developed at that time are still in existence.

The park features a baseball diamond (lighted), basketball courts (lighted/outdoor), children's play area, picnic tables, seasonal pool (outdoor/unheated) and tennis courts (lighted).

== Education ==
The schools within South Park's boundaries are:

- George Washington Carver Middle School, LAUSD, 4410 McKinley Avenue
- Dr. Maya Angelou Community High School, LAUSD, 300 E 53rd St
- Synergy Kinetic Academy, LAUSD charter middle school, 1420 East Adams Boulevard
- Los Angeles Academy Middle School, LAUSD, 644 East 56th Street
- Celerity Dyad Charter School, LAUSD elementary, 4501 South Wadsworth Avenue
- Forty-Ninth Street Elementary School, LAUSD, 750 East 49th Street
- Aurora Elementary School, LAUSD, 1050 East 52nd Place
- Main Street Elementary School, LAUSD, 129 East 53rd Street
- Alliance College Ready Middle Academy #12
- Alliance Patti & Peter Neuwirth Leadership Academy
- Synergy Quantum Academy High School
