= Magnolia Square, Los Angeles =

- Neighborhood of Los Angeles
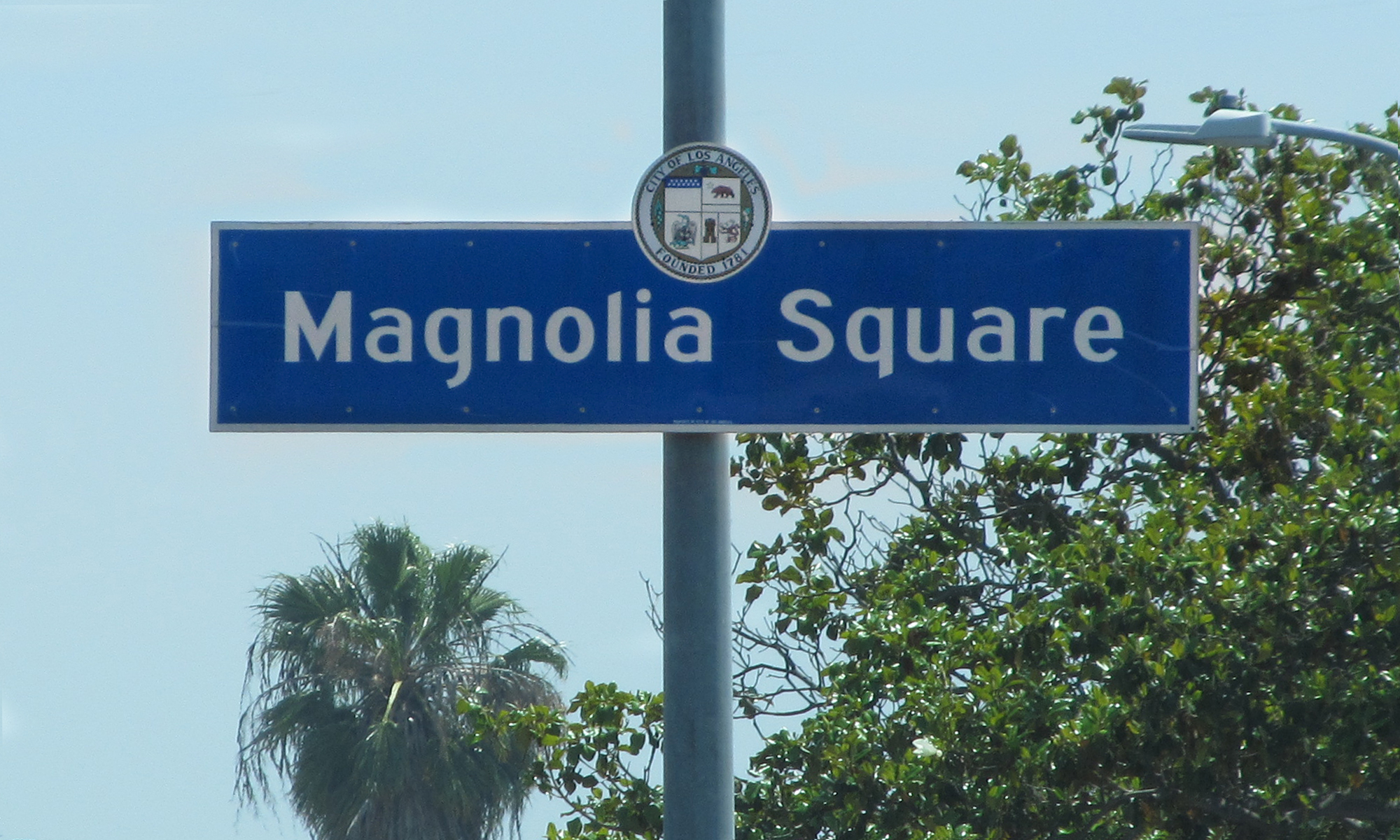
- Magnolia Square Neighborhood Sign on Century Boulevard and Vermont Avenue

- United States Los Angeles Southern
- Coordinates: 33°57′36″N 118°17′45″W
- Country: United States
- State: California
- County: Los Angeles
- Time zone: Pacific
- Zip Code: 90044
- Area code: 323

Magnolia Square is a neighborhood in Los Angeles, California.

== Geography ==
By city council action in October 2001 (C.F. #01-1874), "Magnolia Square" was officially named and designated as being bounded by the following streets: Century Boulevard on the north, South Vermont Avenue on the west, the Harbor Freeway (I-110) on the east, and Imperial Highway on the south.

The Department of Transportation was instructed to install signage at the following intersections: Figueroa Street at 109th Place, Figueroa at 99th Street, Century Boulevard at Grand Avenue, and Imperial Highway at Vermont Avenue.

== History ==
Beginning in 2000, the Eighth District Empowerment Congress began working on the "Naming Neighborhoods Project" to identify and name individual communities that had historically been grouped together and regarded as part of South Central Los Angeles.

The first focus group was held at Hebrew Union College in June 2000. Through research, a meeting with an urban historian, and numerous community meetings, the Empowerment Congress ultimately outlined sixteen unique neighborhoods, including the neighborhood of Magnolia Square. The names were submitted to City Council in October 2001 and approved in February 2002.

== Government ==
Magnolia Square lies within Los Angeles City Council District 8.

The neighborhood of Magnolia Square is split between two neighborhood councils: the Empowerment Congress Southeast Area Neighborhood Council serves Magnolia Square residents Century Boulevard and 110th Street and the Harbor Gateway North Neighborhood Council serves the area between 110th Street and Imperial Boulevard.

== Parks and recreation ==
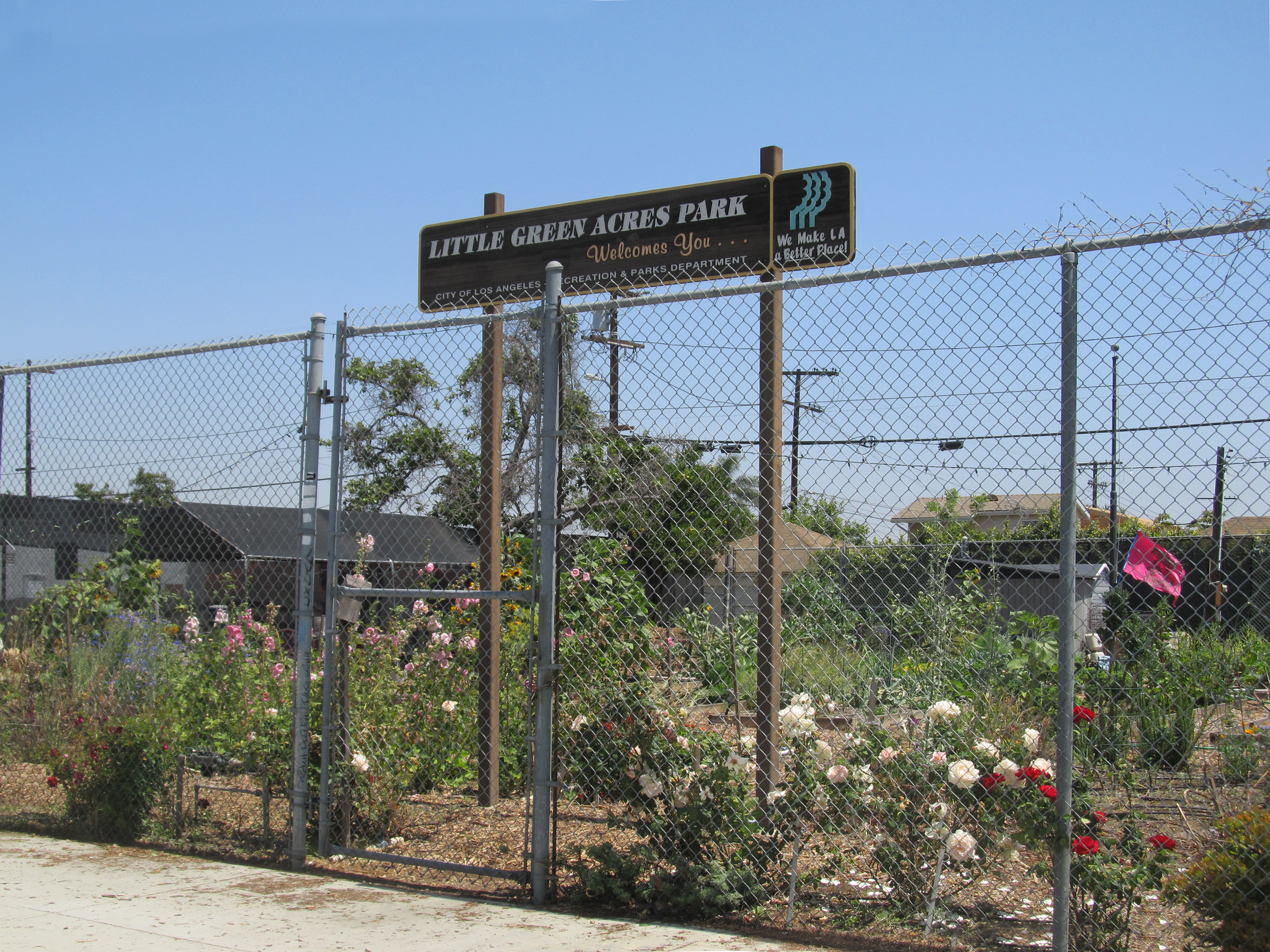
Little Green Acres Park, 2022

Two public parks are located within the boundaries of Magnolia Square:

- Little Green Acres Park-Community Garden, 104th Street and Vermont Avenue
- 105th Street Pocket Park, 609 West 105th Street

== Education ==
Two public schools are located within the boundaries of Magnolia Square:

- Figueroa Street Elementary School, LAUSD, 510 West 111th Street
- Washington Primary Center, LAUSD, 860 West 112th Street
