= Brentwood Country Mart =

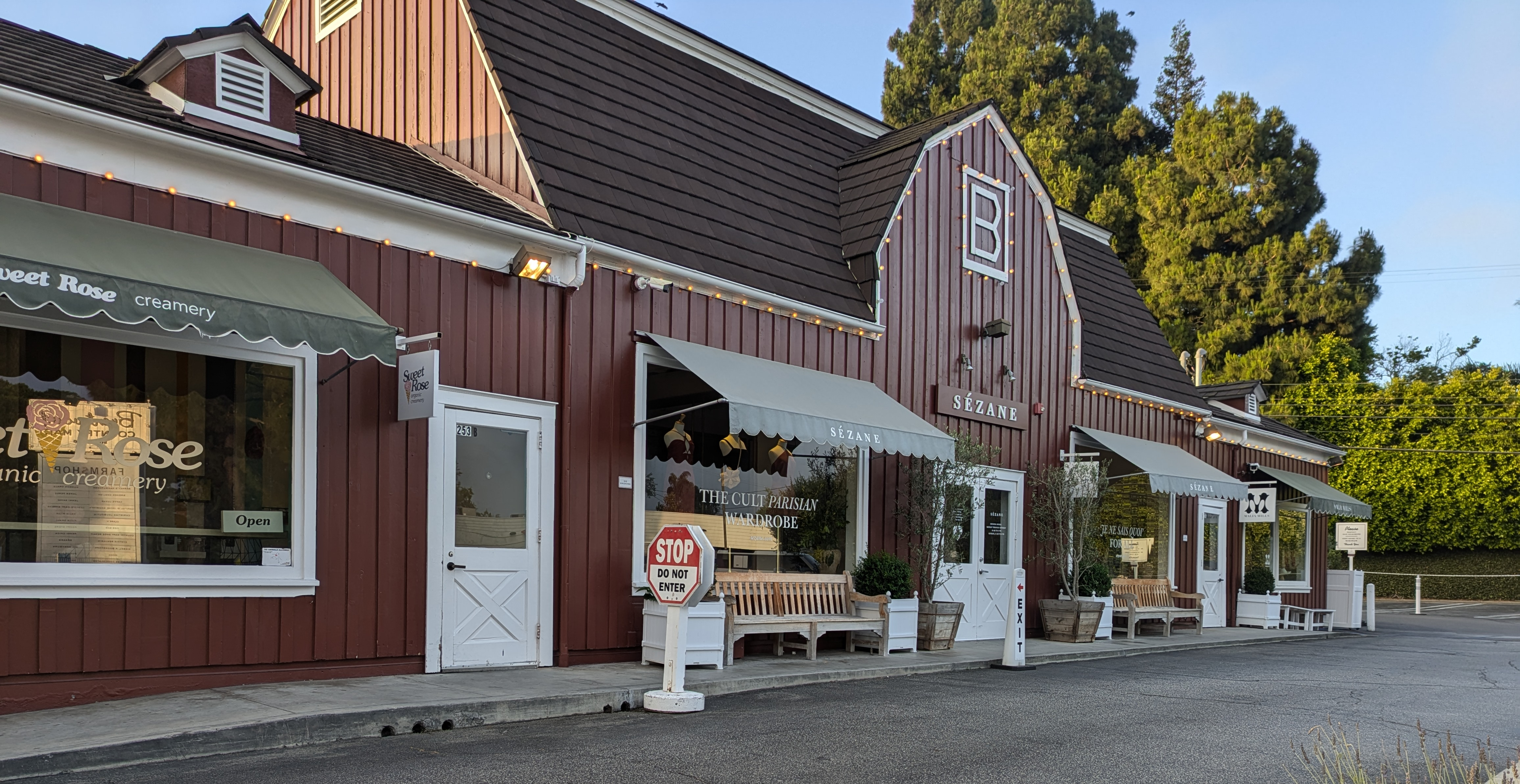
- Location: Brentwood, Los Angeles, California
- Coordinates: 34.0475109°N 118.4904307°W
- Address: 225 26th Street near San Vicente Boulevard
- Opened: 1948
- Owner: J.S. Rosenfield & Co
- Architect: Rowland Crawford
- Floor area: 30,000 sq ft (2,800 m^{2})
- Website: brentwoodcountrymart.com

The Brentwood Country Mart is a local shopping center in the Brentwood district of Los Angeles, California, next to the Santa Monica eastern city limit. First opened on November 18, 1948, "it's a quaint reminder of a bygone era, and Brentwood residents are very protective of it."

== Overview ==
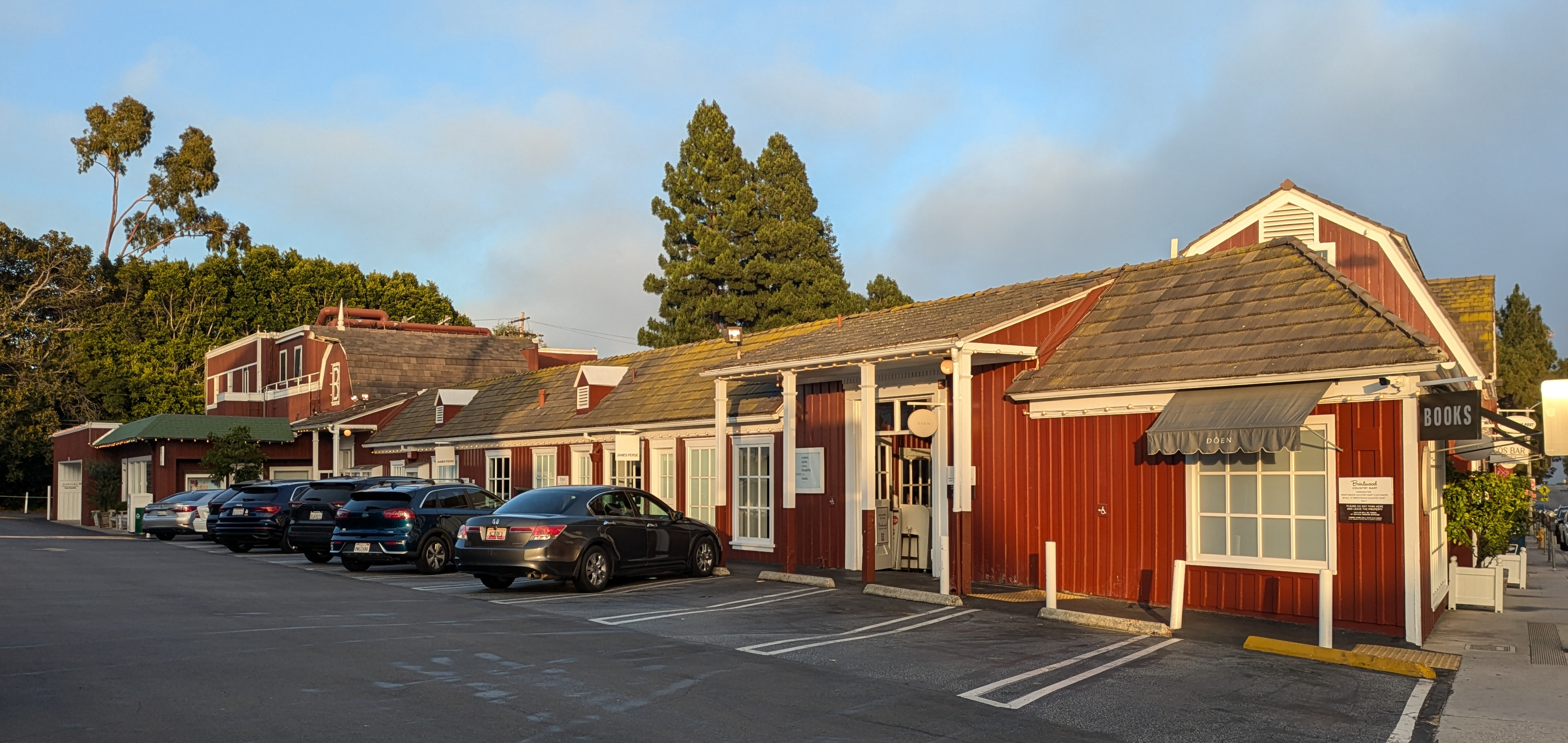
Brentwood Country Mart

The Brentwood Country Mart is a 30,000 sq ft (2,800 m^{2}) shopping center, located at 225 26th Street just south of San Vincente Boulevard. Architect Rowland Crawford designed the barn-like architecture.

The Mart has its own free parking lot and offers an outdoor dining area surrounding a large fire pit in the middle. The Mart hosts a variety of stores and dining options. Additionally, The Brentwood Country Mart offers a multitude of free events for families.

== History ==
In the 1920s, land was zoned in Brentwood Place; 26th Street and San Vicente Boulevard was reserved for commercial construction. The Herbert M. Baruch Corporation, a construction company that existed from the early 1920s until the mid 1950s, originally developed the country mart. Louis M. Sentei and A.L. Levin were the original owners of the mart. Their mission was to create a "one stop shopping" center in the heart of Brentwood. Architect Rowland Crawford, famous for designing the Santa Monica Sears Department Store, and phase two of the Los Angeles Times Building, designed a commercial building with a country feel to it. Sentei and Levin aimed to create a similarity to the Fairfax District Farmers' Market, a place containing a grouping of fresh food eateries. His design embodied the rural atmosphere of Brentwood at the time. The Country Mart included a post office, shoe repair, and barbershop, which are still present today.

=== J.S. Rosenfield and Co. ===
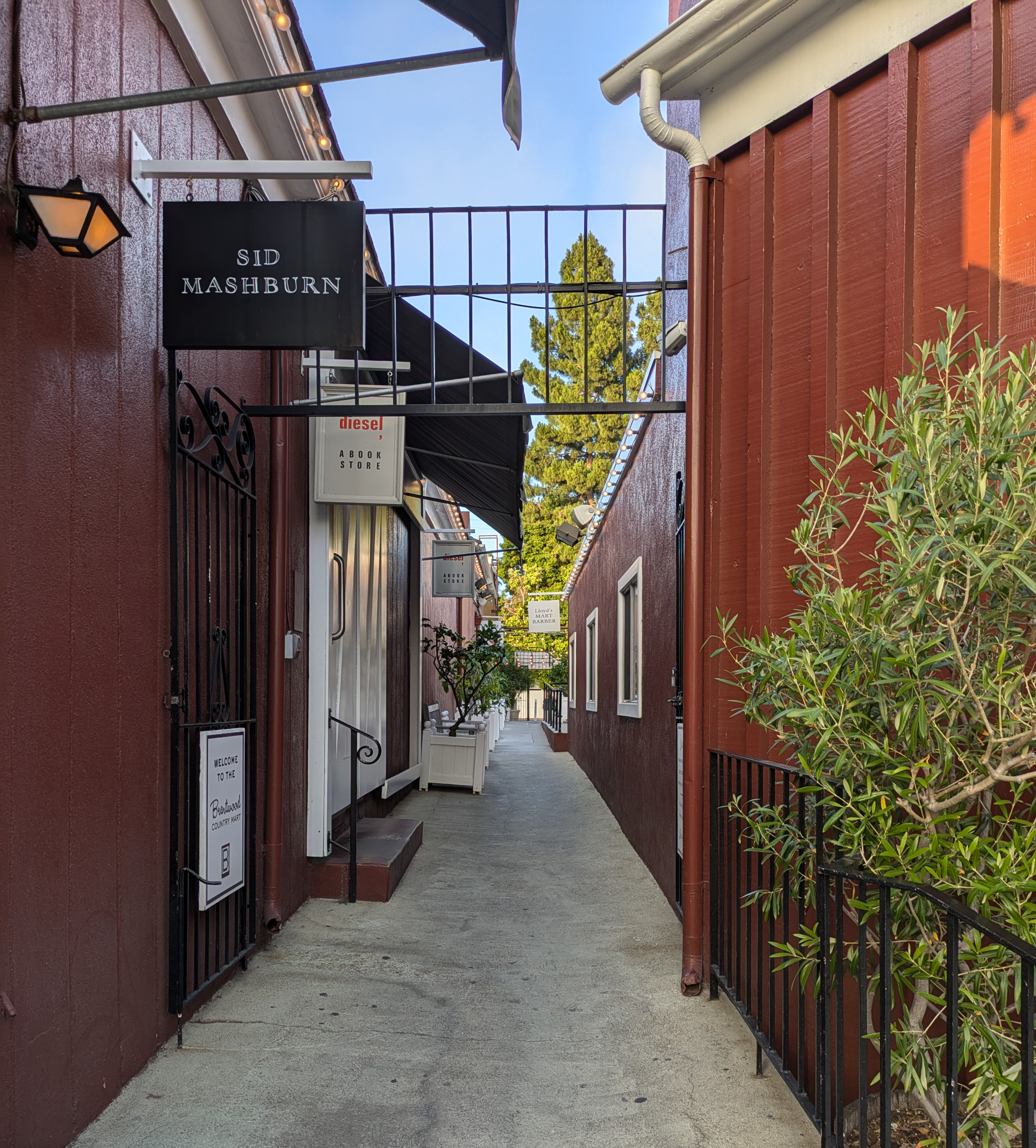

In 2003, the Brentwood Country Mart was acquired by James Rosenfield of J.S. Rosenfield and co. He restored the property architecturally, and reinstated many of the Mart's original offerings, such as a post office, food courtyard, barber shop, toy store, and shoe repair shop, as well as a rotating series of pop-up shops such as Kule and Rowing Blazers. J.S. Rosenfield and co. leased the property from John E. Anderson (the namesake of UCLA Anderson School of Business). J.S. Rosenfield and Co. is also the owner of the Montecito and Marin Country Marts, the Aero Theatre, and multiple other locations.

== Celebrity sightings ==
Since opening its doors, The Brentwood Country Mart has played host to a large number of celebrities. Upon opening, movie stars such as Shirley Temple, Elizabeth Taylor, Burt Lancaster, and Greta and Gregory Peck were frequent visitors. Ben Affleck, Dave Grohl, Reese Witherspoon, Rachel Zoe, Amy Adams, Jamie Lee Curtis, Sela Ward, and Jennifer Garner are among the celebrities who have also been sighted in 2011 and 2012.

== See also ==
- Palisades Village
