= Los Angeles Times Building =

Five sites housing regional newspaper

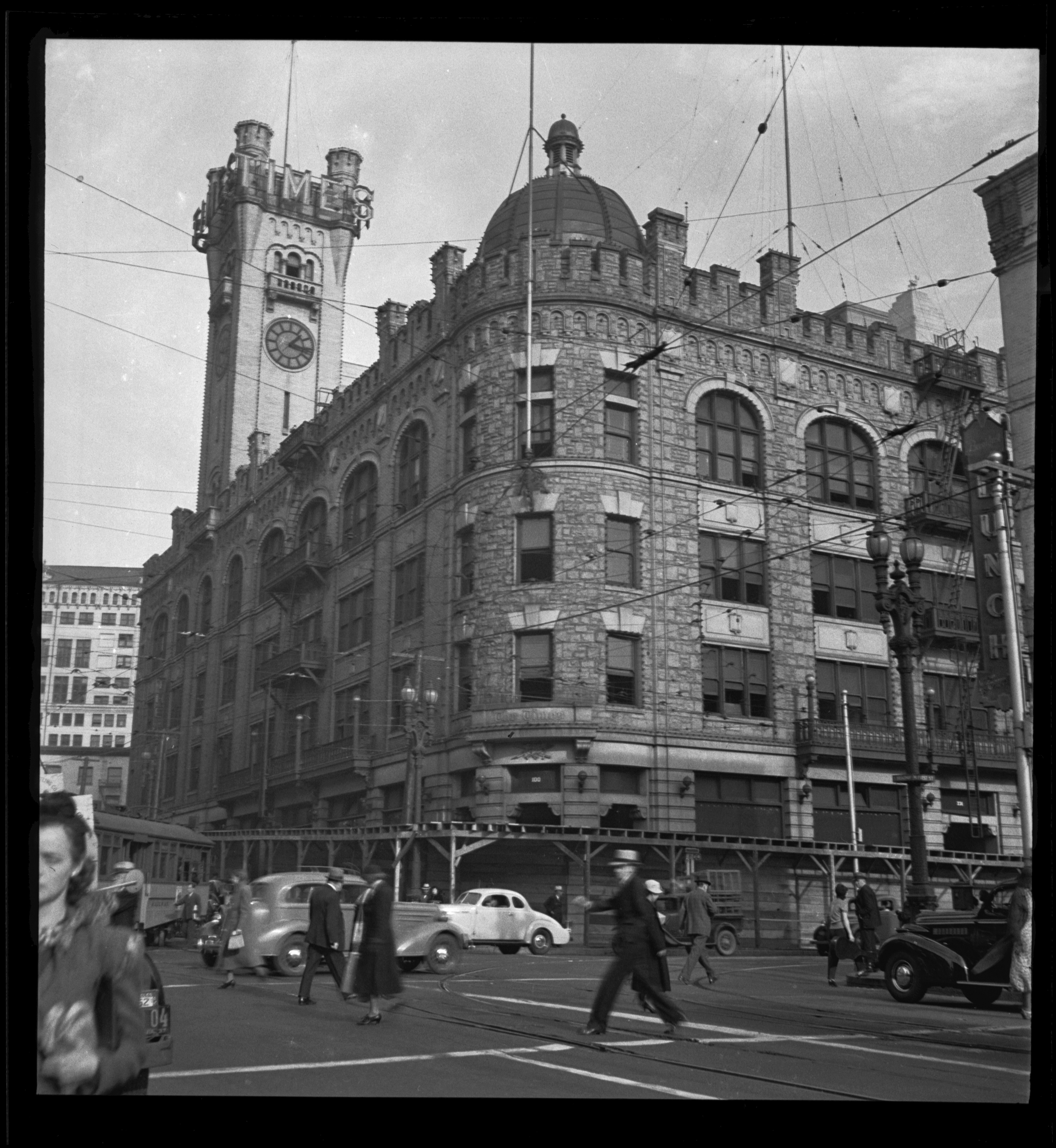
Los Angeles Times building (1912–1934), street view prior to demolition in 1938

Los Angeles Times Building refers to five buildings that have housed the Los Angeles Times offices since 1881. The fourth site, Times Mirror Square, is currently composed of four structures but in the absence of other specifics "Los Angeles Times Building" usually refers to the one built in 1935.

1. Mirror Building, home of Mirror Printing Office and Book Bindery (1881–1887), located near Spring and Temple
2. Los Angeles Times Building (1887–1910), located on the northwest corner of 1st and Broadway; destroyed in the Los Angeles Times bombing of 1910, killing 21 people
3. Los Angeles Times Building (1912–1934), new construction on the same site as previous, rebuilt as a four-story building with "castle-like" clock tower
4. Los Angeles Times Building (1935–2018), street address 202 W. First Street, original structure on the southwest corner of 1st and Spring designed by Gordon Kaufmann. Construction began 1931. Eventually the Times expanded to fill the whole block as Times Mirror Square, bounded by 1st, 2nd, Spring and Broadway. Later Times Mirror Square additions included the 1948 Rowland H. Crawford expansion, the 1973 William Pereira addition, and a parking structure.
5. Los Angeles Times Building (2018– ), a mid-century eight-story building on Imperial Highway in El Segundo, located near the Los Angeles International Airport

== Gallery ==
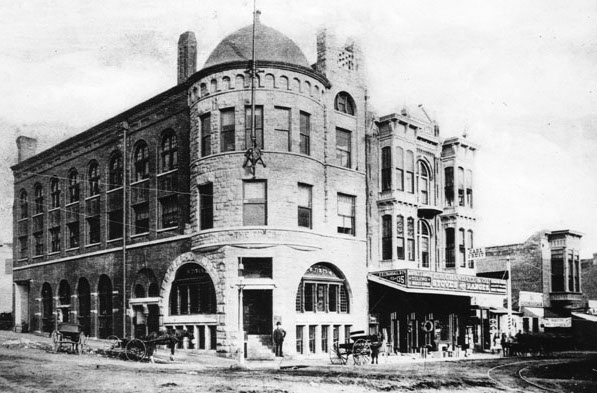
1886 building, northeast corner 1st/Broadway

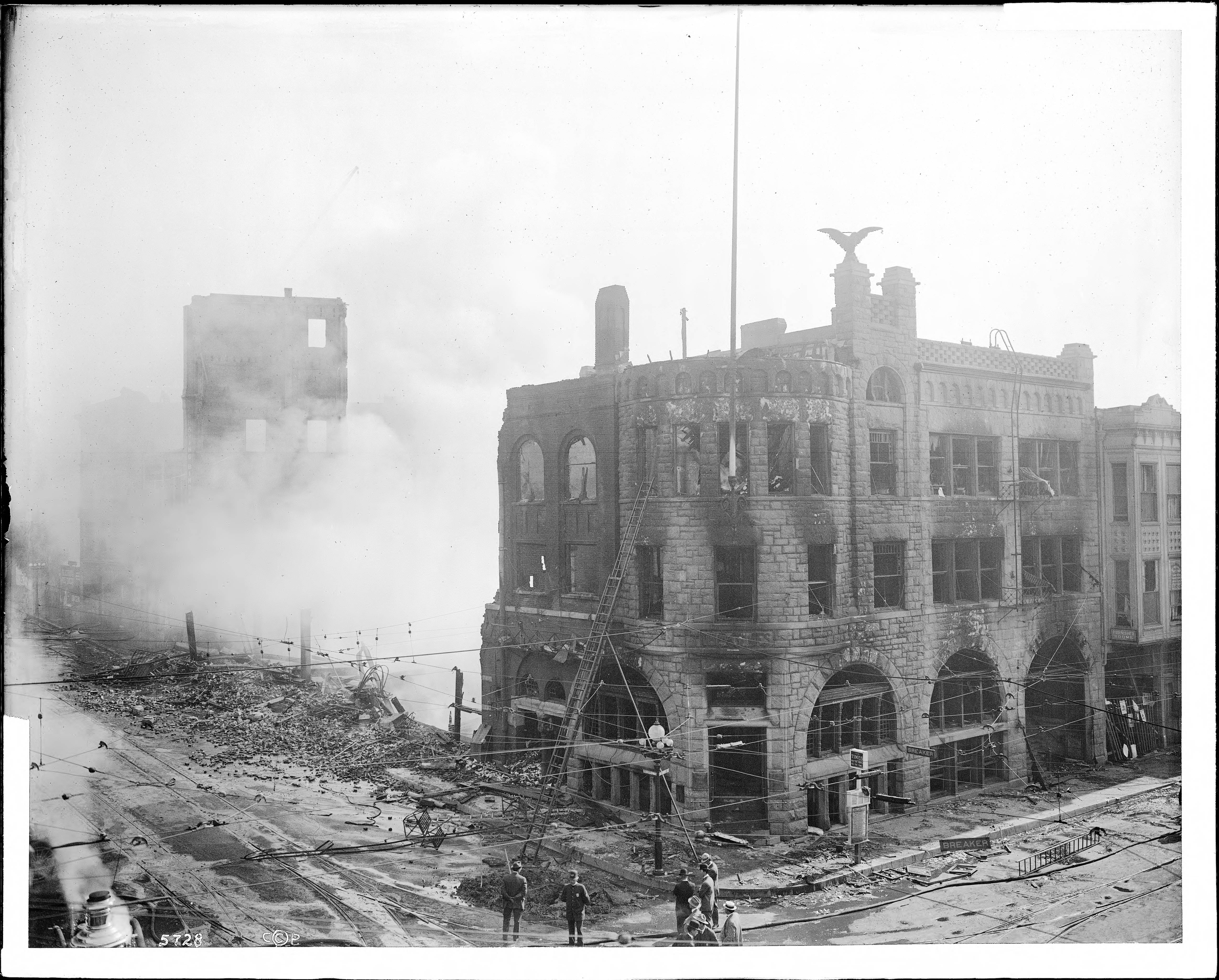
1886 building after bombing on October 1, 1910

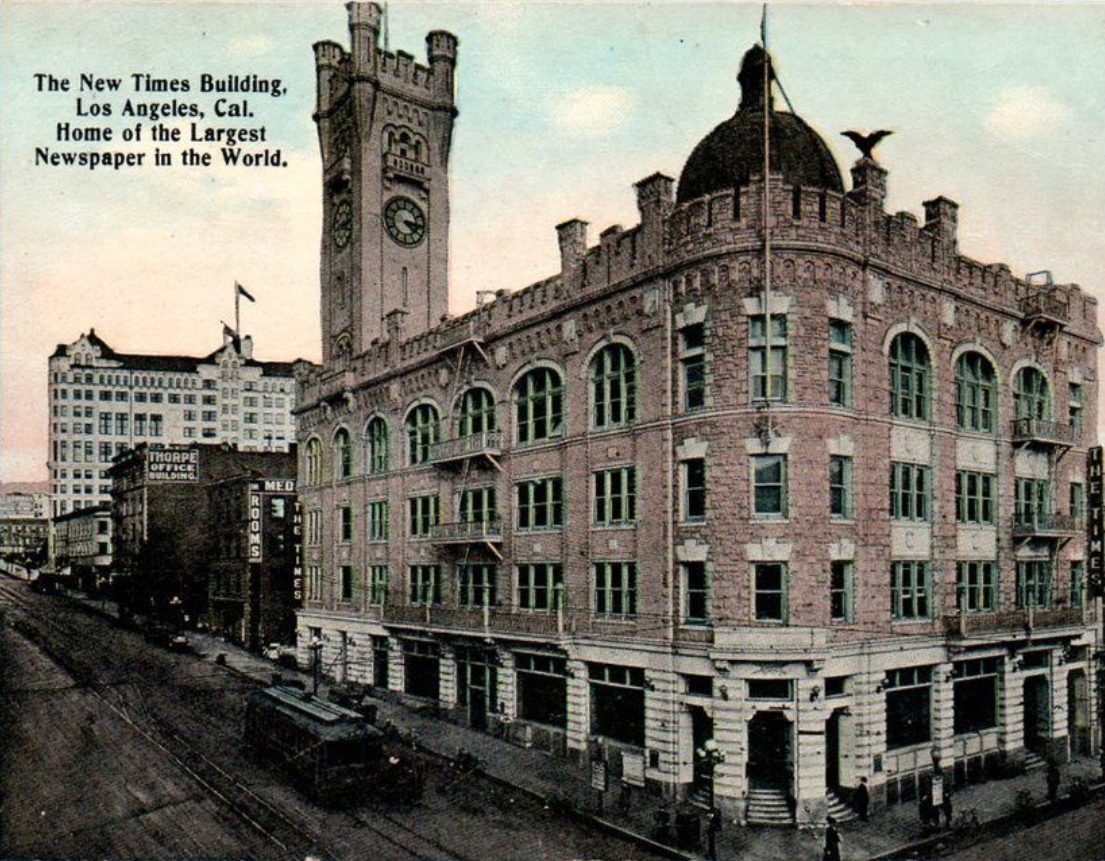
1912 building, demolished in 1938

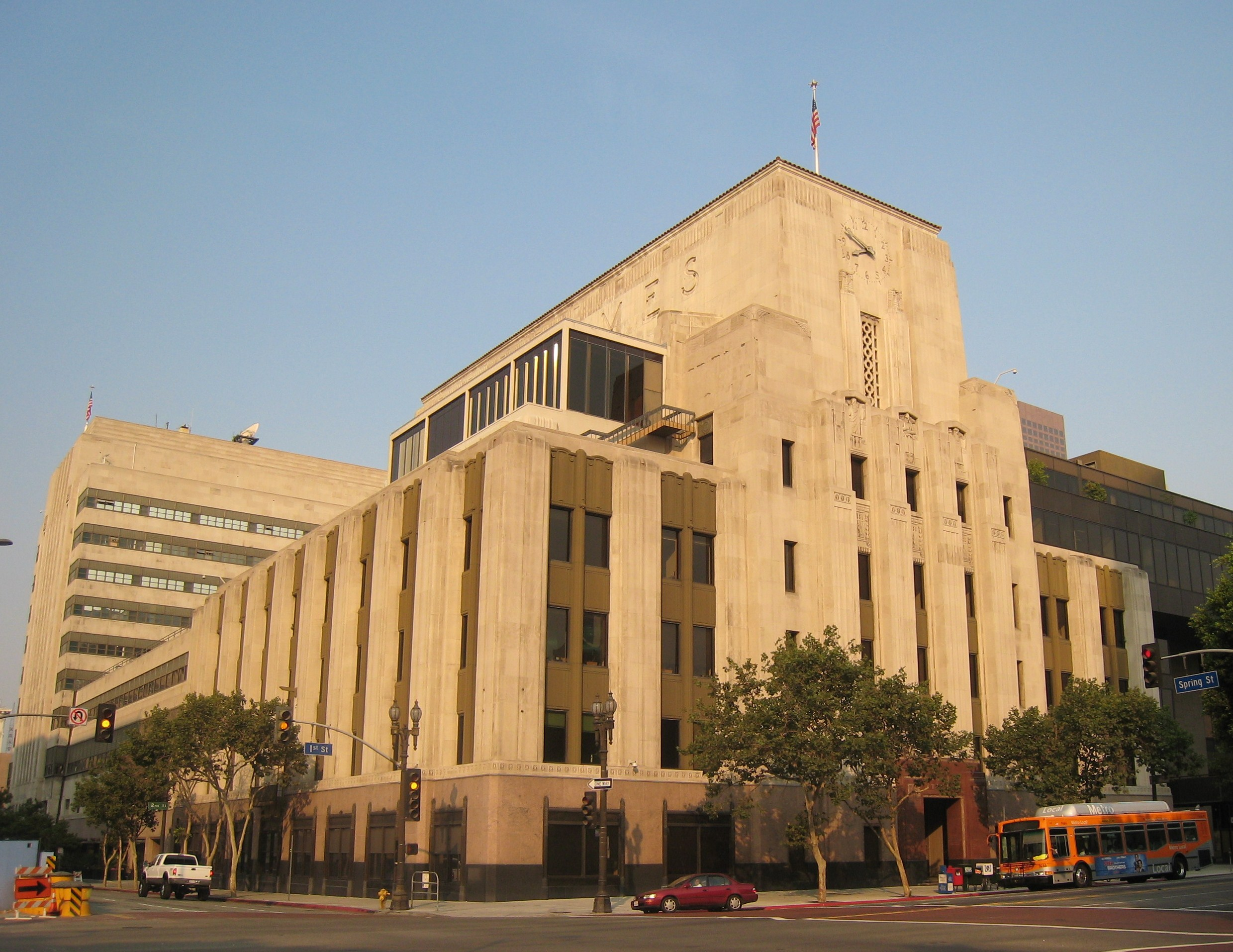
Los Angeles Times Building, corner of 1st and Spring

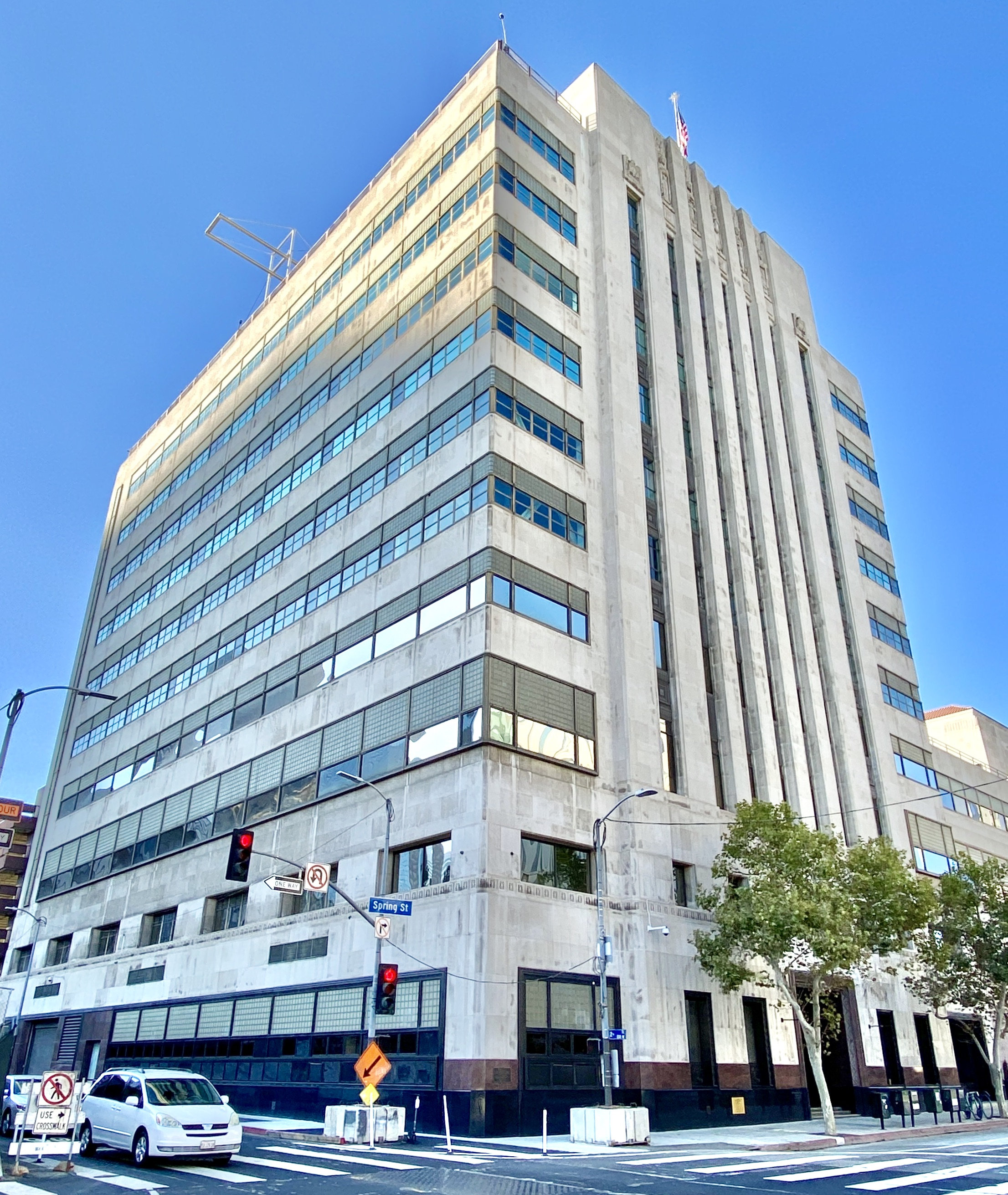
1948 Crawford Addition (or Mirror Building), NW corner 2nd/Spring, 2020

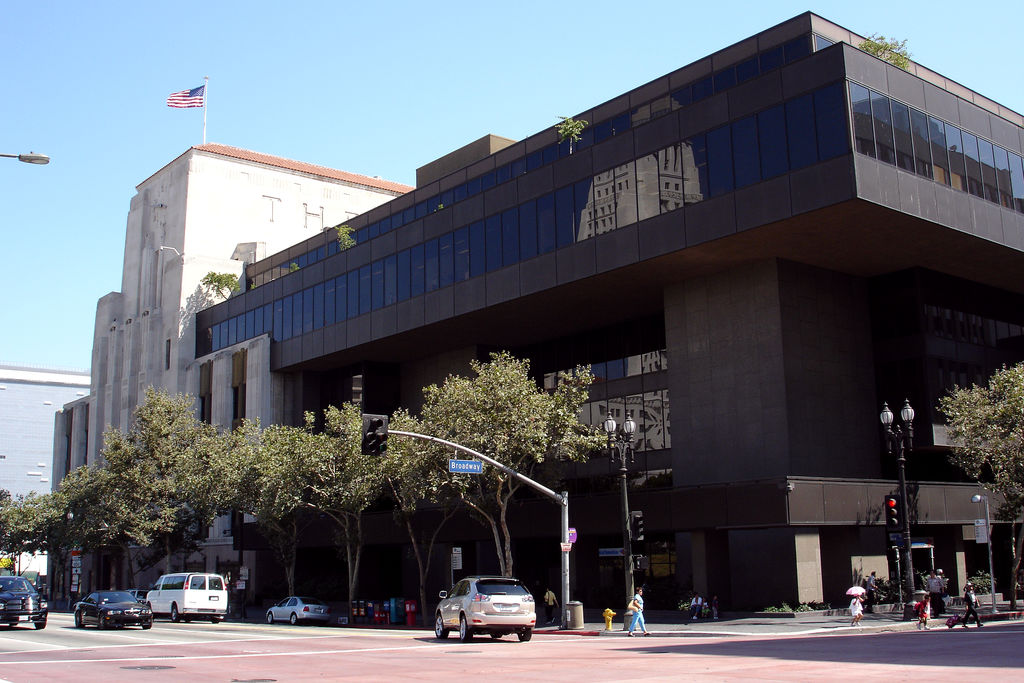
1973 Pereira Addition, southeast corner 1st and Broadway

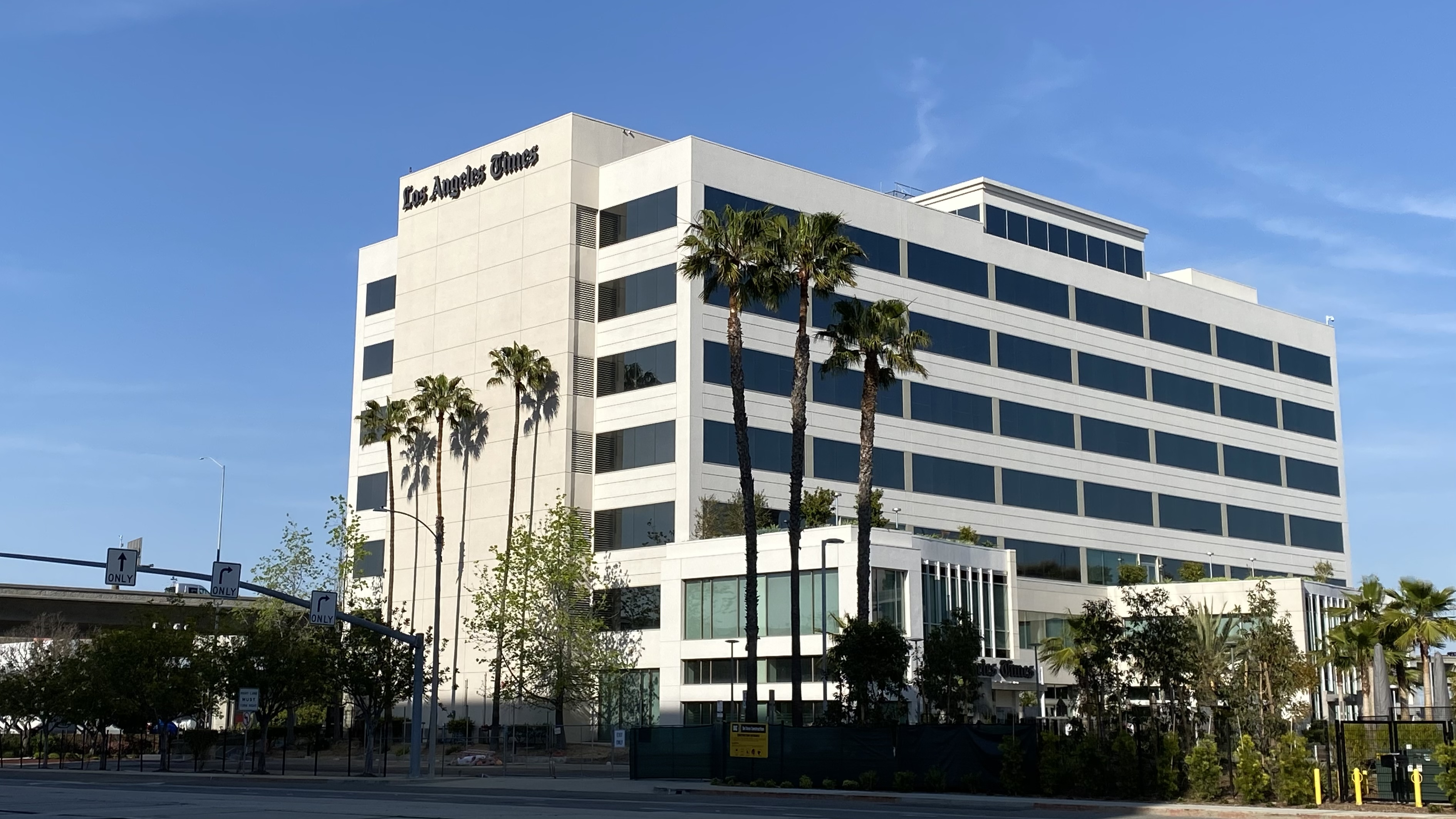
Fifth Los Angeles Times Building, adjacent to LAX in El Segundo, California
