= San Vicente Boulevard (Santa Monica) =

East-west street in Santa Monica and Brentwood, California

- West end: Ocean Boulevard in Santa Monica; 34.0260°N 118.5134°W
- East end: Wilshire Blvd. in Los Angeles; 34.0509°N 118.4591°W

San Vicente Boulevard is an east–west street in Santa Monica and Brentwood, in the Westside region of Los Angeles, California.

== Route and addressing ==
San Vicente is the northernmost primary thoroughfare in Santa Monica. San Vicente begins at Ocean Avenue at Palisades Park (Santa Monica) adjacent to the historic Native American totem pole sculpture of public art, and heads east. Continuing through Santa Monica, the route begins to curve south. San Vicente enters the city of Los Angeles at 26th Street. San Vicente becomes the central thoroughfare in downtown Brentwood, home to many restaurants and popular shops. San Vicente curves to the south at the Los Angeles Veterans Administration complex, intersecting Wilshire Boulevard, where it ends, becoming Federal Avenue and continuing south into West Los Angeles. The entire route carries a wide median with abundant grass and trees, with traffic lights only at 7th Street and 26th Street between Ocean Avenue and Bundy Drive.

Intersections with Ocean Avenue and 7th Street in Santa Monica lead down to Santa Monica Canyon and on to the Pacific Coast Highway. The intersection with 26th Street (north) connects with Sunset Boulevard and Mandeville Canyon. For most of its length, it runs generally parallel and south of Sunset Boulevard and north of Montana Avenue and Wilshire Boulevard.

Some navigation systems call this street West San Vicente to differentiate it from the other San Vicente Boulevard that intersects Wilshire 5.5 miles (8.9 km) to the east.

Street numbering increases to the west, beginning with the number 11400 at Wilshire Boulevard. The last number on San Vicente Boulevard in Los Angeles' address grid is 13100. On the Santa Monica side, the numbering follows that city's grid, beginning at 2600 and decreasing towards the ocean. At Ocean Avenue, the road terminates at number 100.

== Features ==
San Vicente Boulevard is four lanes wide with a large landscaped median along its entire length, planted with ~120 large coral trees (Erythrina afra), along its center. Those in the western section within Los Angeles, between 26th Street and Bringham Avenue, are a designated Los Angeles Historic-Cultural Monument. The median is popular with joggers.

Other features along the boulevard include The Brentwood Country Mart at 26th and San Vicente, and the private Brentwood Country Club and golf course.

The Santa Monica and Brentwood neighborhoods north of San Vicente Boulevard often have larger properties with distinctive residences.

== History ==
Built in the early 20th century to run from the Soldiers' Home (Sawtelle Veterans Home) to Ocean Avenue, the boulevard was named for the Rancho San Vicente y Santa Monica that had previously occupied the area. This tree-lined street was 130 feet (40 m) wide, with trolley lines used by the Los Angeles Pacific Electric Railway running down its center. It was oiled and surfaced in 1906 and, when completed, "made one of the finest drives in the country."

The Mezzaluna Trattoria, formerly located at 11750 San Vicente Boulevard, was involved in one of Los Angeles' most notorious murders: the O. J. Simpson murder case. Nicole Brown Simpson was a frequent patron and had eaten there with her family on the last night of her life. Her friend Ronald Goldman, a waiter at the restaurant, was also murdered at Brown's condominium that night, when he had stopped by to return the eyeglasses Brown's mother had left behind at the restaurant.

15 months later, Goldman's friend and fellow Mezzaluna Trattoria waiter, Michael Nigg, was murdered in Hollywood, in a crime F. Lee Bailey described as "fishy". In separate books, Bailey and the authors of Killing Time: The First Full Investigation Into the Unsolved Murders of Nicole Brown Simpson and Ronald Goldman (1996), Donald Freed and Raymond P. Briggs, have noted that the restaurant was the nexus of drug trafficking in Brentwood, and Nigg and Goldman were not the only Mezzaluna waiters who had fallen victim to foul play around that time: two others were missing, and a third had his car destroyed by fire in Corona del Mar during 1994.

The restaurant's patronage suffered in the wake of the murders and the lengthy O.J. Simpson murder trial, and the establishment closed in 1997. The building now under new ownership, currently is vacant.

== See also ==
- List of Los Angeles Historic-Cultural Monuments on the Westside
- Streets in Los Angeles
- Streets in Los Angeles County, California
