= Brentwood, Los Angeles =

Brentwood
- Neighborhood of Los Angeles
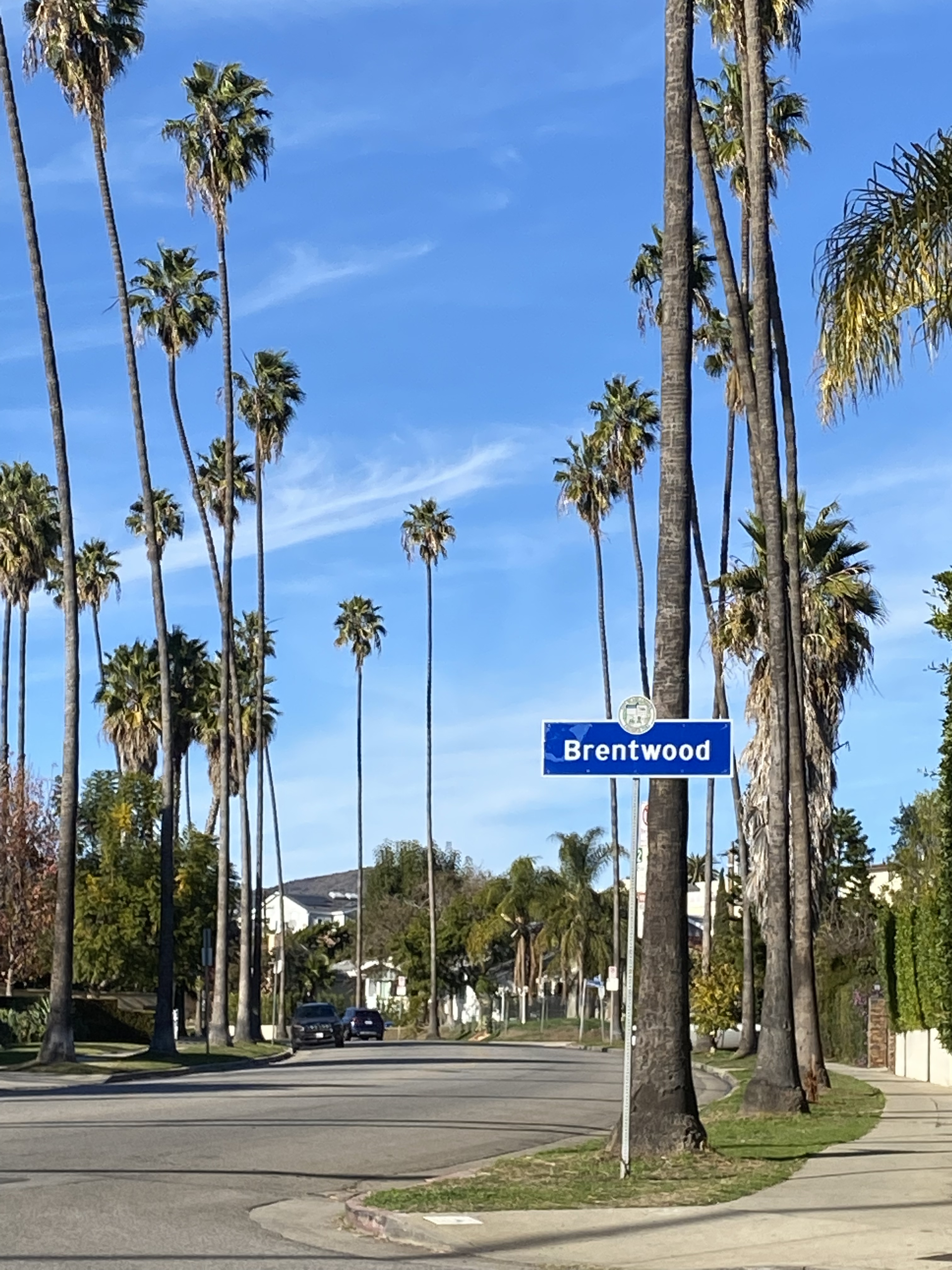
- Brentwood neighborhood sign

- Location within Western Los Angeles
- Coordinates: 34°03′07″N 118°28′28″W
- Country: United States
- State: California
- County: Los Angeles
- City: Los Angeles
- Elevation: 315 ft (96 m)
- Time zone: UTC−8 (PST)
  - Summer (DST): UTC−7 (PDT)
- ZIP Code: 90049
- Area codes: 310, 424

Brentwood is a primarily residential neighborhood in the City of Los Angeles, part of the Westside area of the Los Angeles Basin.

== History ==
=== General ===
Modern development began after the establishment of the 600-acre (2.4 km^{2}) Pacific Branch of the National Home for Disabled Soldiers and Sailors in the 1880s. A small community sprang up outside that facility's west gate, taking on the name Westgate. Annexed by the city of Los Angeles on June 14, 1916, Westgate's 49 mi^{2} (130 km^{2}) included large parts of what is now Pacific Palisades and a small portion of today's Bel-Air. Westgate Avenue is one of the last reminders of that namesake.

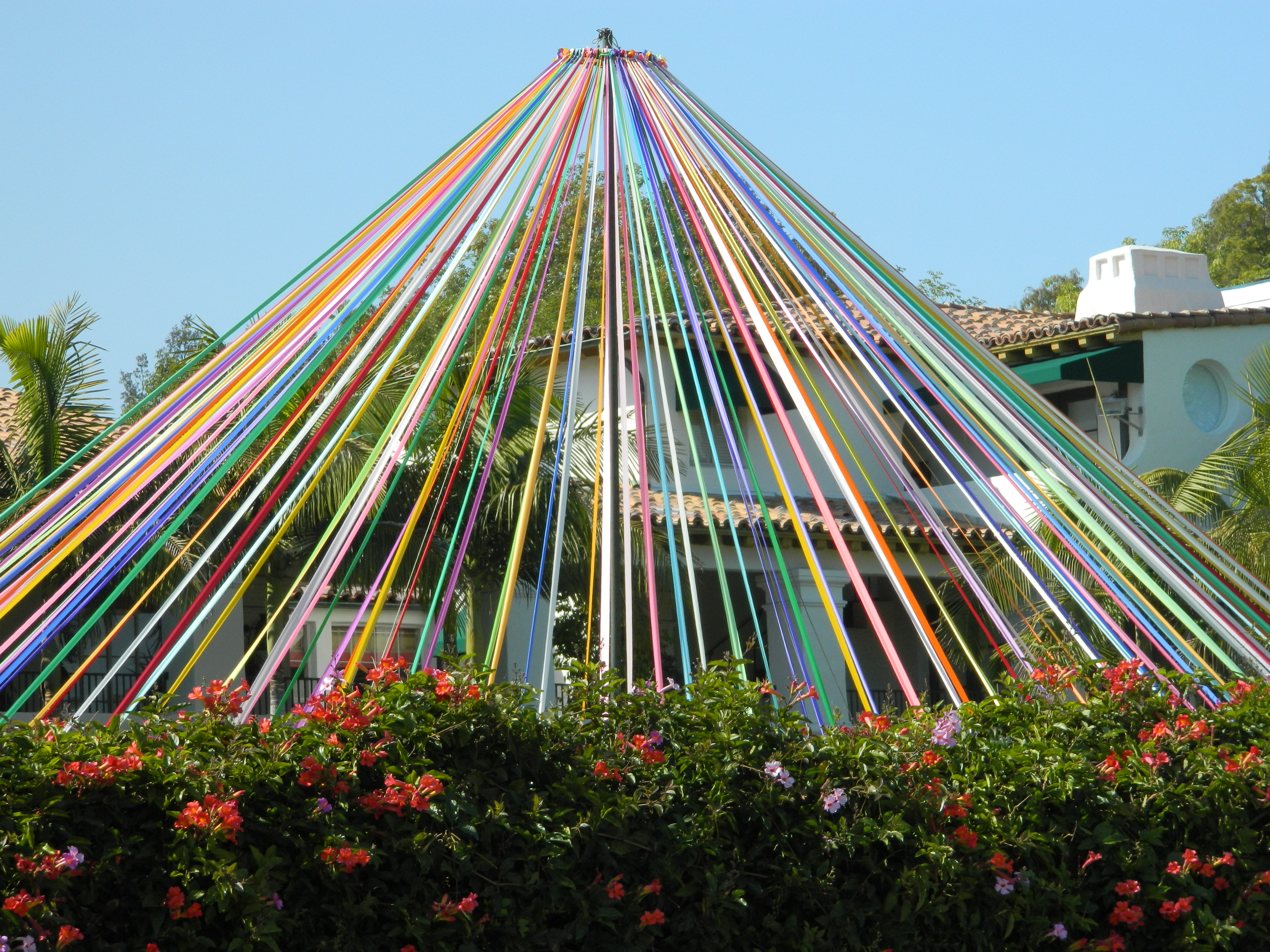
Archer School for Girls maypole tradition

Local traditions include a Maypole erected each year on the lawn of The Archer School for Girls, carrying on that set by the Eastern Star Home previously housed there. This building was the exterior establishing shot for the "Mar Vista Rest Home" that provided a key scene in the 1974 film Chinatown.

=== Very High Fire Hazard Severity Zone designation ===
The State Cal-Fire Authority officially designated Brentwood, from Mulholland down to Sunset Boulevard, a Very High Fire Hazard Severity Zone, due to the long, uninterrupted border of urban-wildlife interface in the hillsides that has resulted in multiple fires over many years, destroying entire neighborhoods and requiring numerous evacuations. For this reason, the Brentwood community has been strongly in favor of halting all further development in the hillside and canyon areas.

On November 6, 1961, a construction crew working in Sherman Oaks in the San Fernando Valley north of Brentwood on the far side of the Santa Monica Mountains noticed smoke and flames in a nearby pile of rubbish. Within minutes, Santa Ana winds gusting up to 60 mph (100 km/h) sent burning brush aloft and over the ridge into Brentwood.

More than 300 police officers helped evacuate 3,500 residents during the 12-hour fire, and some 2,500 firefighters battled the blaze, pumping water from neighborhood swimming pools to douse flames. Pockets of the fire smoldered for several days. Even as firefighters battled what was to become a Bel Air disaster, another fire erupted in Santa Ynez Canyon to the west. That blaze was contained the next day after consuming nearly 10,000 acres (40 km^{2}) and nine structures and burning to within a mile of Bel Air and Brentwood. The fires were the fifth-worst conflagration in the nation's history at the time, burning 16,090 acres (65 km^{2}), destroying 484 homes and 190 other structures and causing an estimated $30 million in damage.

=== O. J. Simpson murder case ===
Brentwood was the site of the 1994 stabbing deaths of Nicole Brown Simpson and Ronald Goldman, outside Nicole Brown Simpson's Bundy Drive townhouse. Nicole's ex-husband, football player and actor O. J. Simpson, was acquitted of the murders, but was later found liable for the deaths in a civil trial. Simpson's Brentwood home on North Rockingham Avenue was subsequently sold. The new owners demolished Simpson's home and built a new residence.

== Geography ==
=== Boundaries ===
The district is located at the base of the Santa Monica Mountains, bounded by the San Diego Freeway on the east, Wilshire Boulevard on the south, the Santa Monica city limits on the southwest, Sullivan Canyon/Westridge Trail on the west and Mulholland Drive on the north.

=== Environment ===
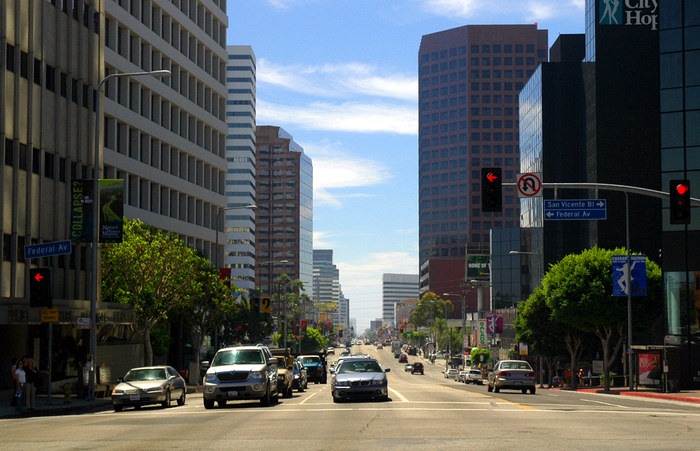
A view of Wilshire Boulevard westbound, toward the ocean, 2005. Brentwood is on the right side of the street.

Brentwood, like nearby Santa Monica, has a temperate climate influenced by water breezes off the Pacific Ocean. Residents frequently wake to a "marine layer", sunshine and birds singing. The topography is generally split into two characters, broadly divided by Sunset Boulevard: the area north of Sunset is defined by ridges and canyons of the Santa Monica Mountains and is located in a Cal-Fire designated Very High Fire Hazard Severity Zone; south of Sunset Boulevard the area is mostly flat. The area south of San Vicente Boulevard features an underground spring which bubbles up into a small creek along "the Gully" near the Brentwood Country Club.

Climate data for Brentwood, Los Angeles
Month	Jan	Feb	Mar	Apr	May	Jun	Jul	Aug	Sep	Oct	Nov	Dec	Year
Mean daily maximum °F (°C)	67 (19)	68 (20)	69 (21)	73 (23)	75 (24)	80 (27)	85 (29)	86 (30)	84 (29)	80 (27)	72 (22)	67 (19)	76 (24)
Mean daily minimum °F (°C)	47 (8)	48 (9)	48 (9)	50 (10)	53 (12)	57 (14)	60 (16)	61 (16)	60 (16)	56 (13)	50 (10)	47 (8)	53 (12)
Average precipitation inches (mm)	4.76 (121)	5.15 (131)	4.13 (105)	0.96 (24)	0.34 (8.6)	0.08 (2.0)	0.02 (0.51)	0.17 (4.3)	0.32 (8.1)	0.65 (17)	1.59 (40)	2.65 (67)	20.81 (529)

== Demographics ==
The 2000 U.S. census counted 31,344 residents in the 15.22-square-mile (39.4 km^{2}) Brentwood neighborhood—or 2,059 inhabitants per square mile (795/km^{2}). In 2008, the city estimated that the population had increased to 33,312.

The population was 84.2% Non-Hispanic White, 6.5% Asian American, 4.5% Hispanic or Latino, 1.2% African American, and 3.6% of other origins. Iran (27.2%) and the United Kingdom (4.8%) were the most common places of birth for the 21.1% of the residents who were born abroad—which was a low percentage for Los Angeles as a whole. The median yearly household income in 2008 dollars was $112,927, high for the city of Los Angeles as well as the county.

== Notable sights ==
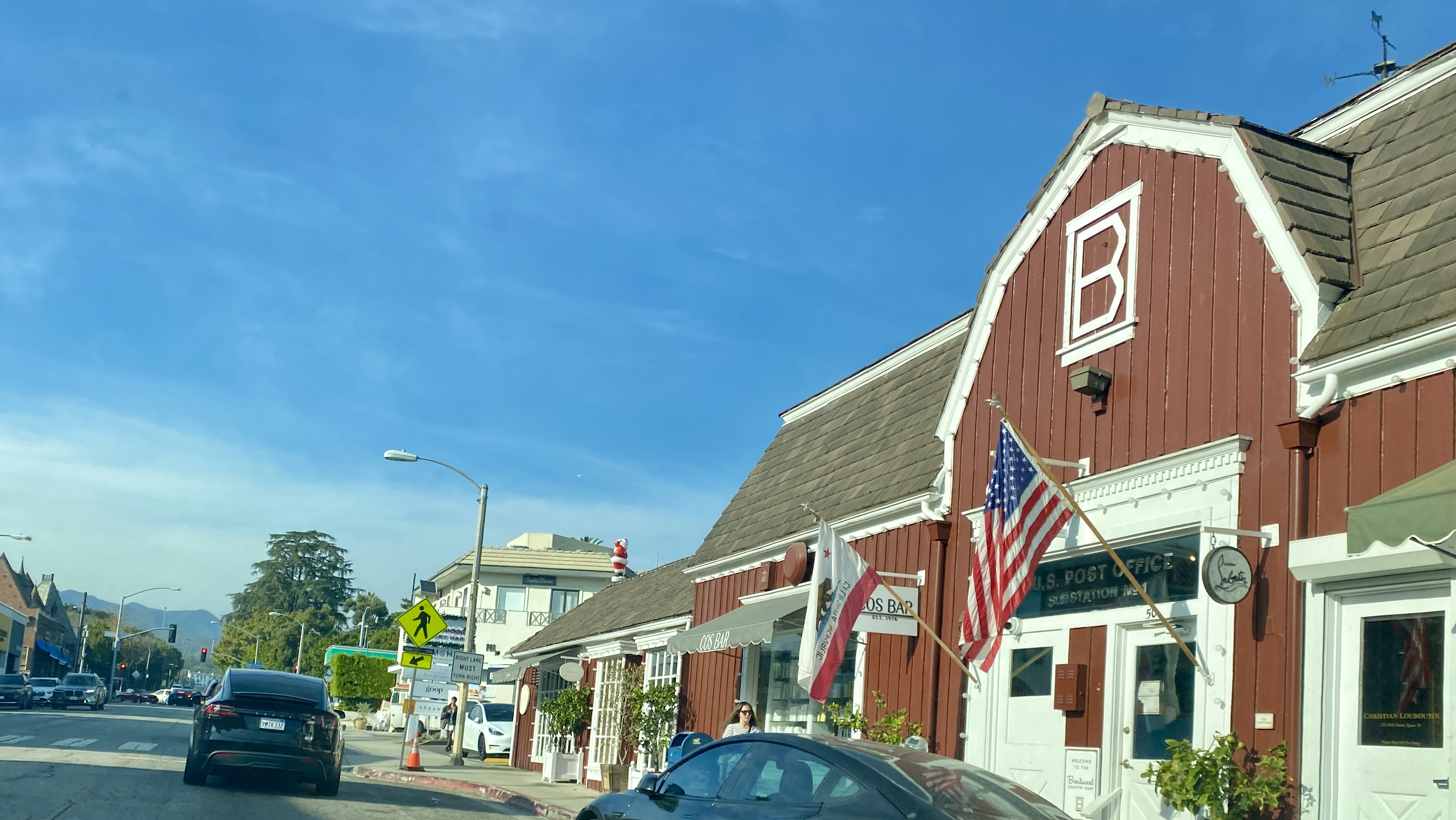
Brentwood Country Mart

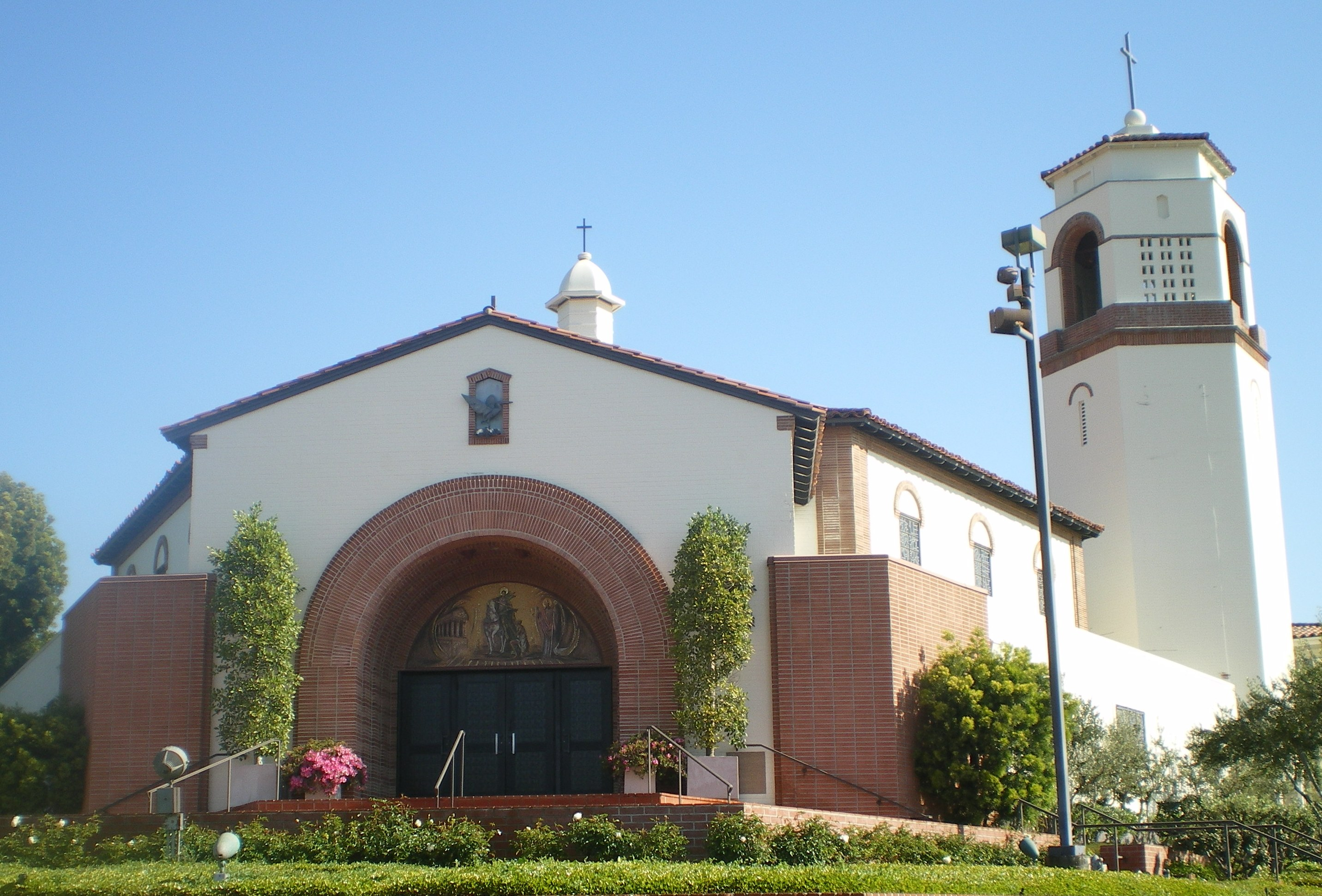
St. Martin of Tours Catholic Church, 11967 Sunset Boulevard

San Vicente Boulevard is divided by a wide median on which stand many large coral trees. This green belt replaced a Pacific Electric trolley track, and the trees have been named a City of Los Angeles Historic-Cultural Monument.

Brentwood features a number of residential sub-districts:

- Brentwood Circle: a gated community east of Barrington and north of Sunset that was created when the Getty Museum was built.
- Brentwood Glen: an area bounded by Sunset, the 405 Freeway, and the Veterans Administration, it is an enclave of small lots and single family homes
- Bundy Canyon: home to Mount St. Mary's College and an emergency ingress entrance to Getty Center (though the latter is accessible only from Sepulveda for the public)
- Crestwood Hills: includes a cluster of protected, architecturally significant mid-century modern residences located in the northern part of Kenter Canyon
- Mandeville Canyon: westernmost part of Brentwood, north of Sunset; extends about three miles to the north and is the longest dead end street in the City of Los Angeles.
- Sullivan Canyon: a mostly equestrian neighborhood with a private riding ring.
- The "Polo Field": situated at Will Rogers State Park near Paul Revere Middle School and the Riviera Golf Club
- Brentwood Park: large estates located in a zone bordered by Oakmont, San Vicente, Allenford and Cliffwood Drive.
- Brentwood Terrace: Located between the Brentwood Country Mart and Brentwood Country Club

Each sub-district is represented by a different homeowners association.

== Recreation ==
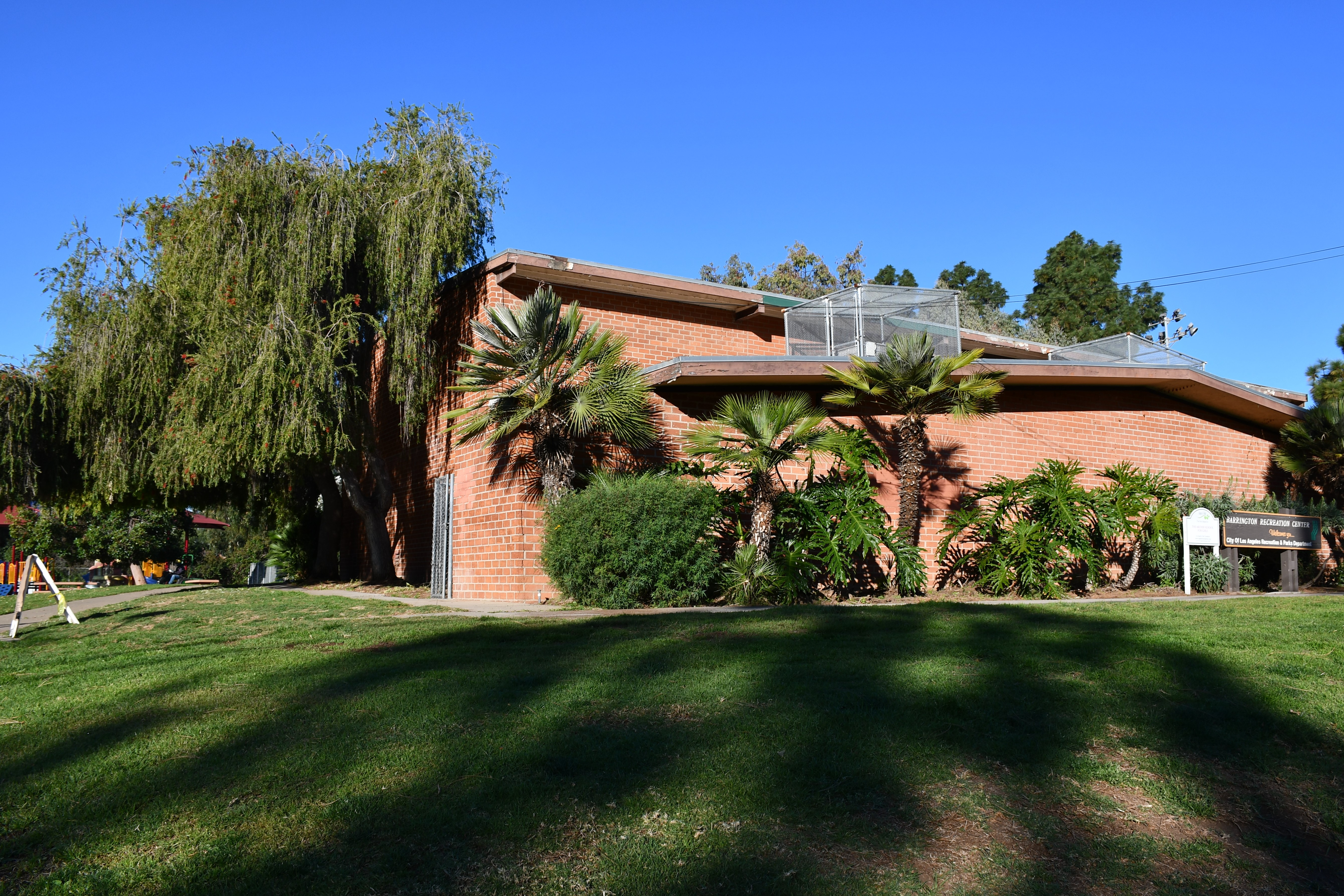
Barrington Recreation Center

Brentwood's Barrington Recreation Center has an indoor gymnasium which converts into a small auditorium with a capacity of 250. Outdoors is a lighted baseball diamond, an unlighted baseball diamond, lighted indoor basketball courts, lighted outdoor basketball courts, a children's play area, picnic tables and lighted tennis courts. As of March 2018, Barrington Park received a grade of "D" from the Los Angeles Parks and Recreation Department due its poor facilities; upon investigation, the Brentwood Community Council discovered $1.1 million in missing funds that were supposed to be used for capital upgrades at the park and successfully fought the city for their return. With the funds back in place, the Community has worked to improve the park. The Barrington Dog Park is across the street from the recreation center and is part of Barrington Veterans Park, which is owned by the West LA VA and leased to the City of Los Angeles.

== Economy and businesses ==
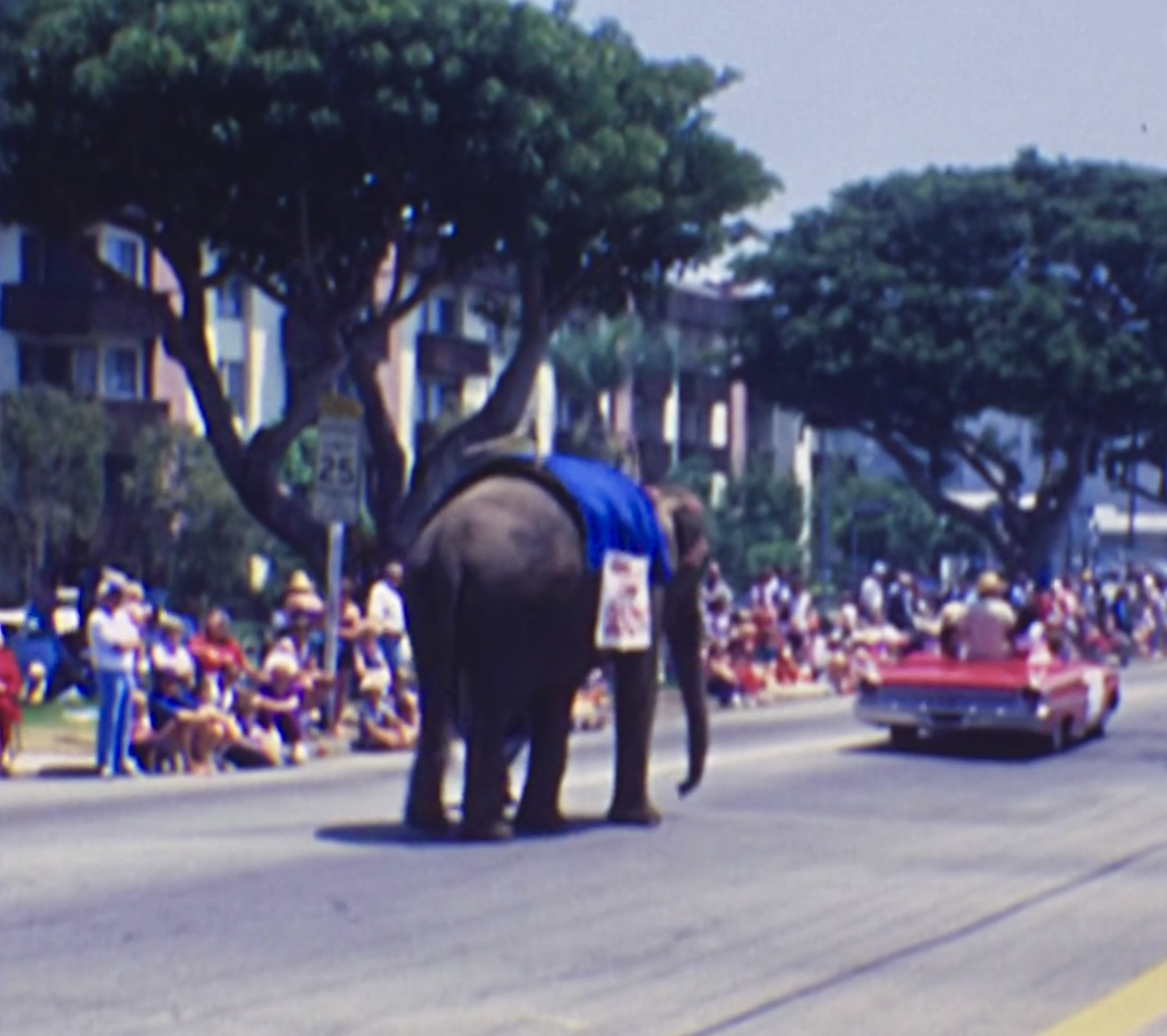
Brentwood businesses hosted an annual Memorial Day parade in the 1970s and 1980s

Chevron station on Sunset Boulevard, Brentwood, Los Angeles, photographed by John Margolies in 1977

The vast majority of office space in Brentwood is rented to professional services firms: accountants, lawyers, medical care.

There are three upscale commercial areas: Brentwood Country Mart, Barrington Plaza and the San Vicente Business District, which include restaurants, clothing stores, and other high-end retailers.

Brent-Air Pharmacy, run by the founding Lassoff family from its inception until June 2007, served Brentwood for more than 50 years. The drug store has been the scene of many famous scandals and, like its defunct West Hollywood cousin Schwab's, is known as the pharmacy to the stars, where many now-notable actors and actresses worked as delivery boys or "candy counter" girls.

The Brentwood Country Mart, near the corner of San Vicente Boulevard and 26th Street next to the Santa Monica city limit, is a shopping and food center that first opened in 1948.

Vicente Foods is an independently owned and operated grocery market that has served Brentwood since 1948. Other local markets include Whole Foods and Ralphs.

A popular area for dining and coffee for local residents is located in Brentwood Village at the intersection of Barrington and Sunset. More than a dozen restaurants and coffee shops are located within a two-block stretch offering a wide variety of cuisine.

Dutton's Brentwood Books, a local landmark called by Sunset magazine "the last of the truly independent bookstores", closed its doors in April 2008.

== Government and infrastructure ==
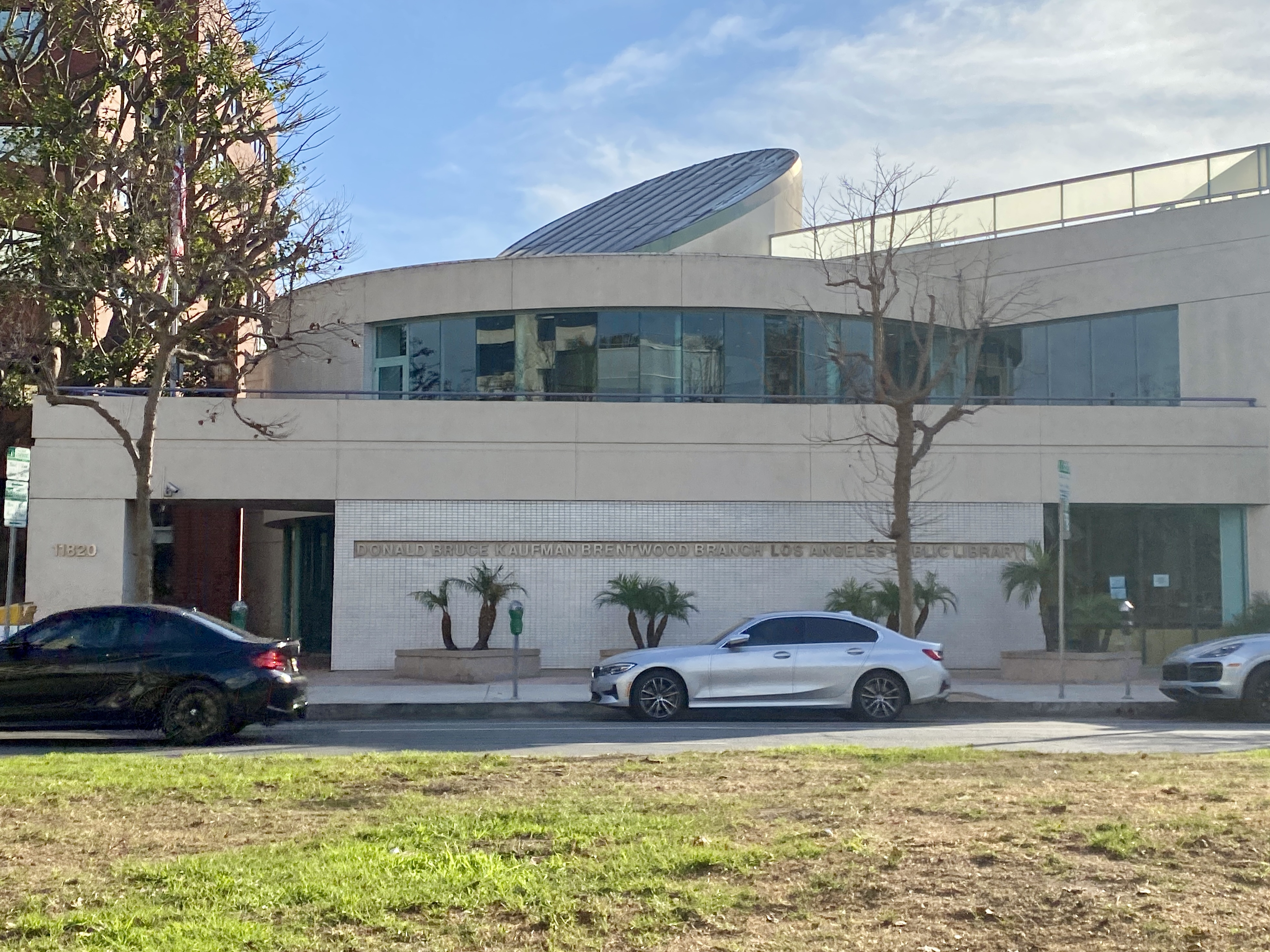
Donald Bruce Kaufman - Brentwood Branch Library, 11820 San Vicente Boulevard Los Angeles, CA 90049

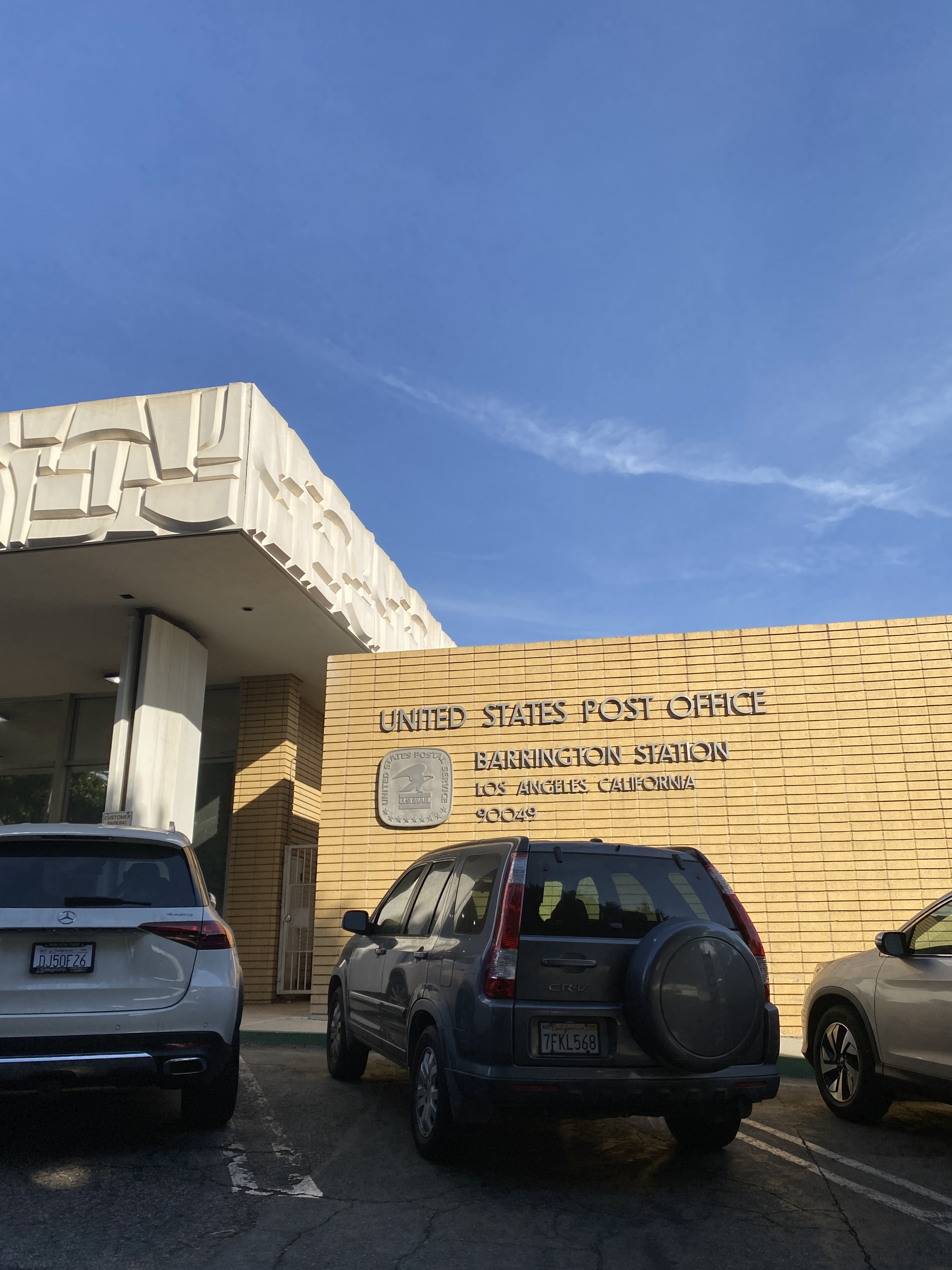
Barrington Station, U.S. post office

=== Brentwood leadership and city services ===
Brentwood and Pacific Palisades both chose to form community councils in order to have an independent voice with regard to issues that impact their communities, such as their joint Community Plan, which is a City approved document that governs the aesthetics of zoning and design for the neighborhoods. The Brentwood Community Council holds monthly public meetings, as does its Land Use Committee, and has been a powerful and effective voice for the community since the 1990s. The BCC Board includes members from all local HOA's, plus members representing schools, business, environment, transportation, civic affairs and a group dedicated only to residents under 40, called Brentwood '49. City Services are provided by the Los Angeles Fire Department Station 19 in Brentwood. The Los Angeles Police Department operates the West Los Angeles Community Police Station in West Los Angeles, serving Brentwood. The City of Los Angeles Department of Water and Power provide utilities. All areas of Brentwood are served by a Residents Association of some kind.

=== West LA VA and VA Master Plan Redevelopment ===
While the annual County of Los Angeles homeless count rarely attributes more than 50 persons as homeless in Brentwood, the majority of the homeless persons are Veterans. While the VA does have available beds and treatment programs, many Veterans find it hard to take the first step to accept VA assistance for a variety of reasons, including deep mistrust of the VA, dishonorable discharges that prevent them from receiving services, the mandatory sober living environment on the VA campus. The Brentwood Community Council took the lead in 2013 to help establish Veteran safe parking and safe camping programs, which allow Veterans to take an 'intermediate step" between homelessness and accepting full VA assistance and these programs have been successful and have grown over time. Some Veterans believed the VA was derelict in its duty to provide housing and successfully sued the VA, proving that multiple leases of VA property had been used for fraudulent means. Several individuals went to prison, including a former VA executive. As a result of the settlement in the Veterans civil suit against the VA, the $1B VA Master Plan Redevelopment of the West LA VA property, including 2000+ units of housing, was approved by Congress in 2019 and was completed in late 2020.

=== County ===
The Los Angeles County Department of Health Services SPA 5 West Area Health Office serves Brentwood. The Supervisor for this area is Lindsey Horvath.

=== State ===
Brentwood is represented in the California State Senate by Ben Allen and in the California State Assembly by Richard Bloom.

=== Federal ===
The United States Postal Service operates the Barrington Post Office in Brentwood. Brad Sherman represents the area in the U.S. House of Representatives.

== Education ==
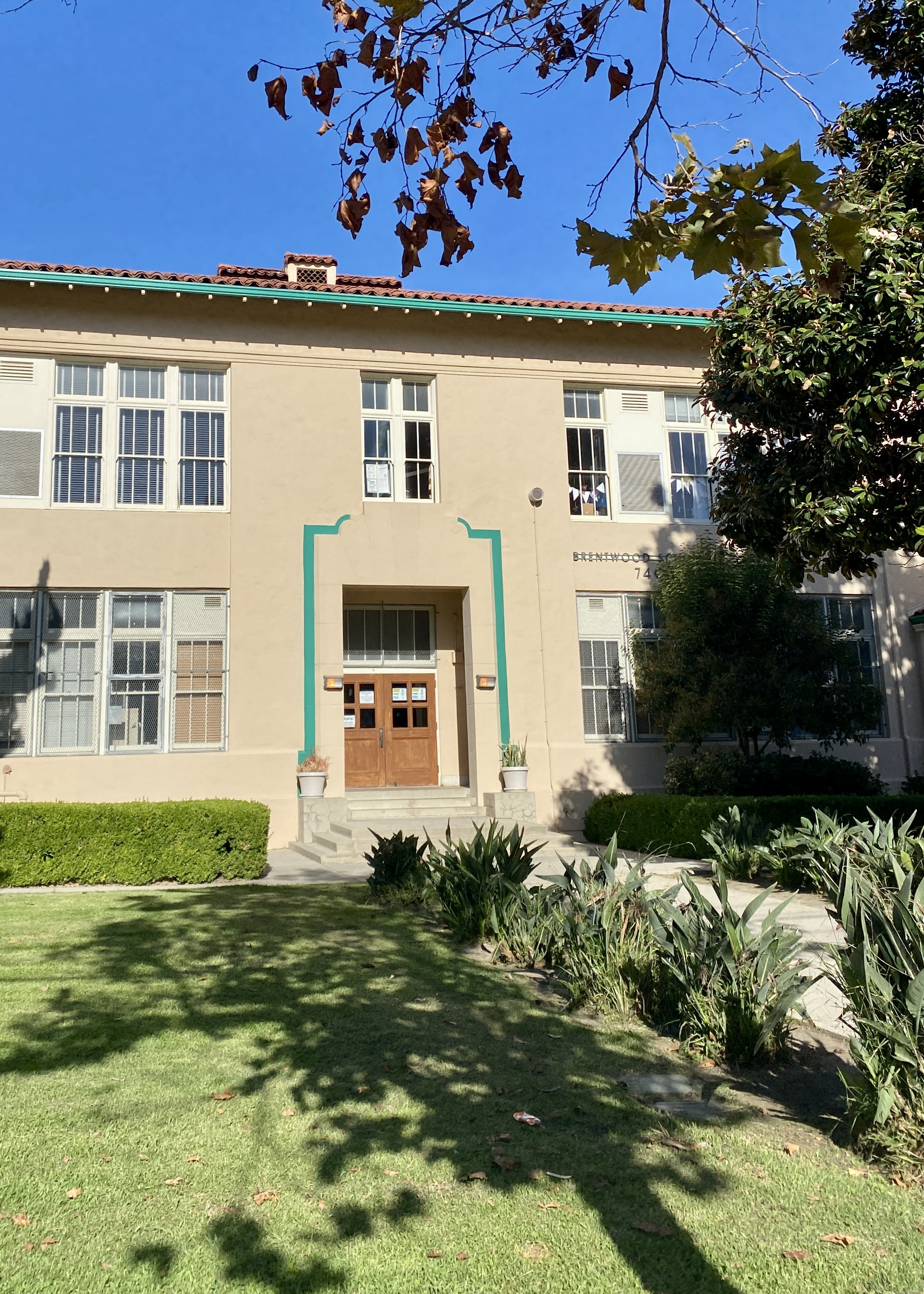
Brentwood Science Magnet Elementary School

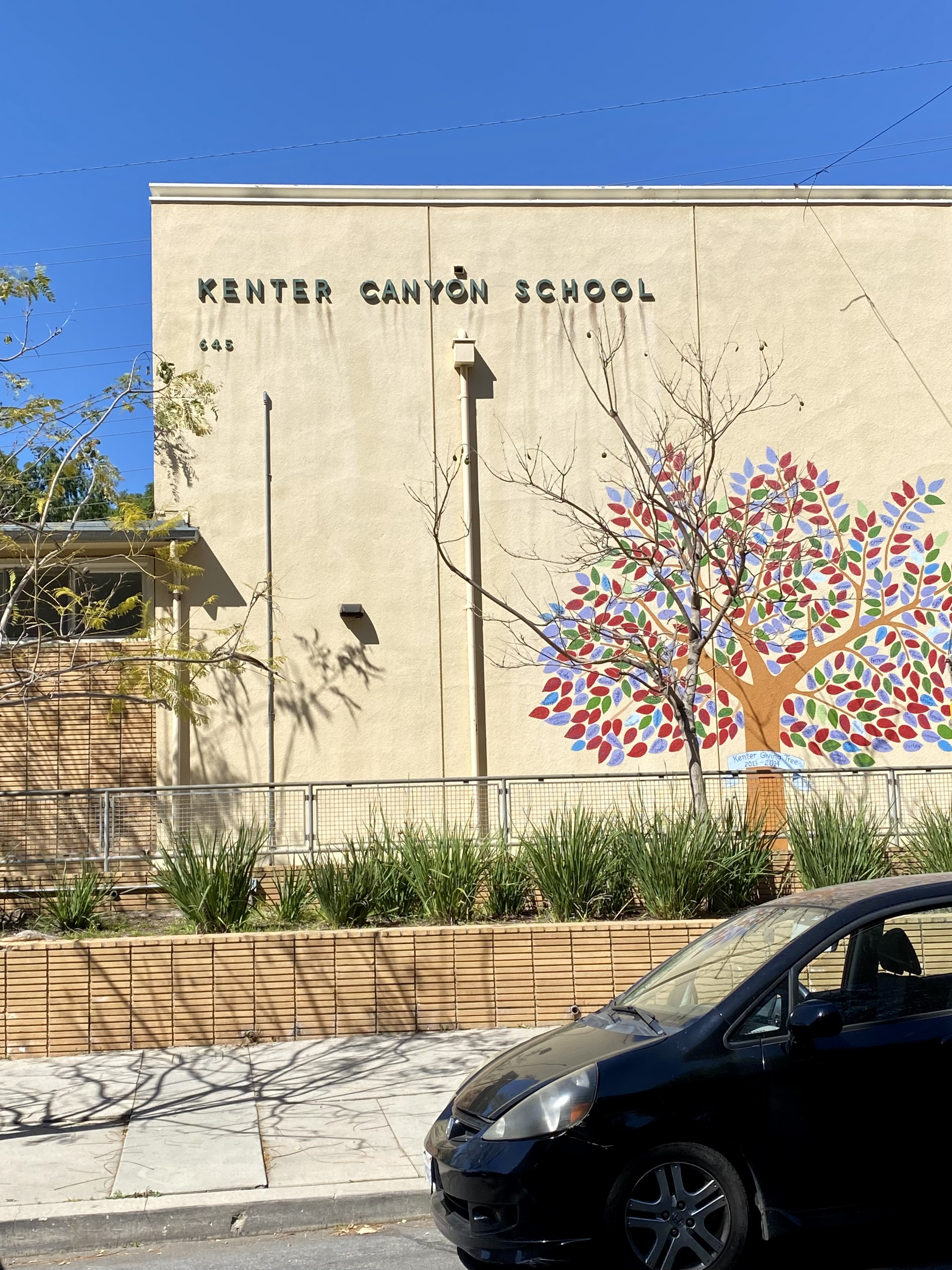
Kenter Canyon Elementary School

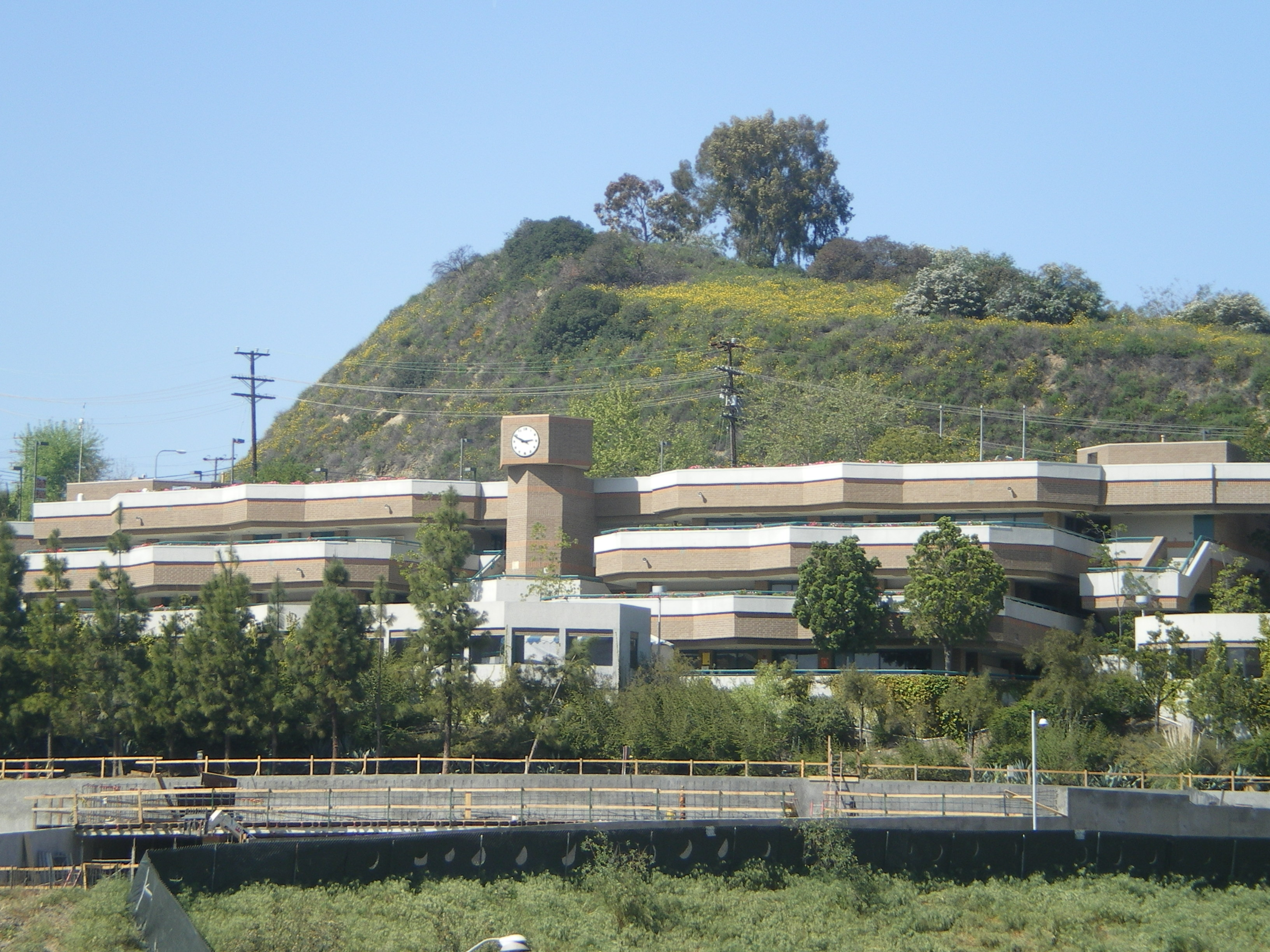
Milken Community High School, 2008

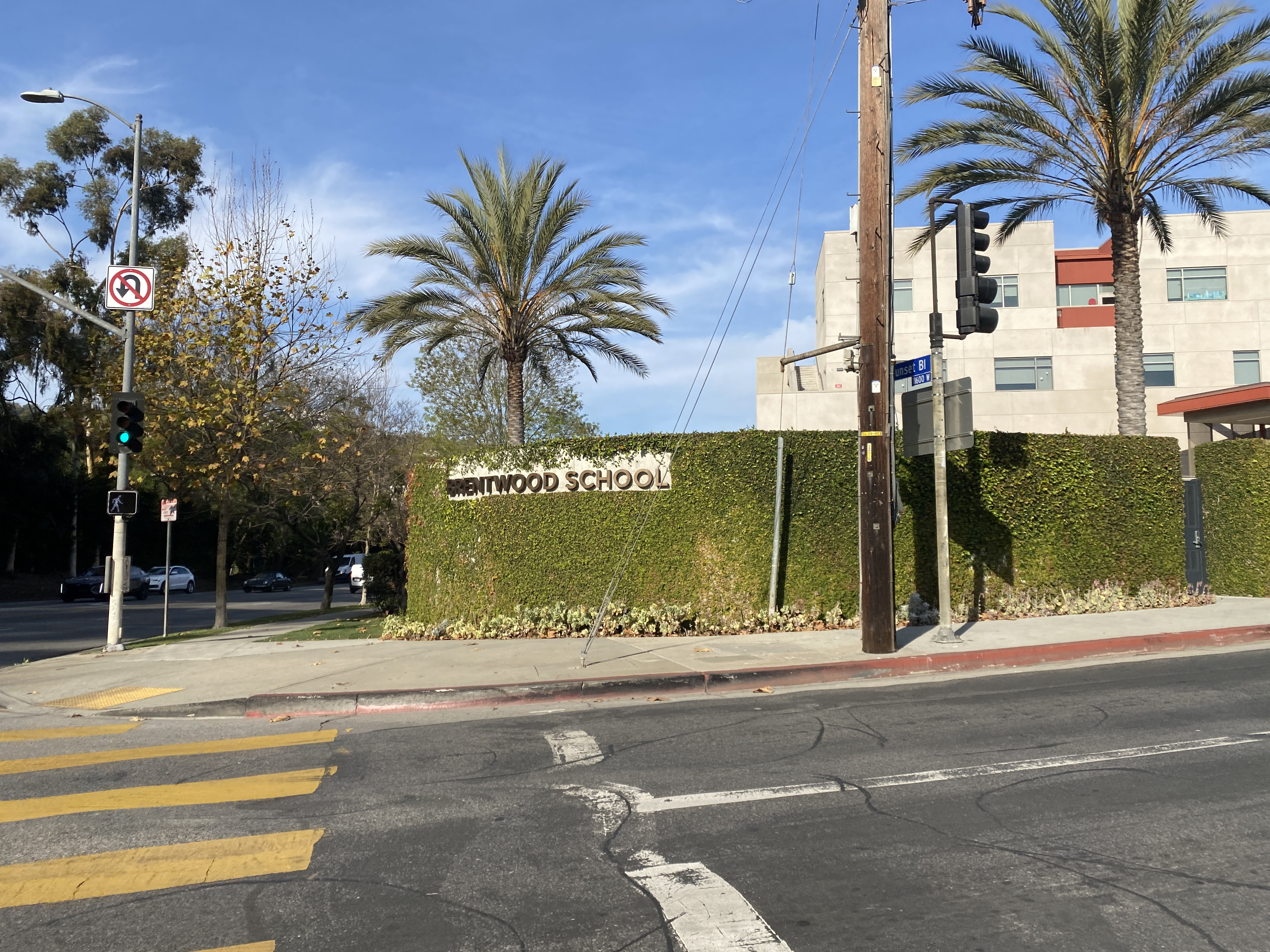
Brentwood School

Seventy percent of Brentwood residents aged 25 and older had earned a four-year degree by 2000, a high percentage for the city and the county. The percentages of residents in that age range with a bachelor's degree or greater were high for the county.

=== Primary and secondary education ===
Schools within the Brentwood borders are as follows:

The public elementary schools in the area are Kenter Canyon Elementary School (an LAUSD charter school) and Brentwood Science Magnet Elementary School (an LAUSD alternative school). Paul Revere Charter Middle School is Brentwood's public middle school. High school students are zoned to University High School in West Los Angeles, and Palisades Charter High School, in the nearby neighborhood of Pacific Palisades.

The following private schools are located in the Brentwood area:

- Westland School, elementary
- The Mirman School
- Berkeley Hall School, elementary
- Milken Community High School
- Brentwood School, K–12
- Archer School for Girls
- Saint Martin of Tours School, elementary

=== Public libraries ===
Los Angeles Public Library operates the Donald Bruce Kaufman - Brentwood Branch Library.

== Notable people ==
- James Arness, actor (1923–2011)
- Bea Arthur, actress (1922–2009)
- David Baerwald, musician
- Tom Brady, National Football League quarterback
- Andrew Breitbart, author, commentator and website publisher (1969–2012)
- Eli Broad, businessman, investor and philanthropist (1933–2021)
- Gisele Bündchen, model and entrepreneur
- Chad Smith, drummer for the Red Hot Chili Peppers
- John Candy, actor, comedian (1950–1994)
- Dee Caruso, screenwriter and producer (1929–2012)
- Mickey Cohen, gangster (1913–1976)
- Dabney Coleman, actor (1932–2024)
- Bert Convy, actor, game show host, singer and panelist (1933–1991)
- Joan Crawford, actress
- Stephen W. Cunningham, UCLA graduate manager and Los Angeles City Council member (1886–1956)
- Don DeFore, actor (1913–1993)
- Joan Didion, writer (1934–2021)
- Dr. Dre, rapper, record producer, and entrepreneur
- John Gregory Dunne, writer (1932–2003)
- Dane Elkins (born 1999), professional racquetball player
- Henry Fonda, actor
- Glenn Frey, musician, co-founder of the rock band Eagles (1948–2016)
- James Garner, actor, star of Maverick and The Rockford Files
- Ronald Goldman, murder victim and restaurant waiter
- Mark Harmon, actor
- Kamala Harris, former Vice President of the United States, California Attorney General, and senator
- Leland Hayward, entertainment industry agent and producer (1902–1971)
- Arianna Huffington, author
- Bob Iger, CEO of The Walt Disney Company
- LeBron James, National Basketball Association player
- Norman Lear, writer and producer
- Monica Lewinsky, activist, television personality, fashion designer, and former White House intern
- Robert Loggia, actor (1930–2015)
- Lea Michele, actress
- Marilyn Monroe, actress (1926–1962)
- Alanis Morissette, musician
- Richard and Pat Nixon, former US President and First Lady
- Conan O'Brien, television talk show host, comedian
- Catherine Anne O'Hara, Canadian and American actress (1954 - 2026)
- Gwyneth Paltrow, actress, entrepreneur
- Wolfgang Petersen, German film director, producer and screenwriter (1941–2022)
- Gregor Piatigorsky, cellist (1903–1976)
- Rob Reiner, director, producer, writer, and actor (1947–2025)
- Faye Resnick, reality TV personality
- Bob Saget, actor and comedian (1956–2022)
- Jill St. John, actress
- Arnold Schoenberg, composer
- Arnold Schwarzenegger, actor, bodybuilder, former governor of California
- Nicole Brown Simpson, ex-wife of O.J. Simpson (1959–1994)
- O. J. Simpson, football player, actor (1947–2024)
- Maria Shriver, journalist, author, former first lady of California
- Oliver Stone, director, screenwriter
- Margaret Sullavan, actress
- Robert Taylor, actor (1911–1969)
- Heather Thomas, actress
- Robert Wagner, actor
- Reese Witherspoon, actress
- Betty White, actress (1922–2021)

== See also ==
- List of districts and neighborhoods in Los Angeles
- Killing of Rob and Michele Singer Reiner
