= Palisades Village =

Shopping mall in Pacific Palisades, California

Palisades Village is a local shopping village located in Pacific Palisades, California, in the downtown area of the neighborhood known as the "Village", from which the shopping center derives its name. It was developed by Rick Caruso and opened in September 2018. It closed after the Palisades Fire in January 2025 and reopened in August 2026.

The outdoor shopping center was designed to look like a typical American main street with smaller storefronts and mid- to high-end boutiques. The majority of the stores are small chains and are women-owned. After the fire, many new stores that were brought in had previously operated in other spaces in the Palisades.

== History ==
=== Background ===
When members of the Chautauqua movement first developed the new community of Pacific Palisades in 1923, they placed a small park in the heart of the village, later known as the village green, and commissioned the Olmsted Brothers architecture firm to design the village and business center that would serve as the downtown area for the new community. The business district of the Palisades was centered around the historic Business Block building located between Antioch and Sunset.

=== Development ===
Just a few years ago it was said that Pacific Palisades' tiny commercial center had the beaten-down aura of a Midwestern Main Street where the mom-and-pop shops have been driven out by Walmart — only there was no Walmart. "It was a little village with one or two streets of stores and restaurants," said actor Billy Crystal, who moved there with his family in 1979. "Over the years it sort of faded and faded." — Roger Vincent, Los Angeles Times

Palisades Village was developed by Rick Caruso in the 2010s to revitalize the commercial district, which had been described as "run-down". Retailers such as Trader Joe's, Whole Foods, and what would have been the first Los Angeles location of San Francisco-based chain Bi-Rite Market were under consideration to open in the village. The development received its final approval from the city on June 21, 2016, allowing demolition work along Swarthmore Avenue to proceed and construction work to begin. Los Angeles City Councilman Mike Bonin, who represented the neighborhood, said at the time that Palisades Village "will revitalize downtown Palisades and give the neighborhood the thriving community center it deserves." Construction took more than two years and cost more than $200 million.

=== Grand opening ===
In March 2018, Amazon Books confirmed rumors that they would open their second Los Angeles location in Palisades Village. This was the first bookstore to open in the Palisades since local mainstay Village Books closed in 2011 after 14 years of operation.

On September 20, 2018, a black-tie gala was held to celebrate the grand opening of Palisades Village. Notable people in attendance included John Legend, Charlize Thereon, Mindy Kaling, Michael Keaton, Jon M. Chu, Rita Wilson, Molly Sims, Kate Beckinsale, and Rachel Zoe.

=== 2019–2024 ===
On August 15, 2019, Amazon Studios organized an event at Palisades Village to promote their series The Marvelous Mrs. Maisel. Businesses in the village offered promotional items for "1959 prices" for one day only until they ran out of supply. Hank's sold Reuben sandwiches for $0.85 each, and McConnell's ice cream shop sold a single scoop of ice cream for $0.25.

=== 2025 fire and closure ===
In January 2025, the Palisades Fire destroyed much of downtown. Palisades Village itself was not damaged, but closed; in May 2025, it was announced that it was expected to reopen in summer 2026 after extensive repairs and renovations to the center and the surrounding buildings. Elyse Walker announced that she would relocate her flagship elysewalker store there.

Most of the stores closed permanently after choosing not to return, but several new ones arrived, including stores that were located elsewhere in the Palisades prior to the fire.

=== 2026 Reopening - Present ===
The Palisades Village officially reopened on August 15th, 2026, to a grand celebration and concert featuring several guest celebrities. After the fire, the village expanded its footprint with a martial arts studio replacing the Pearl Dragon Restaurant, and the old Paliskates building becoming a temporary parkette until rebuilding begins. In October, it was announced that Paramount would be taking over the Bay Theater, previously operated by Netflix.

== Design ==
Each building in Palisades Village was designed by a different architect, so that no two buildings adjacent to each other looked alike, as in a longstanding downtown shopping district. As part of the design process, the design team traveled to some of the nation's most pedestrianized city streets, including Fillmore Street in San Francisco and Newbury Street in Boston, in order to study storefront depths, widths, frontage, and architecture mix. They drew from their surroundings of "The Village" neighborhood of the Palisades' 'California Coastal' architecture to create a shopping village lined with landscaped balconies and open patios. All the walkways and paths in Palisades Village are paved with brick pavers, which is a first in the Los Angeles area. The street lamps used in the village were inspired by those Caruso saw during his travels in St. Tropez. A residential architect was hired to design the façades of residence-facing storefronts.

== Sustainability ==
Palisades Village was the "first LEED Gold certified ground-up business district" in California. During construction of the complex, 120,000 cubic yards of soil were repurposed for a canyon stabilizing project that became the George Wolfberg Park. The parking garage uses all-LED lighting, which reduces energy by 90 percent, and also features charging for 30 electric cars, with the potential to scale this up to 100. Permavoid and biofiltration systems to drain storm water, purify it for later use and store it under the village green make the development's water use extremely small. A village-wide solar array generates about 800,000 watts of power that goes back into the local power grid every day.

== Services ==
Prior to the COVID-19 pandemic, Palisades Village had a bike share project that let shoppers and residents borrow bicycles, as well as a concierge program to deliver packages to homes or cars.

== Village green ==
The Village Green is a small privately owned park located at 15280 Sunset Boulevard, between Swarthmore and Antioch Avenues in the center of Palisades Village. It has benches, a fountain, and a lawn, and is supported solely by donations and maintained by volunteers. The park is lined with trees and has 77 different tree and plant species to help alleviate concerns about light and noise pollution. It also hosts community events. In 2019, the Allied Artists of the Santa Monica Mountains and Seashore hosted a landscape art sale and exhibition featuring local artists at the green.

The Village Green is on the site of the original public park founded in 1923, which in 1945 was leased to Standard Oil for use as a gas station. Some local residents campaigned for years for the restoration of the park. The Pacific Palisades Chamber of Commerce contacted Standard Oil in 1968 and began to negotiate closure of the filling station and restoration of the park upon the expiration of the lease for the property in June 1972. The 15-member Pacific Palisades Community Council established a 5-person subgroup called "The Village Green Committee" to work on restoration of the park. The committee signed a lease giving them the option to buy the lot if sufficient funds could be raised. The fundraising drive began on October 1, 1972, and in less than three months raised almost $70,000.

Of the funds raised, $46,000 was used towards the purchase of the village green and the rest paid for hiring an architect to design the park. The basic idea of the Green was that it should be a place to be enjoyed from within and admired from a distance. This meant walkways, benches, trees and flowers, as well as grass. There was to be a flag pole, water feature, and a drinking fountain; however, the project ran over budget and the fountain was not installed until 1990.

The Village Green Committee was formally certified as a California non-profit corporation in 1973. The Palisades Village Green was formally dedicated and opened to the public on August 17, 1973. The Village Green Committee had originally planned to hand over ownership of the Village Green to the City of Los Angeles when it was finished due to the legal responsibility and cost of maintenance involved. However the committee eventually decided to retain their ownership of the property. The park remains owned by the Village Green Committee and managed by a volunteer Board of Directors made up of members of the community. The Palisades Village was developed around the Village Green and it is now surrounded by storefronts that are a part of the shopping district.

== Dining ==
As of October 2026, the following restaurants and eateries have a location in the Palisades Village:

Dining
Alfred Coffee
The Bay Theatre by Paramount (Opening soon)
Blue Ribbon Sushi
Carla Cafe (Opening April 2026)
Erewhon Market
Alphabet
Ueki Omakasse by Blue Ribbon
McConnell's Fine Ice Creams
Angelini
Porta Via
K bakery
Fast Times Coffee (Inside Buck Mason)
Spacca Tutto

== Former tenants ==
Most of the Palisades Village stores closed after the Palisades fire in 2025, but several also closed prior.

=== General Porpoise ===
General Porpoise, a Seattle-based doughnut shop operated by chef Renee Erickson and offering sufganiyot, jelly doughnuts, and other filled doughnuts with fillings such as its signature roasted lemon curd doughnut, opened its first location outside the Seattle area in the Palisades Village on opening day. Little more than six months after opening, General Porpoise closed its doors on March 26, 2019, after lower than expected sales.

- The Draycott
- Serena and Lily
- Alo
- Village Optometry
- Madewell
- Frame
- Vince
- Little Market
- Amazon Books
- Eres
- Saint Laurent
- Lululemon
- Sweet Laurel Bakery
- William B
- Favorite Daughter
- Madhapy
- Gornick and Drucker Barbers
- Vintage Grocers
- Sephora
- Chanel
- Faherty
- Bottega Veneta
- St. Frank
- Carbon38
- Cynthia Rowley
- Bonjour fete
- Tamara Mellon
- Flannel
- Sees Candies
- Edo Little Bites
- Hanks
- Bay Theater (under Cinepolis and under Netflix)
- Que Padre

== Celebrity sightings ==
Since opening, Adam Sandler, Jennifer Garner, John Legend, Kevin Nealon, Billy Crystal, and Kate Beckinsale have been spotted shopping there, among others.

== See also ==
- Brentwood Country Mart
- The Grove at the Original Farmer's Market
- Rodeo Drive
- The Americana at Brand
- Westfield Century City
