= Rowland Crawford =

American architect

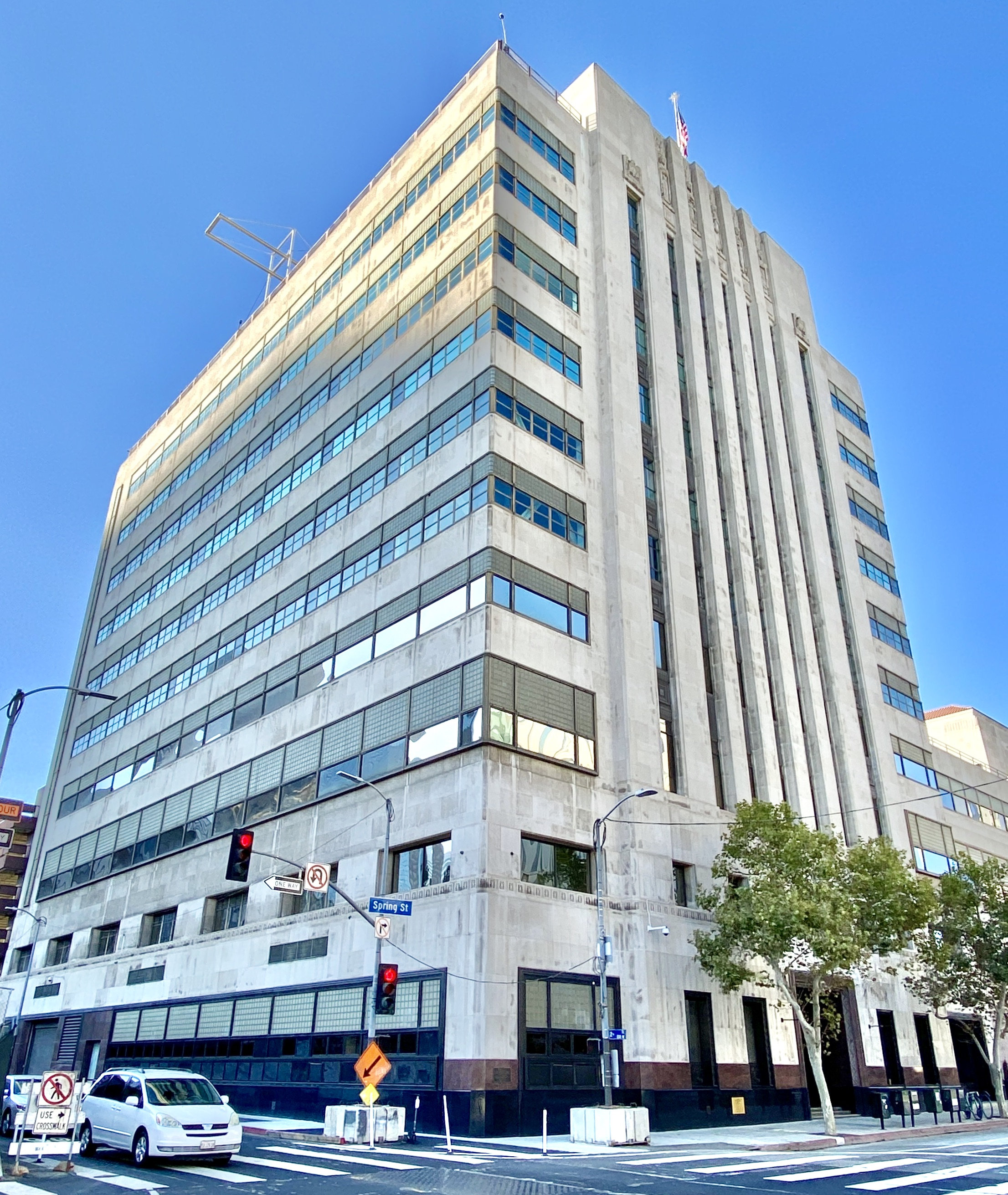
Crawford designed the Mirror Building (1948) to complement the Los Angeles Times Building (1935), designed by Gordon Kaufmann. Crawford was a protégé of Kaufmann and had served as chief architect on the earlier building.

Rowland Henry Crawford (1902–1973) was an American architect and artist. Most of his buildings are located in the Los Angeles metro area.

== Biography ==
Rowland Crawford was born October 28, 1902, in Deadwood, South Dakota. He attended the University of Southern California from 1920 to 1923, and was a member of its first architecture class. From 1924 to 1925, he attended the University of Pennsylvania. Following a two-year scholarship at the American Academy in Rome, where he studied painting, he returned to Los Angeles to join the architectural firm of Webber & Spaulding, designers of the Avalon Casino on Santa Catalina and the Harold Lloyd Estate.

In 1930, he moved to the firm of Gordon B. Kaufmann. While there, he served as the chief architect for two well-known projects; the Los Angeles Times Building and the Santa Anita Race Track. He established his own firm in Beverly Hills in 1938. His better-known projects include the Sears Department Store in Santa Monica (1947), The Beverly Hills Law Building (1947), The Brentwood Country Mart (1948), the El Rancho Shopping Center in Arcadia (1955), remodeling the Hollywood Brown Derby (1960s) and major additions to Beverly Hills High School (1967–1970). One of his last projects was Crenshaw High School (1968).

In addition to his design work, he was in charge of master planning for the Beverly Hills Board of Education, served on the Bel-air Architectural Supervisory Committee (with over ten years as chairman), the Westwood Architectural Supervisory Committee and the Los Angeles Chamber of Commerce Construction Industries Committee. He also was the founder and first president of the University of Southern California’s Architectural Guild.
