= Times Mirror Square =

Complex of buildings in Los Angeles

Los Angeles Times Building at Times Mirror Square
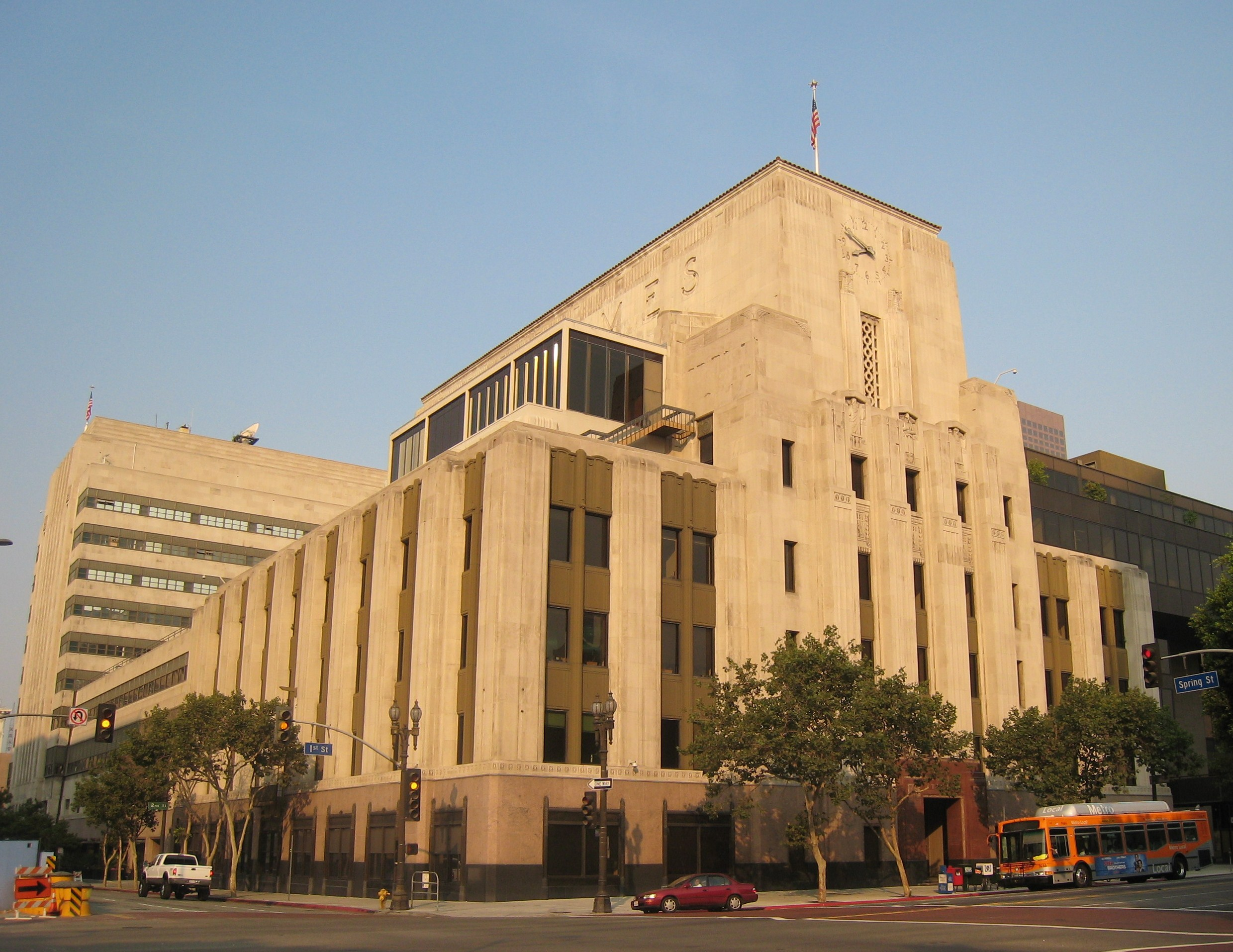
- The Los Angeles Times Building at the southwest corner of First and Spring streets, part of the Times Mirror Square complex
- Interactive map of the Los Angeles Times Building at Times Mirror Square area

General information
- Type: Office
- Location: 202 West 1st Street; Los Angeles, California; United States
- Coordinates: 34.053009°N 118.244596°W
- Completed: 1935
- Owner: Onni Group

Design and construction
- Architect: Gordon B. Kaufmann

Times Mirror Square is a complex of buildings on the block bounded by Spring, Broadway, First and Second streets in the Civic Center district of Downtown Los Angeles. It was headquarters of the Los Angeles Times until 2018. It is currently vacant, with plans being proposed regarding how to best utilize the existing buildings and the total ground area of the site.

== Components ==
Times Mirror Square includes:

1. The Los Angeles Times Building (or "Kaufmann Building") at the southwest corner of First and Spring Streets, opened in 1935. It was built as the headquarters of the Los Angeles Times and was designed in Art Deco style by Gordon B. Kaufmann. The building won a gold medal at the 1937 Paris Exposition. Harry Chandler, then the president and general manager of Times-Mirror Co., at its opening, declared the building a "monument to the progress of our city and Southern California".
2. The ten-story 1948 Mirror Building or Crawford Addition at the northwest corner of Second and Spring, designed by Rowland Crawford Site of the 1880s Nadeau Hotel and adjacent to its west, a building used as City Hall from 1884 to 1888.
3. The 1973 Pereira Addition, a six-story glass and steel structure on the southeast corner of First and Broadway, which was inaugurated as the headquarters of the Times Mirror Company. The International-style wing designed by William Pereira "recapitulates the geometric order and monumentality of the Kaufmann structure", according to the Los Angeles Conservancy.
4. A parking garage at the northeast corner of Second and Broadway

The parking garage at 213 S. Spring, stretching from the west side of Spring to the east side of Broadway between 2nd and 3rd streets, is sometimes referred to as the "Los Angeles Times Parking Garage", but is not actually part of Times Mirror Square. On both sides there are relief sculptures by Tony Sheets, Evolution of Printing and Evolution of Los Angeles, respectively, created in 1988–1989.

== In popular culture ==
The Times Mirror Square building appears in Season 2, Episode 5 of The L Word: Generation Q. It serves as the fictitious site of a LGBTQIA+ therapy office.

== Gallery ==
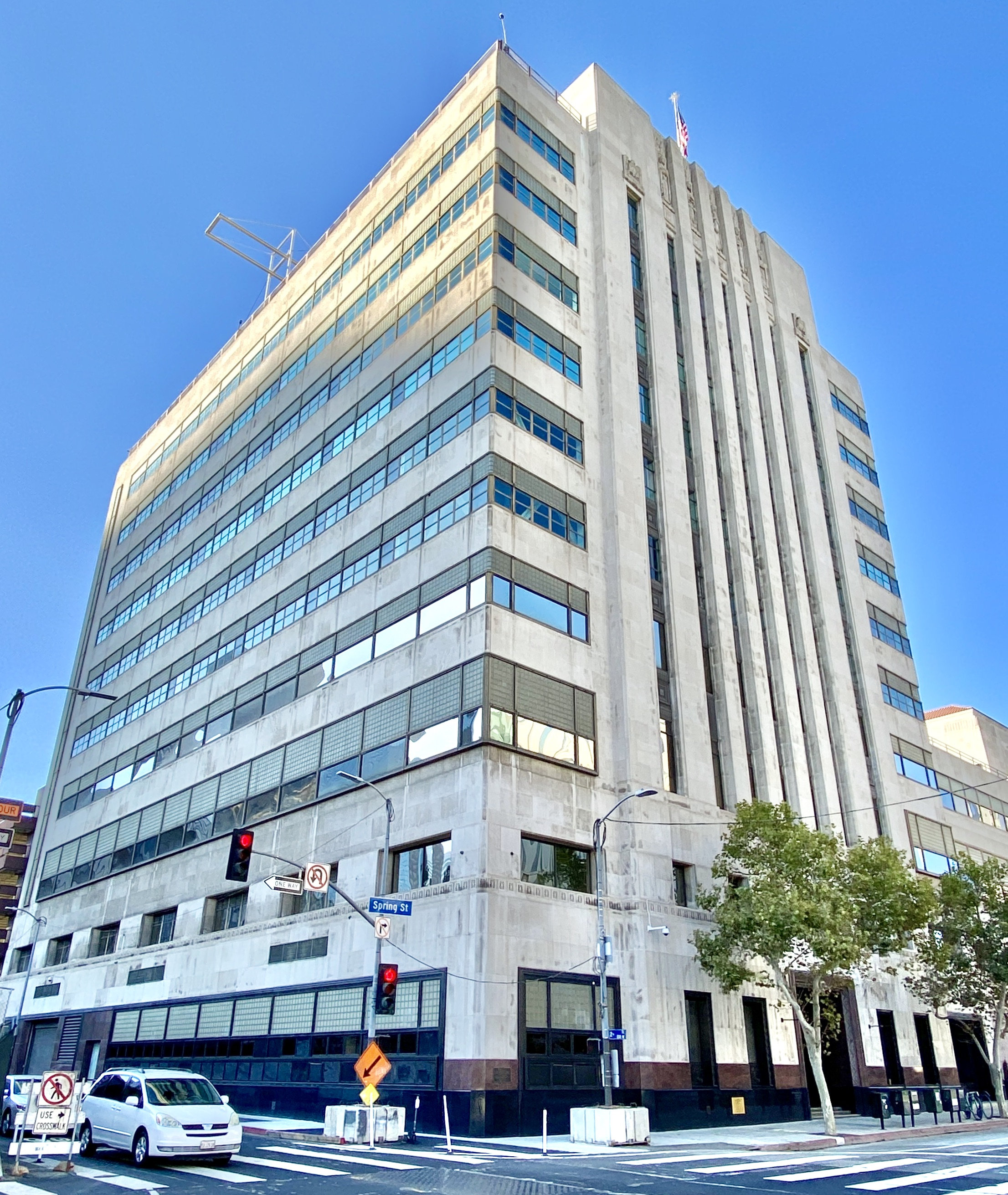
The 1948 "Crawford Addition" building at the SE of the complex, NW corner of 2nd & Spring, September 2020

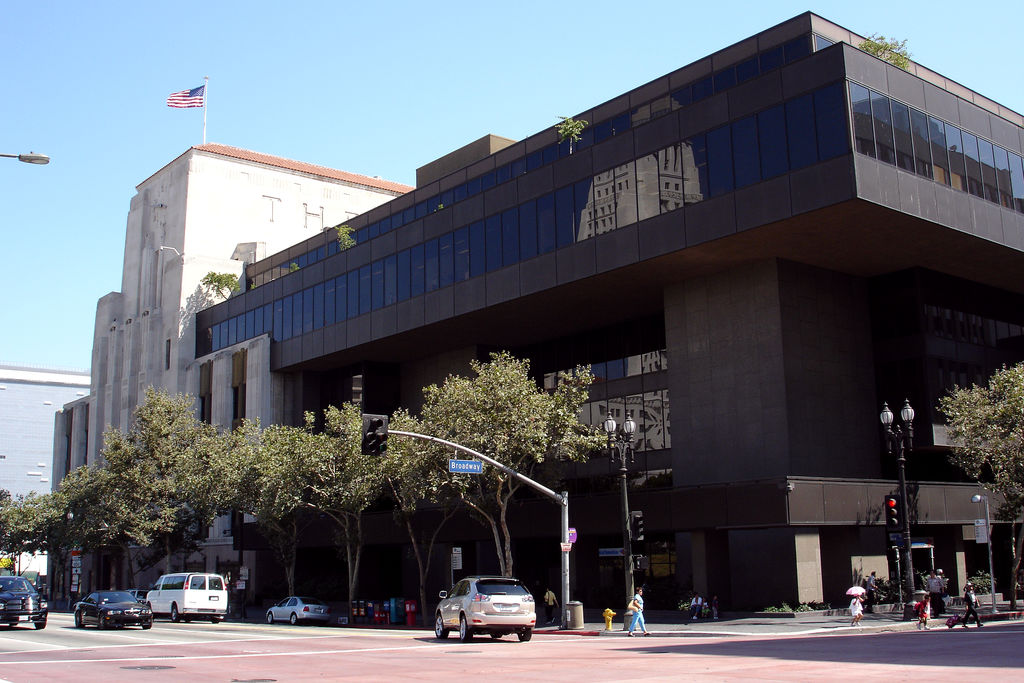
1973 Pereira Addition at the NW of the complex, SE corner 1st and Broadway

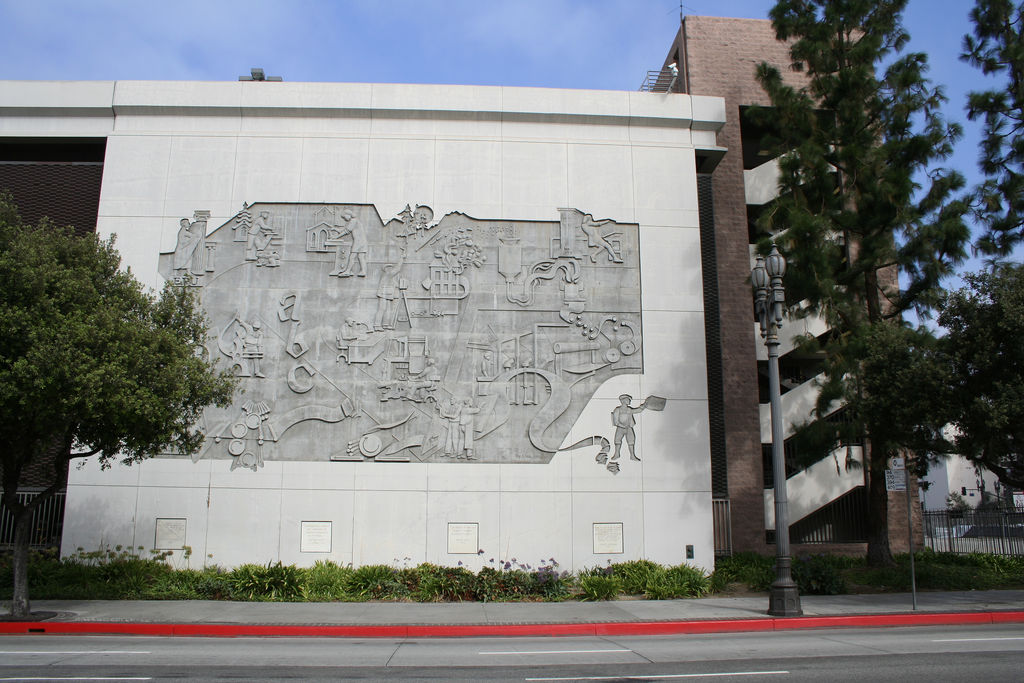
Relief sculpture Evolution of Printing by Tony Sheets on the Los Angeles Times parking garage at 213 S. Spring St., adjacent to Times Mirror Square on the south.

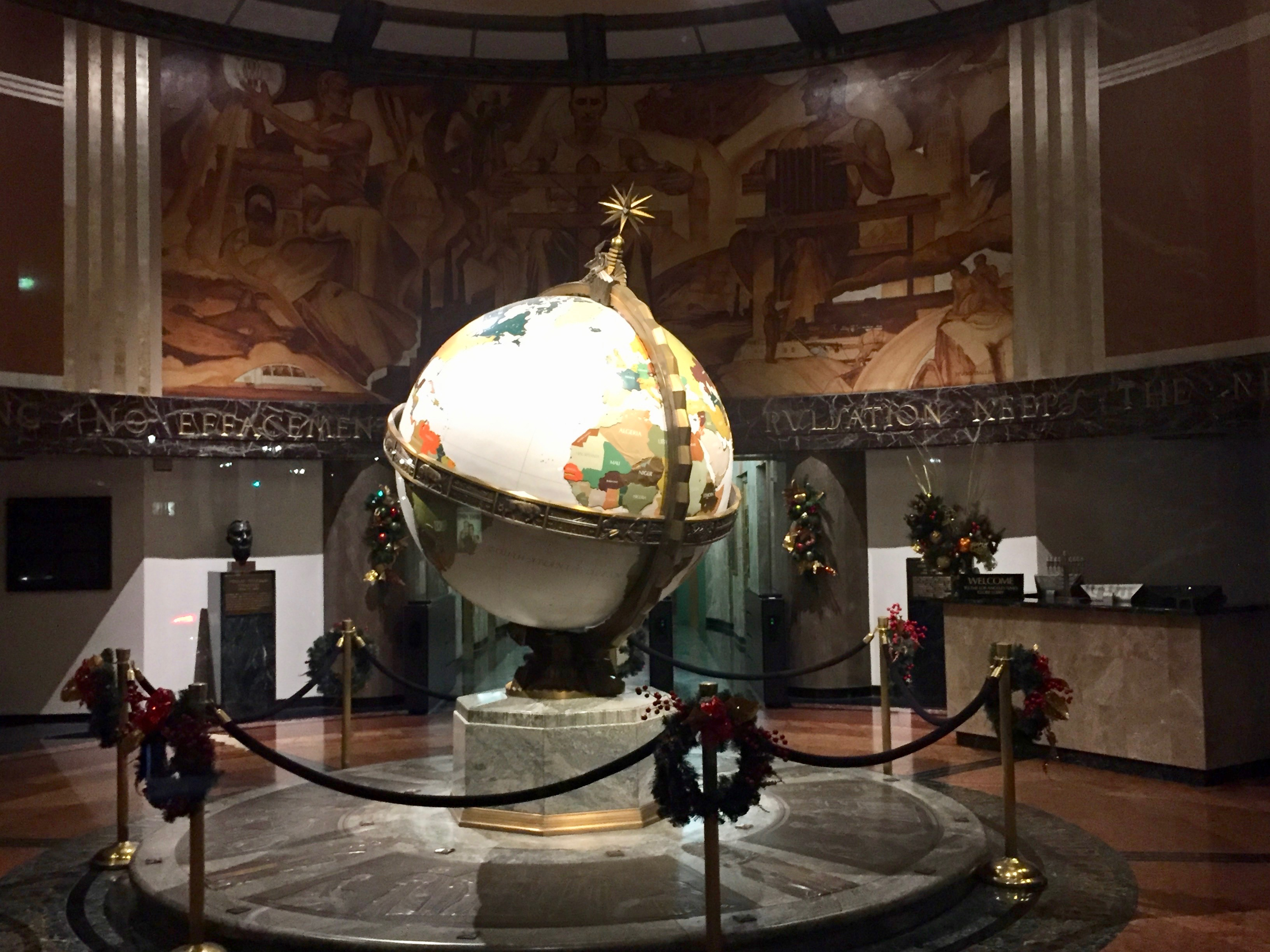
The famous globe lobby of the Times Mirror building.

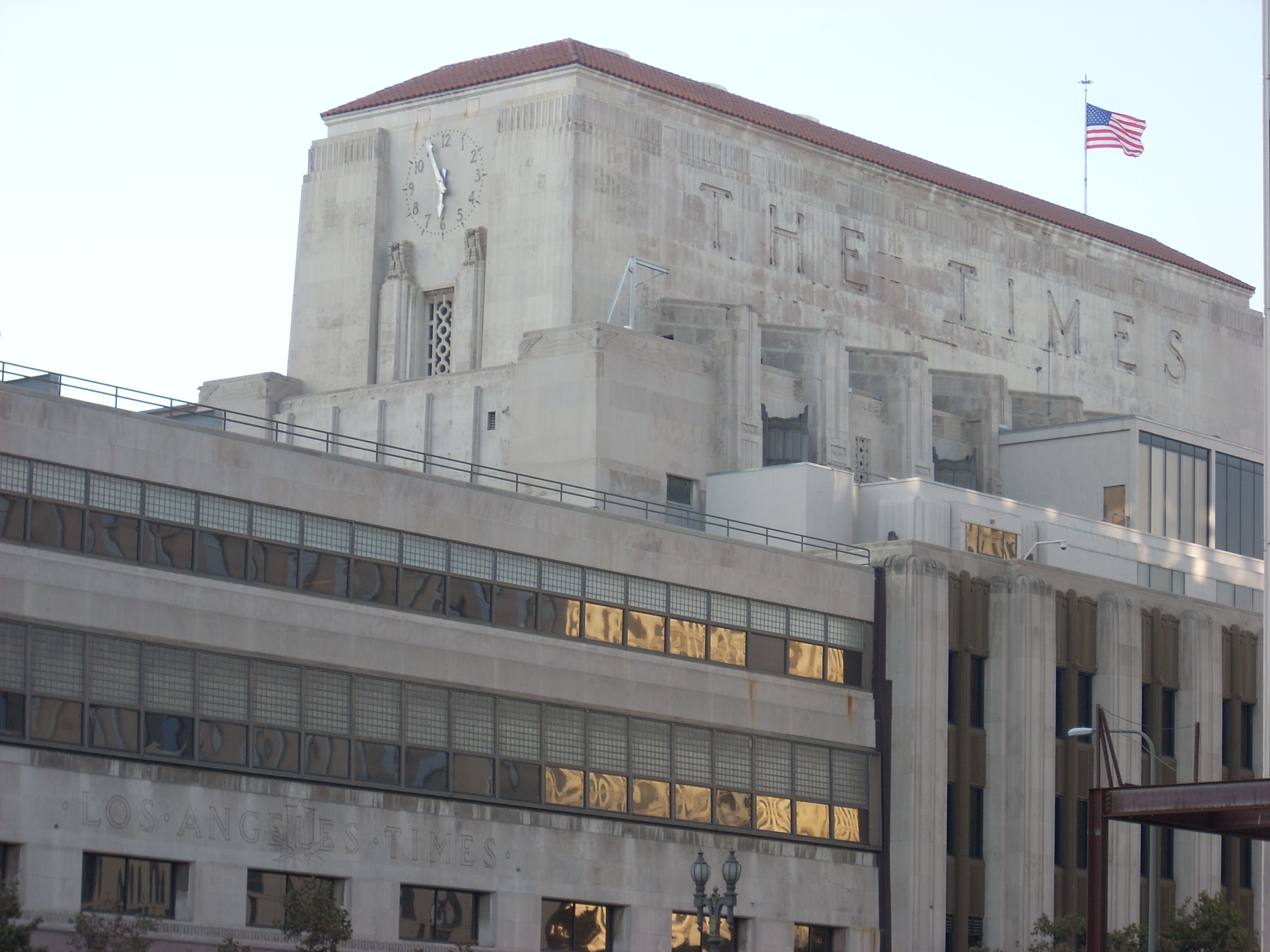
The Los Angeles Times Building

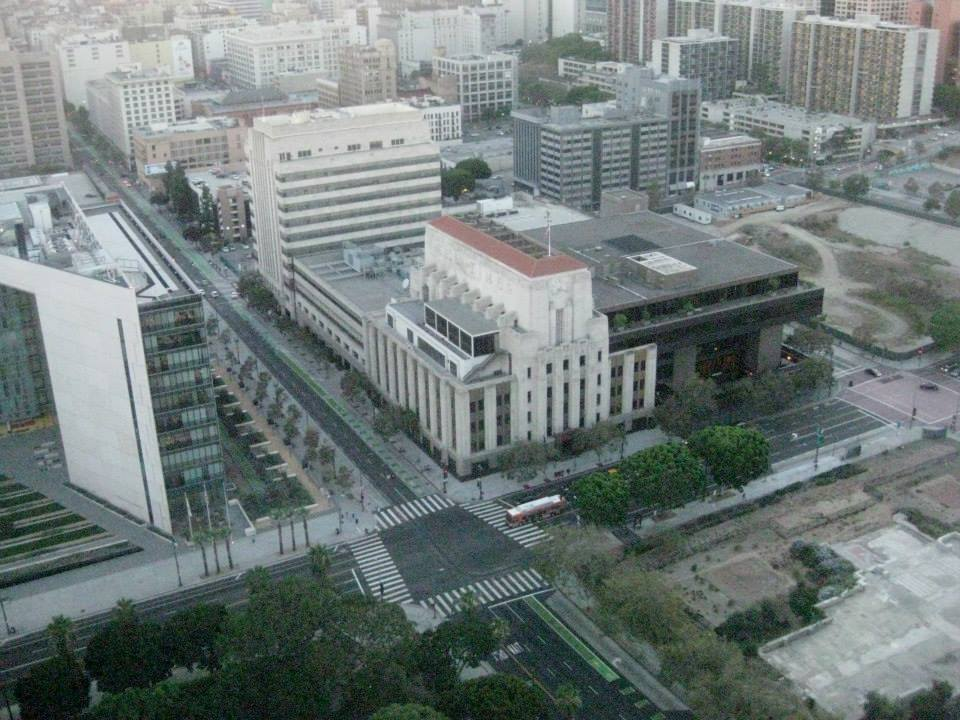
View of the Times Mirror complex from the L.A. City Hall observation deck.

== History ==
Times Mirror Square is located on a major portion of what was in the 1880s and 1890s, the central business district of Los Angeles.

On April 13, 2018, LA Times employees were notified that ownership was unable to reach a new lease agreement to remain in the Times Building. The staff of about 800 employees would relocate to a new campus under construction in suburban El Segundo, 17 miles (27 km) to the southwest when the lease at the Times Building expired on July 31, 2018.

Onni Group, a Canadian developer which became the owner after Tribune Publishing lost control of its real estate in bankruptcy reorganization, reportedly wanted to increase the monthly lease by $1 million. The new Times owner Patrick Soon-Shiong moved the paper to a building he owned in El Segundo, leaving the building empty.

The vacant building is currently underused, with vacant space being used for movie shoots, earning the company as much as $4 million one year. The original building, despite its historic and architectural significance, is not listed as a historical landmark. It is not in the listings of Los Angeles Historic-Cultural Monuments, California Historical Landmarks, or U.S. Registered Historic Landmarks in Los Angeles. Onni has planned to redevelop the site.

=== Redevelopment ===
In 2018, The Onni Group, a real estate development company, proposed to demolish the 1973 wing and replace it with residential units and retail. Two residential towers were proposed, a 37-story tower rising 365 feet and a taller 53-story building rising 655 feet. The plans includes 1,100 apartments with 24 moderate-income units and 10 low-income units. The design emphasizes walkability and retail around the Civic Center area of DTLA. Later in 2018, City Hall approved the demolition of all the additions to the original 1937 building, including the Pereira wing, to make way for the proposed towers.

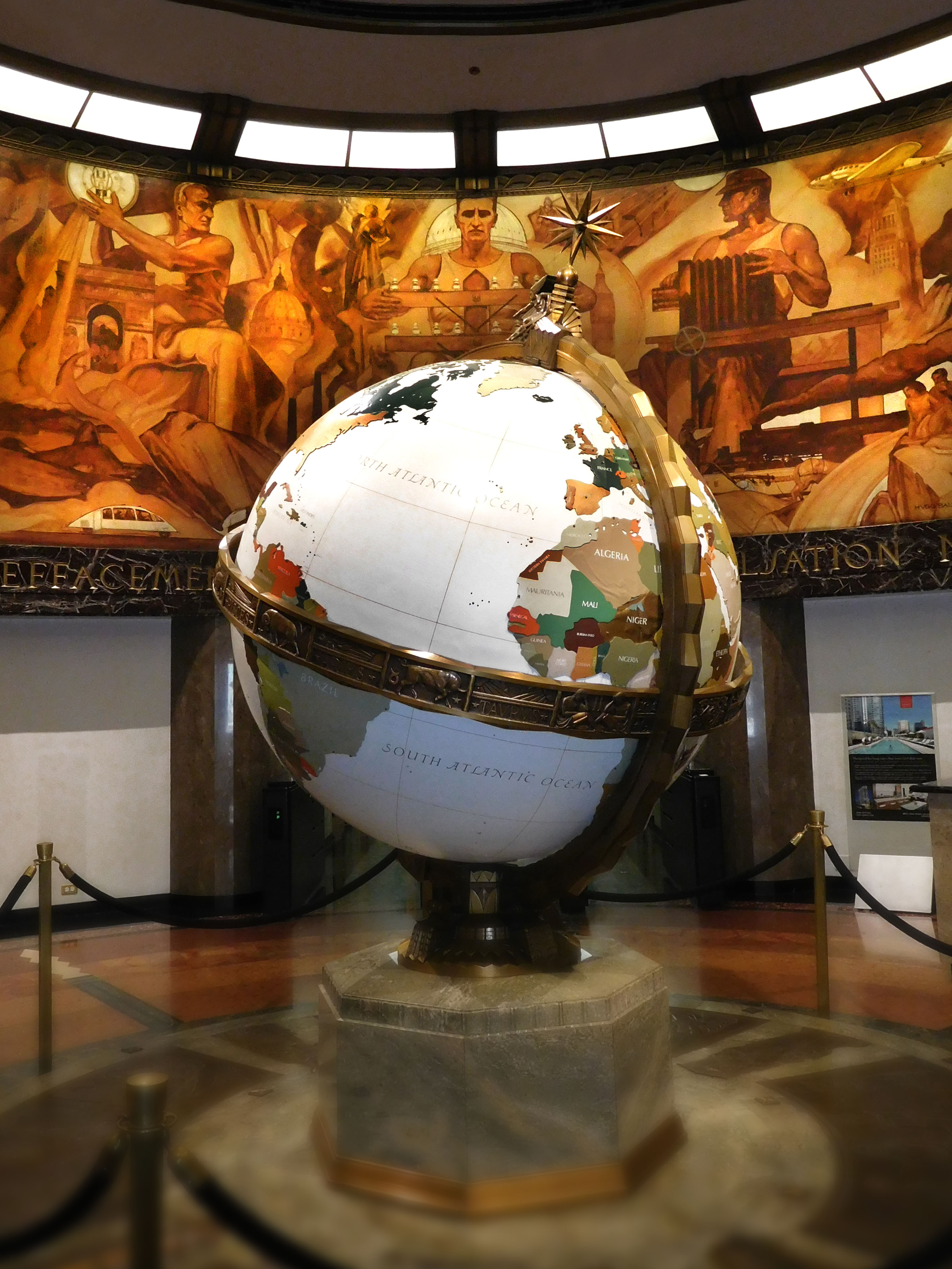
Lobby in the former Times building, 2018

The new underground Historic Broadway light rail station opened on June 16, 2023, on the 2nd Street side of the building, as part of the Regional Connector.

== See also ==
- Los Angeles Times bombing
- Los Angeles City Hall
- International Savings & Exchange Bank Building
- Hall of Justice
- Clara Shortridge Foltz Criminal Justice Center
