= East Hollywood, Los Angeles =

Neighborhood of Los Angeles, California

East Hollywood
- Neighborhood of Los Angeles
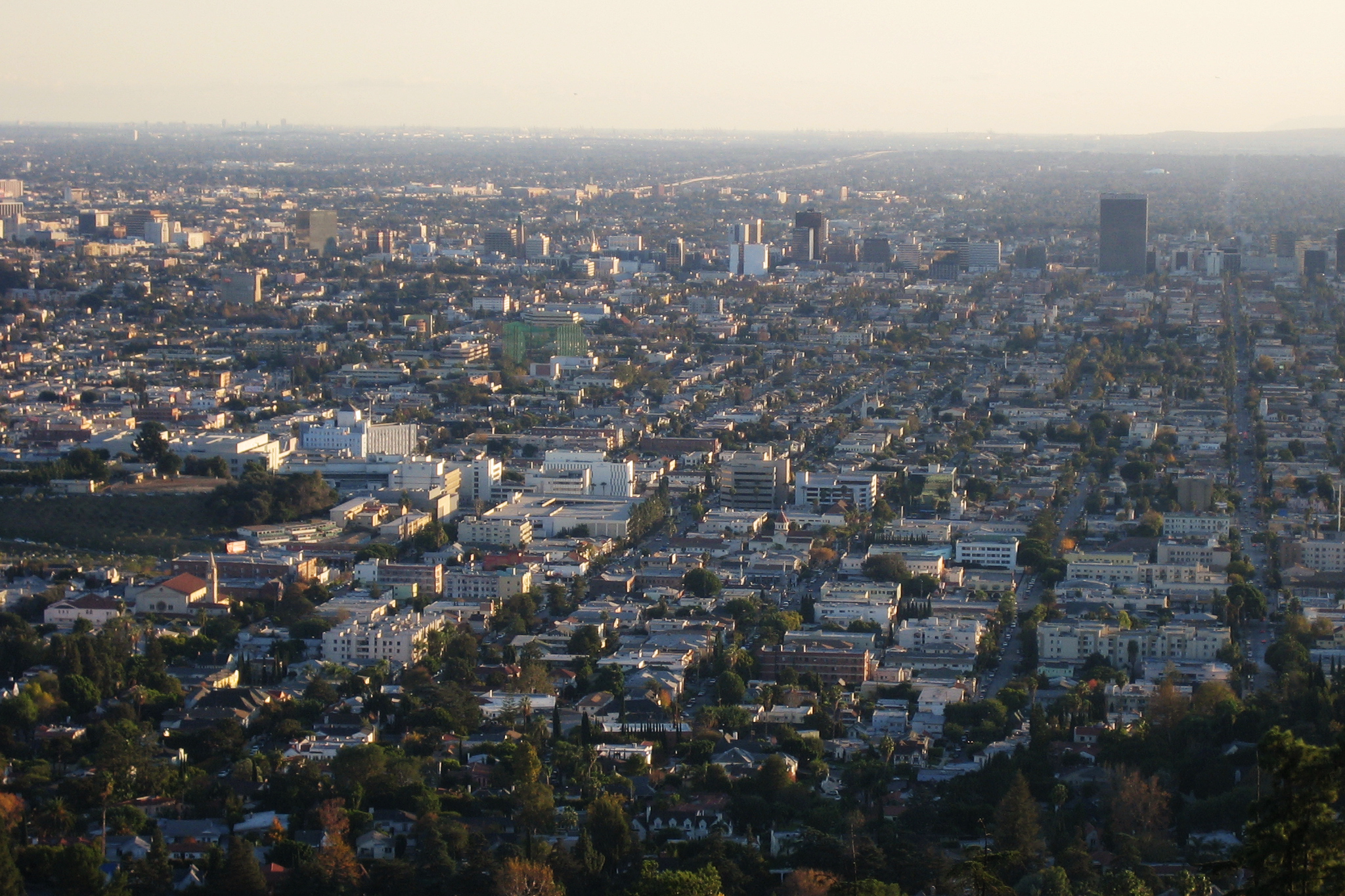
- East Hollywood as viewed from the Griffith Observatory

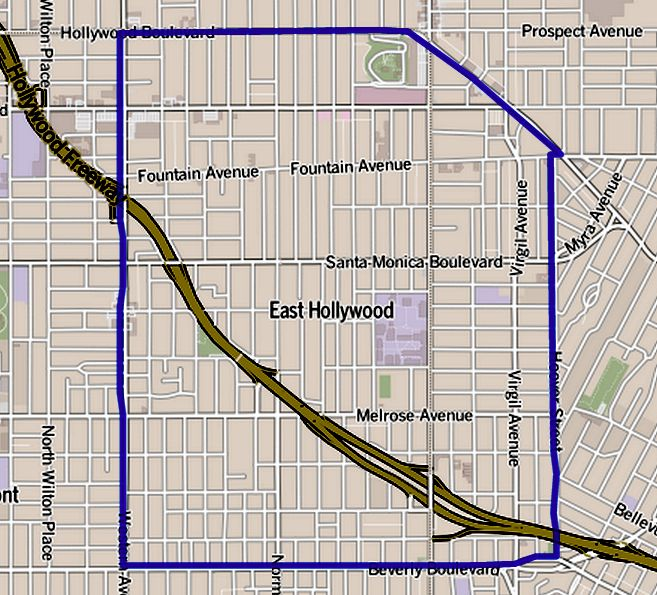
- Boundaries of East Hollywood as drawn by the Los Angeles Times

- Location within Central Los Angeles
- Coordinates: 34.090259°N 118.291927°W
- Country: United States
- State: California
- County: Los Angeles
- City: Los Angeles
- Named for: Location east of Hollywood
- Elevation: 338 ft (103 m)
- Time zone: UTC-8 (PST)
  - Summer (DST): UTC-7 (PDT)
- Zip codes: 90027, 90029
- Area codes: 213, 323

East Hollywood is a densely populated neighborhood with approximately 78,000 residents that is part of the Hollywood area of the central region of Los Angeles, California. Among sites in East Hollywood are Los Angeles City College, Barnsdall Art Park, seven public and five private schools; a Los Angeles Public Library branch, and three hospitals. Almost two-thirds of the people living there were born outside the United States and 90% are renters. According to the 2000 census, the neighborhood has high percentages of people who had never married and single parents.

== History ==
=== Spanish period ===
Sometime around his retirement in 1800, the Spanish government rewarded José Vicente Féliz, Comisionado of Los Ángeles, with the Rancho Los Feliz land grant. After Féliz's death in 1816, his family maintained control over the ranch.

=== Mexican period ===
In 1821, the Mexican War of Independence gave the Mexican Empire (which included California) independence from Spain. In 1822, the California's first legislature was formed, known as the Diputación de Alta California. The California mission system was secularized by 1834 and became the property of the Mexican government.

=== American period ===
==== Cession to America ====
With the cession of California to the United States following the Mexican-American War, the 1848 Treaty of Guadalupe Hidalgo provided that the land grants would be honored. As required by the California Land Act of 1851, a claim for Rancho Los Feliz was filed in 1852.

In 1863, the executor of Antonio Féliz's estate, Antonio F. Coronel, sold the land to San Francisco real estate developer James Lick.

In 1882, Griffith J. Griffith acquired 4,071 acres (16.5 km2) of Rancho Los Feliz. While much of this land eventually became Los Feliz and Griffith Park, the southwest portion of the rancho was developed as the Lick Tract in what later became known as East Hollywood.

Around 1890, Joseph H. Spires purchased 36-acre tract encompassing a round, flattened hill and created an olive orchard which came to be known as Olive Hill.

==== Annexation and growth ====
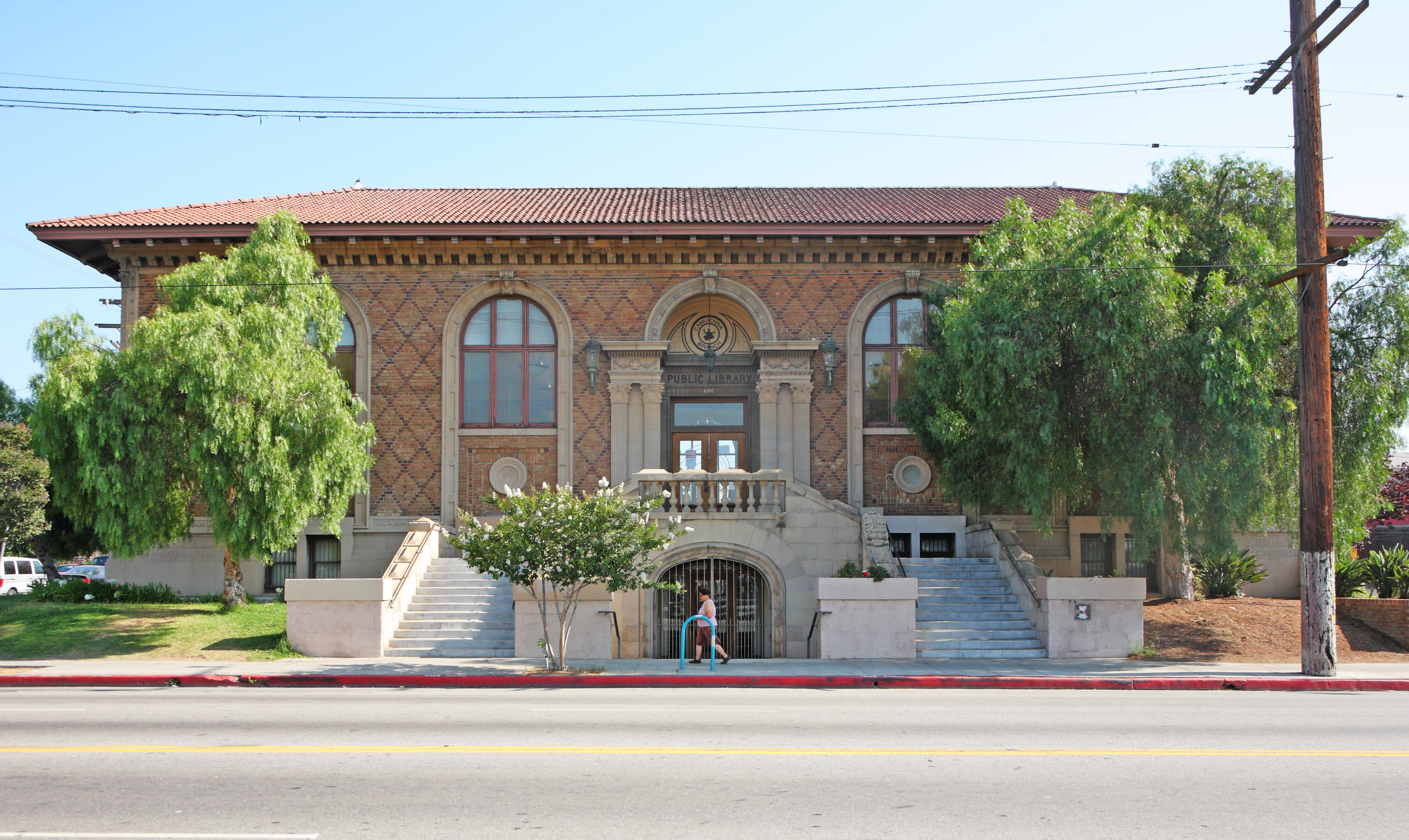
Cahuenga Branch, Los Angeles Public Library

In 1910, the towns of Hollywood and East Hollywood approved annexation by the City of Los Angeles. The 1910s saw the rapid development of East Hollywood, with the additions of Pacific Electric streetcars (1911), the California State Normal School (1914), Children’s Hospital of Los Angeles (1914), and the Cahuenga Branch Library (1916). In 1919, the California State Normal School campus became the Southern Branch of the University of California, which added its general undergraduate program, the College of Letters and Science.

In 1924, Hollywood Presbyterian Medical Center opened.

In 1926, oil heiress Aline Barnsdall donated Barnsdall Art Park and the Hollyhock House — located on Olive Hill — to the city for use as a public library.

In 1929, Southern Branch of the University of California moved to Westwood and the Vermont Boulevard campus became Los Angeles Junior College.

In 1930, Cedars of Lebanon Hospital was formed when Kaspare Cohn Hospital moved from East Los Angeles to a new building on Fountain Avenue.

==== Second World War and post-war development ====
Following the 1941 attack on Pearl Harbor by Japan, the neighborhood experienced a population exodus triggered by Executive Order 9066, which led to the internment of Japanese Americans.

Work was delayed by labor and material shortages caused by World War II, but construction of the Hollywood Freeway segment of U.S. Route 101 began in 1946 and was completed in 1954. The highway connected East Hollywood by car with the San Fernando Valley and Downtown Los Angeles.

In 1953, Kaiser Permanente opened a hospital on Sunset Boulevard.

Streetcar service of the neighborhood ended in 1954.

A Thai community formed in the area during the 1970s, with Thai language newspapers and numerous businesses. During the 1970s and 1980s, the neighborhood served as a "port of entry" for Armenian immigrants from Iran, Lebanon and the Soviet Union.

==== Recent history ====
In 1999, four Metro Red Line stations — Vermont/Beverly, Vermont/Santa Monica, Vermont/Sunset and Hollywood/Western — opened in the neighborhood.

In 1999 and 2000, respectively, portions of the neighborhood were officially designated Thai Town and Little Armenia.

Gentrification has rapidly changed the neighborhood in the 21st century, particularly in areas such as Melrose Hill and Virgil Village. There have been efforts to brand the neighborhood as "EaHo," in the style of West Hollywood's "WeHo" and North Hollywood's "NoHo."

== Demographics ==
The 2000 U.S. census counted 73,967 residents in the 2.38-square-mile East Hollywood neighborhood—or 31,095 people per square mile, the third-highest population density in the city. In 2008, the city estimated that the population had increased to 78,192 - or 32,853 people per square mile. In 2000 the median age for residents was 31, about average for city and county neighborhoods; the percentage of residents aged 19 to 34 was among the county's highest.

The neighborhood was "moderately diverse" ethnically within Los Angeles, the statistics being Latino people of any race, 60.4%; Asians, 15.5%; non-Hispanic Whites, 17.5%; blacks, 2.4%; and others, 4.1%. El Salvador (21.2%) and Mexico (20.1%) were the most common places of birth for the 66.5% of the residents who were born abroad—which was a high percentage compared to Los Angeles as a whole.

The median yearly household income in 2008 dollars was $29,927, considered low for the city, and high percentages of households earned $40,000 or less. Renters occupied 91.3% of the housing stock, and house-or apartment-owners held 8.7%. The average household size of three people was average for Los Angeles. The percentages of never-married women (33.3%) and men (42.6%) were among the county's highest. One-fifth of the 3,281 families were headed by single parents, a high rate for Los Angeles. In 2000 there were 1,509 veterans, or 2.8% of the population, a low rate compared with the rest of the city and county.

=== Homeless population ===
In 2022, there were 528 homeless people in East Hollywood.

== Geography ==
=== East Hollywood Neighborhood Council ===
According to The East Hollywood Neighborhood Council, East Hollywood is bounded by Western Avenue on the west, Hollywood Boulevard on the north, Hoover Street on the east, and the Hollywood Freeway on the south. It contains these districts:

- District 1: Thai Town
- District 2: Hollymont Junction
- District 3: Hollyset Junction
- District 4: Little Armenia West
- District 5: College Village
- District 6: Virgil Village

=== Mapping L.A. ===
According to the Mapping L.A. project of the Los Angeles Times, East Hollywood borders Los Feliz to the north and Silver Lake, about 4 miles from downtown Los Angeles to the east. It also borders Wilshire Center to the south and Hollywood on the west.

According to the Times, East Hollywood includes the smaller neighborhoods of Thai Town, Little Armenia, and Melrose Hill. However, Melrose Hill is located south of the Hollywood Freeway and outside the boundaries set by The East Hollywood Neighborhood Council. (Melrose Hill is within the Hollywood Studio District Neighborhood Council.) Additionally, the Times does not mention Virgil Village, but the neighborhood is within the boundaries set by the Times.

== Transportation ==
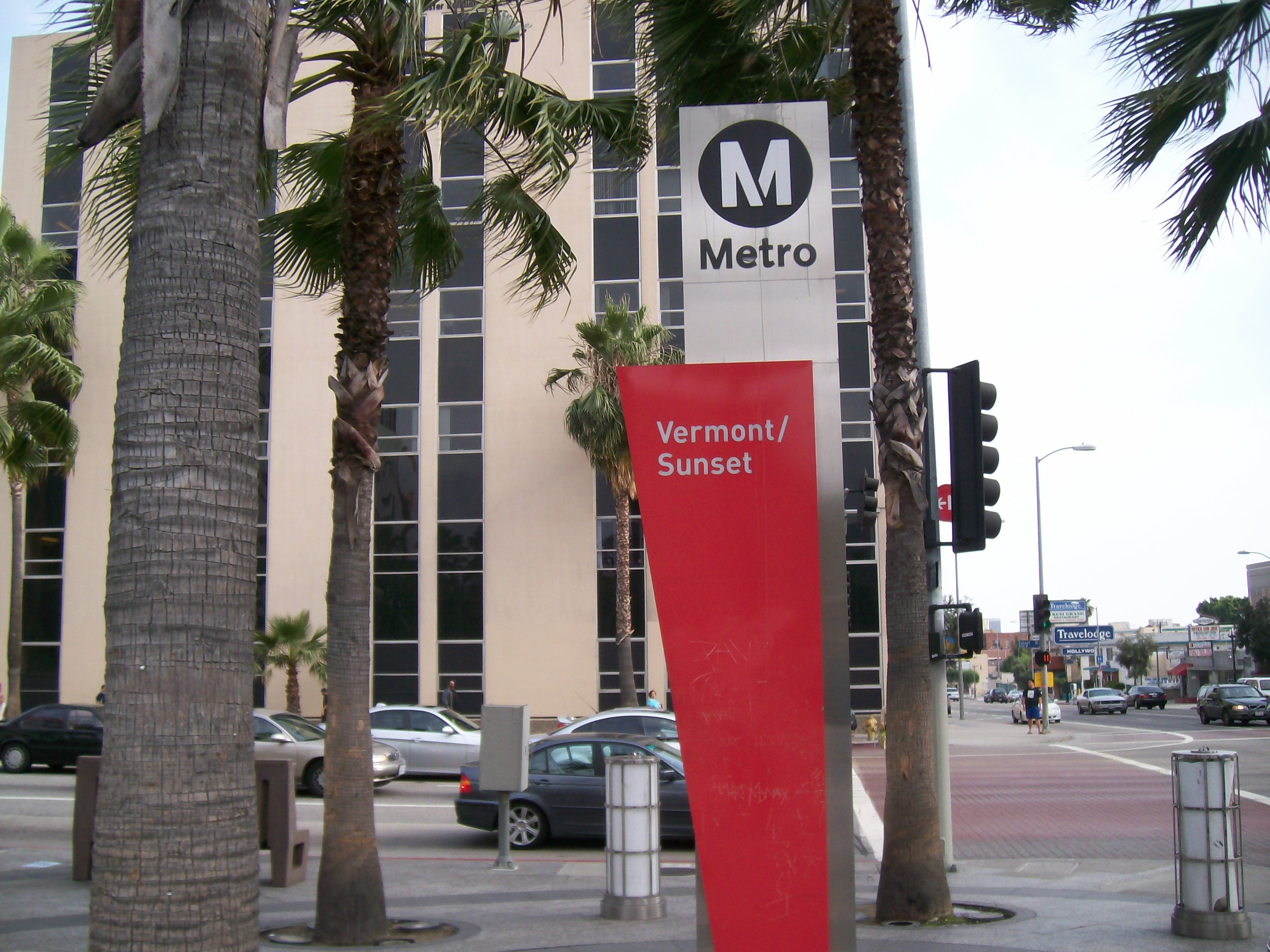
Vermont Ave. and Sunset Bl. intersection, Children's Hospital in the background

East Hollywood is served by the Metro B Line subway which runs north–south along Vermont Avenue and east–west along Hollywood Boulevard.

Metro subway stations include:

- Vermont/Beverly
- Vermont/Santa Monica
- Vermont/Sunset
- Hollywood/Western

Over a dozen bus lines run on the major thoroughfares, including Metro's Rapid and Local service lines. Los Angeles Department of Transportation's DASH shuttle lines, serving East Hollywood, Hollywood, and the Griffith Observatory, also operate in the area.

The 101/Hollywood Freeway cuts northwest from downtown Los Angeles, through Hollywood to the San Fernando Valley.

== Education ==
Thirteen percent of East Hollywood residents aged 25 and older had earned a four-year degree by 2000, an average figure for the city and the county, but the percentage of residents with less than a high school diploma was high for the county.

Schools within East Hollywood's borders:

=== Public ===
- Lexington Avenue Primary Center, elementary, 4564 West Lexington Avenue
- Kingsley Elementary School, 5200 West Virginia Avenue
- Ramona Elementary School, 1133 North Mariposa Avenue
- Lockwood Avenue Elementary School, 4345 Lockwood Avenue
- Dayton Heights Elementary School, 607 North Westmoreland Avenue
- Alexandria Avenue Elementary School, 4211 Oakwood Avenue
- Harvard Elementary School, 330 North Harvard Boulevard

=== Private ===
- Alex Pilibos Armenian School, K-12, 1625 North Alexandria Avenue
- Progressive Student Learning Academy, 1518 North Alexandria Avenue
- Canyon Oaks School, 1414 North Catalina Street
- Immaculate Heart of Mary Elementary School, 1055 North Alexandria Avenue
- Blind Children's Center, Inc., 4120 Marathon Street

== Notable places ==
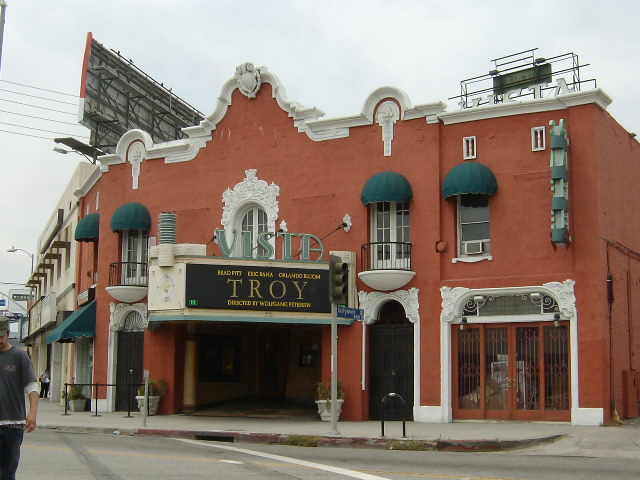
Vista Theatre in East Hollywood

- Barnsdall Art Park
- Braille Institute
- Don Carlos Apartments
- Cahuenga Branch of the Los Angeles Public Library; on the U.S. National Register of Historic Places
- Children's Hospital Los Angeles
- Hollyhock House
- Hollywood Presbyterian Medical Center
- Los Angeles City College
- Rincón Chileno
- Self-Realization Fellowship
- Vista Theatre

== Notable people ==
- Charles Bukowski, writer
- Leonardo DiCaprio, actor and film producer
- Harry Northup, poet and actor

== See also ==
- List of districts and neighborhoods of Los Angeles
- Hollywood, Los Angeles
- West Hollywood, California
- North Hollywood, Los Angeles
