= Virgil Village, Los Angeles =

Neighborhood in Los Angeles

Virgil Village
- Neighborhood of Los Angeles
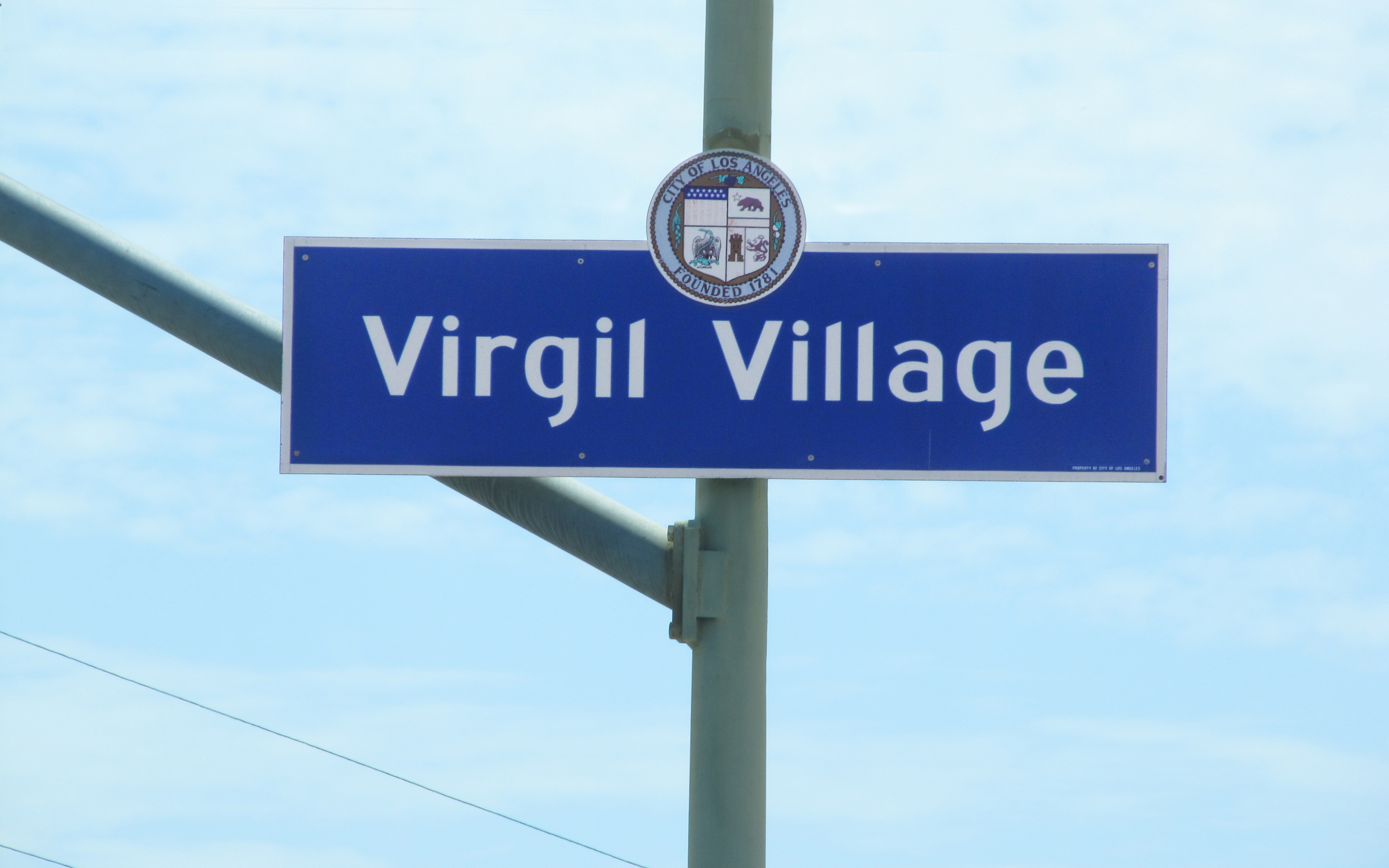
- Virgil Village Neighborhood Sign located on Virgil Avenue and Santa Monica Boulevard

- Location in Central Los Angeles
- Coordinates: 34.0868902°N 118.2878768°W
- Country: US
- State: California
- County: Los Angeles
- City: Los Angeles
- Time zone: UTC-8 (PST)
  - Summer (DST): UTC-7 (PDT)
- ZIP Code: 90029
- Area codes: 323

Virgil Village is a neighborhood within East Hollywood in Los Angeles, California, United States.

== History ==
In 1985, when the restaurant Cha Cha Cha opened at the corner of Virgil Avenue and Melrose Avenue, the Los Angeles Times questioned its location on Melrose Avenue and described the area as both "graffiti-splattered" and "shabby". Nine years later, in 1994, the Times stated that Cha Cha Cha owner Mario Tamayo had started a "renaissance" in the area.

In 1994, the city, in conjunction with the Los Angeles Neighborhood Initiative (LANI), installed banners in the neighborhood with the name Virgil Village. Also that year, Huell Howser visited the neighborhood as part of his PBS series Visiting... with Huell Howser.

In 1996, Virgil Village was one of seven Los Angeles neighborhoods to receive federal funding for improvements. Trees, street lights and bus shelters would be added to the community. The funds were disbursed through LANI and the improvements were focused on Virgil Avenue, the neighborhoods major thoroughfare. By 2007, panaderías, carnicerias and other small, local stores were being replaced with upscale businesses. In 2011, Virgil Village received additional funding from LANI for traffic calming. In 2014, bike lanes and new crosswalks were dedicated at a community event sponsored by Councilmember Mitch O'Farrell.

In the fall of 2016, after 30 years in the neighborhood, Cha Cha Cha restaurant closed and the name Cha Cha Cha was re-used for a condominium development that was built on the restaurant's site. In 2017, after 77 years in the neighborhood, The Smog Cutter, a local bar, closed.

In 2018, after a new landlord bought the building, Super Pan Bakery was given a 60-day notice to vacate. Community residents started a change.org petition to help the panadería. After 20 years in Virgil Village, the bakery relocated to South Park in South Los Angeles. The bakery was replaced by an upscale bagel shop. In addition to bagels, the owners also sell pandulce they pick up from the South Los Angeles location of Super Pan Bakery.

== Geography ==
Located in East Hollywood, the neighborhood of Virgil Village is bounded on the north by Santa Monica Boulevard, on the west by Vermont Avenue, on the south by Melrose Avenue, and on the east by Hoover Street. Virgil Village is bordered by Los Feliz on the north, and Silver Lake on the east. Virgil Avenue, the neighborhood's main thoroughfare, is lined with Trumpet Trees.

== Landmarks and attractions ==
- LACC Swap Meet, 4133 Marathon Street - A swap meet on the grounds of Los Angeles City College that has been running for over 20 years.
- The Smog Cutter, 864 N. Virgil Avenue – A dive bar that was open for 77 years. It closed in 2017.
- The Dog Cafe, 240 N. Virgil Avenue – The first dog café in the United States to offer dogs for foster and adoption on site. It closed in 2020.

== In media ==
- The Virgil, 4519 Santa Monica Boulevard – The bar was used for the drag show where the main characters meet in A Star is Born.

== Government ==
Virgil Village is within the East Hollywood Neighborhood Council. Virgil Village is identified as district 6.

== Education ==
There is one public school within the Virgil Village boundaries:

- Lockwood Avenue Elementary School – 4345 Lockwood Avenue

== Parks and recreation ==
- Madison West Park – 464 North Madison Ave, Los Angeles, CA 90004.
