= Don Carlos Apartments =

Historic apartment complex in Hollywood, California. U.S.

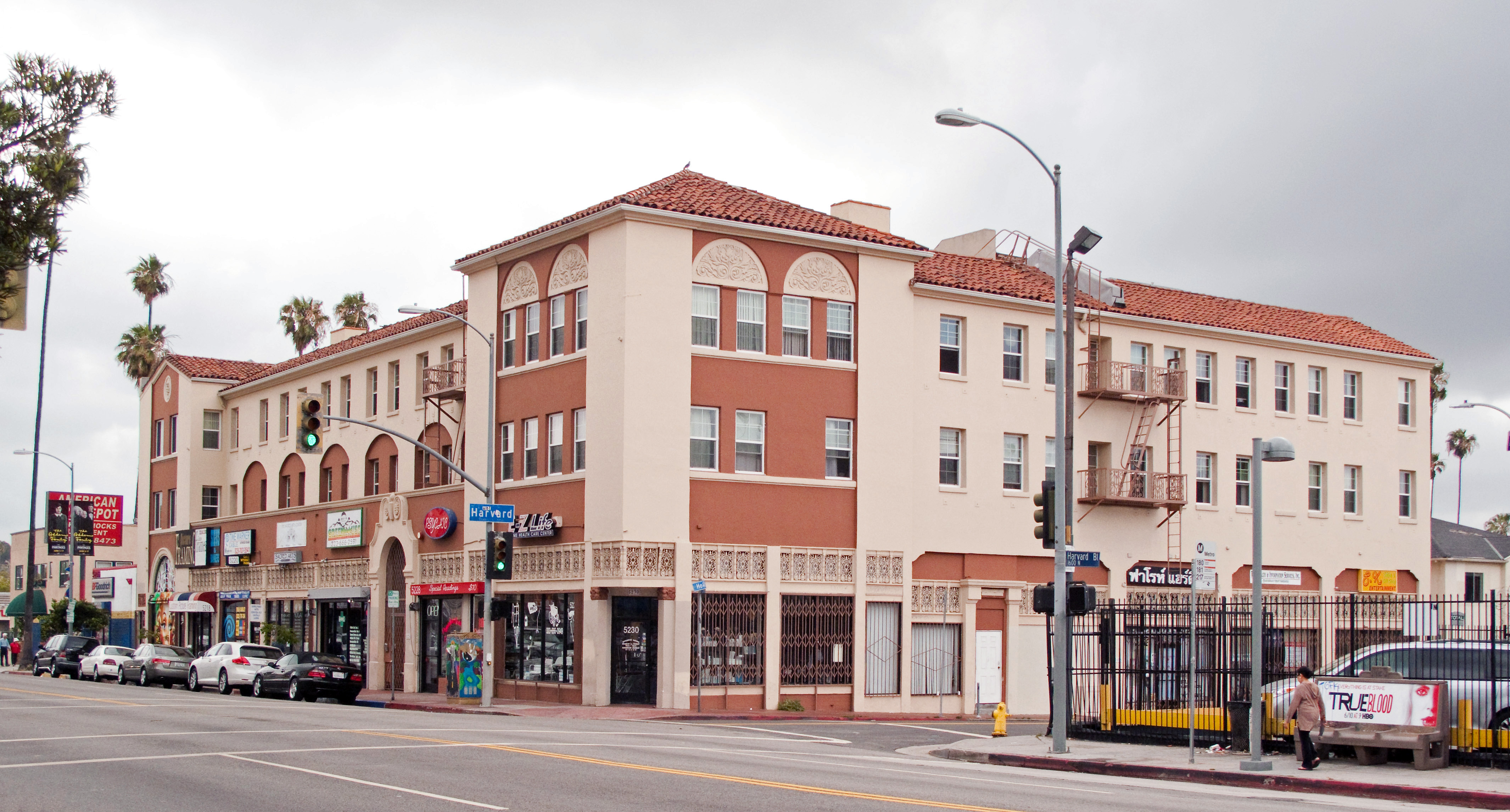
- The building in 2012
- Interactive map of the Don Carlos Apartments area

General information
- Type: Apartment building
- Architectural style: Spanish Colonial Revival
- Location: 5226 Hollywood Boulevard, East Hollywood, Los Angeles, California, U.S.
- Coordinates: 34°06′06″N 118°18′15″W
- Completed: 1931

Design and construction
- Architect: John Larralde

Los Angeles Historic-Cultural Monument
- Designated: April 24, 2002
- Reference no.: 714

Don Carlos Apartments is a historic apartment building located at 5226 Hollywood Boulevard in Thai Town in East Hollywood, Los Angeles, California. It was declared Los Angeles Historic-Cultural Monument No. 714 in 2002.

== History ==
Don Carlos Apartments was designed by John Larralde for C. H. Walton and built in 1931. It is located in present day Thai Town in East Hollywood, Los Angeles.

The building was declared Los Angeles Historic-Cultural Monument No. 714 on April 24, 2002.

== Architecture and design ==
Don Carlos Apartments features a Spanish Colonial Revival design and contains thirty apartment units.
