= José Vicente Féliz =

Settler of Alta California

Comisionado of Los Ángeles
- In office 1781–1786
- Preceded by: Position established
- Succeeded by: Guillermo Soto

Personal details
- Born: José Vicente Tomás Féliz y Esquer c. 1741 Álamos, New Navarre, New Spain (now Sonora, Mexico)
- Died: 1822 (aged 80–81) Santa Barbara, Alta California, First Mexican Empire (now California, U.S.)
- Spouse: María Ignacia Manuela López Piñuelas y Murrieta
- Occupation: Soldier, settler

Military service
- Allegiance: Spain

José Vicente Tomás Féliz y Esquer (c. 1741 – 1822) was a Spanish soldier and settler who was a member of the 1775–76 Anza expedition that brought the first settlers to California. In 1781, he was one of four soldiers who guarded the settlers who founded the settlement of El Pueblo de Nuestra Señora la Reina de los Ángeles (the Town of Our Lady the Queen of the Angels), which would become Los Angeles. He took on a leadership role in the founding and governance of that pueblo, in essence becoming the city's first mayor, and was rewarded for his efforts with a Spanish land grant in the hills above Los Angeles, in the area of what today still bears his name: Los Feliz.

== Early life and immigration to California ==
Féliz was born in Álamos, Sonora, Mexico in approximately 1741. In 1775 he joined the expedition of Juan Bautista de Anza, to bring colonists from Mexico into California. Along with his pregnant wife, Maria Ygnacia Manuela Pinuelas, and their eight children, Féliz began the trek in October 1775, departing from Tubac, Arizona. Tragedy befell the Feliz' along the way, when Maria went into labor as the group was on the outskirts of what is today Tucson, Arizona. While the delivery was successful, Maria died during childbirth, and was buried at the Mission San Xavier del Bac. Padre Pedro Font, in his diary, described the event: "We set out from Tubac at eleven in the morning, and, at half-past three in the afternoon, halted at the place called La Canoa, having traveled some five leagues to the north-northeast. This night the wife of a soldier was delivered; she died in childbed, and the next day was taken to the mission of San Xavier de Bac for burial." The group continued on to arriving at the Mission San Gabriel Arcángel arriving there in January 1776.

By 1781, Féliz was still stationed at the San Gabriel mission when a group of 44 settlers arrived, on their way to found a new city further south, what would become known as Los Angeles. Some of the settlers had contracted smallpox, and so were quarantined for a short time, during which another group of settlers arrived. Feliz was selected as one of four soldiers to accompany the now total of 44 settlers, the pobladores to their new pueblo. On September 4, 1781, Féliz led the pobladores the eight miles from San Gabriel to the town site on the bank of the Río Porciúncula, where they founded the city of Los Angeles on a site chosen by Felipe de Neve, governor of California. The name first given to the settlement is debated. Historian Doyce B. Nunis has said that the Spanish named it "El Pueblo de la Reyna de los Ángeles" ("The Town of the Queen of the Angels"). For proof, he pointed to a map dated 1785, where that phrase was used. Frank Weber, the diocesan archivist, replied, however, that the name given by the founders was "El Pueblo de Nuestra Señora de los Ángeles de Porciuncula", or "the town of Our Lady of the Angels of Porciuncula." and that the map was in error. Feliz was appointed the settlement's first comisionado, literally the first mayor.

== Rancho Los Feliz ==
Some time between 1796 and 1802, Feliz was awarded a land grant to the east of the Pueblo de Los Angeles. One of the first land grants in California, it consisted of 6,647 acres (26.90 km^{2}). Bounded on the east by the Los Angeles River, the land, known as El Rancho de Nuestra Señora de Refugio de Los Feliz (Ranch of Our Lady of Refuge of the Feliz Family) Felipe de Goycoechea reported five ranchos in private possession in 1795, none of them the Feliz rancho. An 1802 letter from Goycoechea, on the other hand, assumed Borica or some other governor granted Vicente the rancho. The grant comprised what is today Los Feliz, Griffith Park, East Hollywood, and Silver Lake. The rancho remained in the Feliz family until 1863. The area's boundaries were the Los Angeles River to the north and east, and the Santa Monica Mountains to the west.
