= Melrose Hill, Los Angeles =

Melrose Hill
- Neighborhood of Los Angeles
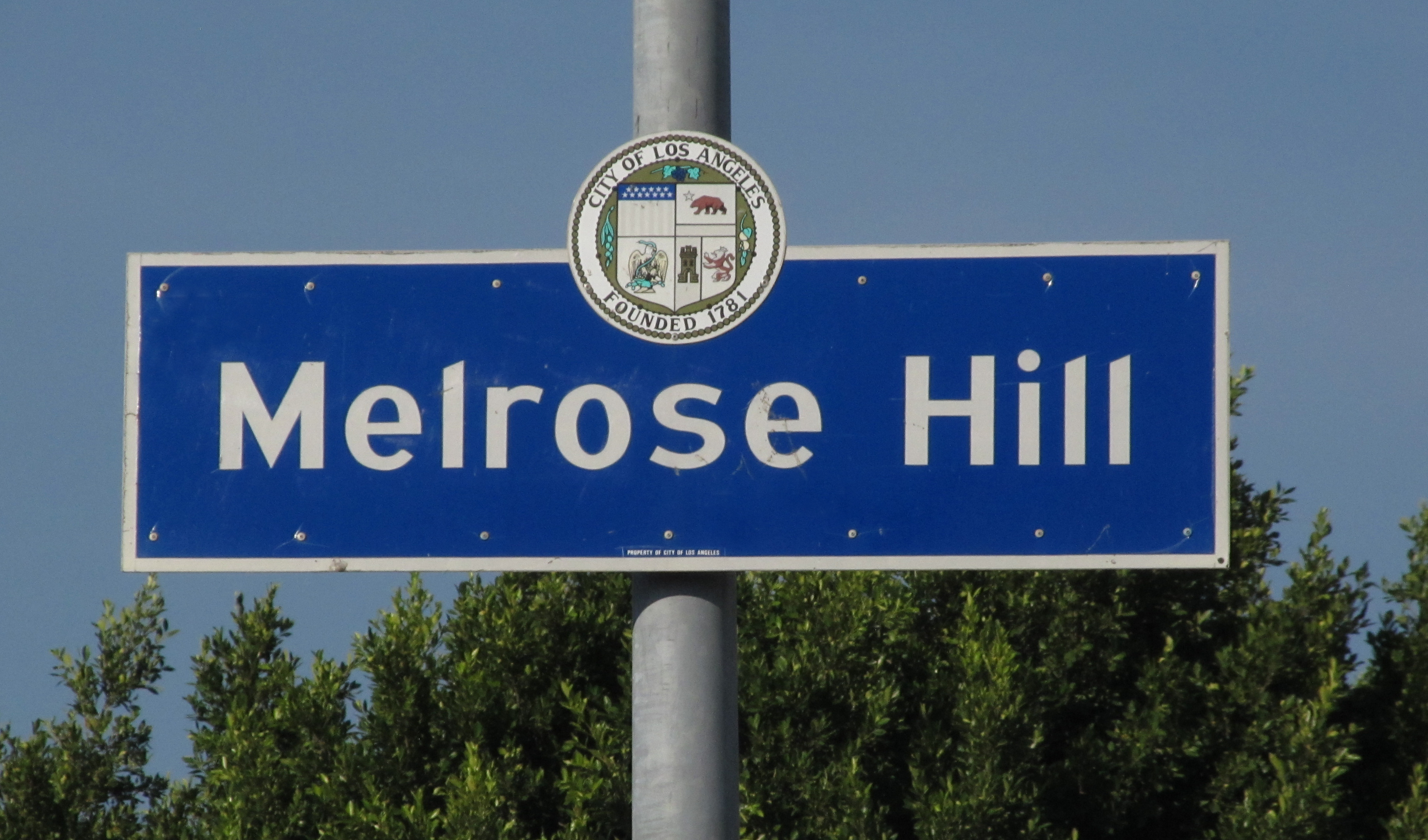
- Melrose Hill neighborhood sign located at the intersection of Western Avenue and Marathon Street.

- Location within Los Angeles
- Coordinates: 34°05′00″N 118°18′26″W
- Country: United States of America
- State: California
- County: Los Angeles
- Time zone: Pacific
- ZIP Code: 90029
- Area code: 323

Melrose Hill is a neighborhood in Los Angeles. A portion of the neighborhood is designated as a Historic Preservation Overlay Zone.

== History ==
Sidney L. Briggs and M. P. Gilbert first acquired and developed the area in 1906. Lot prices started at $425. Wilshire District developer Avery McCarthy christened the main thoroughfare Melrose Avenue, after his family’s hometown of Melrose, Mass., and named the highest point in the tract—about 337 feet above sea level—Melrose Hill.

In January 2003, Los Angeles magazine profiled the Melrose Hill HPOZ and named it one of the city's "10 Great Neighborhoods You've Never Heard Of."

== Geography ==
Melrose Hill is located north of Melrose Avenue, south of Santa Monica Blvd., east of Western Avenue, and west of the Hollywood Freeway.

The city of Los Angeles has installed neighborhood signs to mark the neighborhood boundaries, with signs located at Western Avenue and Santa Monica Boulevard, Western Avenue and Marathon Street and Western Avenue and Melrose Avenue. There is also a sign at Melrose Avenue and Ardmore Avenue.

Hollywood is located to the north, and the intersection of Western Avenue and Santa Monica Boulevard "splits the two neighborhoods".

== Melrose Hill HPOZ ==
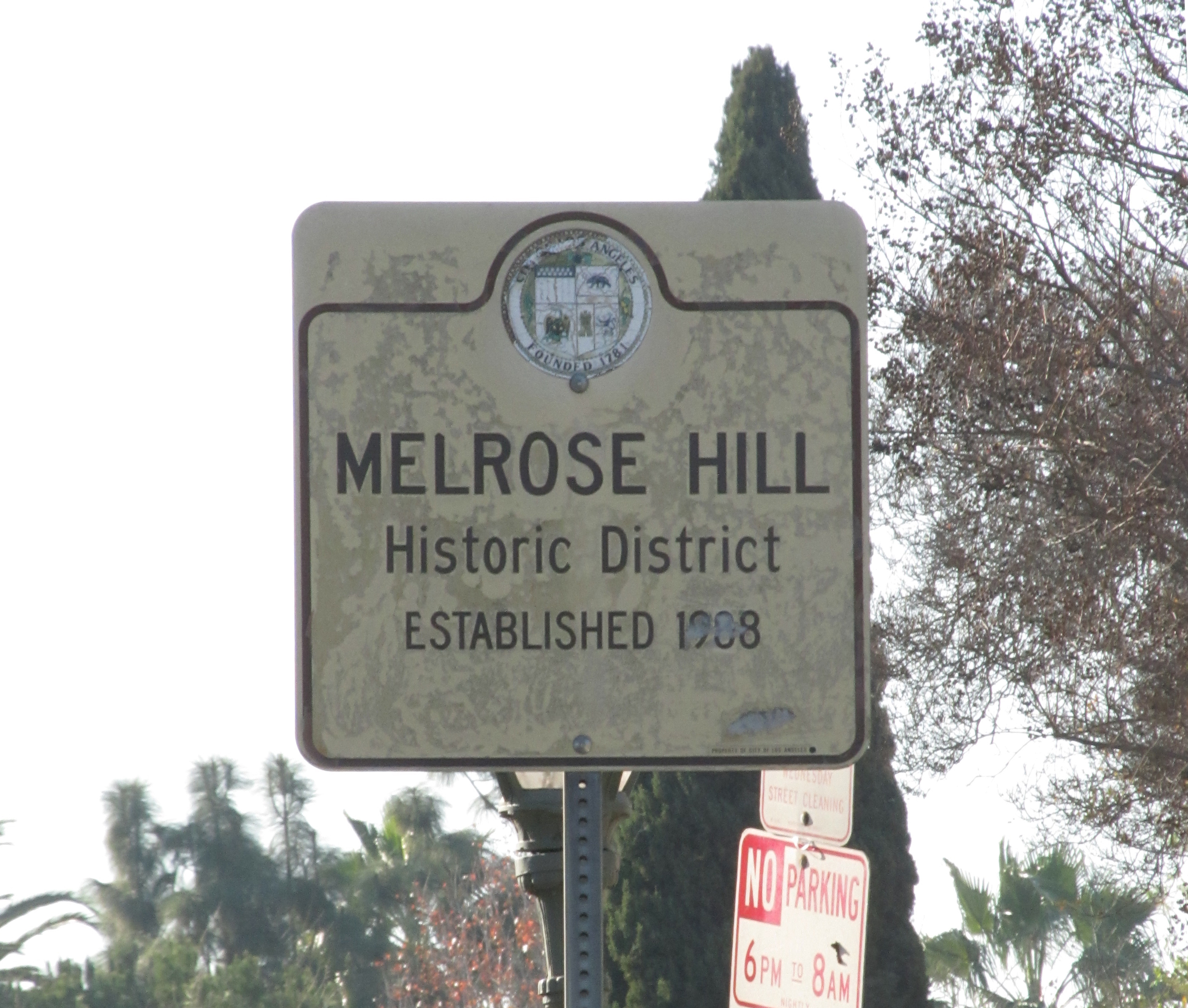
HPOZ sign located at Hobart Boulevard and Marathon Street

Within Melrose Hill is the Melrose Hill Historic Preservation Overlay Zone (HPOZ). The HPOZ covers homes on Marathon Street (between Hobart Boulevard and Oxford Avenue), North Melrose Hill Street and West Melrose Hill Street. HPOZ signage is installed at the intersection of Hobart Boulevard and Marathon Street.

The neighborhood's historic status was designated by the city in 1988. The 42 residences within the HPOZ are modest Craftsman and Colonial Revival bungalows built between 1911 and 1926.

The neighborhood streetlamps are made from the same mold that was used at the turn of the 20th century to supply the lighting towers for New York's Central Park. The streetlights were installed in 1980 and spurred the movement for the neighborhood to seek historic status.

== Government ==
The Los Angeles Times Mapping Project places Melrose Hill in East Hollywood. However, it is not part of the East Hollywood Neighborhood Council and instead is part of the Hollywood Studio District Neighborhood Council.

== Parks and recreation ==
- Lemon Grove Recreation Center, 4959 Lemon Grove Avenue
