= Los Feliz Boulevard =

Street in Glendale and Los Angeles, California

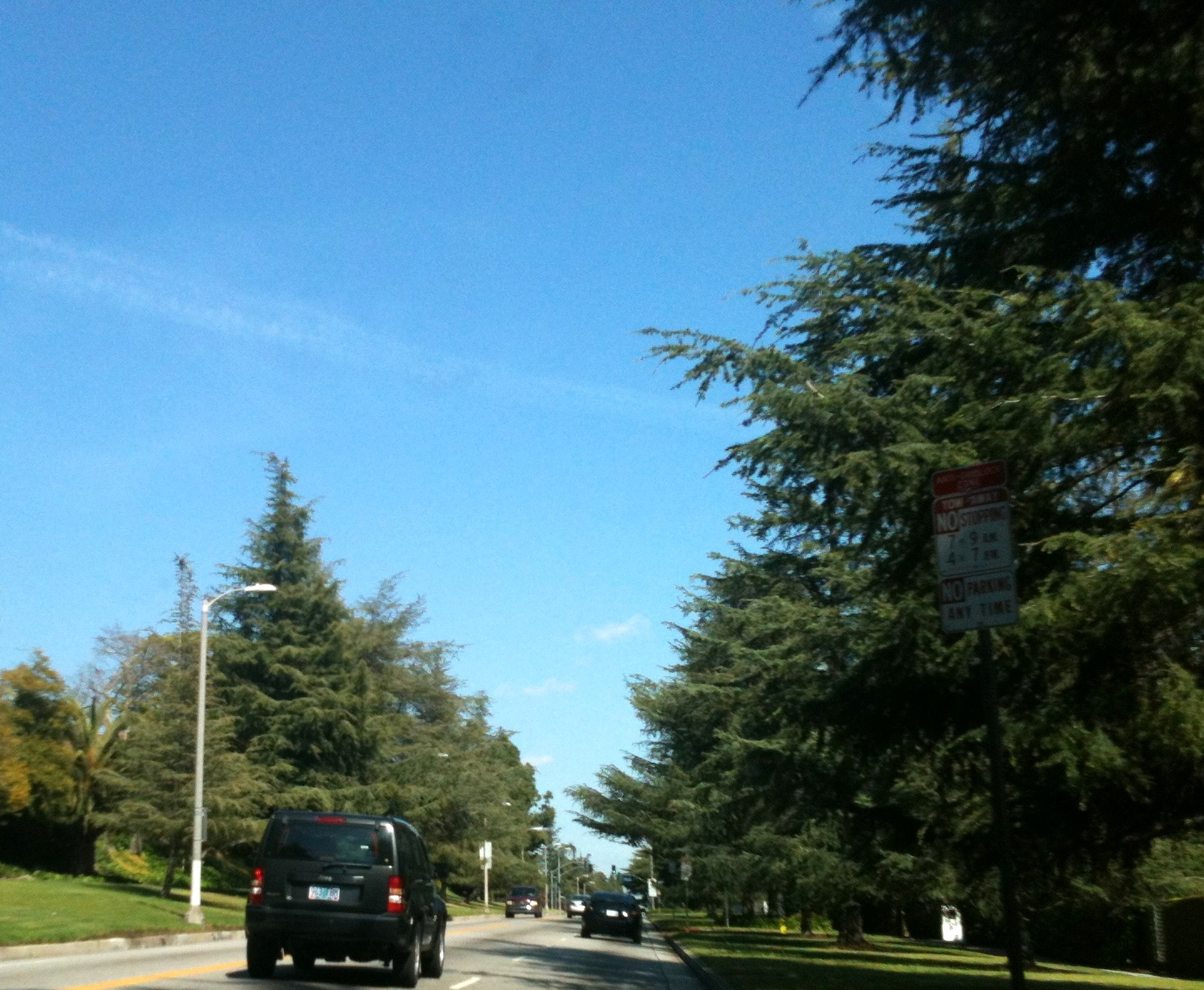
- Los Feliz Boulevard treelined with Deodar trees, heading east near Los Feliz and Edgemont
- Maintained by: Bureau of Street Services, City of L.A. DPW
- Length: 5 mi (8.0 km)
- Location: Los Angeles County, California
- West end: Western Avenue in Los Feliz
- Major junctions: I-5 in Atwater Village
- East end: Glendale Avenue in Glendale

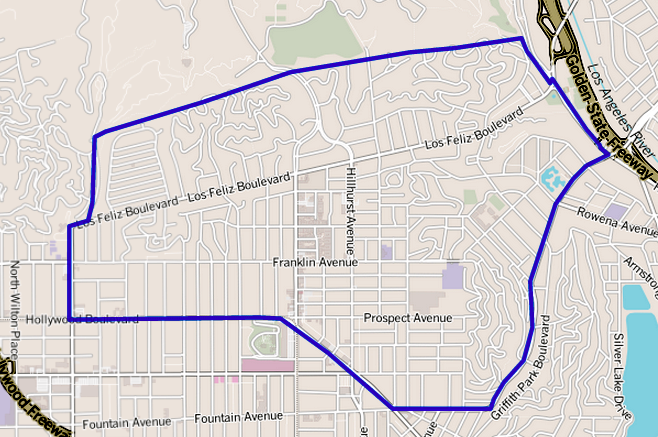
Los Feliz neighborhood, as mapped by the Los Angeles Times

Los Feliz Boulevard is a street in Glendale and Los Angeles, California, United States.

The west-east thoroughfare runs through Los Angeles and Glendale. It is the primary thoroughfare of the Los Feliz neighborhood. It starts off at its easternmost point at Glendale Avenue in Glendale as Los Feliz Road. After passing the Metrolink railroad tracks in western Glendale, it enters Los Angeles and becomes Los Feliz Boulevard.

Los Feliz passes through Atwater Village and serves as the demarcation of the south east corner of Griffith Park. It is exit 141 off the Golden State Freeway. From there it generally parallels the southern border of Griffith Park, offset by a couple of residential blocks. After Griffith Park, at the American Film Institute Conservatory, it swerves to a north-south street and ends. It then merges and becomes Western Avenue, which runs all the way down to its southern terminus near the tide pools in the San Pedro area. Going north on Vermont Avenue leads to the Greek Theatre and Griffith Observatory.

== Notable landmarks ==
- Griffith Park
- Philosophical Research Society

== Transportation ==
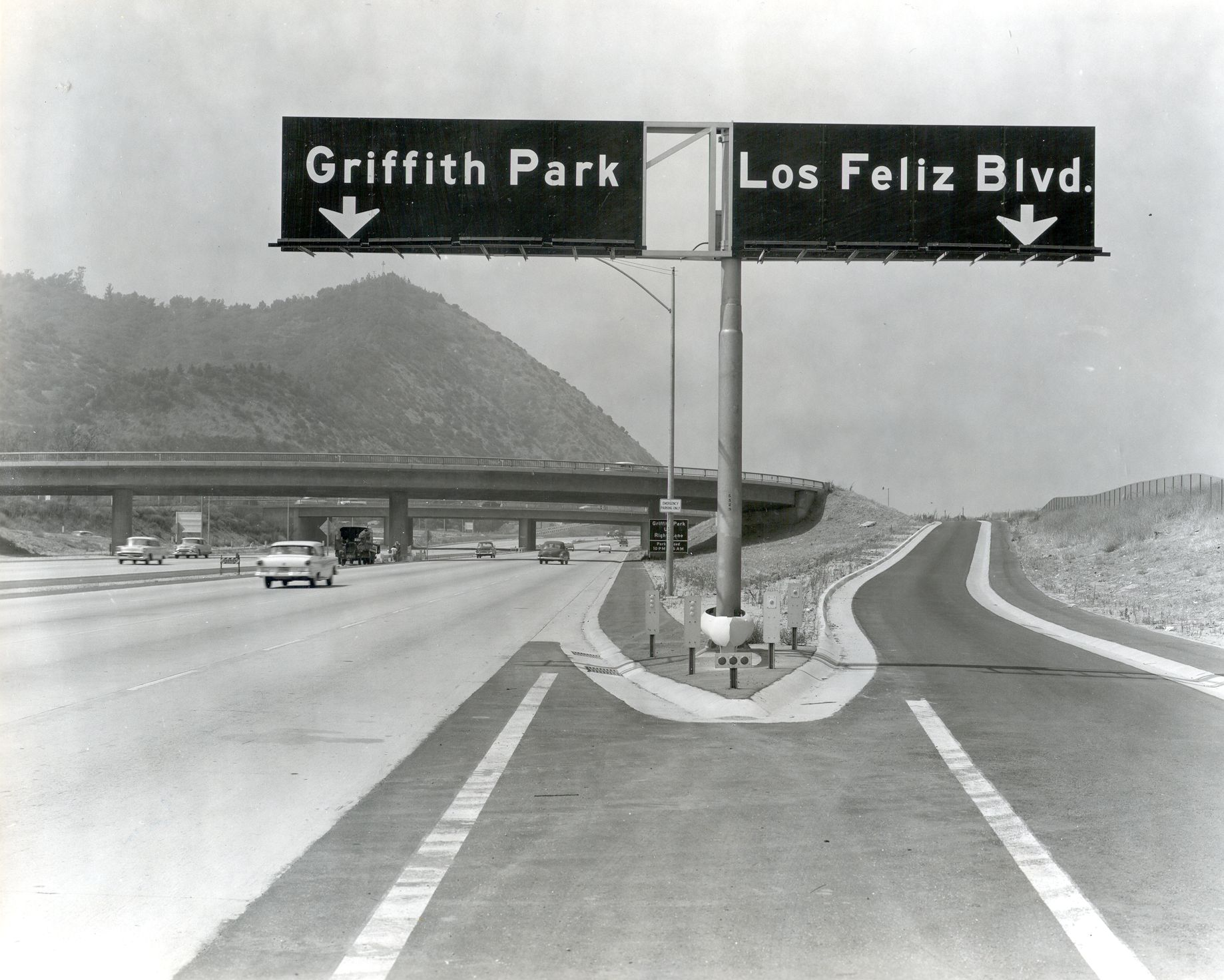
Los Feliz Boulevard exit on Interstate 5 in 1958

The following lines operate on Los Feliz Boulevard:

- Metro Local lines 180 headed for Hollywood and Pasadena.
- DASH Los Feliz runs on Los Feliz boulevard between Vermont and Hillhurst and connects to the Metro B Line subway service at Sunset and Vermont.
