= Rancho Los Feliz =

Spanish-era land grant in California

Coordinates: 34.120°N 118.300°W

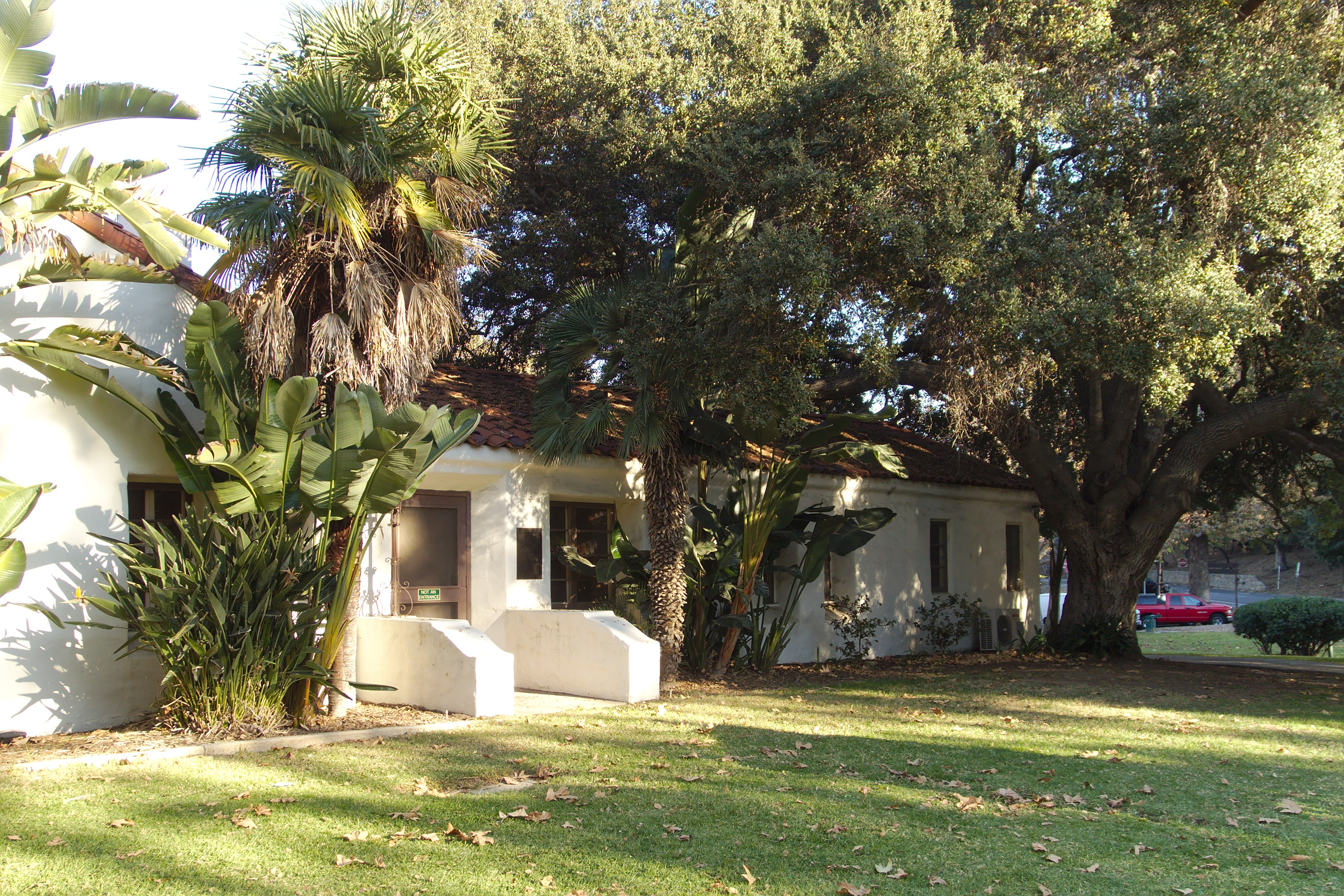
Antonio Feliz adobe in 2015

Rancho de Los Feliz was a 6,647-acre (2,690 ha; 26.90 km^{2}) Spanish land concession in present-day Los Angeles County, California, purportedly given in 1795 by Spanish Governor Pedro Fages to José Vicente Féliz, although there is no deed or other record.. The land of the grant includes Los Feliz and Griffith Park, and was bounded on the east by the Los Angeles River.

== History ==
Given to Jose Vicente Feliz, this was one of the first land grants made in California. Vicente Feliz was, thought of as the first Comisionado of Los Angeles. Born in Sonora, Mexico, about 1741, Corporal Feliz, a veteran of the Anza Expedition of 1776, was the Spanish military leader at the Pueblo of Los Angeles. In 1787 Governor Fages appointed Feliz as Comisionado of the Los Angeles Pueblo, giving him the powers of Mayor and Judge. Some sources say that, for his service, Feliz was granted Rancho Los Feliz, however, historian Hubert Bancroft, in his History of California, doubted any governor granted a rancho of any size to him.

Mexican Governor Manuel Micheltorena granted the rancho to María Ygnacia Verdugo. María Ygnacia Verdugo was the wife of one of the sons of Anastacio María Féliz. Anastacio was probably a cousin of José Vicente Féliz. When María's husband died, she petitioned for a grant in her name and in the name of her son José Antonio Féliz. Governor Micheltorena granted it to her in 1843. She did not remarry.

Hand-drawn diseño for the Rancho Los Feliz

With the cession of California to the United States following the Mexican–American War, the 1848 Treaty of Guadalupe Hidalgo provided that the land grants would be honored. As required by the Land Act of 1851, a claim for Rancho Los Feliz was filed with the Public Land Commission in 1852, and the grant was patented to María Ygnacia Verdugo (written "M.Y. Berdugo") in 1871.

María Ygnacía Verdugo deeded some of the rancho to her daughters in 1853.

In 1863, the executor of Antonio Féliz's estate – Antonio F. Coronel – acquired ownership of what remained of Rancho de Los Feliz from the heirs of María Ygnacia Verdugo. Cyrus Lyon sold the land on the former rancho the city gave to him in the 1850s as "donation lots" to San Francisco real estate developer James Lick. The city's claim to this area was based on its grant of "four-leagues square."

In 1882, Colonel Griffith Jenkins Griffith acquired 4,071 acres (16.5 km^{2}) of Rancho Los Feliz. Colonel Griffith donated to the city of Los Angeles 3,015 acres (12.2 km^{2}) (nearly half of the original rancho), which became Griffith Park, one of the largest city-owned parks in the country. At the time, the Lick estate still owned the southwest portion of the rancho, and there developed the Lick Tract, which later became a part of Hollywood.

== Historic sites of the Rancho ==
- Los Feliz Adobe. A restored adobe -- the original built by Maria Ygnacia Verdugo in about 1853 still stands in Griffith Park (Park Ranger's Headquarters).
- Maugna, site of former Native American Tongva ranchería settlement preceding the Mexican rancho.

== See also ==
- Ranchos of California
- List of Ranchos of California
- Ranchos of Los Angeles County
