= Los Feliz, Los Angeles =

Los Feliz
- Neighborhood of Los Angeles
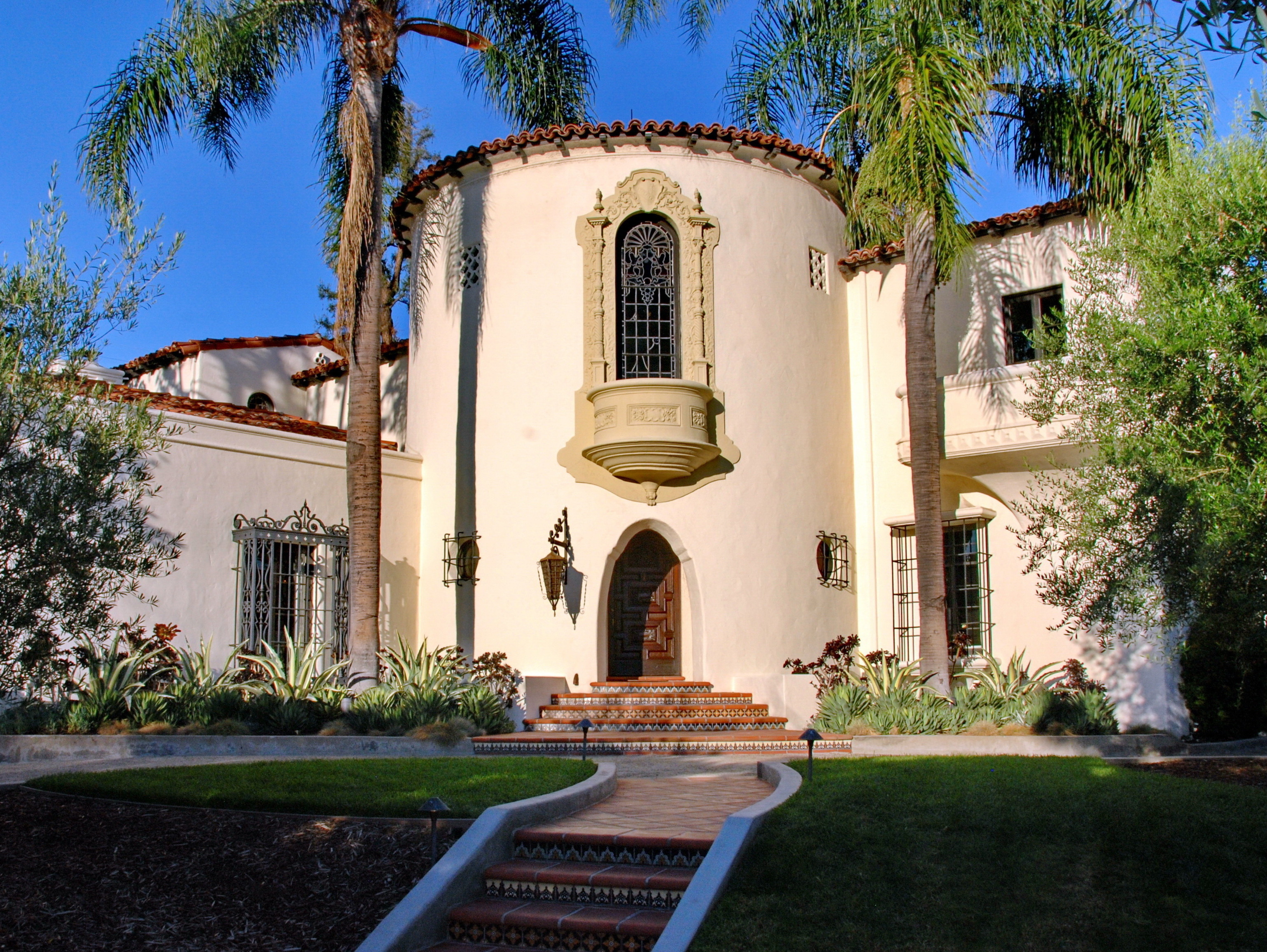
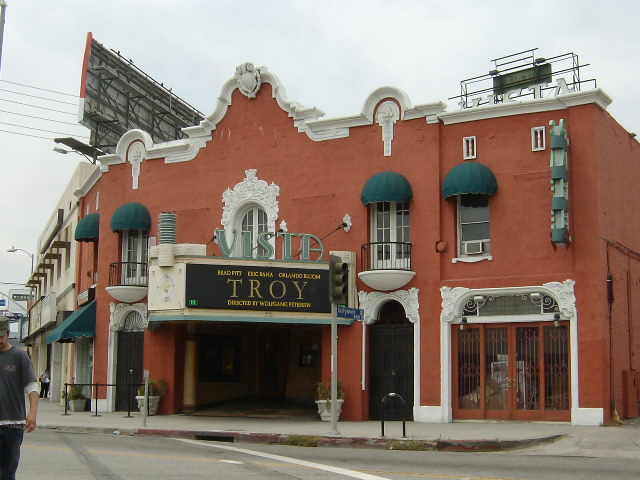
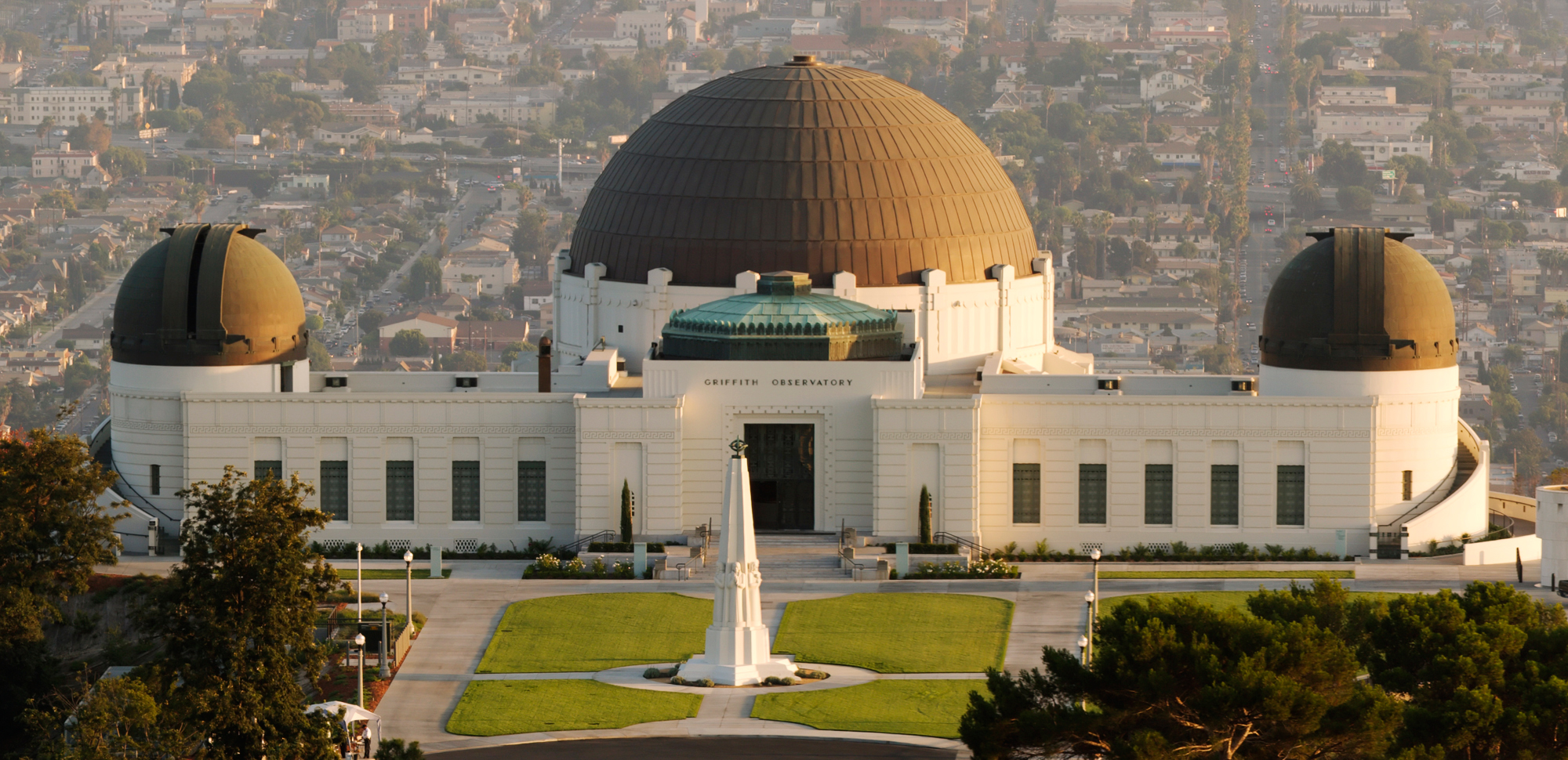
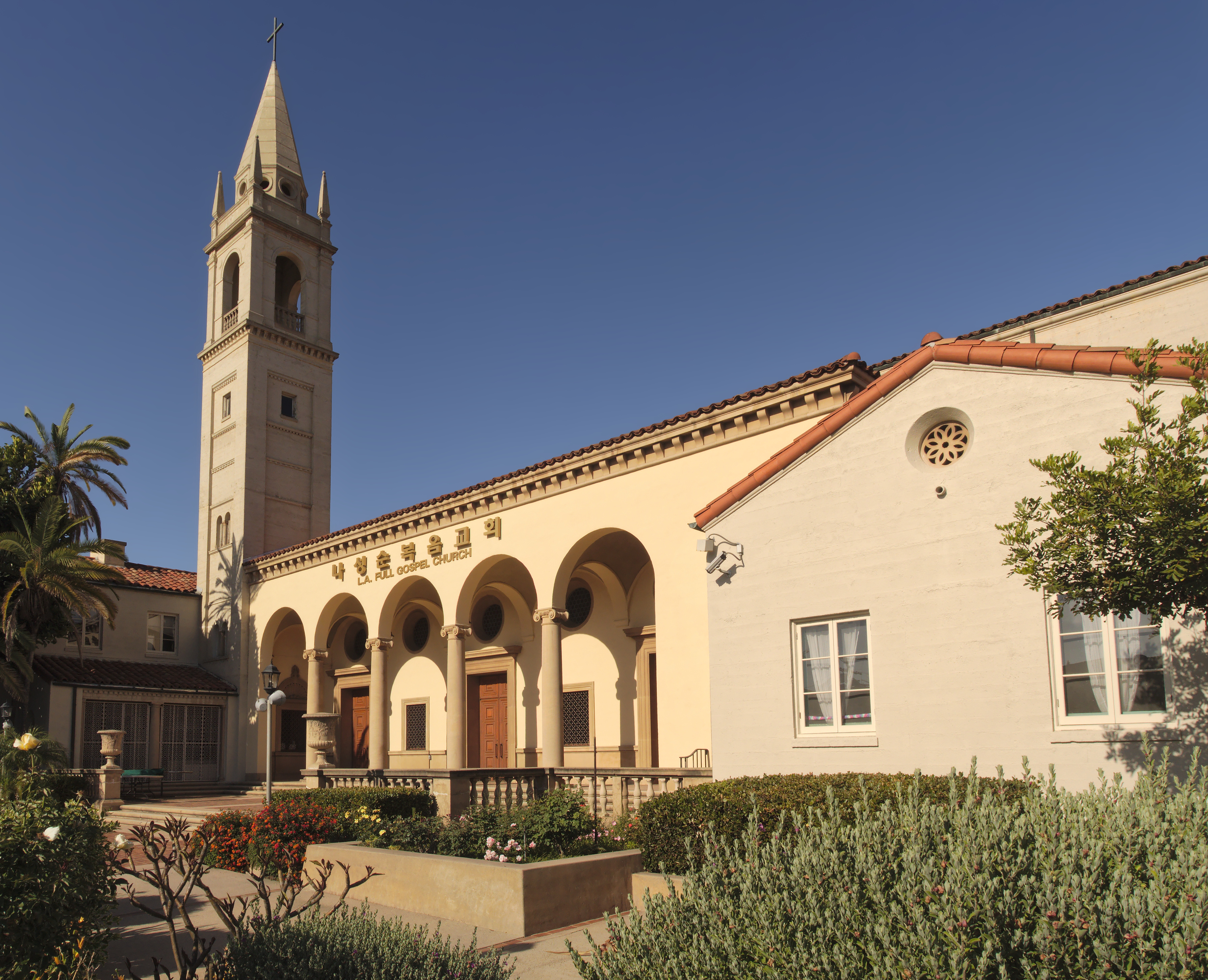
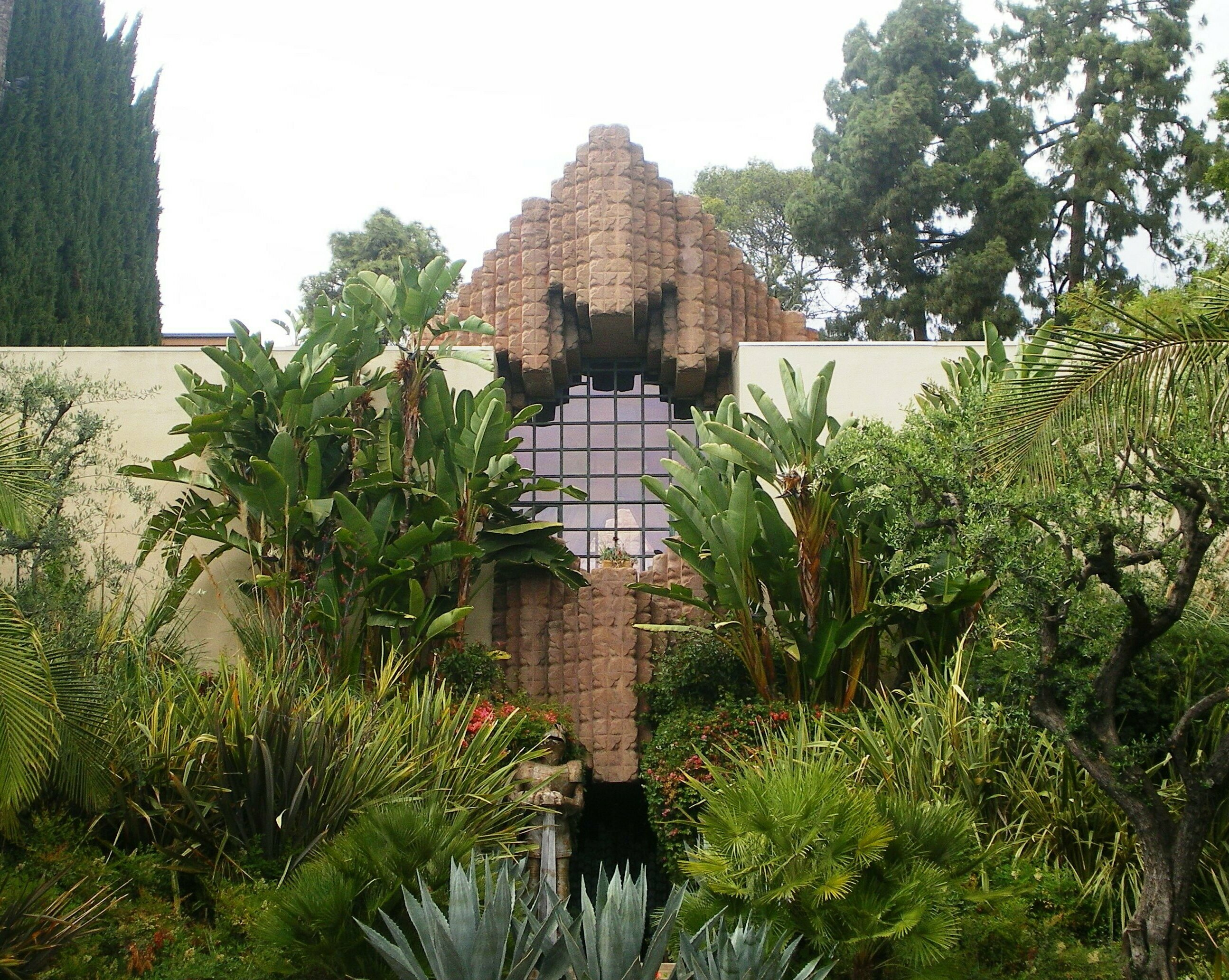
- Top: Abraham Gore House (left), Vista Theatre (right); middle: Griffith Observatory; bottom: Church of Christ, Scientist (left), Sowden House (right).

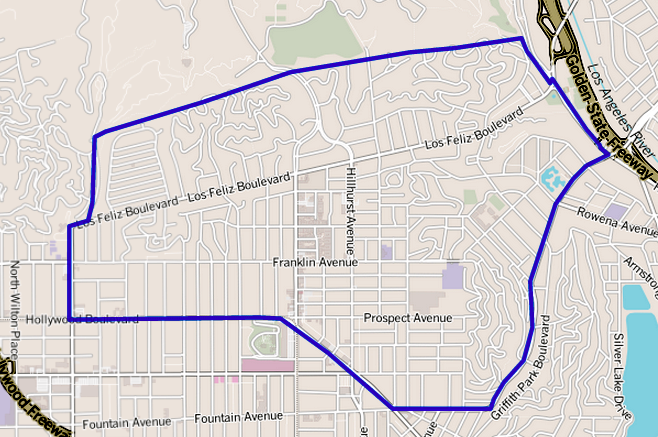
- Los Feliz neighborhood, as mapped by the Los Angeles Times

- Location within Central Los Angeles
- Coordinates: 34.1124°N 118.2851°W
- Country: United States
- State: California
- County: Los Angeles
- City: Los Angeles
- Named for: Rancho Los Feliz
- Elevation: 469 ft (143 m)
- Time zone: UTC-8 (PST)
  - Summer (DST): UTC-7 (PDT)
- ZIP code: 90027
- Area codes: 213, 323

Los Feliz (/loʊs ˈfiːlɪs/; Spanish for "The Feliz (family)", Latin American Spanish pronunciation: [los ˌfeˈlis]) is an American hillside neighborhood in the greater Hollywood area of Los Angeles, California, abutting Hollywood and encompassing part of the Santa Monica Mountains. The neighborhood is named after the Feliz family of Californios who had owned the area since 1795, when José Vicente Féliz was granted Rancho Los Feliz.

== History ==
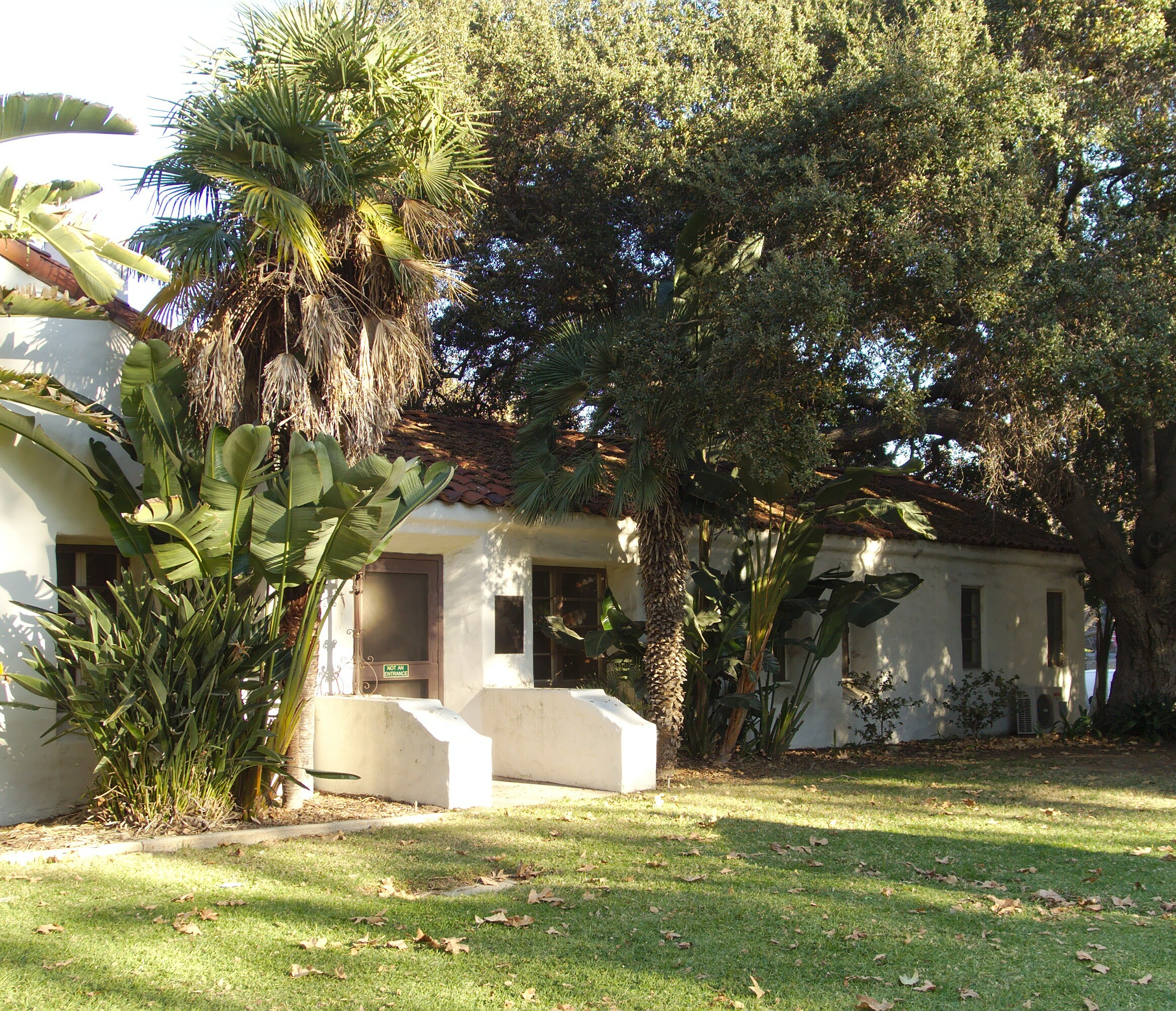
The Rancho Los Feliz Adobe, built in 1853 by María Ygnacia Verdugo de Feliz, is the oldest building in Los Feliz.

=== Indigenous era ===
Prior to the arrival of Spanish settlers along the Los Angeles River, the region was inhabited exclusively by Native American groups. It is estimated that these communities lived in the area for thousands of years before European contact.

=== Spanish and Mexican eras ===
When Gaspar de Portolà traveled through the vicinity in 1769, his expedition encountered members of this village.

The 6,647-acre (27 km^{2}) Rancho Los Feliz, one of the first land grants in California, was granted to Corporal José Vicente Feliz. An old adobe house built in the 1830s by his heirs still stands on Crystal Springs Drive in Griffith Park. Other sections of the rancho were developed and became the communities of Los Feliz and Silver Lake.

=== Post-Conquest era ===
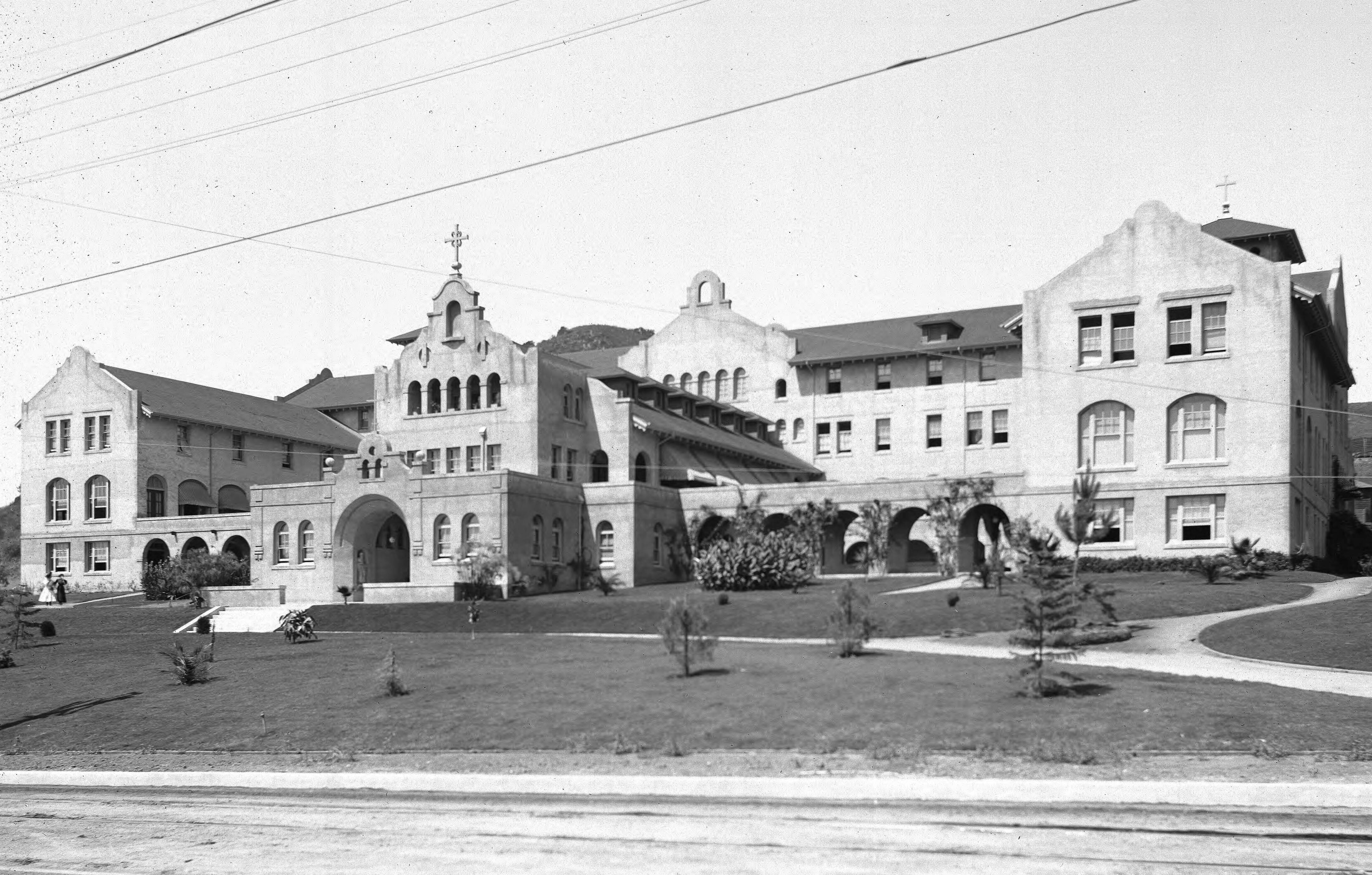
Immaculate Heart College in 1905

Following the American conquest of California, Rancho Los Feliz had a succession of owners after the Feliz family. The family first sold the rancho to noted statesman Antonio F. Coronel, before it passed to James Lick, whose estate sold the rancho to Griffith J. Griffith. Griffith donated over half of the ranch to the city of Los Angeles. This ranch became one of the largest city-owned parks in the country, Griffith Park.

In 1882, Colonel Griffith acquired 4,071 acres (16 km^{2}) of Rancho Los Feliz. The Lick estate still owned the southwest portion of the rancho and there developed the Lick Tract, which later became a part of Hollywood. Griffith never served in any branch of the U.S. armed forces, but he was given the honorary title of colonel by influential friends in the California National Guard. The title remained a permanent fixture to his name.

=== Modern era ===
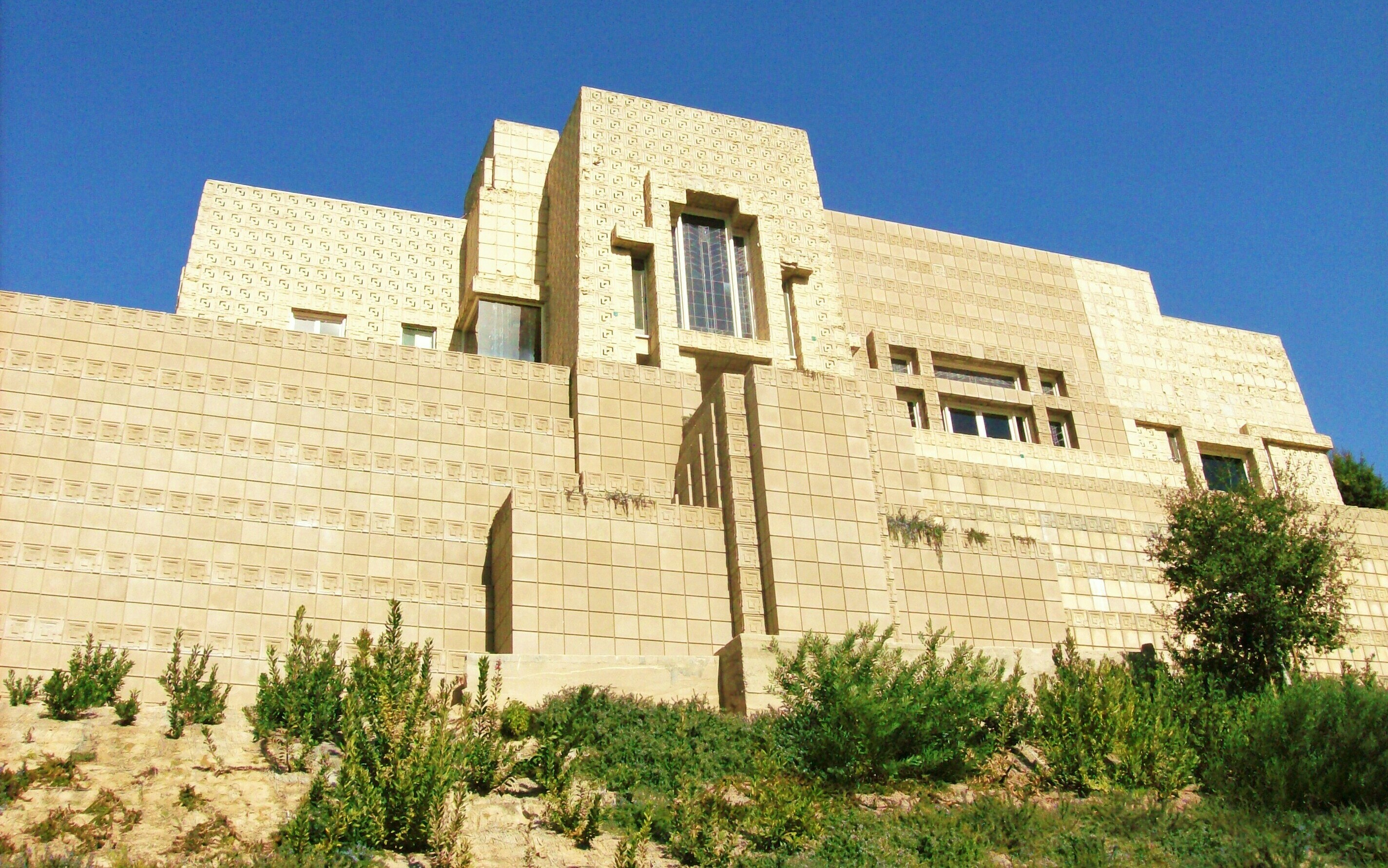
Ennis House, designed by Frank Lloyd Wright, was built in 1924.

In 1900, there were only 23 properties in Los Feliz.

Griffith died on July 6, 1919, at the age of 67. Griffith bequeathed $700,000 and his Los Feliz acreage to the city of Los Angeles to be used for additions to Griffith Park.

On August 9, 1969, Charles Manson and six others murdered supermarket executive Leno LaBianca and his wife Rosemary in their home located at 3301 Waverly Drive in Los Feliz, henceforth known as the Tate–LaBianca murders.

On May 8–9, 2007, about 800 acres (3.2 km^{2}) of uninhabited terrain in Los Feliz and Griffith Park, including the famous Dante's View, were destroyed in a wildfire. After the fire, Los Angeles city officials pledged millions of dollars in aid to repair the damage.

== Geography ==
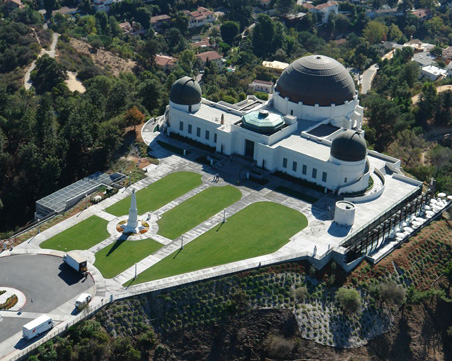
Griffith Observatory, in Griffith Park, was built in 1935.

Los Feliz encompasses several smaller but distinct areas, including the Los Feliz Hills and Los Feliz Estates (north of Los Feliz Boulevard), Laughlin Park, Los Feliz Village, Los Feliz Square, Los Feliz Knolls, and Franklin Hills.

According to the Mapping L.A. project of the Los Angeles Times, Los Feliz is part of central Los Angeles. It is flanked on the north by Griffith Park, on the northeast by Atwater Village, on the southeast by Silver Lake, on the south by East Hollywood, and on the northwest by Hollywood and Hollywood Hills. Los Feliz is situated near the 101 and the 5 freeways in Hollywood and Atwater Village respectively. The neighborhood's boundaries (as used by Mapping L.A.) are the Griffith Park line between Fern Dell Drive and Riverside Drive on the north; the Los Angeles River on the east; Hyperion Avenue and Griffith Park Boulevard on the southeast; Fountain Avenue and Hollywood Boulevard on the south; and Western Avenue, Los Feliz Boulevard, and Fern Dell Drive on the west and northwest. The boundaries of the Los Feliz Improvement Association extend further west to Canyon Drive.

Los Feliz experiences a hot-summer Mediterranean climate (Csa), just like most of Central Los Angeles.

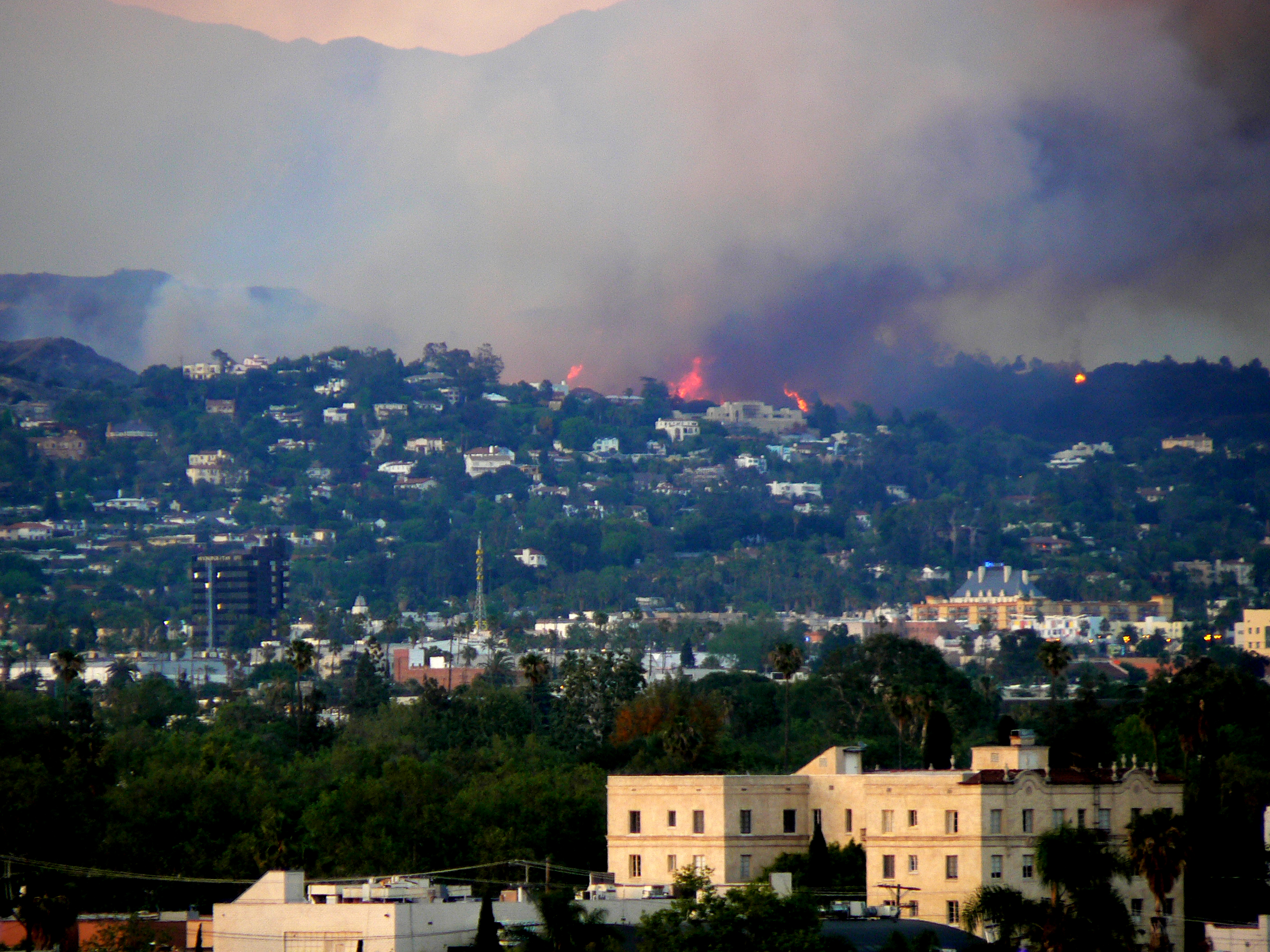
Griffith Park fire in 2007.

Climate data for Los Feliz, Los Angeles, California
Month	Jan	Feb	Mar	Apr	May	Jun	Jul	Aug	Sep	Oct	Nov	Dec	Year
Record high °F (°C)	95 (35)	95 (35)	99 (37)	106 (41)	103 (39)	112 (44)	109 (43)	106 (41)	113 (45)	108 (42)	100 (38)	92 (33)	113 (45)
Mean daily maximum °F (°C)	68.1 (20.1)	69.8 (21.0)	70.3 (21.3)	74.8 (23.8)	75.7 (24.3)	78.8 (26.0)	84.8 (29.3)	86.2 (30.1)	84.8 (29.3)	80.1 (26.7)	73.5 (23.1)	68.0 (20.0)	76.2 (24.6)
Mean daily minimum °F (°C)	45.1 (7.3)	46.8 (8.2)	48.1 (8.9)	51.2 (10.7)	55.4 (13.0)	58.9 (14.9)	61.8 (16.6)	63.2 (17.3)	61.4 (16.3)	56.4 (13.6)	48.1 (8.9)	44.2 (6.8)	53.4 (11.9)
Record low °F (°C)	28 (−2)	28 (−2)	31 (−1)	36 (2)	40 (4)	46 (8)	49 (9)	49 (9)	44 (7)	40 (4)	34 (1)	30 (−1)	28 (−2)
Average precipitation inches (mm)	3.12 (79)	3.80 (97)	2.43 (62)	0.91 (23)	0.26 (6.6)	0.09 (2.3)	0.01 (0.25)	0.04 (1.0)	0.24 (6.1)	0.66 (17)	1.04 (26)	2.33 (59)	14.93 (379)

== Demographics ==
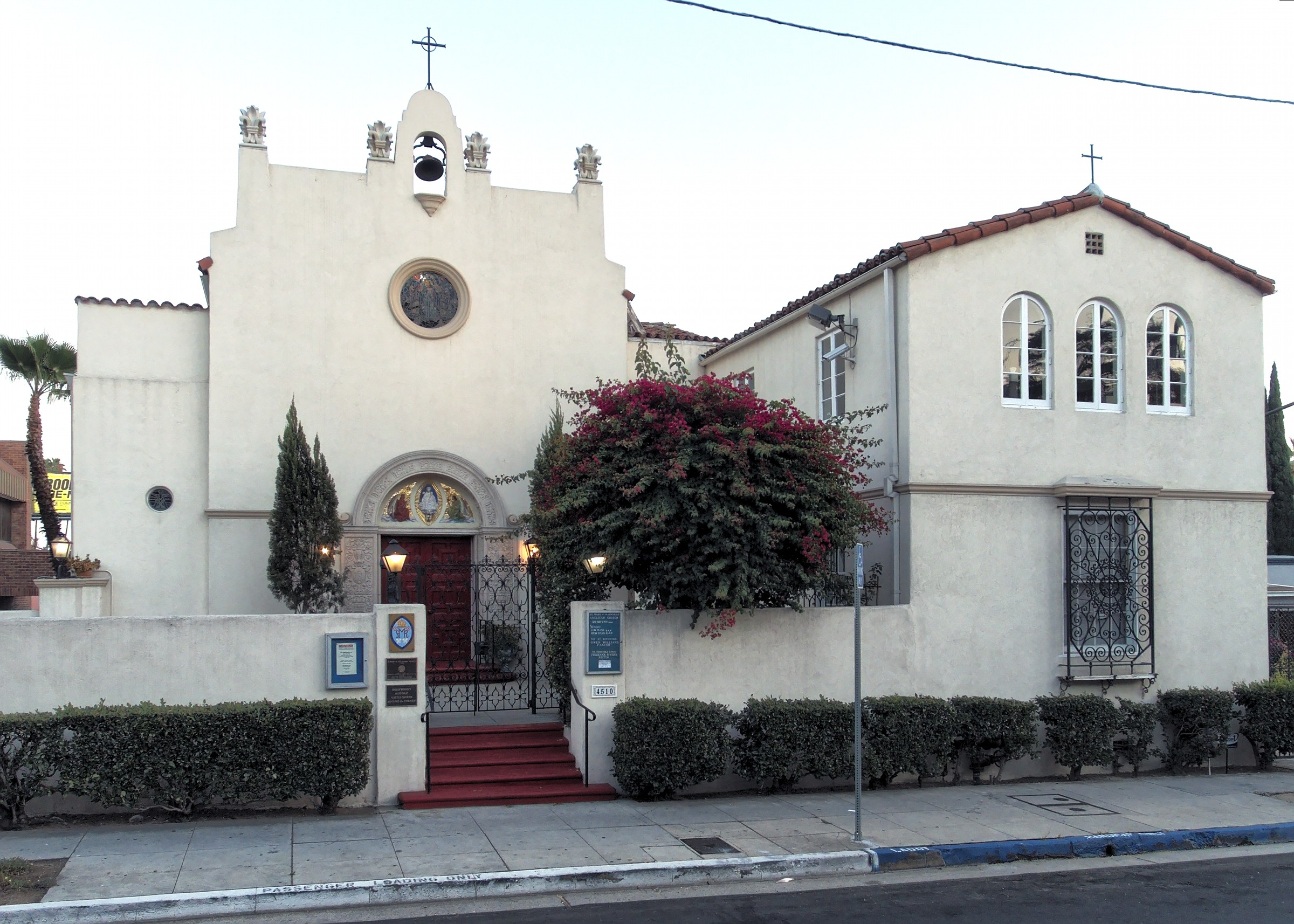
St. Mary of the Angels Church

The 2000 U.S. census counted 35,238 residents in the 2.61-square-mile neighborhood—an average of 13,512 people per square mile, among the highest population densities in Los Angeles County. In 2008 the city estimated that the population had increased to 36,933. The median age for residents was 36, older than in the city as a whole; the percentage of residents aged 65 and older was among the county's highest.

The neighborhood was highly diverse ethnically. The breakdown was whites, 57.6%; Latinos, 18.7%; Asians, 13.5%; blacks, 3.7%, and others, 6.6%. Armenia (25.3%) and Mexico (9.4%) were the most common places of birth for the 44.5% of the residents who were born abroad, a high ratio compared to the rest of Los Angeles.

The median yearly household income in 2008 dollars was $50,793, about the same as the rest of Los Angeles, but a high rate of households earned $20,000 or less per year. The average household size of two people was low for the city of Los Angeles. Renters occupied 75.5% of the housing stock, and house or apartment owners the rest.

The percentages of never-married men (50.2%) and never-married women (37.2%) were among the county's highest, as was the percentage of widowed women (10.1%).

== Communities ==
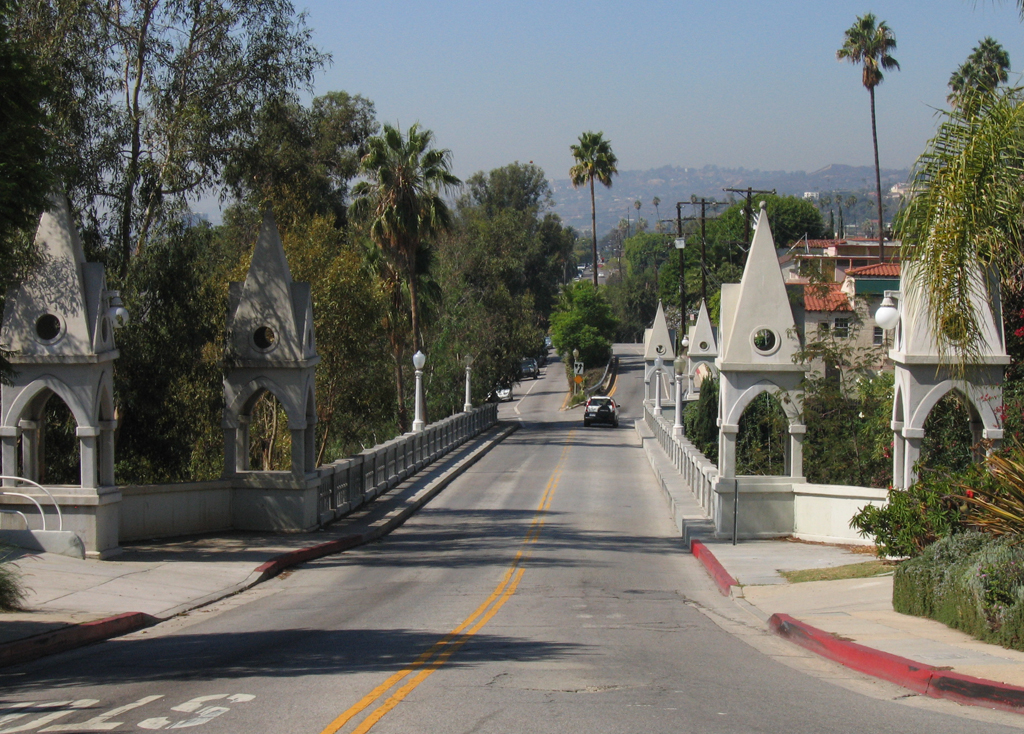
Shakespeare Bridge in the Franklin Hills area of Los Feliz.

The Los Feliz Neighborhood Council is divided into six interest areas, which include the following communities:

- District A: Los Feliz Hills and Los Feliz Estates
- District B: Los Feliz Square, Laughlin Park, and Thai Town North
- District C: Los Feliz Village
- District D: Los Feliz Knolls and Waverly Heights
- District E: Franklin Hills and a few neighboring blocks
- District F: West Los Feliz

The Oaks, a hilly neighborhood on the west side of Los Feliz bordering Griffith Park, is part of the Hollywood United Neighborhood Council. It is, however, within the boundaries of the Los Feliz Improvement Association.

=== Los Feliz Hills ===
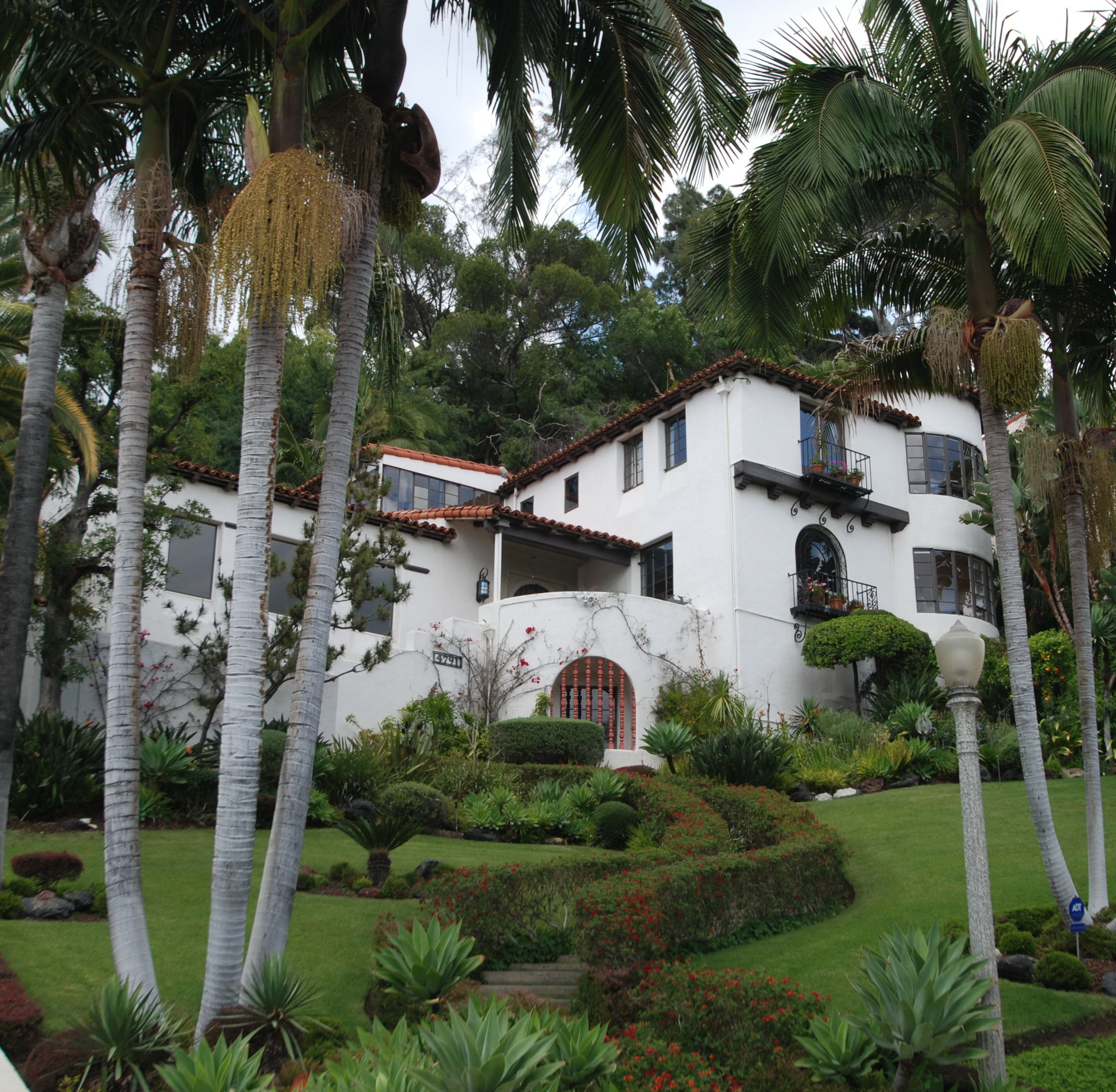
Blackburn House, designed by architect Paul R. Williams in 1927.

The area north of Los Feliz Boulevard below Griffith Park is commonly referred to as the Los Feliz Hills. The Los Feliz Hills contain multimillion-dollar homes and have been known for the large share of their inhabitants being involved in creative pursuits. The mean household income is $196,585.

The original subdivision of Los Feliz Heights was subdivided in 1921, from Los Feliz Boulevard north to Griffith Park, from Catalina to Vermont. The Los Feliz Heights Residential Historic District is significant for Period Revival architecture (including American Colonial, Spanish Colonial, Mediterranean, and Tudor Revival styles) from 1920 to 1949. The original subdivision of Hillhurst Park was between Los Feliz Boulevard and Griffith Park, from Vermont Avenue to Commonwealth Avenue. The original subdivision of Los Feliz Hills was to the east, abutting Riverside Drive, Los Feliz Boulevard, and Griffith Park.

=== Laughlin Park ===
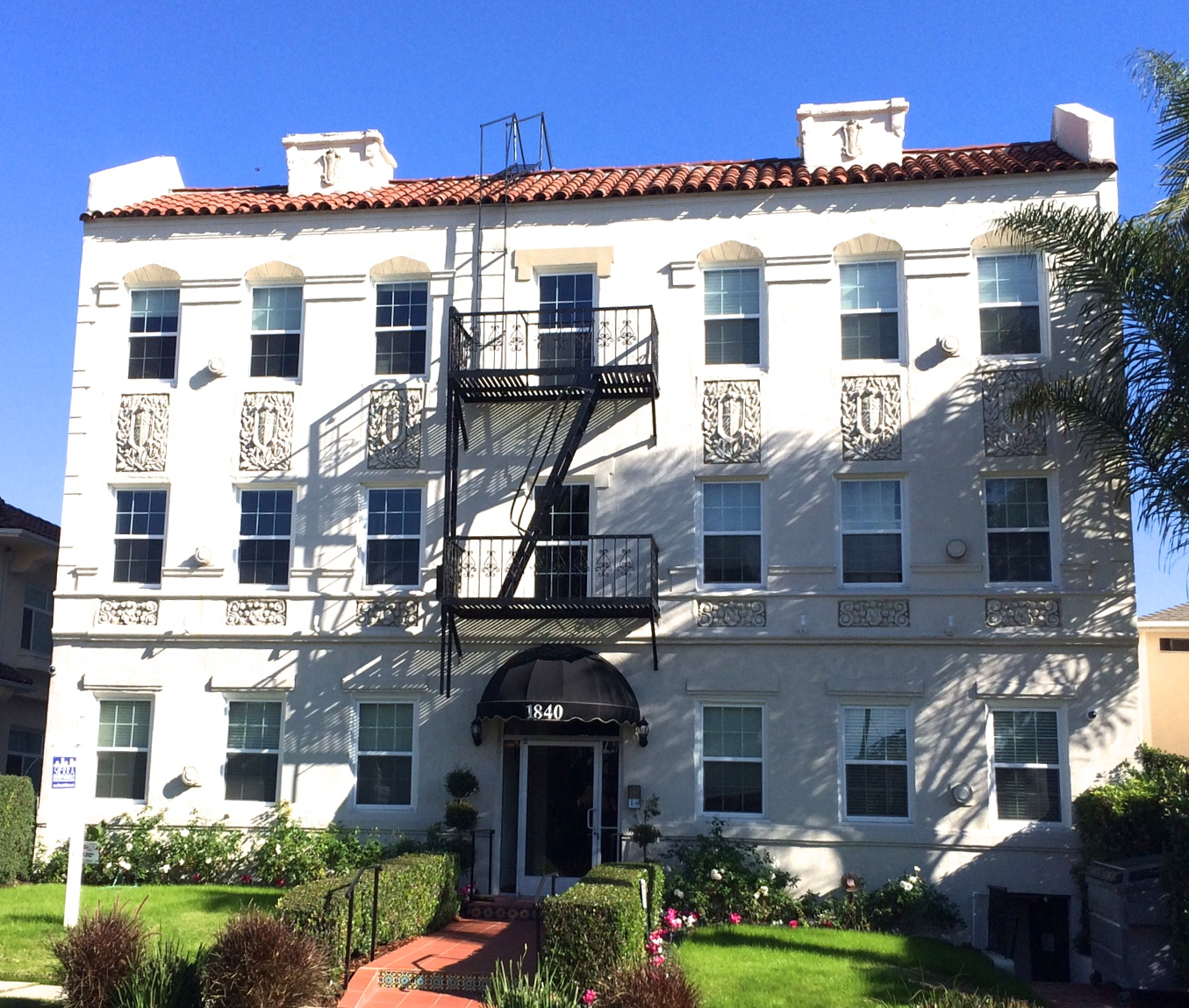
The Northmere, a historic Spanish Colonial Revival landmark.

The gated community of Laughlin Park has 60 houses. In 1998, Laura Meyers of Los Angeles Magazine described the area as "The most seductive, exclusive neighborhood in Los Feliz". W.C. Fields lived here in an Italianate residence built in 1919.

=== Los Feliz Village ===
Los Feliz Village is the southern section of Los Feliz, home to most of the commercial storefronts in the district. It is centered on the thoroughfares of Vermont and Hillhurst Avenues and spans from approximately Prospect Avenue to Los Feliz Boulevard. There are several coffee shops, restaurants, and small clothing and vintage stores.

Los Feliz Village Business Improvement District helps promote local businesses and has an annual street fair.

In February 2014, a local shop called Dumb Starbucks was opened as a bit for the Comedy Central show Nathan for You in Los Feliz Village. It has gained notoriety as a parody of Starbucks.

== Education ==
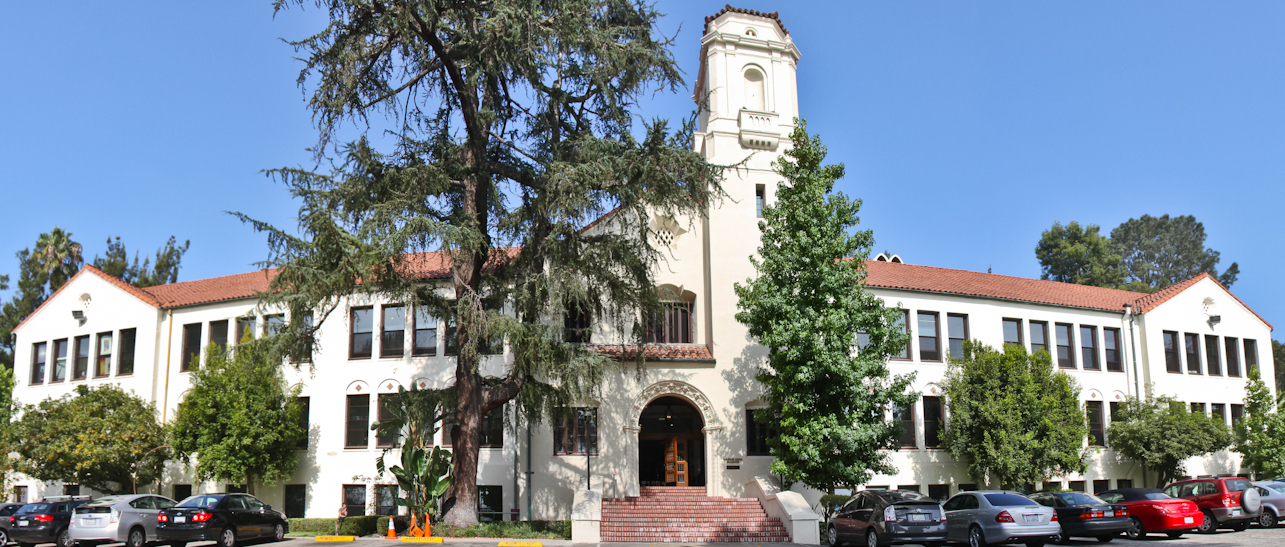
The American Film Institute, housed in a historic Spanish Colonial Revival building.

Forty-two percent of Los Feliz residents aged 25 and older had earned a four-year degree in 2000, a high figure for the city.

The schools within Los Feliz are as follows:

- John Marshall Senior High School, LAUSD, 3939 Tracy Street. Designed by architect George M. Lindsey in the Collegiate Gothic style, the school opened on January 26, 1931. After the Sylmar earthquake of 1971, some of Marshall's buildings were condemned. The cafeteria was torn down, but the Main Building was preserved. In 1975, it was closed for structural strengthening, and in September 1981 it was reopened. Mike Haynes Stadium, the school's football and track arena, dates to 1981 and was renovated with a regulation Olympic track and new turf field in 2010.
- Franklin Avenue Elementary School, LAUSD, 1910 North Commonwealth Avenue
- Los Feliz Elementary School, LAUSD, 1740 North New Hampshire Avenue
- Thomas Starr King Middle School, LAUSD, 4201 Fountain Avenue
- Our Mother of Good Counsel, private elementary, 4622 Ambrose Avenue
- Lycée International de Los Angeles Los Feliz campus, private elementary

In 1998, Laura Meyers of the Los Angeles Times said that residents of the Laughlin Park section of Los Feliz "tend not to send their kids to the local public schools" and instead "often" select the Lycée International or the Oaks School.

The Immaculate Heart school is in close proximity to the community.

== In popular culture ==
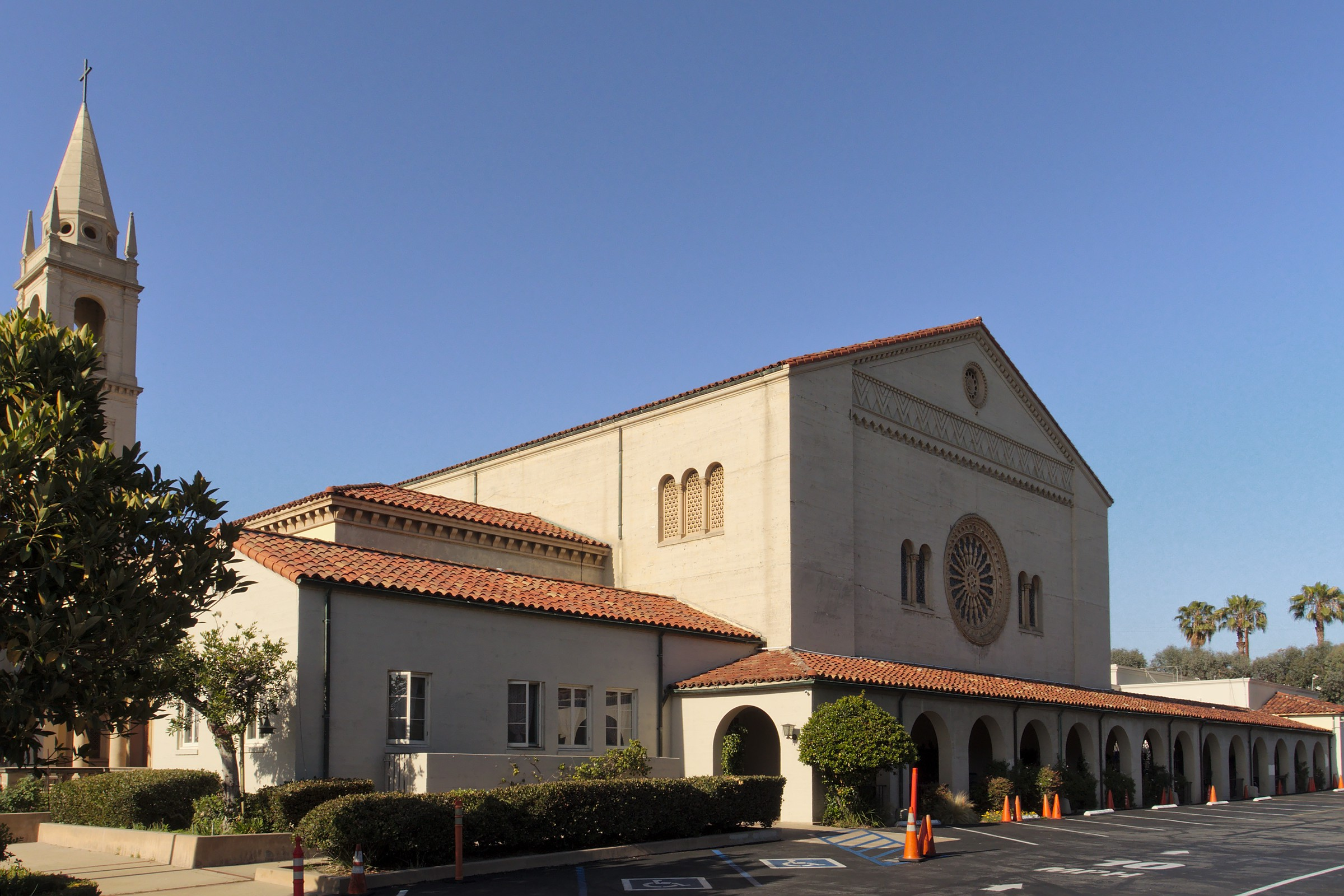
Los Angeles Full Gospel Church, previously used by Thirteenth Church of Christ, Scientist. Built in 1925.

Buena Vista Street, the entrance to the California Adventure theme park at the Disneyland Resort, is partly modeled after Los Feliz in the 1920s and 1930s. The Disney Buena Vista Street includes a retail location called Los Feliz Five and Dime. Disney's Hyperion studio was situated in the Los Feliz area where a Gelson's Market now stands.

In J.G. Quintel's series Close Enough, the main characters live in Los Feliz.

In Swingers, the main characters discuss their personal lives while playing at golf at Los Feliz 9-hole, par 3 golf course.

== See also ==
- Los Angeles Historic-Cultural Monuments in Hollywood and Los Feliz
