= Rincón Chileno =

Chilean restaurant in Los Angeles

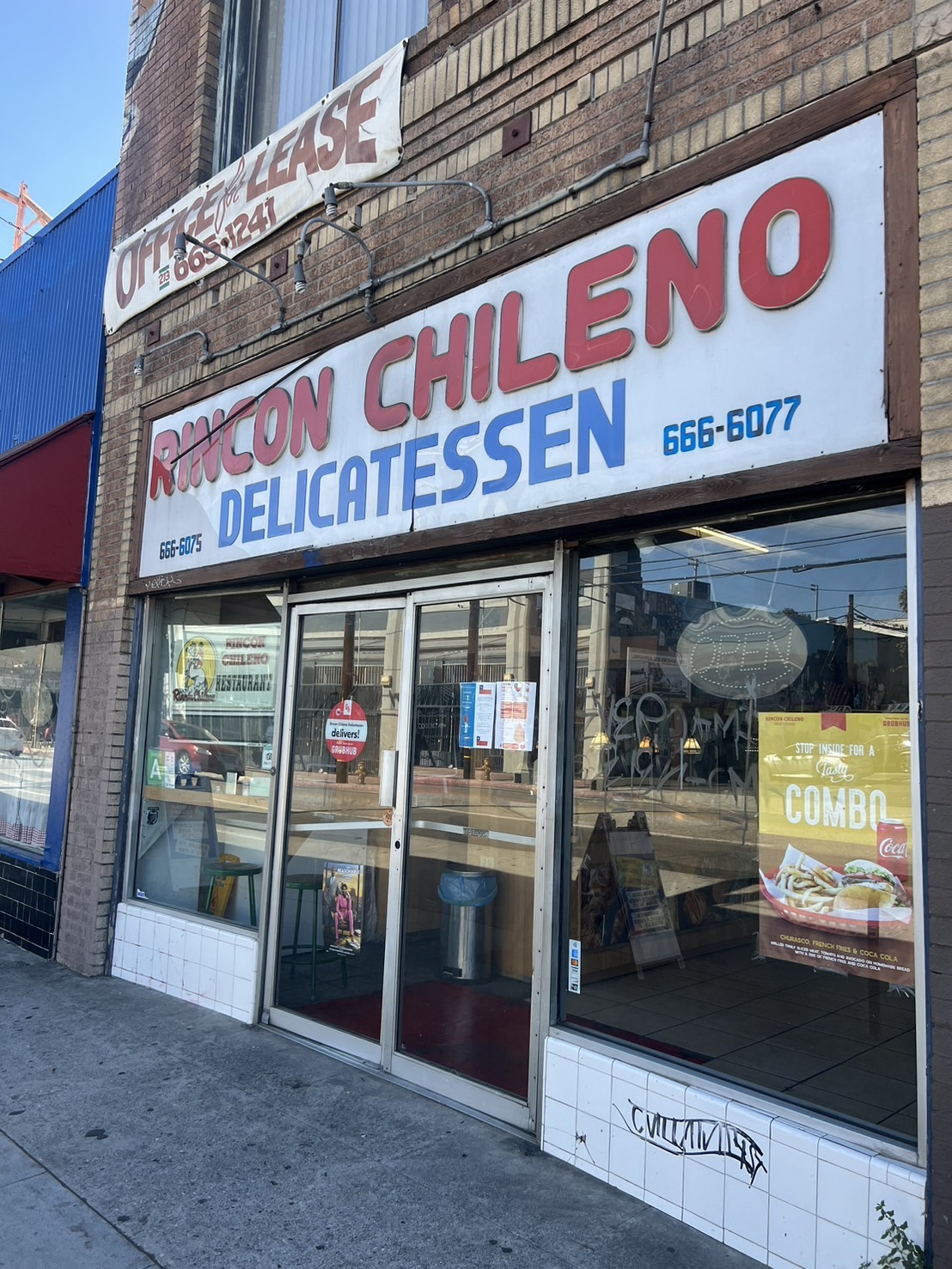
- Delicatessen and bakery entrance in 2024
- Interactive map of Rincón Chileno

Restaurant information
- Established: 1973
- Owners: Ricardo Flores; Cristina Flores
- Food type: Chilean
- Location: 4354 Melrose Avenue, Los Angeles, Los Angeles, California, 90029, United States
- Coordinates: 34°05′00″N 118°17′44″W
- Website: rinconchilenola.com

Rincón Chileno (Spanish pronunciation: [rinˈkon tʃiˈleno]; lit. 'Chilean nook') is a Chilean restaurant, delicatessen, and bakery in Los Angeles, California. Established in 1973, it is owned by Chilean immigrants Ricardo and Cristina Flores. After the 1973 Chilean coup d'état, it became a gathering place for the Chilean immigrant community in the Los Angeles area, who nicknamed it the "second Chilean consulate".

== History ==
Ricardo and Cristina Flores, Rincón Chileno's owners, first came to the United States as newlyweds from Chile in 1969. Originally their intentions were to stay in the United States temporarily, then return to Chile in order to raise their family. However, upon their return the country was in an economic depression caused by the Vuskovic plan and American opposition against the presidency of Salvador Allende. Ricardo and Cristina Flores chose to immigrate permanently to the United States; Ricardo later brought his mother and stepfather.

Rincón Chileno was established in 1973. It had originated from Ricardo's mother and stepfather, who prepared and served traditional food to the members of a local Chilean club in Los Angeles. When a pair of commercial spaces on Melrose Avenue became available, they rented them and set up a restaurant with an adjoining delicatessen and bakery.

Initially, Rincón Chileno had few customers. After the 1973 Chilean coup d'état, which led many Chileans to immigrate to the Los Angeles area, business improved. Because many of the newly arrived immigrants had been both supporters and opponents of Allende, Flores resolved to maintain his business politically neutral. "I tell my children and my wife, we don't talk politics here", he said in 2018. "We have to serve this and that side".

In the years immediately following the coup, Rincón Chileno became a gathering place for the Chilean community in the Los Angeles area. Aside from food, it also sold Chilean periodicals, became a source for exchanging news from home, and provided Chilean immigrants with help in acclimating to the United States. As a result, it was nicknamed the "second Chilean consulate" in Los Angeles. In a 1993 review for the Los Angeles Times, the food critic Jonathan Gold said that "Rincón Chileno is as much community center as it is a restaurant". "Thank God that Rincón Chileno fulfilled a task in that time of unifying Chileans a bit and that makes me feel good", Flores said in 2023.

A second Rincón Chileno location opened in suburban Lawndale.

== Menu ==
Rincón Chileno specializes in traditional Chilean cuisine. Among the dishes that have received commentary from the press include its congrio frito, a dish of fried cusk-eel. Gold, who praised the dish, described it as "like nothing so much as something off an oversize fish 'n' chips platter, sided with a chopped tomato salad that is like a Chilean pico de gallo".

In 1987, the Los Angeles Times referred to Rincón Chileno's pastel de choclo as its most popular item. It also said that it was probably the only place in the Los Angeles area where one could order erizos al matico, a sea urchin dish served with pebre. Gold wrote in 1993 that it was "delicious, crammed full of aphrodisiac nutrients, but really too rich to eat more than a few bites of—even if you are trying to preserve the honor of your country". Its humitas and pan amasado have also been favorably commented on. The latter was described by the Los Angeles Times in 1984 as being "like expanded versions of the baking powder biscuits your mother and/or grandmother probably used to make".

Rincón Chileno's empanadas were listed among the best in Los Angeles by LAist in 2016.

== Reception ==
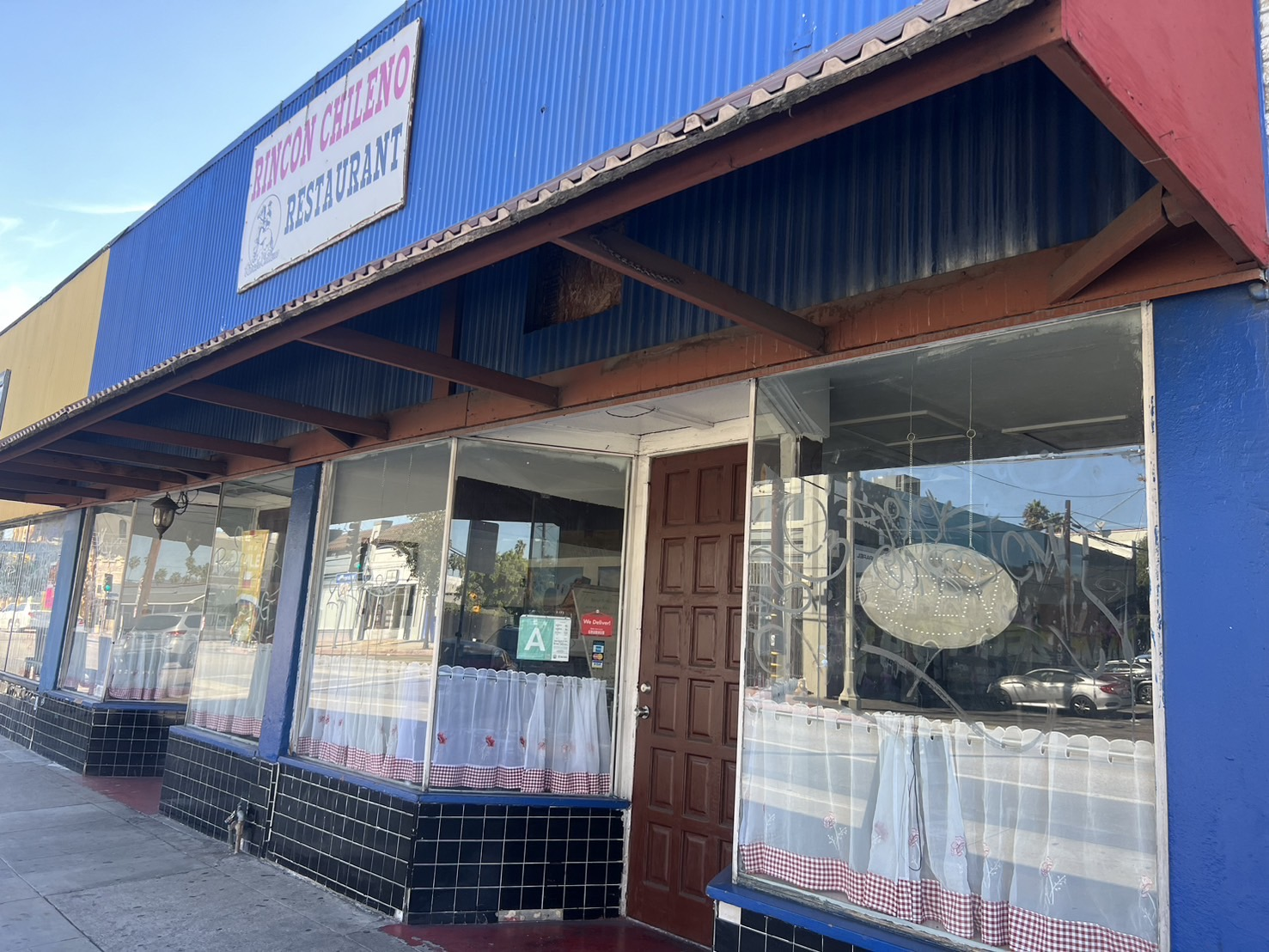
Exterior of Rincón Chileno's restaurant

In a 1977 review for the LA Weekly, Jack Livingston wrote that he felt as if he had "stepped into a time warp" upon entering Rincón Chileno, which he described as being like "some local cafe on a summer street in Valparaíso, circa 1937". A 1985 Los Angeles Times review said that Rincón Chileno attracted business from students at Los Angeles City College.

Gold described the restaurant in 1993:

Rincón Chileno is an old-fashioned ethnic restaurant on the eastern end of Melrose, famous in its day as a place for an exotic date, closer in atmosphere to the Latin restaurants in New York's West Village than to the divier yet ultra-authentic places you now expect in Hollywood.

He added that the wait to get seated without a reservation would permit him the opportunity to browse the delicatessen and bakery next door for a "car picnic". Because of that he said that it was "conceivably the only restaurant in [Los Angeles] where it can be pleasurable to be turned away".
