= Santa Monica, California =

Coastal city in Los Angeles County, California

- City
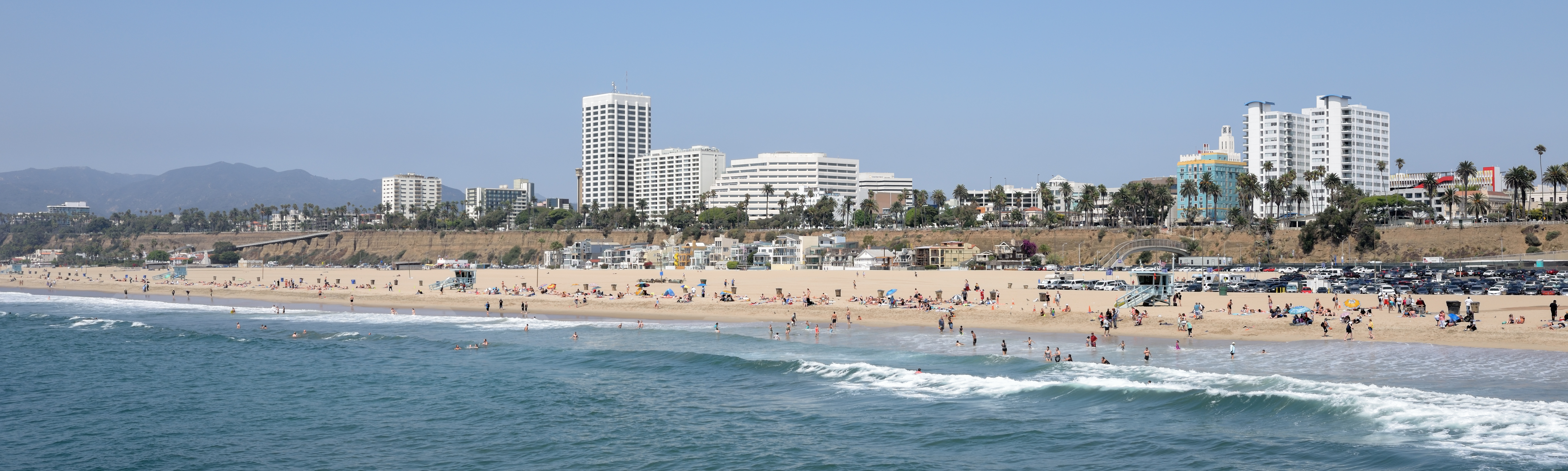
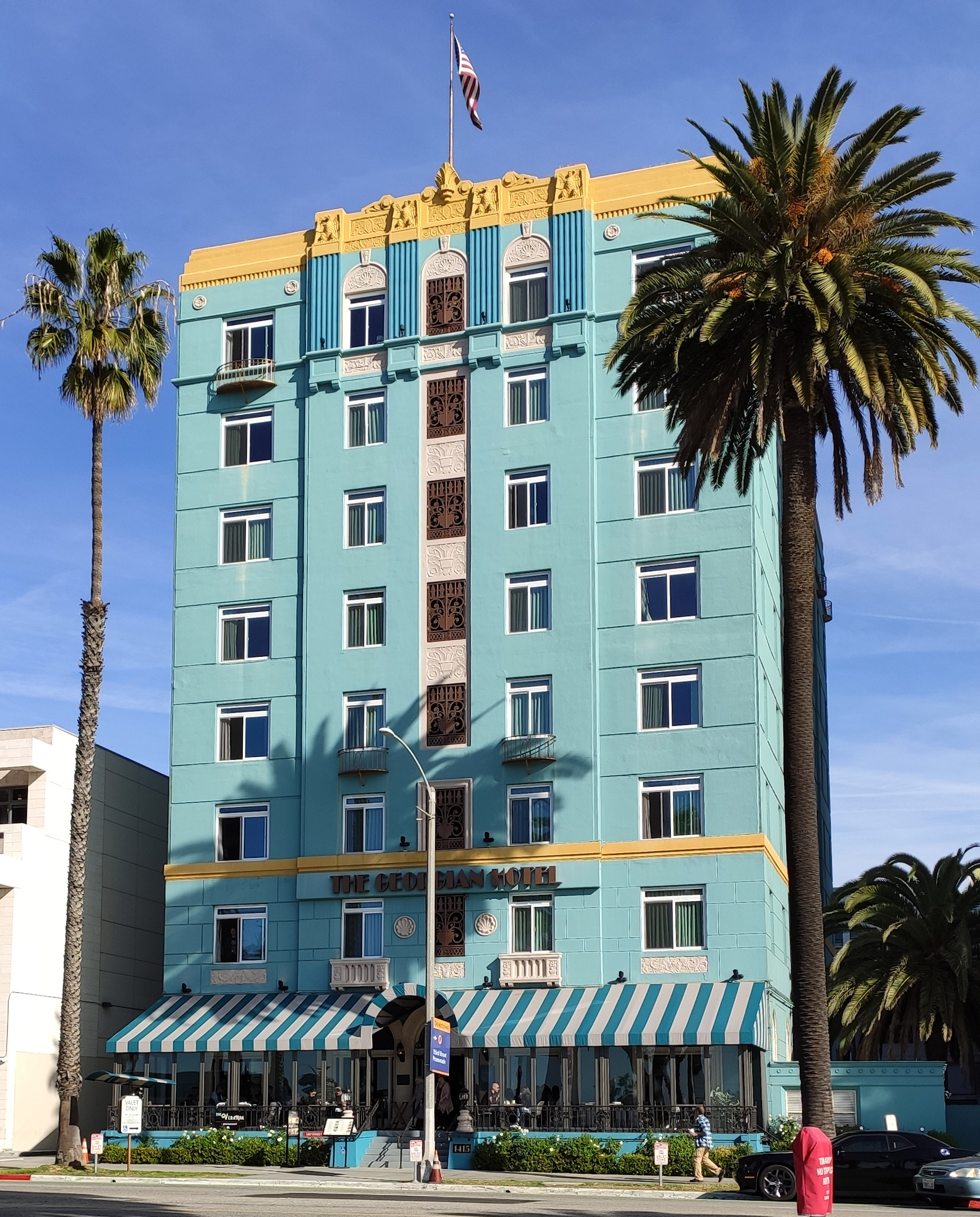
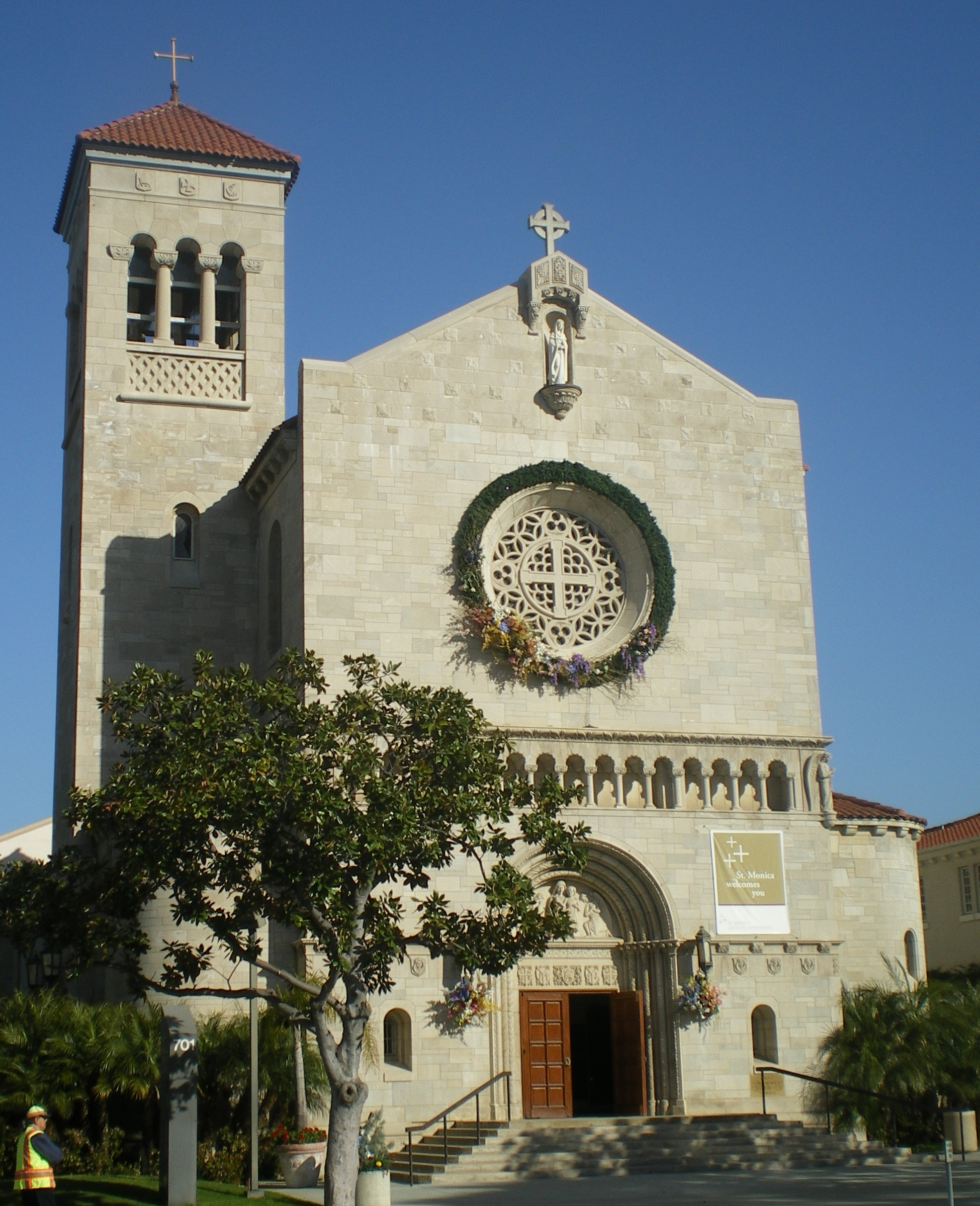
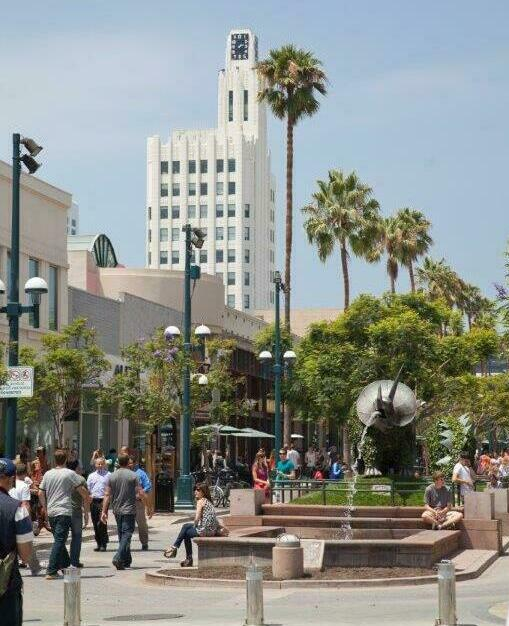
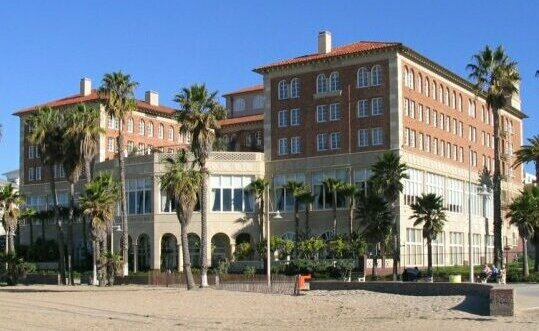
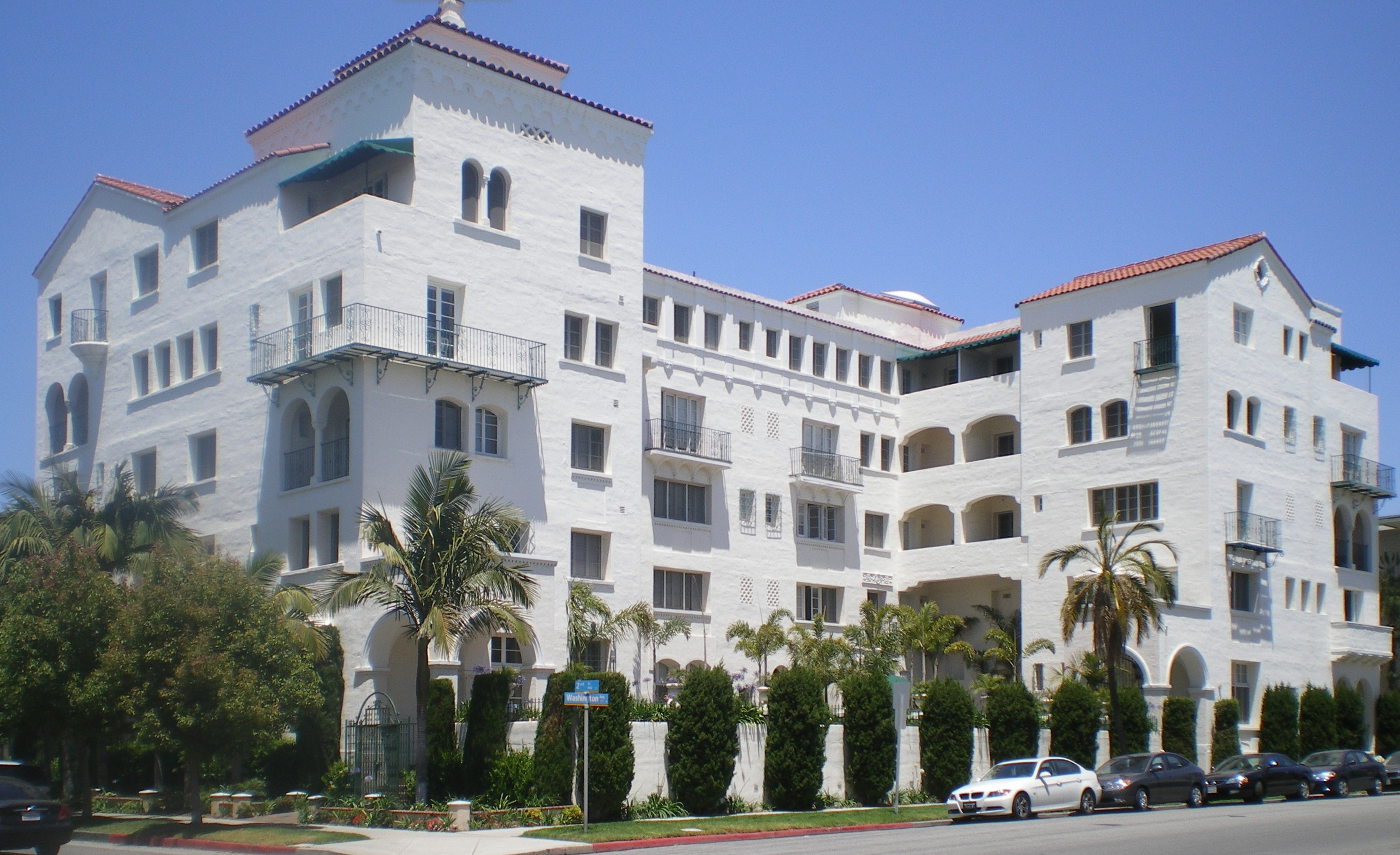
- Santa Monica State Beach Georgian Hotel St. Monica Church Third Street Promenade Hotel Casa del Mar Sovereign Hotel

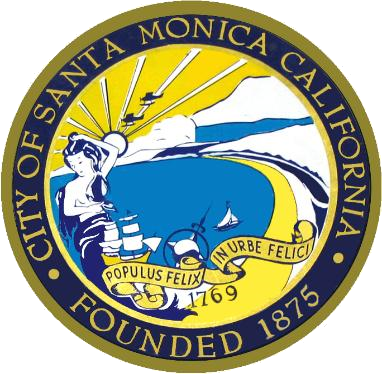
- Seal
- Nickname: SaMo
- Motto: Populus felix in urbe felice (Latin for 'Happy people in a happy city' / 'Fortunate people in a fortunate land')
- Coordinates: 34°01′19″N 118°28′53″W
- Country: United States
- State: California
- County: Los Angeles
- Spanish encampment: August 3, 1769
- Incorporated: November 30, 1886
- Named for: Saint Monica

Government
  - Type: Council–manager
  - Mayor: Caroline Torosis
  - Mayor Pro Tem: Jesse Zwick
  - Santa Monica City Council: Dan Hall, Ellis Raskin, Barry Snell, Natalya Zernitskaya, Lana Negrete
  - City Manager: Oliver Chi

Area
  - Total: 16.00 sq mi (41.43 km^{2})
  - Land: 8.42 sq mi (21.80 km^{2})
  - Water: 7.58 sq mi (19.64 km^{2})
- Elevation: 105 ft (32 m)

Population (2020)
  - Total: 93,076
  - Rank: 91st in California
  - Density: 11,067/sq mi (4,273/km^{2})
- Time zone: UTC−8 (Pacific)
  - Summer (DST): UTC−7 (PDT)
- ZIP Codes: 90401–90411
- Area codes: 310/424
- FIPS code: 06-70000
- GNIS feature IDs: 1652792, 2411825
- Website: www.santamonica.gov

Santa Monica (Spanish: Santa Mónica, lit. 'Saint Monica') is a city in Los Angeles County, California, United States. It is situated along Santa Monica Bay on California's South Coast. As of the 2020 census, Santa Monica had a population of 93,076. Companies including Hulu, Activision Blizzard, Game Show Network, Universal Music Group, Starz Entertainment, Lionsgate Studios, Illumination, and Snap Inc. are headquartered in Santa Monica.

Santa Monica traces its history to Rancho San Vicente y Santa Mónica, granted in 1839 to the Sepúlveda family of California. The rancho was later sold to John P. Jones and Robert Baker, who, in 1875, along with his Californio heiress wife Arcadia Bandini de Stearns Baker, founded Santa Monica, which incorporated as a city in 1886. The city developed into a seaside resort during the late 19th and early 20th centuries, with the creation of tourist attractions such as Palisades Park, the Santa Monica Pier, Ocean Park, and the Hotel Casa del Mar. It is bounded by the City of Los Angeles on all sides except for the western part, which is bordered by the Pacific Ocean.

== History ==
=== Indigenous ===
The Tongva are indigenous to the Santa Monica area. The village of Comicranga was established in the Santa Monica area. One of the village's notable residents was Victoria Reid, who was the daughter of the chief of the village. During the Spanish period, she was taken to Mission San Gabriel from her parents at the age of six.

=== Spanish era ===
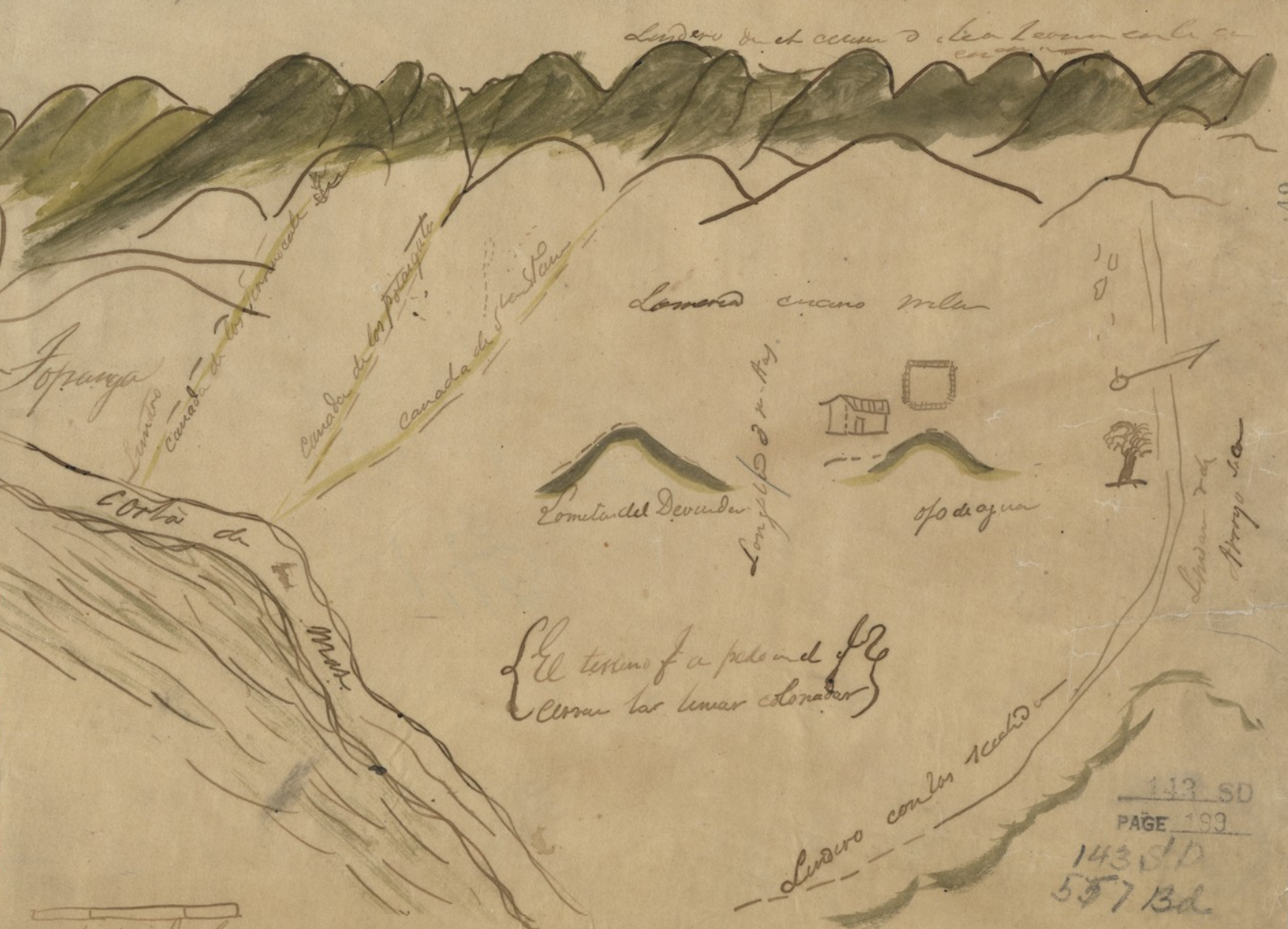
Rancho San Vicente y Santa Mónica was granted in 1839 to the Sepúlveda family of California.

The first non-indigenous group to set foot in the area was the party of explorer Gaspar de Portolá, which camped near the present-day intersection of Barrington and Ohio Avenues on August 3, 1769.

There are two different accounts of how the city's name came to be. One says it was named in honor of the feast day of Saint Monica (mother of Saint Augustine), but her feast day is May 4. Another version says it was named by Juan Crespí on account of a pair of springs, the Kuruvungna Springs, that were reminiscent of the tears Saint Monica shed over her son's early impiety.

=== Mexican era ===
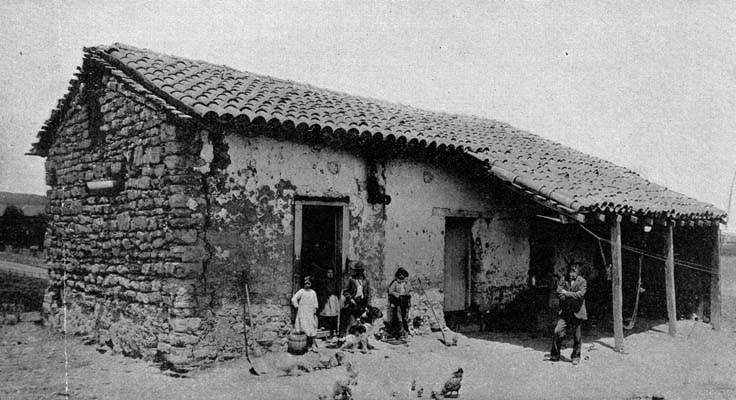
1840 adobe home in Santa Monica

In 1839, Governor Juan Bautista Alvarado granted Rancho San Vicente y Santa Mónica to Francisco Sepúlveda II, of the Sepúlveda family of California. As the definitions of the rancho grant were not precise, the Sepúlveda family came into conflict with the neighboring Rancho Boca de Santa Mónica, owned by Ysidro Reyes and Francisco Márquez. A small Californio community grew up on Rancho San Vicente y Santa Mónica, made up primarily of vaqueros working on the rancho and their families.

=== Post-conquest era ===
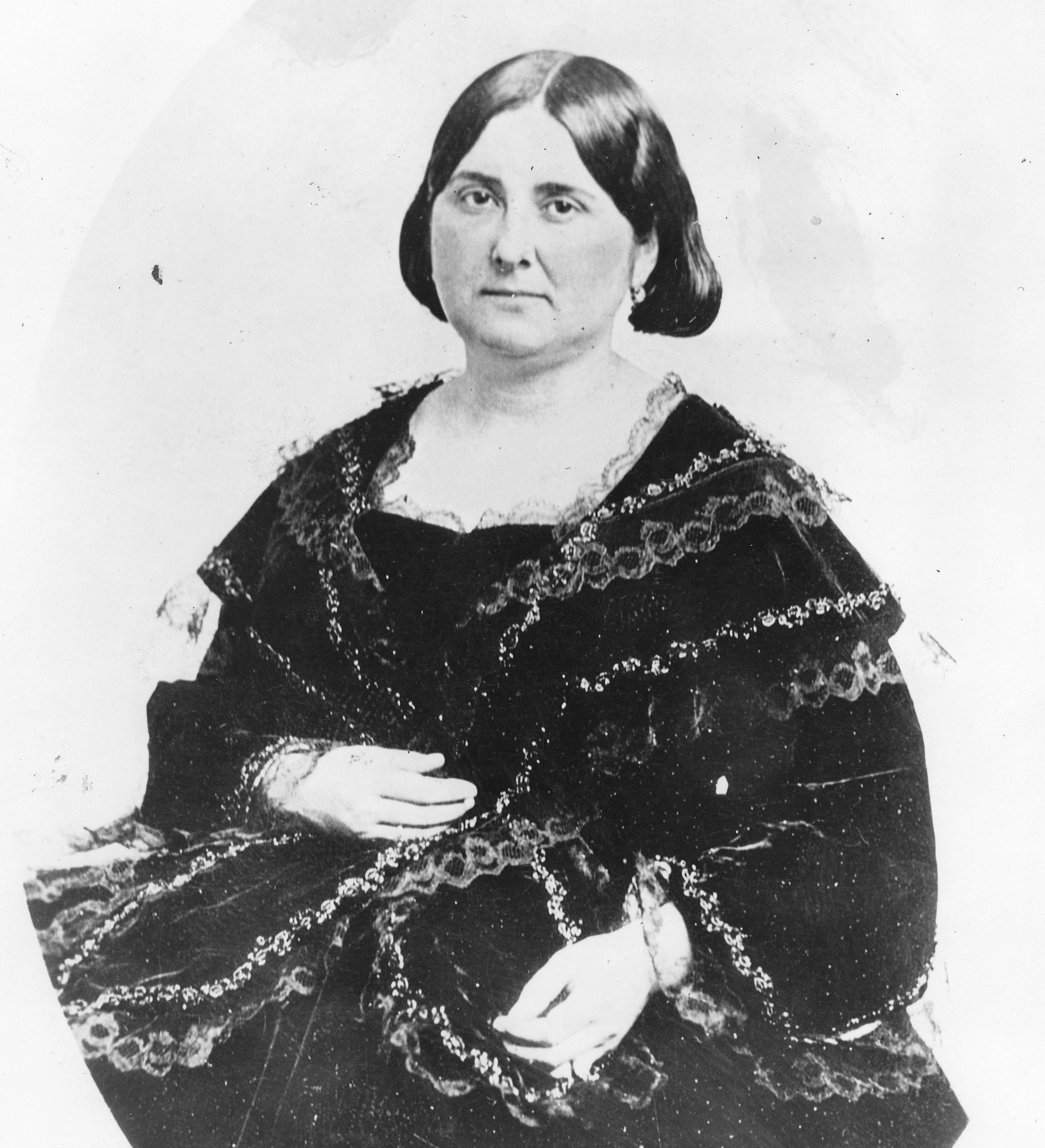
Arcadia Bandini de Baker, a prominent Californio heiress, is known as the "Godmother of Santa Monica" for her role in founding the city.

After the American conquest of California, Mexico signed the Treaty of Guadalupe Hidalgo, which gave Mexicans and Californios living in the state certain unalienable rights. U.S. government sovereignty in California began on February 2, 1848.

In the 1870s, the Los Angeles and Independence Railroad connected Santa Monica with Los Angeles, and a wharf out into the bay. The first town hall was an 1873 brick building, later a beer hall, and now part of the Santa Monica Hostel. By 1885, the town's first hotel was the Santa Monica Hotel.

Amusement piers became popular in the first decades of the 20th century, and the extensive Pacific Electric Railway brought people to the city's beaches from across the Greater Los Angeles Area.

Around the start of the 20th century, a growing population of Asian Americans lived in and around Santa Monica and Venice. A Japanese fishing village was near the Long Wharf, while small numbers of Chinese lived or worked in Santa Monica and Venice. The two ethnic minorities were often viewed differently by White Americans, who were often well-disposed toward the Japanese but condescending to the Chinese. The Japanese village fishermen were an integral economic part of the Santa Monica Bay community.

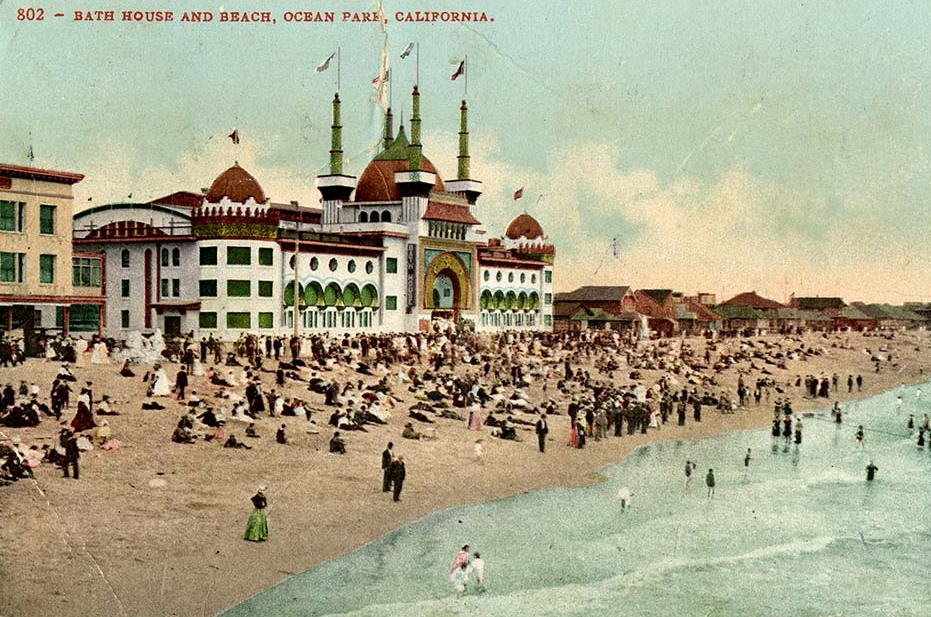
Ocean Park bathhouse, c. 1907

Donald Wills Douglas Sr. built a plant in 1922 at Clover Field (Santa Monica Airport) for the Douglas Aircraft Company. In 1924, four Douglas-built planes took off from Clover Field to attempt the first aerial circumnavigation of the world. Two planes returned after covering 27,553 miles (44,342 km) in 175 days, and were greeted on their return on September 23, 1924, by a crowd of 200,000. The Douglas Company (later McDonnell Douglas) kept facilities in the city until the 1970s.

The Great Depression hit Santa Monica deeply. One report gives citywide employment in 1933 of just 1,000. Hotels and office building owners went bankrupt. In the 1930s, corruption infected Santa Monica (along with neighboring Los Angeles). The federal Works Project Administration helped build several buildings, most notably City Hall. The main Post Office and Barnum Hall (Santa Monica High School auditorium) were also among other WPA projects.

=== Modern era ===
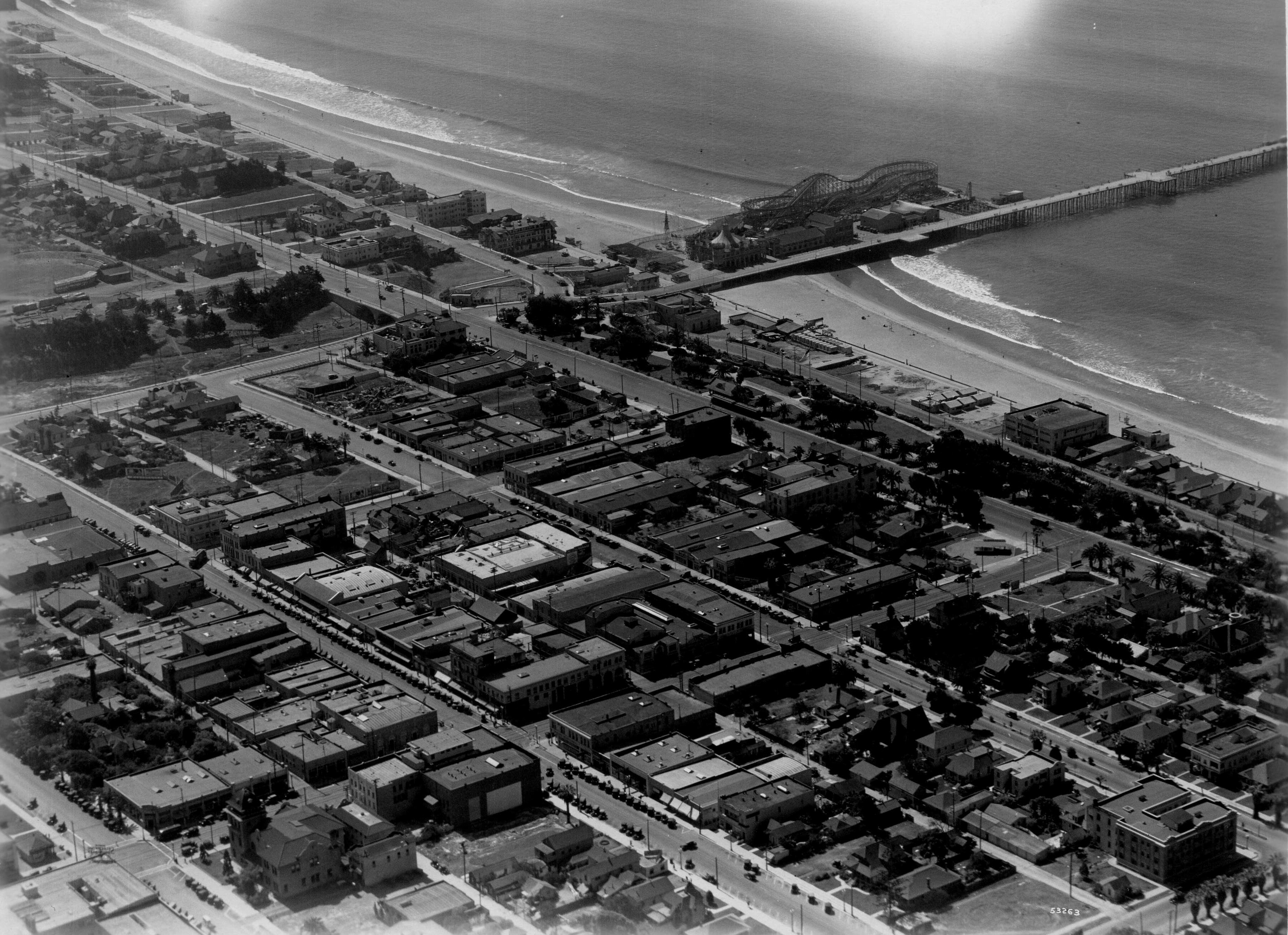
Aerial view of Santa Monica, c. 1941

Douglas's business grew with the onset of World War II, employing as many as 44,000 people in 1943. To defend against air attack, set designers from the Warner Brothers Studios prepared elaborate camouflage that disguised the factory and airfield. The RAND Corporation began as a project of the Douglas Company in 1945, and spun off into an independent think tank on May 14, 1948. RAND acquired a 15-acre (61,000 m^{2}) campus across the street from the Civic Center and is still there today.

The completion of the Santa Monica Civic Auditorium in 1958 eliminated Belmar, the first African American community in the city, and the Santa Monica Freeway in 1966 decimated the Pico neighborhood that had been a leading African American enclave on the Westside.

Beach volleyball is believed to have been developed by Duke Kahanamoku in Santa Monica during the 1920s.

Santa Monica has two hospitals: Saint John's Health Center and Santa Monica-UCLA Medical Center. Its cemetery is Woodlawn Memorial.

Santa Monica has several local newspapers, including Santa Monica Daily Press, Santa Monica Mirror, and Santa Monica Star.

== Geography ==
Santa Monica rests on a mostly flat slope that angles down toward Ocean Avenue and toward the south. High bluffs separate the north side of the city from the beaches. Santa Monica borders the L.A. neighborhoods of Pacific Palisades to the north and Venice to the south. To the west, Santa Monica has a 3-mile (4.8 km) coastline fronting Santa Monica Bay, and to the east of the city are the L.A. communities of West Los Angeles and Brentwood.

=== Climate ===
View of Santa Monica Pier

Santa Monica has a coastal Mediterranean climate (Köppen: Csb). It receives an average of 310 days of sunshine a year. It is in USDA plant hardiness zone 11a. Because of its location, nestled on the vast and open Santa Monica Bay, morning fog is a common phenomenon in May, June, July and early August (caused by ocean temperature variations and currents). Like other inhabitants of the greater Los Angeles area, residents have a particular terminology for this phenomenon: the "May Gray", the "June Gloom", and even "Fogust". Overcast skies are common on June mornings, but usually the strong sun burns the fog off by noon. In the late winter/early summer, daily fog is a phenomenon, too. It happens suddenly and it may last some hours or past sunset time. Nonetheless, it will sometimes stay cloudy and cool all day during June, even as other parts of the Los Angeles area experience sunny skies and warmer temperatures. At times, the sun can be shining east of 20th Street while the beach area is overcast. As a general rule, the beach temperature is from 5 to 10 degrees Fahrenheit (3 to 6 degrees Celsius) cooler than it is inland during summer days, and 5 to 10 degrees warmer during winter nights.

It is also in September that the highest temperatures tend to be reached. It is winter, however, when the hot, dry winds of the Santa Anas are most common. In contrast, temperatures exceeding 10 degrees below average are rare.

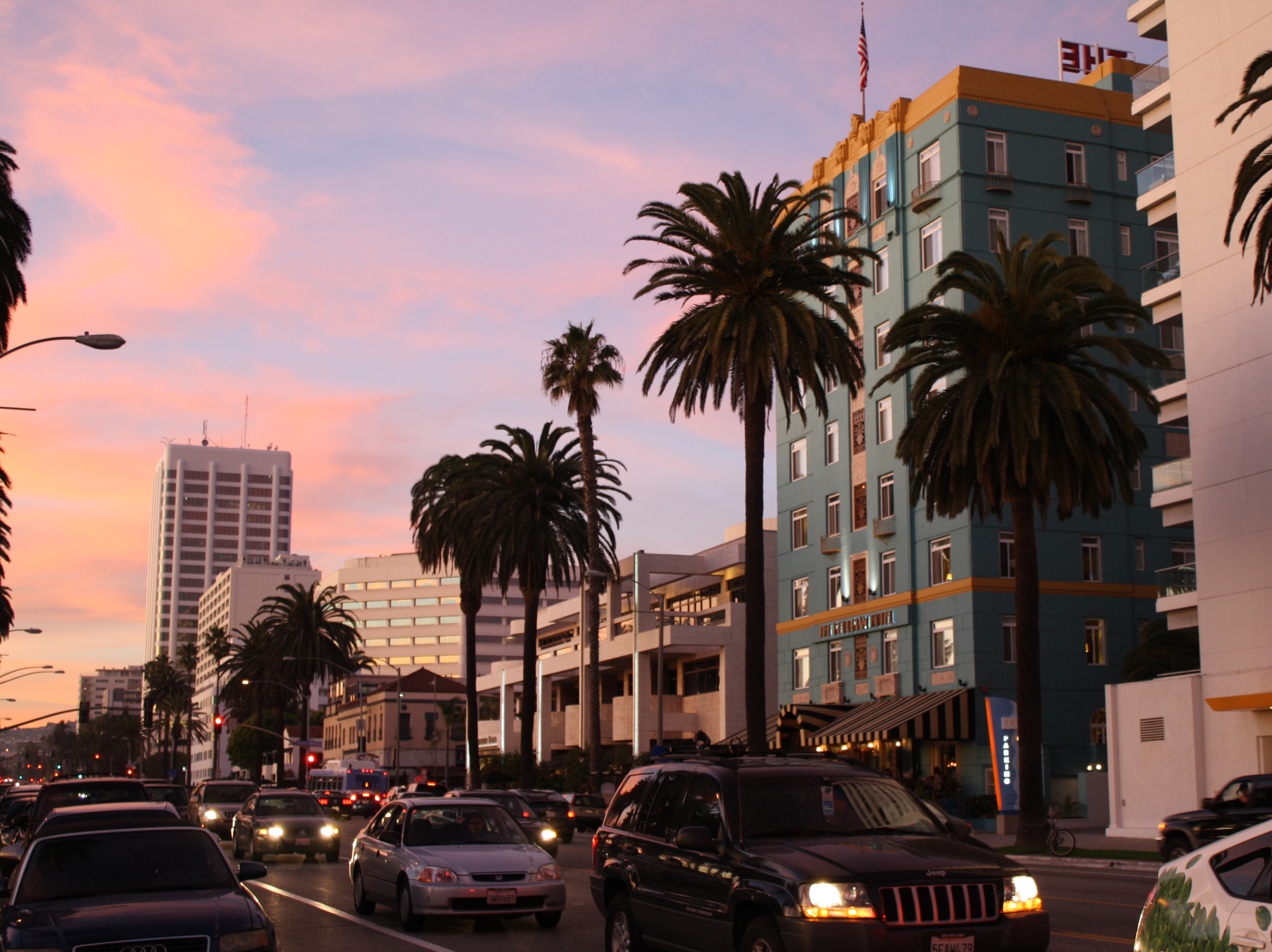
Ocean Avenue at sunset

The rainy season is from late October through late March. Winter storms usually approach from the northwest and pass quickly through the Southland. There is very little rain during the rest of the year. Yearly rainfall totals are unpredictable, as rainy years are occasionally followed by droughts. There has never been any snow or frost, but there has been hail.

Santa Monica usually enjoys cool breezes blowing in from the ocean, which tend to keep the air fresh and clean. Therefore, smog is less of a problem for Santa Monica than elsewhere around Los Angeles. However, from September through November, the Santa Ana winds sometimes blow from the east, bringing smoggy and hot inland air to the beaches.

The hottest temperature ever reported in Santa Monica was 100 °F (38 °C) on November 1, 1966, while the lowest is 33 °F (1 °C) on March 1, 1945, and again on March 21, 1952. The highest minimum temperature is 72 °F (22 °C) on October 24, 2007, and the lowest maximum temperature is 51 °F (11 °C) on 4 dates in February 2001 and again on March 10, 2006. The snowiest months on record are January 1954 and March 1955, both with trace amounts. They are the only months to report any snowfall. Many months have reported no rainfall at all. Conversely, the wettest month on record is January 1995 with a total of 17.82 inches (453 mm) of rainfall. The wettest year on record is 1998, with a total of 25.4 inches (650 mm) of rainfall; the driest is 1989, with a total of 4.04 inches (103 mm) of rainfall.

Climate data for Santa Monica, California (Santa Monica Pier), 1991–2020 normals, extremes 1937–2013
Month	Jan	Feb	Mar	Apr	May	Jun	Jul	Aug	Sep	Oct	Nov	Dec	Year
Record high °F (°C)	85 (29)	89 (32)	90 (32)	91 (33)	93 (34)	92 (33)	91 (33)	95 (35)	100 (38)	99 (37)	100 (38)	89 (32)	100 (38)
Mean maximum °F (°C)	77.0 (25.0)	76.8 (24.9)	73.3 (22.9)	77.1 (25.1)	72.0 (22.2)	73.2 (22.9)	76.2 (24.6)	76.8 (24.9)	79.8 (26.6)	83.9 (28.8)	79.9 (26.6)	75.4 (24.1)	88.2 (31.2)
Mean daily maximum °F (°C)	62.0 (16.7)	62.2 (16.8)	61.8 (16.6)	63.4 (17.4)	63.4 (17.4)	66.3 (19.1)	69.4 (20.8)	69.7 (20.9)	70.0 (21.1)	67.5 (19.7)	66.9 (19.4)	63.4 (17.4)	65.5 (18.6)
Daily mean °F (°C)	55.8 (13.2)	56.0 (13.3)	56.8 (13.8)	58.3 (14.6)	59.6 (15.3)	62.7 (17.1)	65.4 (18.6)	66.0 (18.9)	65.5 (18.6)	63.0 (17.2)	60.3 (15.7)	56.5 (13.6)	60.5 (15.8)
Mean daily minimum °F (°C)	49.6 (9.8)	49.7 (9.8)	51.8 (11.0)	53.2 (11.8)	55.8 (13.2)	59.2 (15.1)	61.5 (16.4)	62.3 (16.8)	60.9 (16.1)	58.5 (14.7)	53.6 (12.0)	49.5 (9.7)	55.5 (13.0)
Mean minimum °F (°C)	43.6 (6.4)	44.8 (7.1)	46.0 (7.8)	48.2 (9.0)	51.9 (11.1)	55.8 (13.2)	58.9 (14.9)	59.3 (15.2)	57.9 (14.4)	53.9 (12.2)	47.7 (8.7)	44.0 (6.7)	41.6 (5.3)
Record low °F (°C)	34 (1)	35 (2)	33 (1)	39 (4)	43 (6)	45 (7)	49 (9)	51 (11)	44 (7)	42 (6)	37 (3)	34 (1)	33 (1)
Average precipitation inches (mm)	3.08 (78)	3.10 (79)	1.74 (44)	0.57 (14)	0.23 (5.8)	0.05 (1.3)	0.03 (0.76)	0.01 (0.25)	0.03 (0.76)	0.49 (12)	0.81 (21)	2.03 (52)	12.17 (308.87)
Average precipitation days (≥ 0.01 in)	6.8	6.9	4.9	2.1	1.4	0.9	0.5	0.4	0.4	1.9	2.4	5.0	33.6
Source 1: NOAA
Source 2: National Weather Service (mean maxima/minima 1981–2010)

=== Environment ===
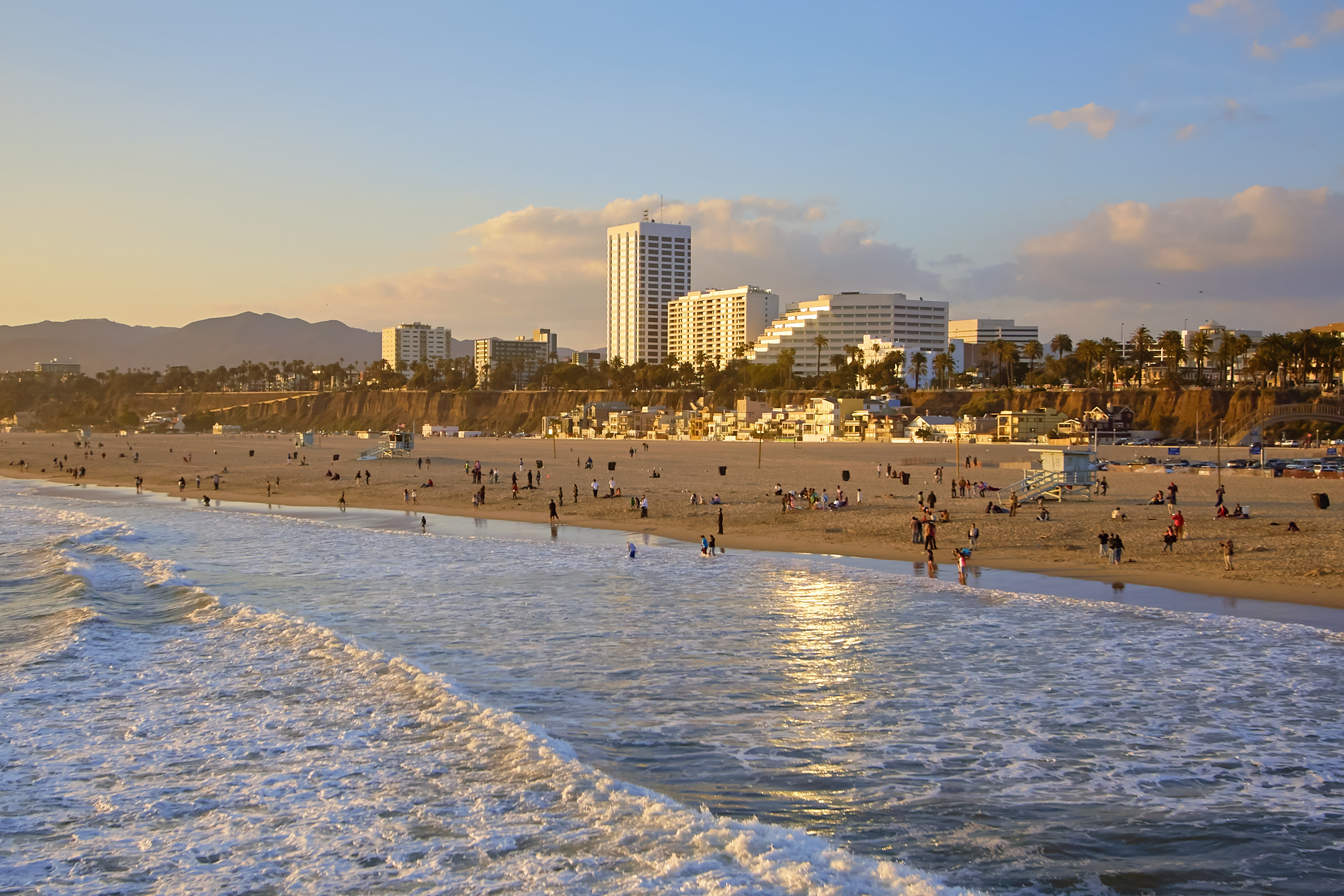
View of the city's beaches from Santa Monica Bay

The city first proposed its Sustainable City Plan in 1992 and in 1994, was one of the first cities in the nation to formally adopt a comprehensive sustainability plan, setting waste reduction and water conservation policies for both public and private sector through its Office of Sustainability and the Environment. Eighty-two percent of the city's public works vehicles run on alternative fuels, including most of the municipal bus system, making it among the largest of such fleets in the country. Santa Monica fleet vehicles and buses source their natural gas from Redeem, a Southern California-based supplier of renewable and sustainable natural gas obtained from non-fracked methane biogas generated from organic landfill waste.

Santa Monica adopted a Community Energy Independence Initiative to achieve complete energy independence by 2020 (vs. California's already ambitious 33% renewables goal). The city exceeded that aspiration when, in February 2019, it switched over to electricity from the Clean Power Alliance, with a citywide default of 100% renewably sourced energy. That same year, the Santa Monica City Council adopted a Climate Action and Adaptation Plan aimed at achieving an 80% cut in carbon emissions by 2030, and reaching community-wide carbon neutrality by 2050 or sooner.

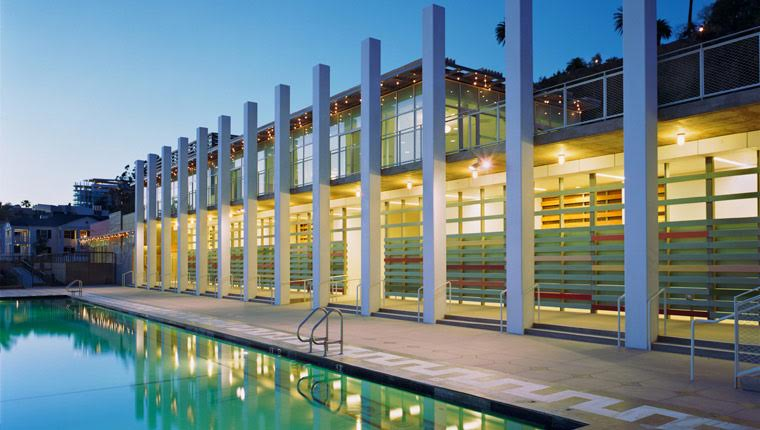
Annenberg Beach House

An urban runoff facility (SMURFF), the first of its kind in the US, catches and treats 3.5 million US gallons (13,000 m^{3}) of water each week that would otherwise flow into the bay via storm-drains and sells it back to end-users within the city for reuse as gray-water, while bioswales throughout the city allow rainwater to percolate into and replenish the groundwater. The groundwater supply plays an important role in the city's Sustainable Water Master Plan, whereby Santa Monica has set a goal of attaining 100% water independence by 2020. The city has numerous programs designed to promote water conservation among residents, including a rebate for those who convert lawns to drought-tolerant gardens that require less water.

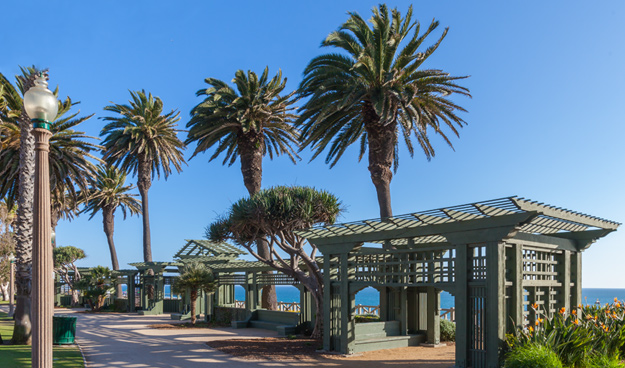
Palisades Park, founded in by Arcadia Bandini de Baker in 1892

Santa Monica has also instituted a green building-code whereby merely constructing to code automatically renders a building equivalent to the US Green Building Council's LEED Silver standards. The city's Main Library is one of many LEED certified or LEED equivalent buildings in the city. It is built over a 200,000-gallon cistern that collects filtered stormwater from the roof. The water is used for landscape irrigation.

Since 2009, Santa Monica has been developing the Zero Waste Strategic Operations Plan by which the city will set a goal of diverting at least 95% of all waste away from landfills, and toward recycling and composting, by 2030. The plan includes a food waste composting program, which diverts 3 million pounds of restaurant food waste away from landfills annually. As of 2013, 77% of all solid waste produced citywide is diverted from landfills.

Environmentally focused initiatives include curbside recycling, curbside composting bins (in addition to trash, yard-waste, and recycling bins), farmers' markets, community gardens, garden-share, an urban forest initiative, a hazardous materials home-collection service, and a green business certification.

As in other coastal beach communities, coastal erosion due to coastal infrastructure and high human usage is an increasing challenge, and will become worse due to sea level rise. Starting in 2016, local environmental groups began dune and beach restoration projects.

== Demographics ==
Historical population
Census	Pop.	Note	%±
1880	417		—
1890	1,580		278.9%
1900	3,057		93.5%
1910	7,847		156.7%
1920	15,252		94.4%
1930	37,146		143.5%
1940	53,500		44.0%
1950	71,595		33.8%
1960	83,249		16.3%
1970	88,289		6.1%
1980	88,314		0.0%
1990	86,905		−1.6%
2000	84,084		−3.2%
2010	89,736		6.7%
2020	93,076		3.7%
U.S. Decennial Census

=== Racial and ethnic composition ===
Santa Monica city, California – Racial and ethnic composition Note: the US Census treats Hispanic/Latino as an ethnic category. This table excludes Latinos from the racial categories and assigns them to a separate category. Hispanics/Latinos may be of any race.
Race / Ethnicity (NH = Non-Hispanic)	Pop 1980	Pop 1990	Pop 2000	Pop 2010	Pop 2020	% 1980	% 1990	% 2000	% 2010	% 2020
White alone (NH)	69,160	65,184	60,482	62,917	60,654	78.31%	75.01%	71.93%	70.11%	65.17%
Black or African American alone (NH)	3,476	3,732	3,081	3,364	3,623	3.94%	4.29%	3.66%	3.75%	3.89%
Native American or Alaska Native alone (NH)	405	270	199	173	129	0.46%	0.31%	0.24%	0.19%	0.14%
Asian alone (NH)	3,617	5,385	6,043	7,960	8,466	4.10%	6.20%	7.19%	8.87%	9.10%
Native Hawaiian or Pacific Islander alone (NH)	3,617	5,385	84	116	109	4.10%	6.20%	0.10%	0.13%	0.12%
Other race alone (NH)	188	124	307	316	805	0.21%	0.14%	0.37%	0.35%	0.86%
Mixed race or Multiracial (NH)	x	x	2,584	3,174	5,746	x	x	3.07%	3.54%	6.17%
Hispanic or Latino (any race)	11,468	12,210	11,304	11,716	13,544	12.99%	14.05%	13.44%	13.06%	14.55%
Total	88,314	86,905	84,084	89,736	93,076	100.00%	100.00%	100.00%	100.00%	100.00%

=== 2020 census ===
As of the 2020 census, Santa Monica had a population of 93,076. This corresponds to a population density of 11,067.3 people per square mile. The median age was 41.5 years. 13.6% of residents were under the age of 18 and 19.5% were 65 years of age or older. For every 100 females there were 93.4 males, and for every 100 females age 18 and over there were 91.8 males age 18 and over.

100.0% of residents lived in urban areas, while 0.0% lived in rural areas.

There were 47,438 households in Santa Monica, of which 16.7% had children under the age of 18 living in them. Of all households, 30.2% were married-couple households, 26.9% were households with a male householder and no spouse or partner present, and 35.5% were households with a female householder and no spouse or partner present. About 46.2% of all households were made up of individuals, and 14.9% had someone living alone who was 65 years of age or older.

There were 52,389 housing units, of which 47,438 (90.5%) were occupied and 4,951 (9.5%) were vacant. Of the occupied units, 12,856 (27.1%) were owner-occupied and 34,582 (72.9%) were renter-occupied. The homeowner vacancy rate was 1.4% and the rental vacancy rate was 6.8%. Of the vacant units, 2,540 (4.8% of total) were for rent, 230 (0.4%) were rented but not occupied, 183 (0.3%) were for sale only, 205 (0.4%) were sold but not occupied, 693 (1.3%) were for seasonal, recreational, or occasional use, and 1,100 (2.1%) were otherwise vacant.

The racial makeup of Santa Monica was 63,383 (68.1%) White, 8,602 (9.2%) Asian, 3,776 (4.1%) Black or African American, 539 (0.6%) American Indian and Alaska Native, 123 (0.1%) Native Hawaiian and Other Pacific Islander, 5,347 (5.7%) some other race, and 11,306 (12.1%) people were of two or more races. 13,544 people (14.6%) were Hispanic or Latino of any race.

Including all responses for people of two or more races, 73,996 (79.5%) were White alone or in combination with one or more other races, 11,864 (12.7%) were Asian alone or in combination with one or more other races, 5,459 (5.9%) were Black or African American alone or in combination, 1,877 (2.0%) were American Indian and Alaska Native alone or in combination, 415 (0.4%) were Native Hawaiian and other Pacific Islander alone or in combination, and 11,619 (12.5%) were some other race alone or in combination with one or more other races. Of the Hispanic or Latino population, 2,729 (2.9% of the total population) were White alone, 153 (0.2%) were Black or African American alone, 410 (0.4%) were American Indian and Alaska Native alone, 136 (0.1%) were Asian alone, 14 (0.0%) were Native Hawaiian and Other Pacific Islander alone, 4,542 (4.9%) were some other race alone, and 5,560 (6.0%) were two or more races.

=== 2017-2021 estimates ===
The median household income between 2017 and 2021 was $99,847 (2021 dollars), with 10.6% of people living in poverty. 94.8% of households had a computer between 2017 and 2021, and 91.0% had broadband internet access.

=== 2010 census ===
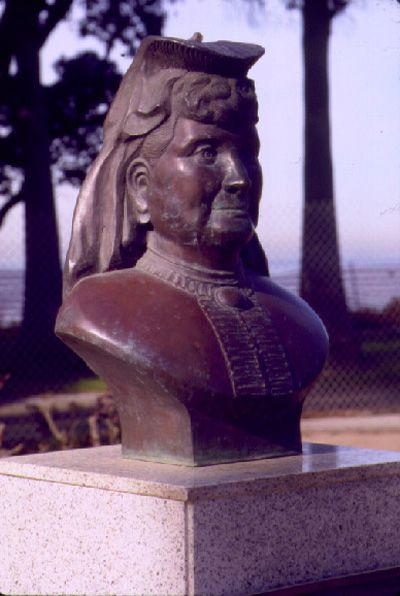
The Bust of Arcadia Bandini de Baker in Palisades Park honors city founder Arcadia Bandini de Stearns Baker.

The 2010 United States census reported Santa Monica had a population of 89,736. The population density was 10,662.6 inhabitants per square mile (4,116.9/km^{2}). The racial makeup of Santa Monica was 69,663 (77.6%) White (70.1% Non-Hispanic White), 3,526 (3.9%) African American, 338 (0.4%) Native American, 8,053 (9.0%) Asian, 124 (0.1%) Pacific Islander, 4,047 (4.5%) from other races, and 3,985 (4.4%) from two or more races. Hispanic or Latino of any race were 11,716 persons (13.1%), with Mexican Americans, Spanish Americans, and Argentine Americans making up 64.2%, 6.4%, and 4.7% of the Hispanic population respectively. Armenian Americans, classified under White (Non-Hispanic White), make up 0.7% of the total Santa Monica population.

The Census reported 87,610 people (97.6% of the population) lived in households, 1,299 (1.4%) lived in non-institutionalized group quarters, and 827 (0.9%) were institutionalized.

There were 46,917 households, out of which 7,835 (16.7%) had children under the age of 18 living in them, 13,092 (27.9%) were opposite-sex married couples living together, 3,510 (7.5%) had a female householder with no husband present, 1,327 (2.8%) had a male householder with no wife present. There were 2,867 (6.1%) unmarried opposite-sex partnerships, and 416 (0.9%) same-sex married couples or partnerships. 22,716 households (48.4%) were made up of individuals, and 5,551 (11.8%) had someone living alone who was 65 years of age or older. The average household size was 1.87. There were 17,929 families (38.2% of all households); the average family size was 2.79.

The population was spread out, with 12,580 people (14.0%) under the age of 18, 6,442 people (7.2%) aged 18 to 24, 32,552 people (36.3%) aged 25 to 44, 24,746 people (27.6%) aged 45 to 64, and 13,416 people (15.0%) who were 65 years of age or older. The median age was 40.4 years. For every 100 females, there were 93.2 males. For every 100 females age 18 and over, there were 91.2 males.

There were 50,912 housing units at an average density of 6,049.5 units per square mile (2,335.7 units/km^{2}), of which 13,315 (28.4%) were owner-occupied, and 33,602 (71.6%) were occupied by renters. The homeowner vacancy rate was 1.1%; the rental vacancy rate was 5.1%. 30,067 people (33.5% of the population) lived in owner-occupied housing units, and 57,543 people (64.1%) lived in rental housing units.

According to the 2010 United States Census, Santa Monica had a median household income of $73,649, with 11.2% of the population living below the federal poverty line.

=== 2000 census ===
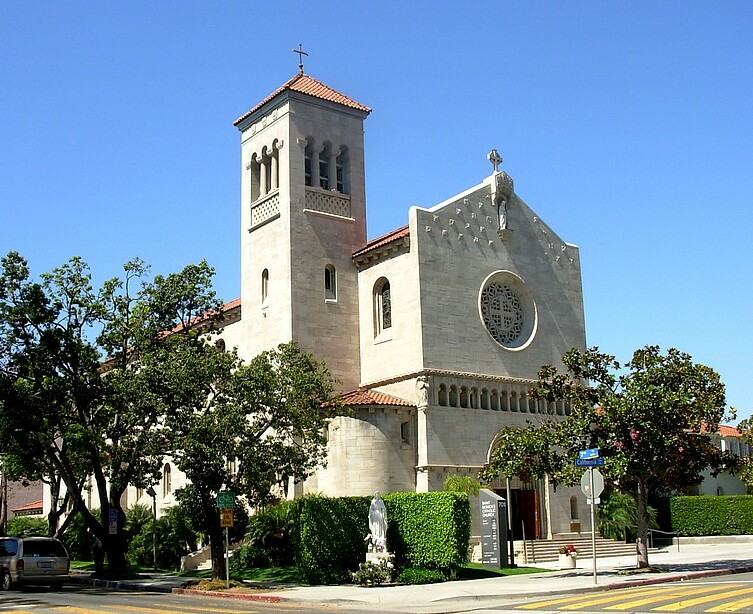
St. Monica Catholic Church

As of the census of 2000, there were 84,084 people, 44,497 households, and 16,775 families in the city. The population density was 10,178.7 inhabitants per square mile (3,930.0 inhabitants/km^{2}). There were 47,863 housing units at an average density of 5,794.0 units per square mile (2,237.1 units/km^{2}). The racial makeup of the city was 78.29% White, 7.25% Asian, 3.78% African American, 0.47% Native American, 0.10% Pacific Islander, 5.97% from other races, and 4.13% from two or more races. 13.44% of the population were Hispanic or Latino of any race. There were 44,497 households, out of which 15.8% had children under the age of 18, 27.5% were married couples living together, 7.5% had a female householder with no husband present, and 62.3% were non-families. 51.2% of all households were made up of individuals, and 10.6% had someone living alone who was 65 years of age or older. The average household size was 1.83, and the average family size was 2.80.

The city of Santa Monica is consistently among the most educated cities in the United States, with 23.8 percent of all residents holding graduate degrees.

The population was diverse in age, with 14.6% under 18, 6.1% from 18 to 24, 40.1% from 25 to 44, 24.8% from 45 to 64, and 14.4% 65 years or older. The median age was 39 years. For every 100 females, there were 93.0 males. For every 100 females age 18 and over, there were 91.3 males.

According to a 2009 estimate, the median income for a household in the city was $71,095, and the median income for a family was $109,410. Males had a median income of $55,689 versus $42,948 for females. The per capita income for the city was $42,874. 10.4% of the population and 5.4% of families were below the poverty line. Out of the total population, 9.9% of those under the age of 18 and 10.2% of those 65 and older were living below the poverty line.

=== Crime ===
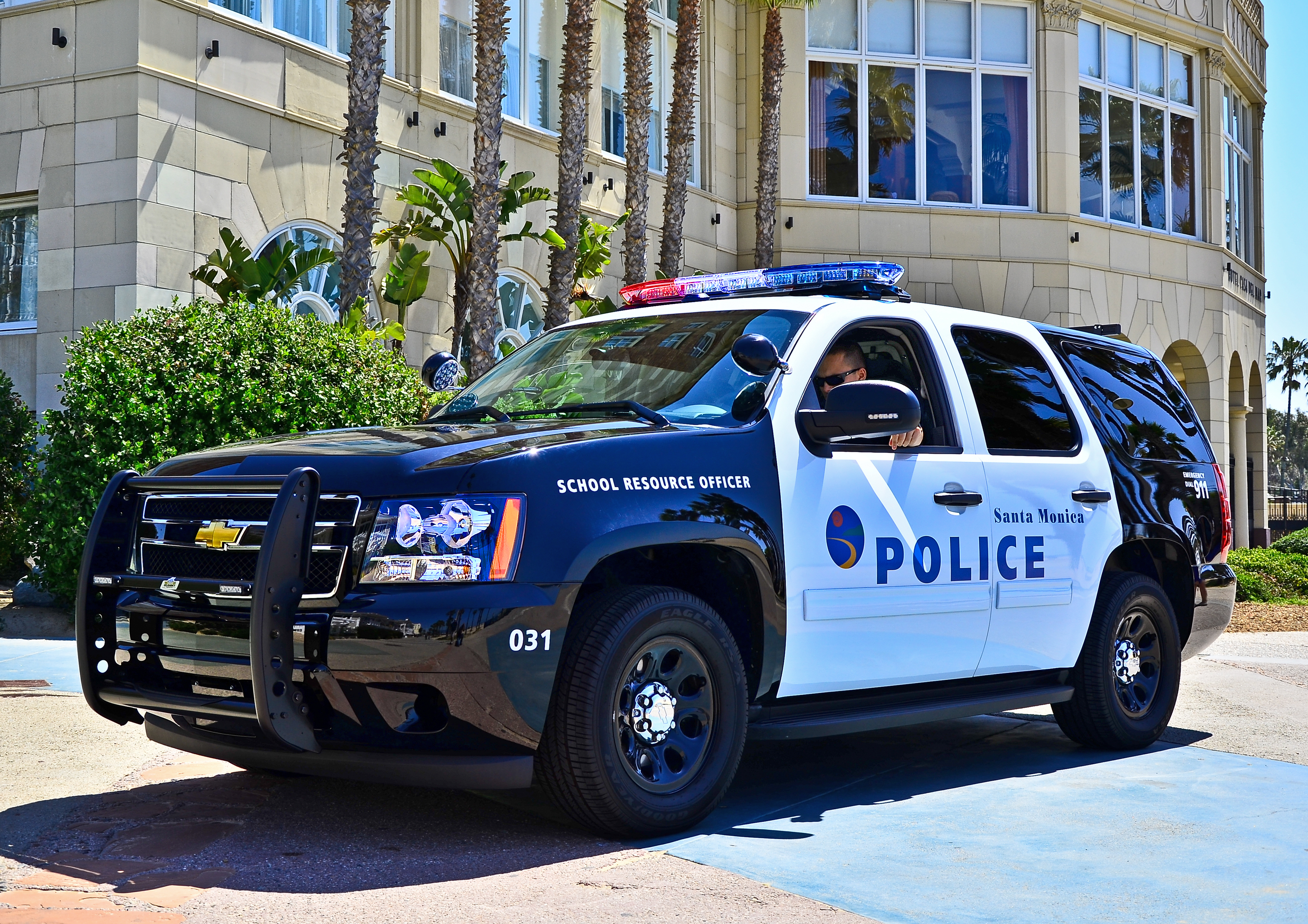
Santa Monica Police Dept patrol car

In 2006, crime in Santa Monica affected 4.41% of the population, slightly lower than the national average crime rate that year of 4.48%. The majority of this was property crime, which affected 3.74% of Santa Monica's population in 2006; this was higher than the rates for Los Angeles County (2.76%) and California (3.17%), but lower than the national average (3.91%). These per-capita crime rates are computed based on Santa Monica's full-time population of about 85,000. However, the Santa Monica Police Department has suggested the actual per-capita crime rate is much lower, as tourists, workers, and beachgoers can increase the city's daytime population to between 250,000 and 450,000 people.

Hate crime has typically been minimal in Santa Monica, with only one reported incident in 2007. The city experienced a spike in anti-Islamic hate crimes in 2001 after the September 11 attacks, but hate crime levels returned to their minimal 2000 levels by 2002.

==== Gang activity ====
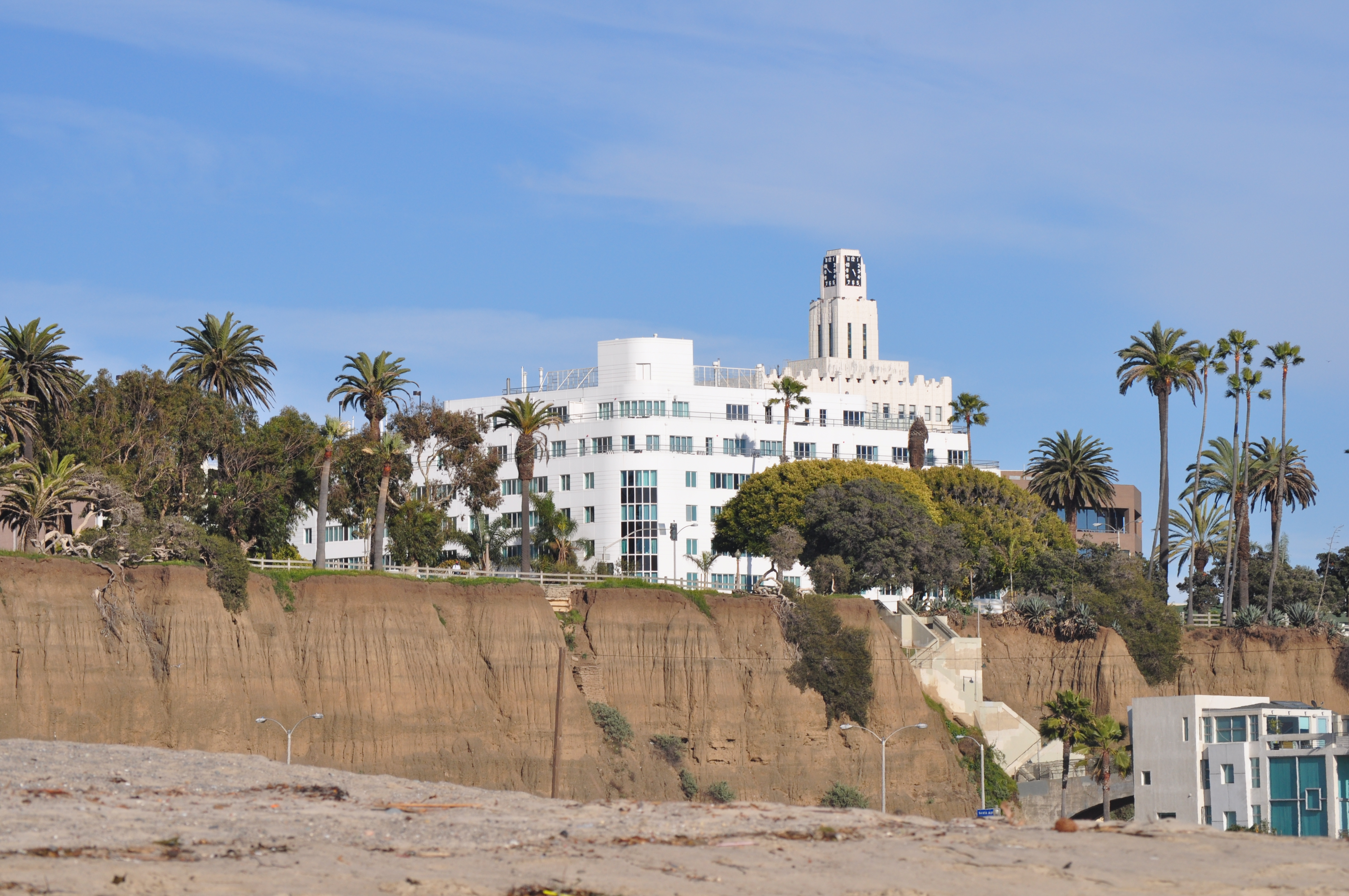
View of the Bay Cities Guarantee Building from the beach

The Pico neighborhood of Santa Monica (south of the Santa Monica Freeway) experiences some gang activity. The city estimates there are about 50 gang members based in Santa Monica, although some community organizers dispute this claim. Gang activity has been prevalent for decades in the Pico neighborhood.

In October 1998, alleged Culver City 13 gang member Omar Sevilla of Culver City was killed. A couple of hours after the shooting of Sevilla, German tourist Horst Fietze was killed. Several days later, Juan Martin Campos, a Santa Monica city employee, was shot and killed. Police believe this was a retaliatory killing in response to Sevilla's killing. Less than 24 hours later, Javier Cruz was wounded in a drive-by shooting outside his home on 17th and Michigan.

In 1998, there was a double homicide in the Westside Clothing store on Lincoln Boulevard. During the incident, Culver City gang members David "Puppet" Robles and Jesse "Psycho" Garcia entered the store masked and began opening fire, killing Anthony and Michael Juarez. Police say the incident was in retaliation for a shooting committed by the Santa Monica 13 gang days before the Juarez brothers were shot down.

=== Homeless population ===
In 2022, there were 826 homeless individuals in Santa Monica.

== Economy ==
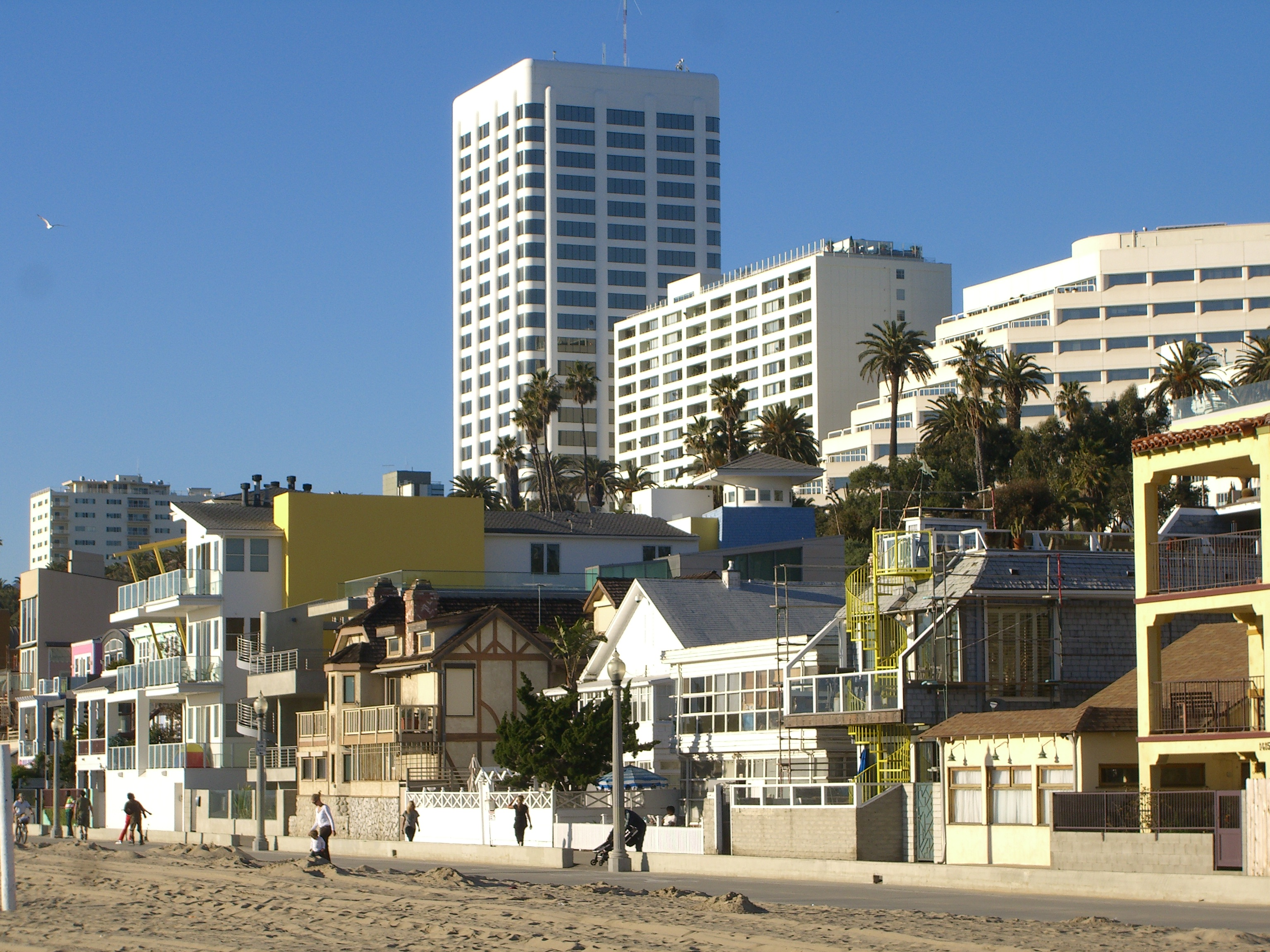
View from Santa Monica Beach

Santa Monica is home to the headquarters of many notable businesses, such as GoodRx, Hulu, Illumination, Starz Entertainment, Lionsgate Studios, Snap Inc., Macerich, CBS Media Ventures, Game Show Network, the RAND Corporation, The Recording Academy (which presents the annual Grammy Awards), and Universal Music Group. Atlantic Aviation is at the Santa Monica Airport. The National Public Radio member station KCRW is on the Santa Monica College campus.

Several videogame development studios are based in Santa Monica, making it a location for the industry. These include:

- Activision Blizzard (which includes Activision)
- Naughty Dog (Creators of Crash Bandicoot (1996–1999), Jak & Daxter, Uncharted and The Last of Us franchises)

In addition, Santa Monica is part of Silicon Beach, and the city serves as the home of dozens of venture capital-funded startup companies.

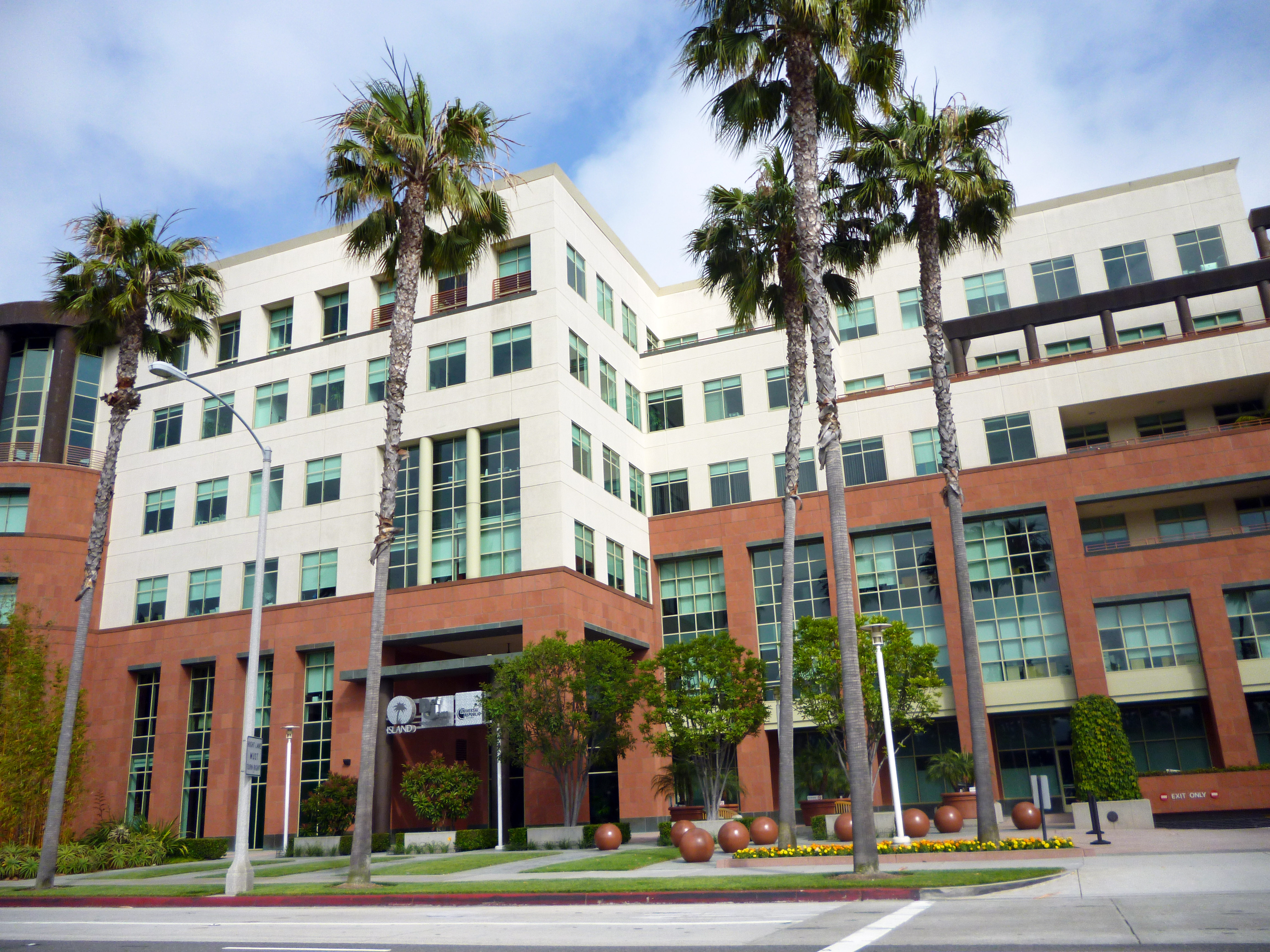
Universal Music Group operational headquarters

Former Santa Monica businesses include Douglas Aircraft (now merged with Boeing), GeoCities (which in December 1996 was headquartered on the third floor of 1918 Main Street in Santa Monica), Metro-Goldwyn-Mayer, and MySpace (now headquartered in Beverly Hills).

=== Top employers ===
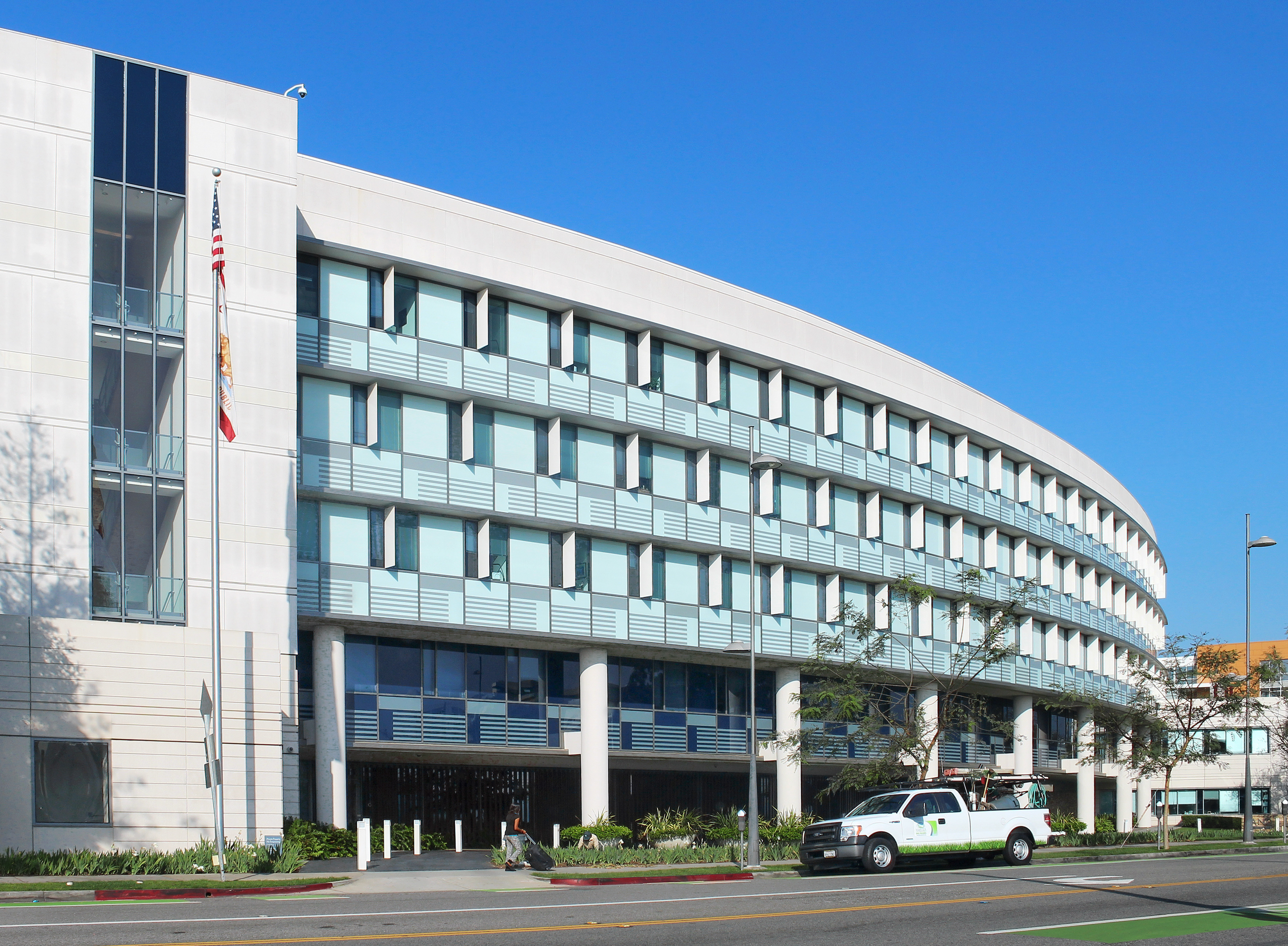
RAND Corporation headquarters

According to the city's 2022 Annual Comprehensive Financial Report, the top employers in the city were:

#	Employer	# of Employees
1	City of Santa Monica	2,059
2	Santa Monica – UCLA Medical Center	1,965
3	Santa Monica College	1,865
4	Snap Inc.	1,667
5	Universal Music Group	1,400
6	Saint John's Health Center	1,368
7	Santa Monica-Malibu Unified School District	1,358
8	Hulu	1,320
9	Oracle Corporation	950
10	Activision	919

== Arts and culture ==
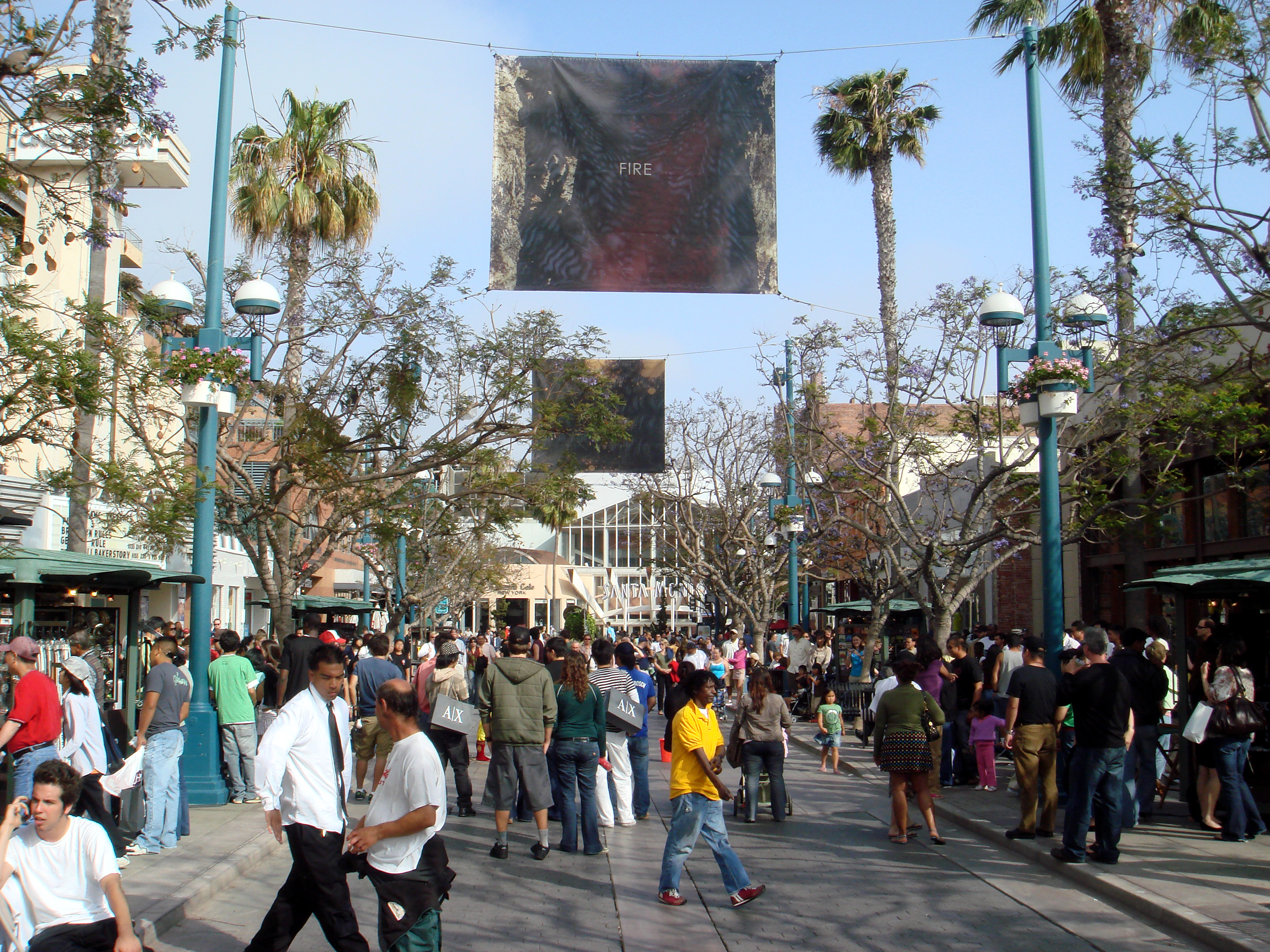
Third Street Promenade, leading to Frank Gehry's Santa Monica Place

The Santa Monica Looff Hippodrome (carousel) is a National Historic Landmark. It sits on the Santa Monica Pier, which was built in 1909. The La Monica Ballroom on the pier was once the largest ballroom in the US and the source for many New Year's Eve national network broadcasts.

The Santa Monica Civic Auditorium was an important music venue for several decades and hosted the Academy Awards in the 1960s. McCabe's Guitar Shop is a leading acoustic performance space as well as a retail outlet. The Santa Monica Playhouse is a popular theater in the city.

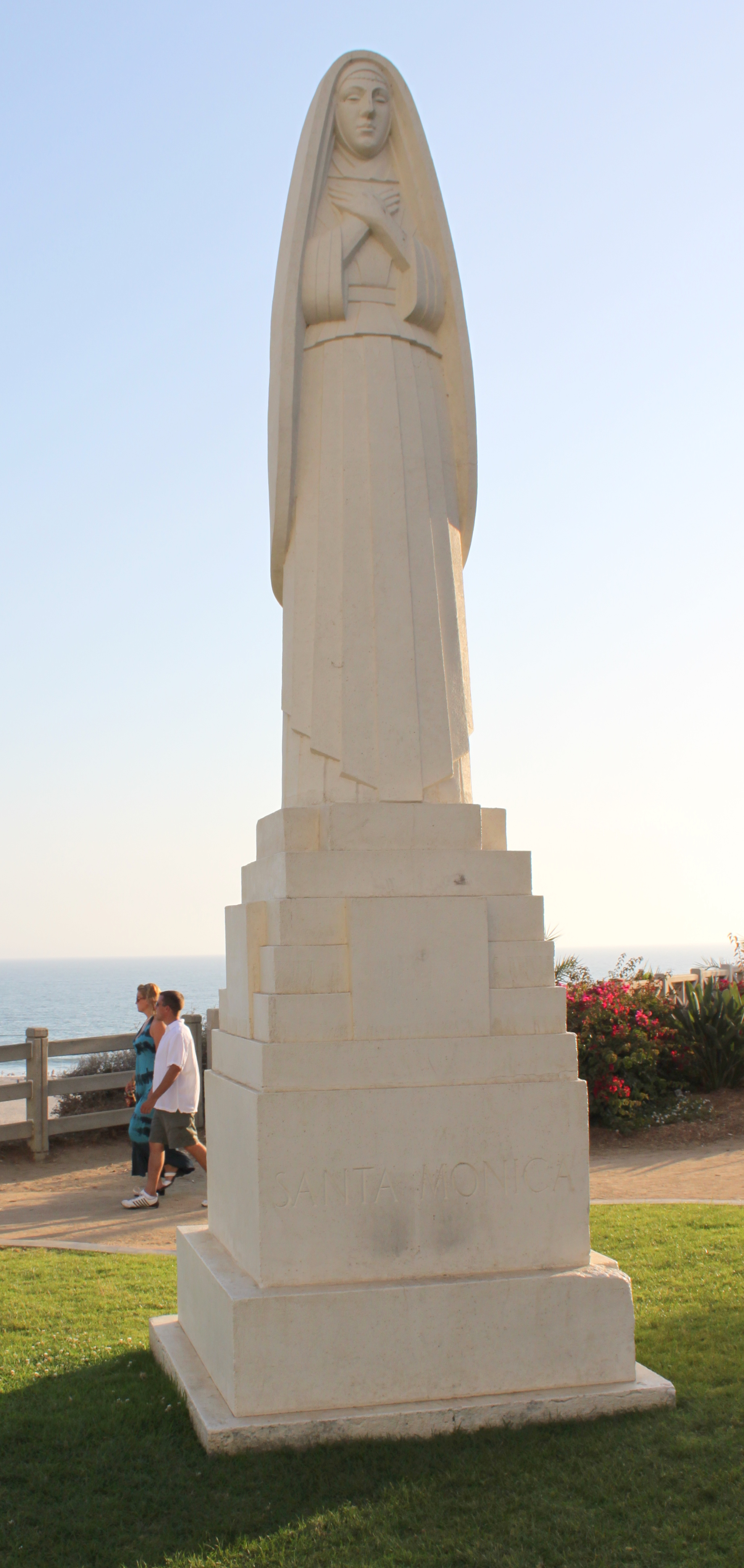
Santa Monica, a 1935 sculpture by Eugene Morahan in Palisades Park

Bergamot Station is a city-owned art gallery compound. The city is also home to the California Heritage Museum and the Angels Attic dollhouse and toy museum.

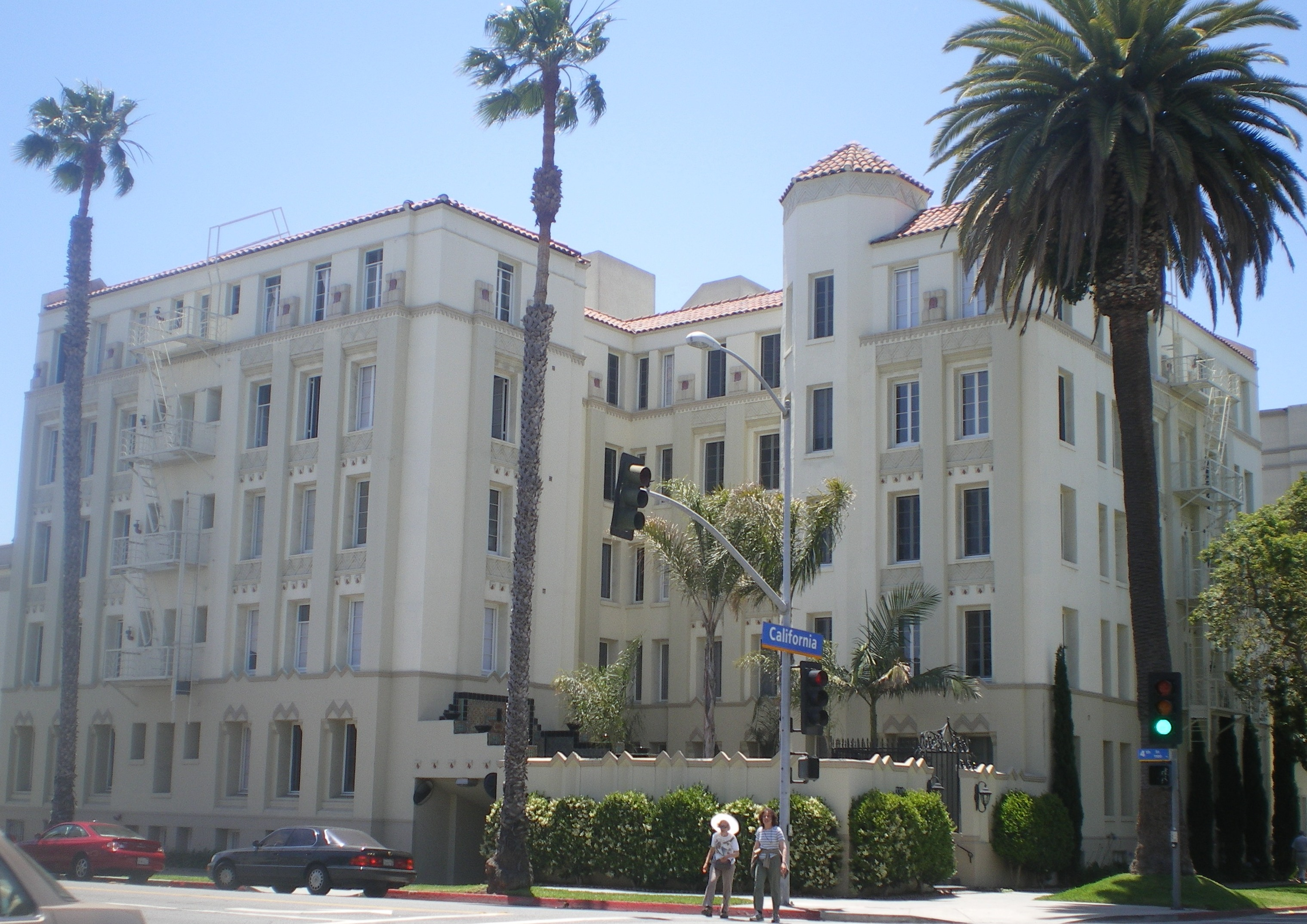
The historic Mission Revival/Art Deco fusion Charmont Apartments

The New West Symphony is the resident orchestra of Barnum Hall. They are also the resident orchestra of the Oxnard Performing Arts Center and the Thousand Oaks Civic Arts Plaza.

Santa Monica hosts the annual Santa Monica Film Festival.

The city's oldest movie theater is the Majestic. Opened in 1912 and also known as the Mayfair Theatre, it has been closed since the 1994 Northridge earthquake. The Aero Theater (now operated by the American Cinematheque) and Criterion Theater were built in the 1930s and still show movies.

=== Shopping districts ===
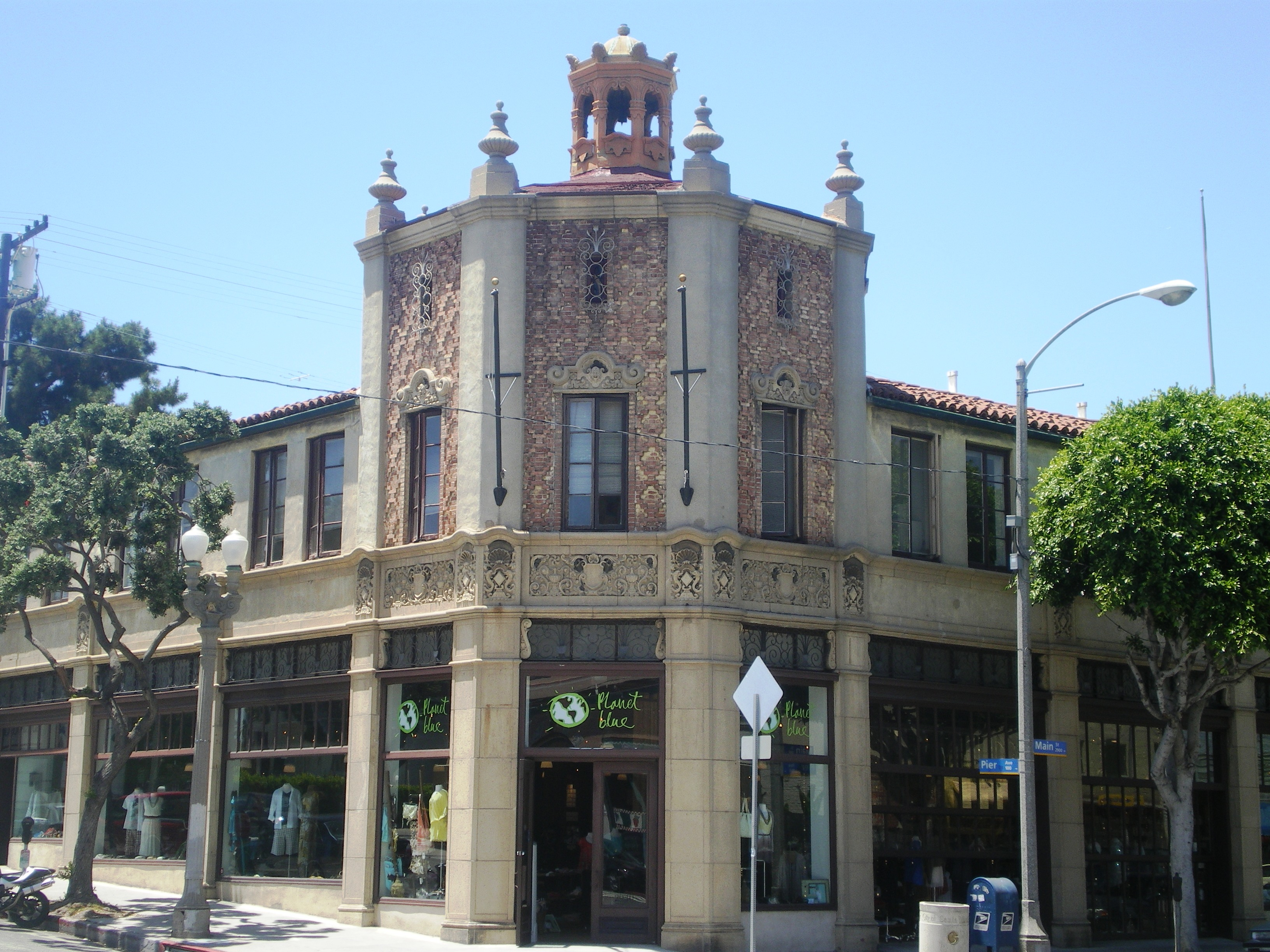
The Parkhurst Building, built in 1927 in a Spanish Colonial Revival style

Santa Monica has three main shopping districts: Montana Avenue on the north side, the Downtown District in the city's core, and Main Street on the south end. Each has its own unique feel and personality. Montana Avenue is a stretch of luxury boutique stores, restaurants, and small offices that generally features more upscale shopping. The Main Street district offers an eclectic mix of clothing, restaurants, and other specialty retail.

The Downtown District is the home of the Third Street Promenade, a major outdoor pedestrian-only shopping district that stretches for three blocks between Wilshire Blvd. and Broadway. Third Street is closed to vehicles for those three blocks to allow people to stroll, congregate, shop, and enjoy street performers.

The Santa Monica Place, featuring Bloomingdale's and Nordstrom in a three-level outdoor environment, is at the Promenade's southern end. After a period of redevelopment, the mall reopened in the fall of 2010 as a modern shopping, entertainment, and dining complex with more outdoor space.

=== Public library system ===
The Santa Monica Public Library consists of a Main Library in the downtown area, plus four neighborhood branches: Fairview, Montana Avenue, Ocean Park, and Pico Boulevard.

== Sports ==
The Santa Monica Track Club has many prominent track athletes, including many Olympic gold medalists. Santa Monica is the home to Southern California Aquatics, which was founded by Olympic swimmer Clay Evans and Bonnie Adair. Santa Monica is also home to the Santa Monica Rugby Club, a semi-professional team that competes in the Pacific Rugby Premiership, the highest-level rugby union club competition in the United States.

=== 1984 Summer Olympics ===
The men's and women's marathon ran through parts of Santa Monica during the 1984 Summer Olympics.

== Parks and recreation ==
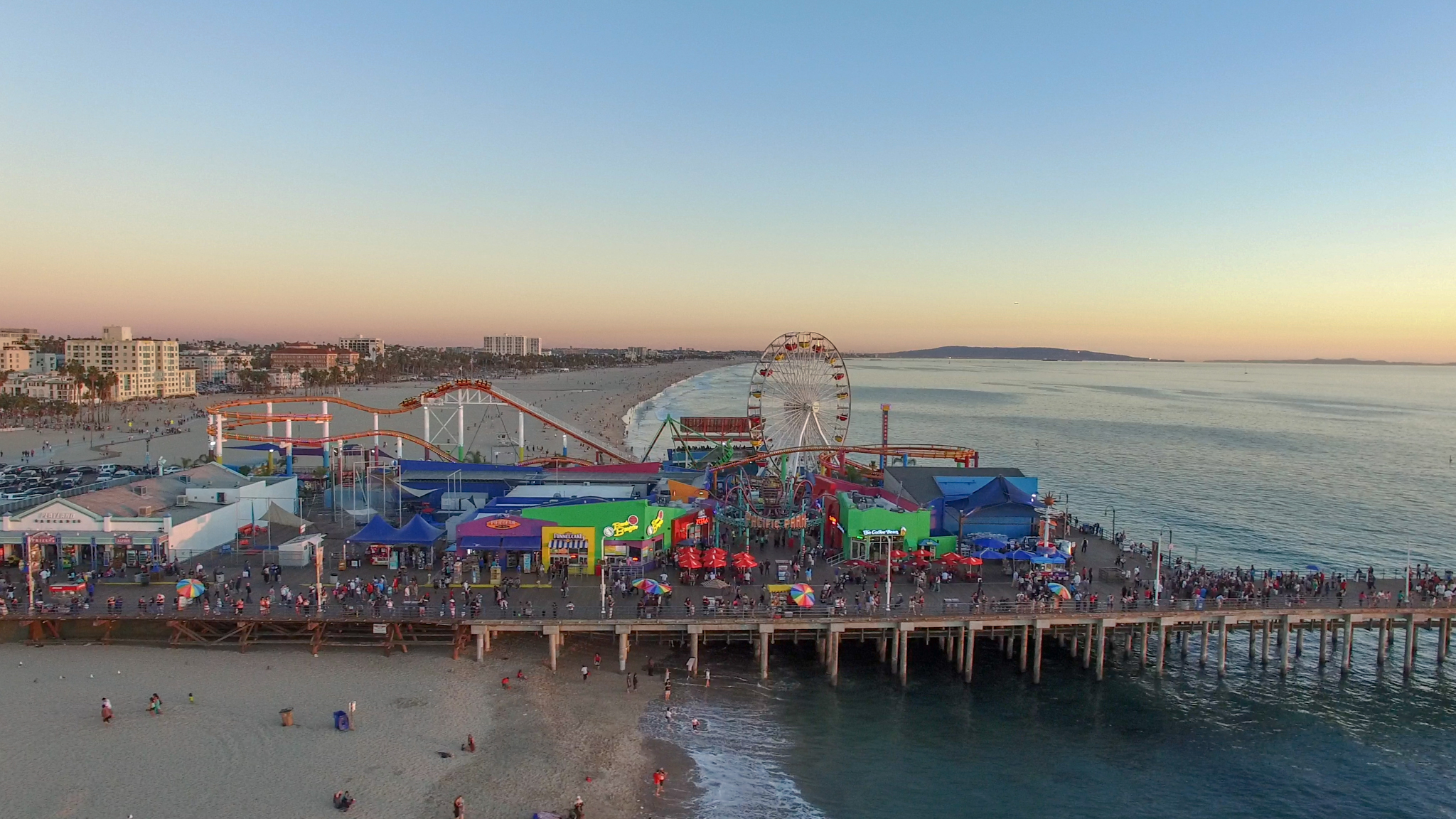
View of Santa Monica Pier

Palisades Park stretches out along the crumbling bluffs overlooking the Pacific and is a popular walking area to view the ocean.

Tongva Park occupies 6 acres (24,000 m^{2}) between Ocean Avenue and Main Street, just south of Colorado Avenue.

The Santa Monica Stairs, a long, steep staircase consisting of 152 wooden steps and 18 concrete steps in a straight path, that leads from north of San Vicente down into Santa Monica Canyon, is a popular spot for outdoor workouts. Some area residents have complained that the stairs have become too popular, attracting too many exercisers to the neighborhood.

Ishihara Park opened to the public in 2017 and acts as a buffer between the Los Angeles Metro Rail and the surrounding residential community.

== Government ==
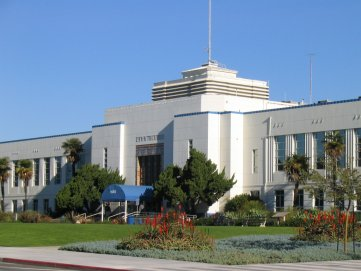
Santa Monica City Hall, designed by Donald Parkinson, with terrazo mosaics by Stanton Macdonald-Wright

=== Local government ===
Santa Monica is governed by the Santa Monica City Council, a Council-Manager governing body with seven members elected at-large. The mayor is Caroline Torosis, and the Mayor Pro Tempore is Jesse Zwick. The other five council members are Dan Hall, Ellis Raskin, Barry Snell, Natalya Zernitskaya, and Lana Negrete.

=== Representation ===
In the California State Legislature, Santa Monica is in the 24th senatorial district, represented by Democrat Ben Allen, and in the 51st Assembly district, represented by Democrat Rick Zbur.

In the United States House of Representatives, Santa Monica is in California's 36th congressional district, represented by Democrat Ted Lieu.

== Education ==
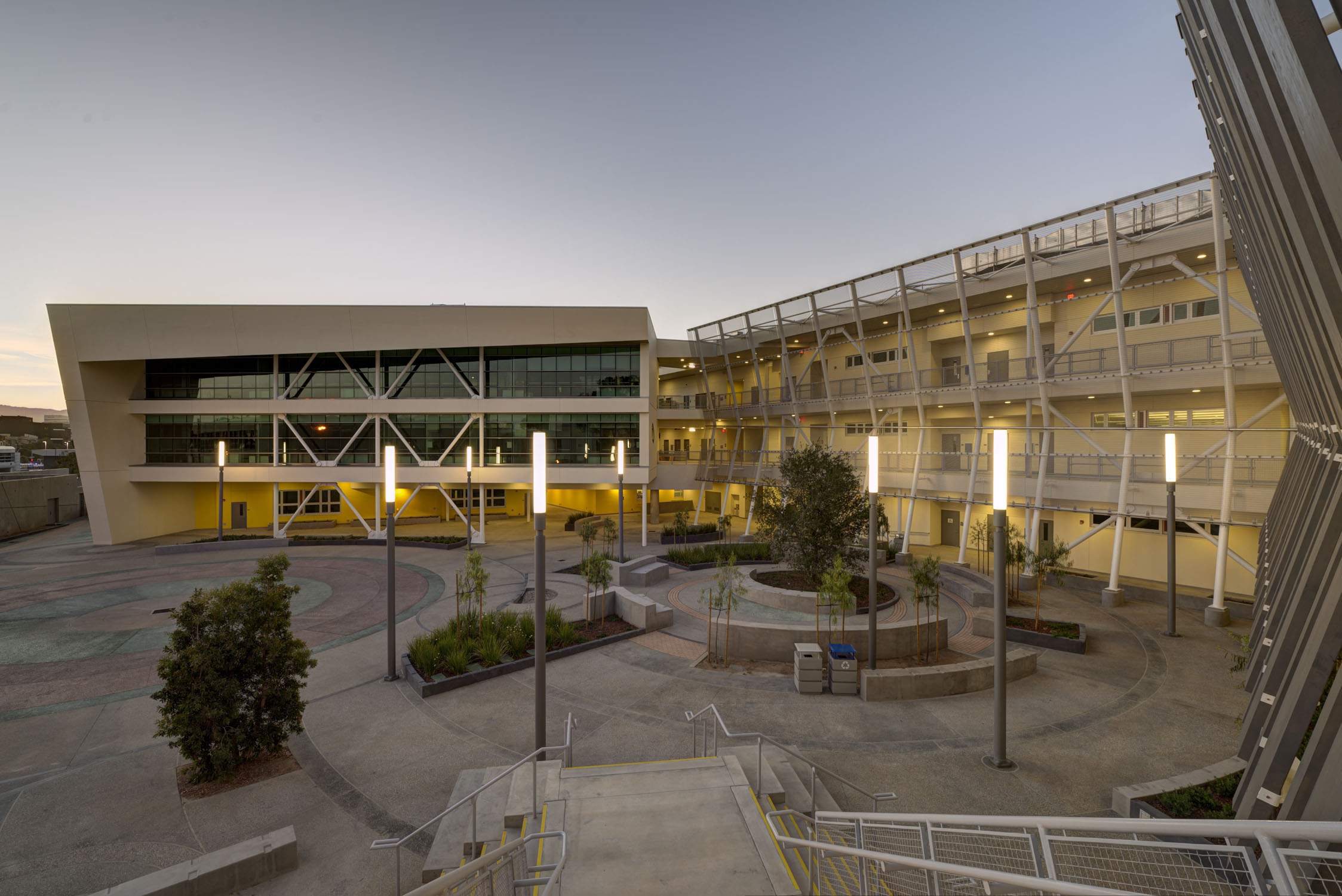
Santa Monica High School

=== Public schools ===
The Santa Monica–Malibu Unified School District provides public education at the elementary and secondary levels. In addition to the traditional model of early education school houses, SMASH (Santa Monica Alternative School House) is "a K–8 public school of choice with team teachers and multi-aged classrooms". The district maintains eight elementary schools, three middle schools, and three high schools in Santa Monica.

==== Private schools ====
Private schools in the city include Crossroads School and Saint Monica Catholic High School.

Asahi Gakuen, a weekend Japanese supplementary school system, operates its Santa Monica campus (サンタモニカ校･高等部 Santamonika-kō kōtōbu) at Webster Middle in the Sawtelle neighborhood of Los Angeles. All high school classes in the Asahi Gakuen system are held at the Santa Monica campus.

=== Post-secondary ===
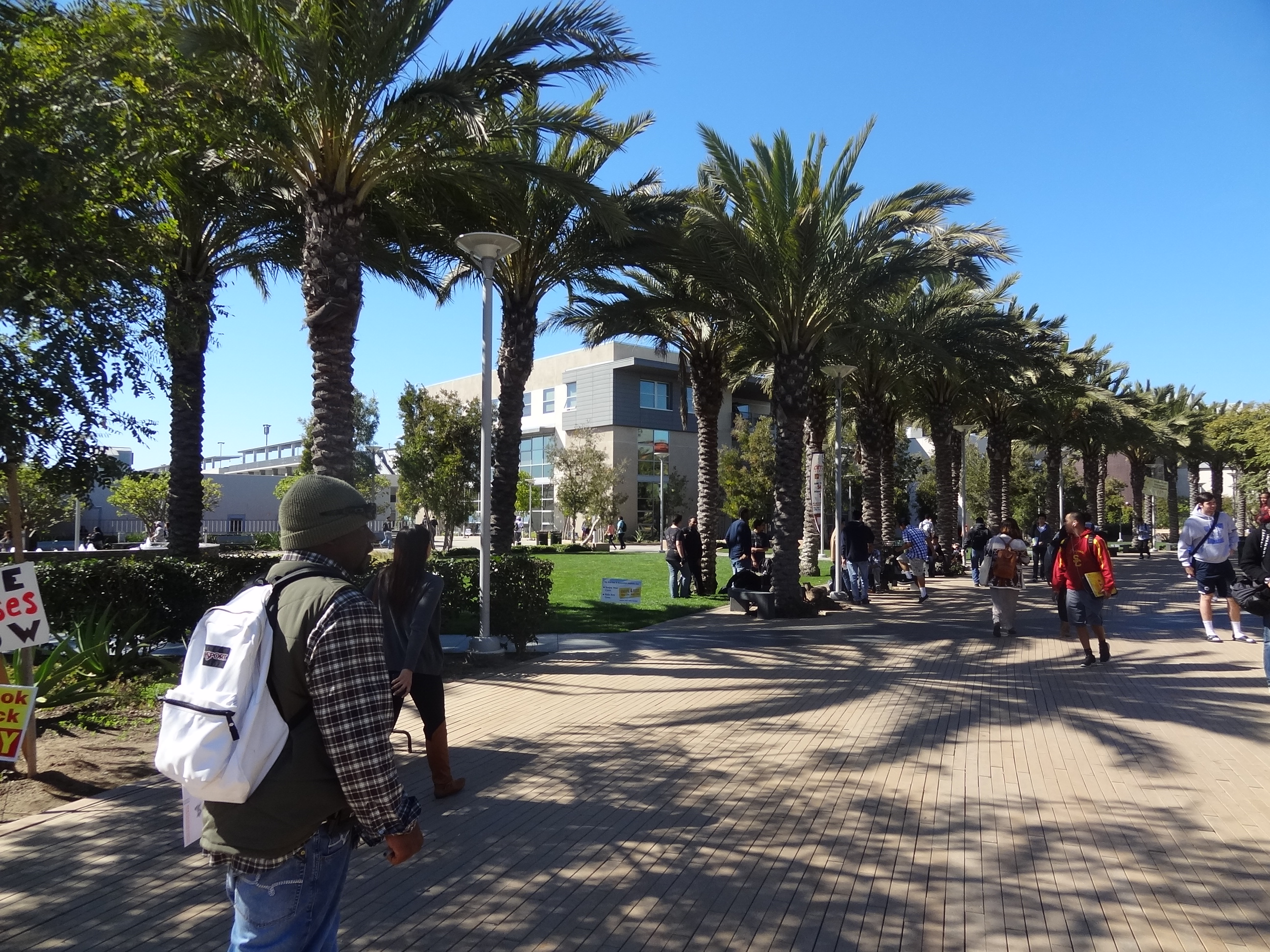
Santa Monica College

Santa Monica College is a community college founded in 1929. Many SMC graduates transfer to the University of California system. It occupies 35 acres (14 hectares) and enrolls 30,000 students annually. The Frederick S. Pardee RAND Graduate School, associated with the RAND Corporation, is the U.S.'s largest producer of public policy PhDs.

Universities and colleges within a 22-mile (35 km) radius from Santa Monica include Santa Monica College, Antioch University Los Angeles, Loyola Marymount University, Mount St. Mary's University, Pepperdine University, California State University, Northridge, California State University, Los Angeles, UCLA, USC, West Los Angeles College, California Institute of Technology (Caltech), Occidental College (Oxy), Los Angeles City College, Los Angeles Southwest College, Los Angeles Valley College, and Emperor's College of Traditional Oriental Medicine.

== Infrastructure ==
=== Transportation ===
==== Bicycles ====
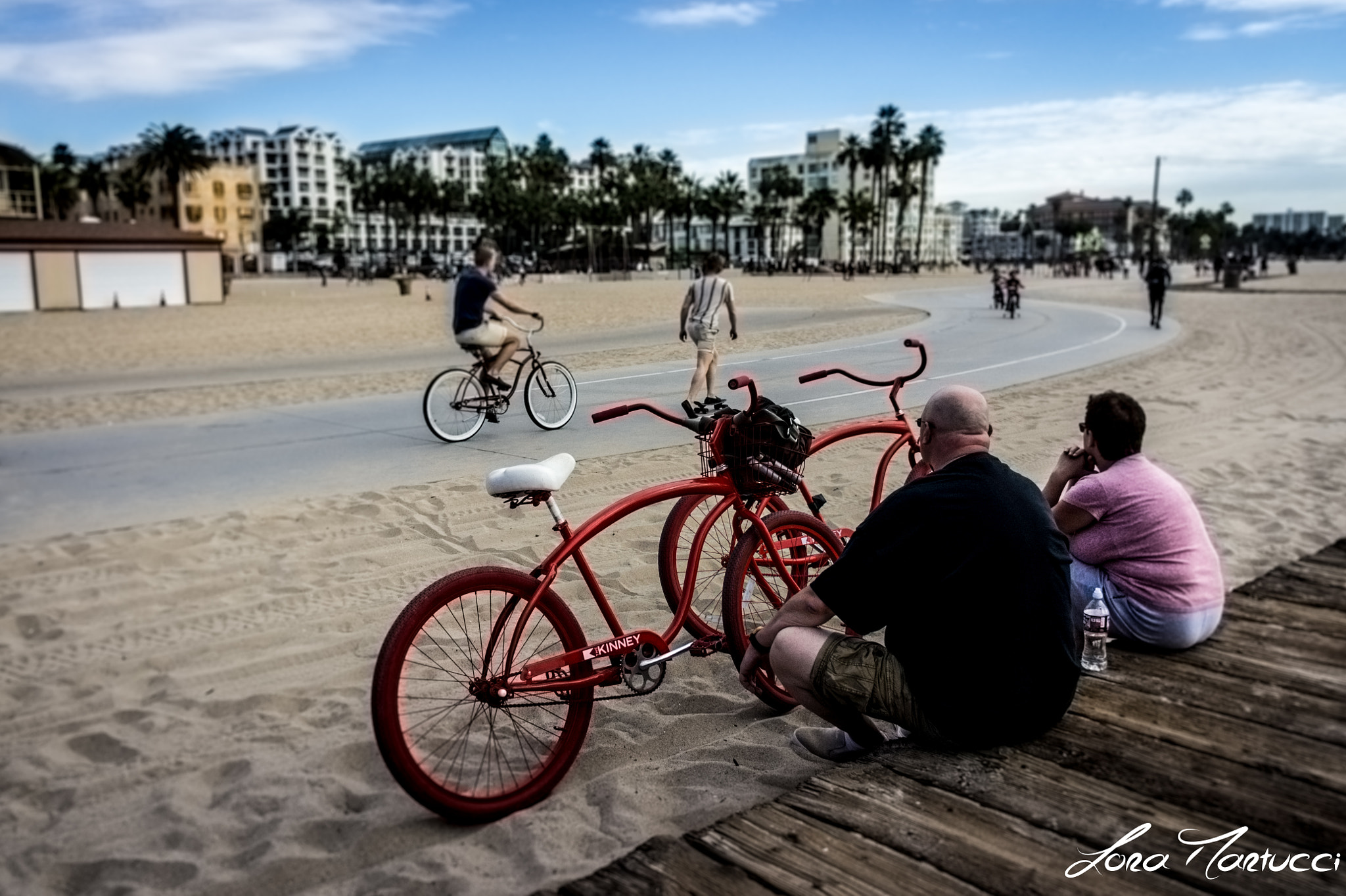
Cyclists on the Coastal Bike Trail

Santa Monica has a bike action plan and launched a bicycle sharing system in November 2015. The city is traversed by the Marvin Braude Bike Trail. Santa Monica has received the Bicycle Friendly Community Award (Bronze in 2009, Silver in 2013) by the League of American Bicyclists. Local bicycle advocacy organizations include Santa Monica Spoke, a local chapter of the Los Angeles County Bicycle Coalition. Santa Monica is thought to be one of the leaders for bicycle infrastructure and programming in Los Angeles County although cycling infrastructure in Los Angeles County in general remains very poor compared to other major cities.

The city implemented a 5-year and 20-year Bike Action Plan to attain 14 to 35% bicycle transportation mode share by 2030 through the installation of enhanced bicycle infrastructure throughout the city. In 2023, Santa Monica scored near the 90th percentile of cities surveyed in the PeopleForBikes City Ratings, which measures the quality of a city's bike network.

In terms of the number of bicycle accidents, Santa Monica ranks as one of the worst (#2) out of 102 California cities with a population of 50,000–100,000, a ranking consistent with the city's composite ranking. In 2007 and 2008, local police cracked down on Santa Monica Critical Mass rides that had become controversial, putting a damper on the tradition.

==== Highways ====
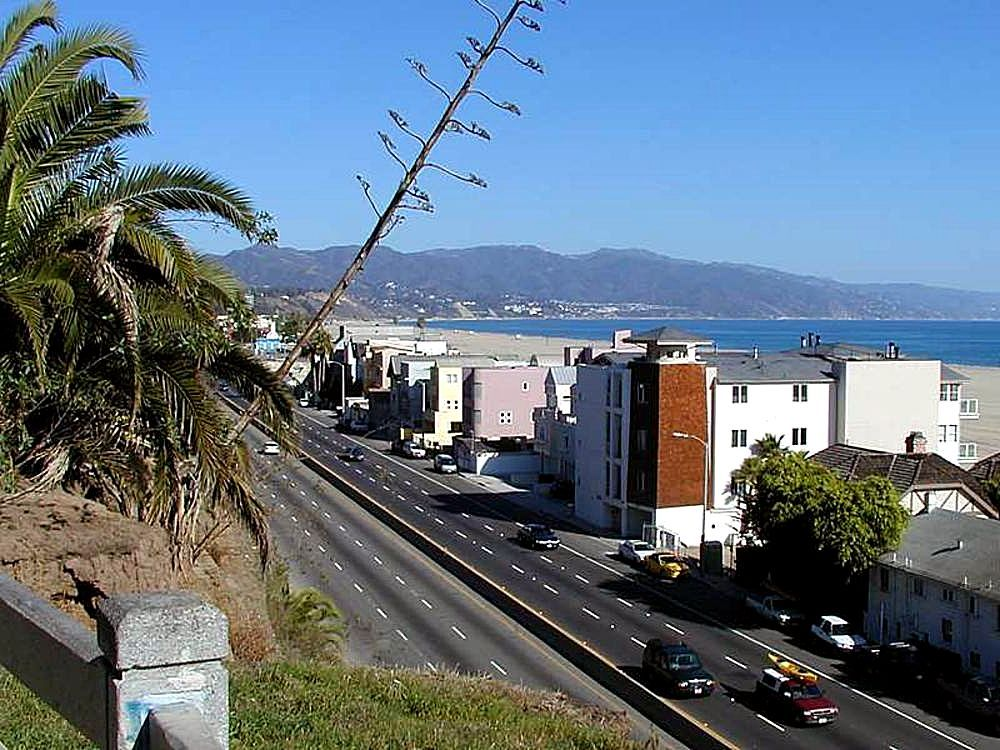
SR 1 running through Santa Monica

I-10 begins in Santa Monica near the Pacific Ocean and heads east. The Santa Monica Freeway between Santa Monica and downtown Los Angeles has the distinction of being one of the busiest highways in all of North America. After traversing the Greater Los Angeles area, I-10 crosses seven more states, terminating at Jacksonville, Florida. In Santa Monica, there is a road sign designating this route as the Christopher Columbus Transcontinental Highway. State Route 2 (SR 2) begins in Santa Monica, barely grazing SR 1 at Lincoln Boulevard, and continues northeast across Los Angeles County, through the Angeles National Forest, crossing the San Gabriel Mountains as the Angeles Crest Highway, ending in Wrightwood. Santa Monica is also the western terminus of Historic U.S. Route 66. Close to the eastern boundary of Santa Monica, Sepulveda Boulevard reaches from Long Beach at the south, to the northern end of the San Fernando Valley. Just east of Santa Monica is Interstate 405 (I-405), the San Diego Freeway, a major north–south route in Los Angeles and Orange counties.

==== Motorized vehicles ====
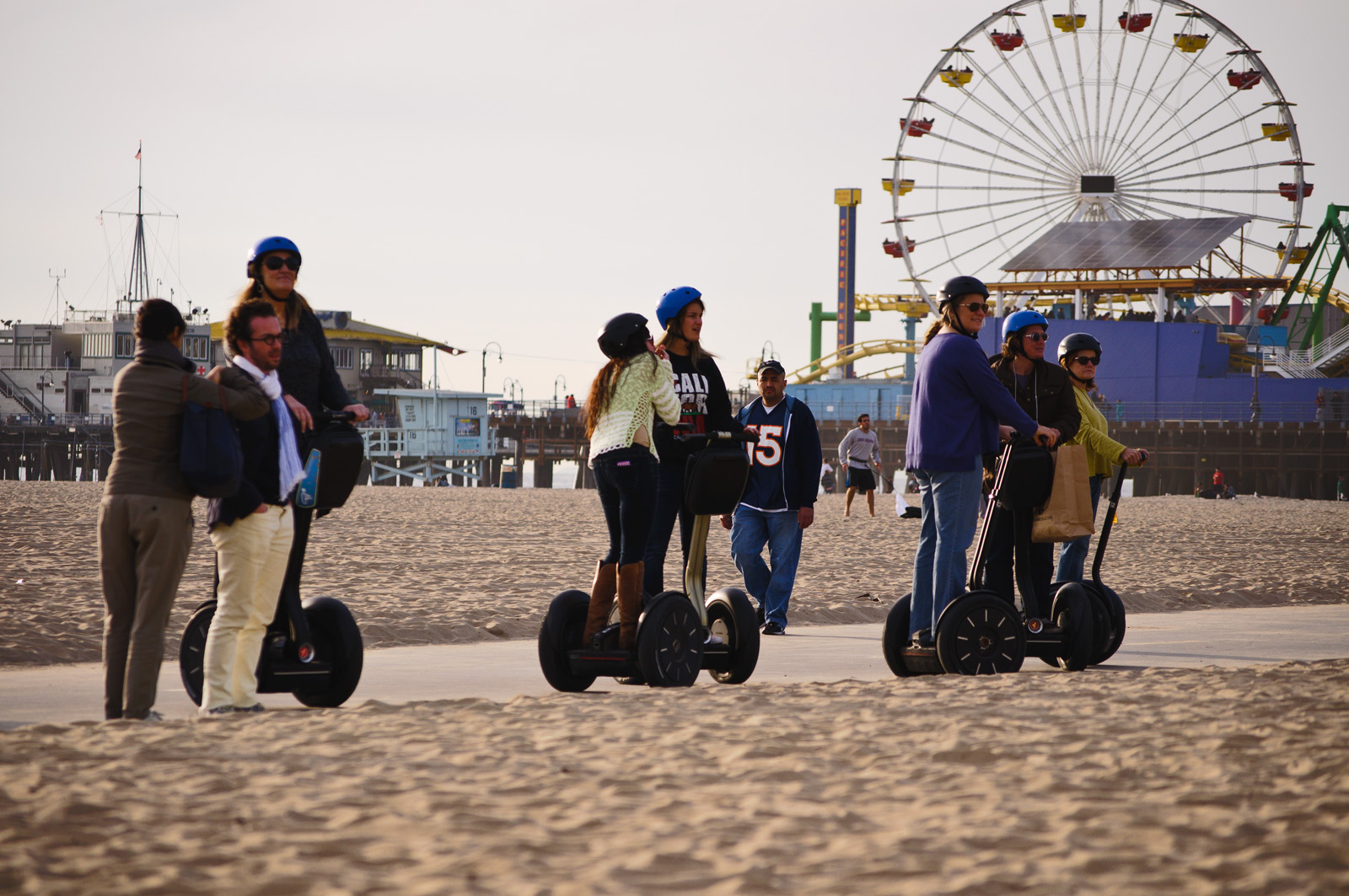
People on Segways on Santa Monica State Beach

Santa Monica has purchased the first ZeroTruck all-electric medium-duty truck. The vehicle will be equipped with a Scelzi utility body, which is based on the Isuzu N series chassis, a UQM PowerPhase 100 advanced electric motor, and is the only US-built electric truck offered for sale in the United States in 2009.

==== Bus ====
The city of Santa Monica runs its own bus service, the Big Blue Bus, which also serves much of West Los Angeles and the University of California, Los Angeles (UCLA). A Big Blue Bus was featured prominently in the action movie Speed.

The city of Santa Monica is also served by the Los Angeles County Metropolitan Transportation Authority's (Metro) bus lines. Metro also complements Big Blue service, as when Big Blue routes are not operational overnight, Metro buses make many Big Blue Bus stops, in addition to MTA stops.

==== Light rail ====
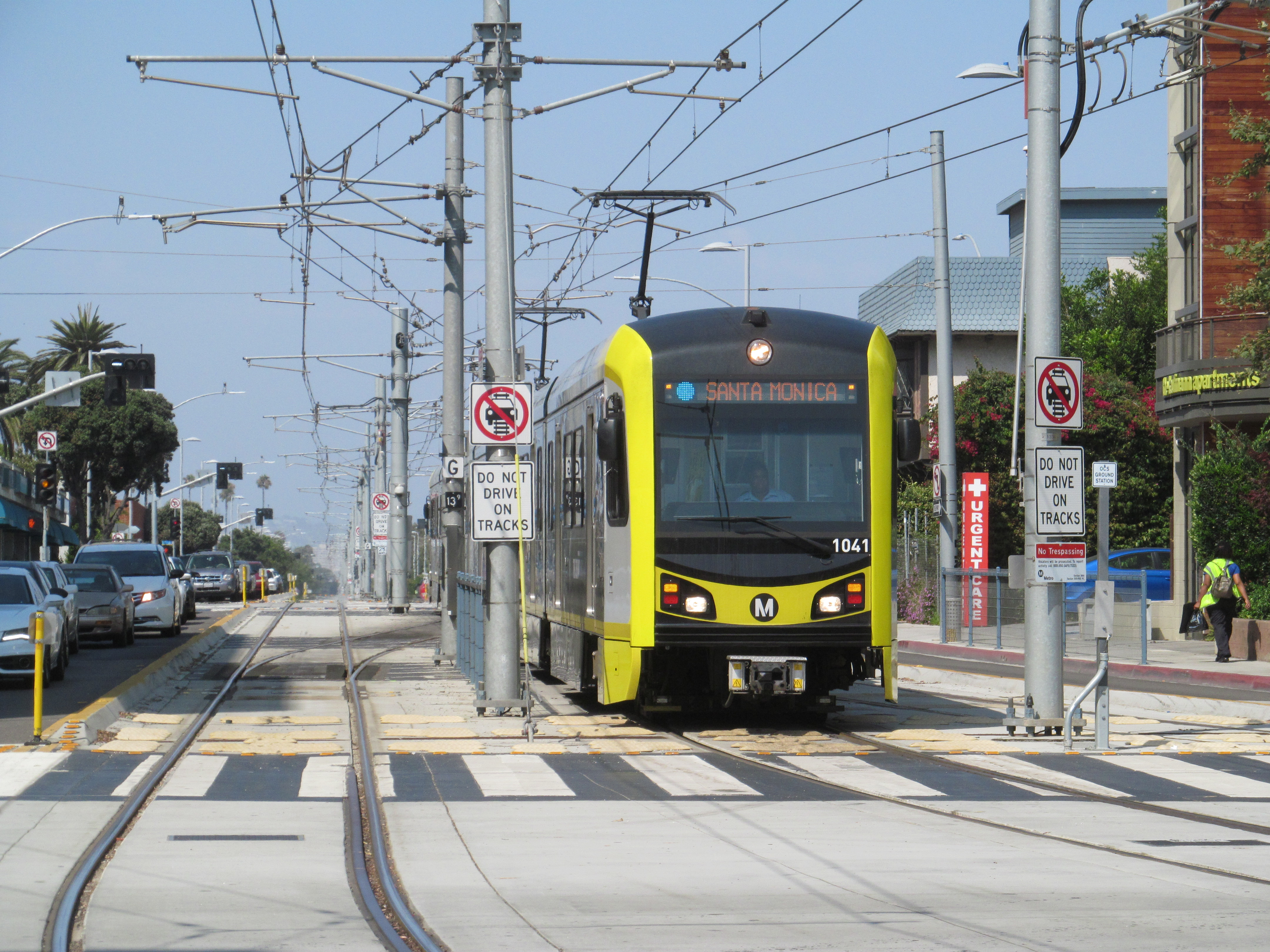
An E Line train of the Los Angeles Metro Rail at Downtown Santa Monica station

Design and construction on the 6.6-mile extension (10.6 km) of the Expo Line from Culver City to Santa Monica started in September 2011, with service beginning on May 20, 2016. Santa Monica Metro stations include Downtown Santa Monica, 17th Street/SMC, and 26th Street/Bergamot. Travel time between the Downtown Santa Monica station and 7th Street/Metro Center station in Downtown Los Angeles is approximately 46 minutes, while the travel time between the Downtown Santa Monica station and the terminal Atlantic station in East Los Angeles is approximately 1 hour and 9 minutes.

Historical aspects of the Expo line route are noteworthy. It uses the former Los Angeles region's electric interurban Pacific Electric Railway's right-of-way that ran from the Exposition Park area of Los Angeles to Santa Monica. This route was called the Santa Monica Air Line and provided electric-powered freight and passenger service between Los Angeles and Santa Monica beginning in the 1920s. Passenger service was discontinued in 1953, but diesel-powered freight deliveries to warehouses along the route continued until March 11, 1988. The abandonment of the line spurred future transportation considerations and concerns within the community, and the entire right-of-way was purchased from Southern Pacific by Los Angeles Metropolitan Transportation Authority. The line was built in 1875 as the steam-powered Los Angeles and Independence Railroad to bring mining ore to ships in Santa Monica harbor and as a passenger excursion train to the beach.

Since the mid-1980s, various proposals have been made to extend the Purple Line subway to Santa Monica under Wilshire Boulevard. The current D Line Extension will end the West LA VA Medical Center, about two miles east of Santa Monica.

==== Airport and ports ====
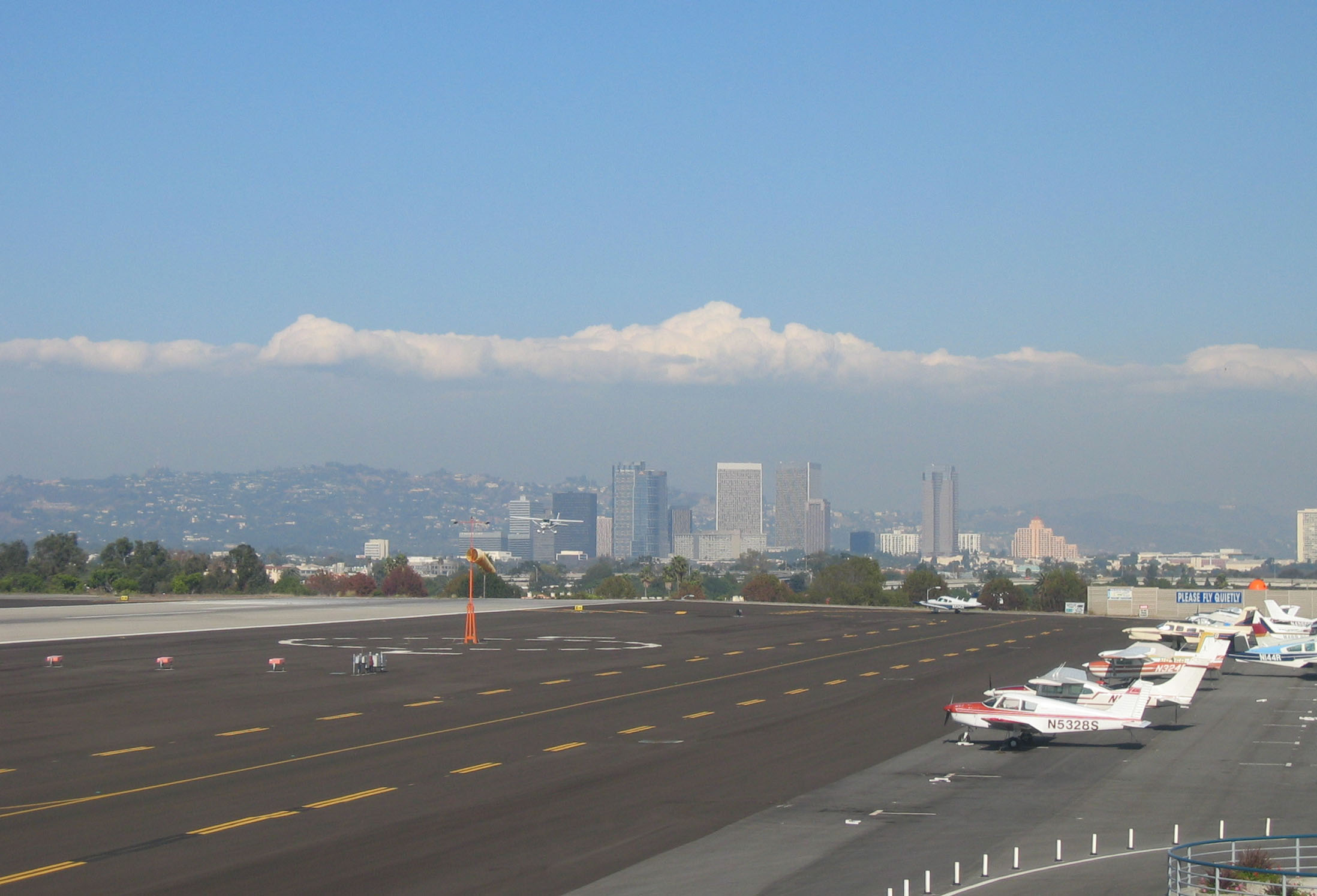
A view of Santa Monica Airport looking east towards Century City

The city owns and operates a general aviation airport, Santa Monica Airport, which has been the site of several important aviation achievements. Commercial flights are available for residents at LAX, a few miles south of Santa Monica.

Like other cities in Los Angeles County, Santa Monica is dependent upon the Port of Long Beach and the Port of Los Angeles for international ship cargo. In the 1890s, Santa Monica was once in competition with Wilmington, California, and San Pedro for recognition as the "Port of Los Angeles" (see History of Santa Monica, California).

==== Other ====
In August 2018, Santa Monica issued permits to Bird, Lime, Lyft, and Jump Bikes to operate dockless scooter-sharing systems in the city. As of April 2023, Lyft, Spin, Veo, and Wheels are licensed to provide micro-mobility transportation in city.

=== Emergency services ===
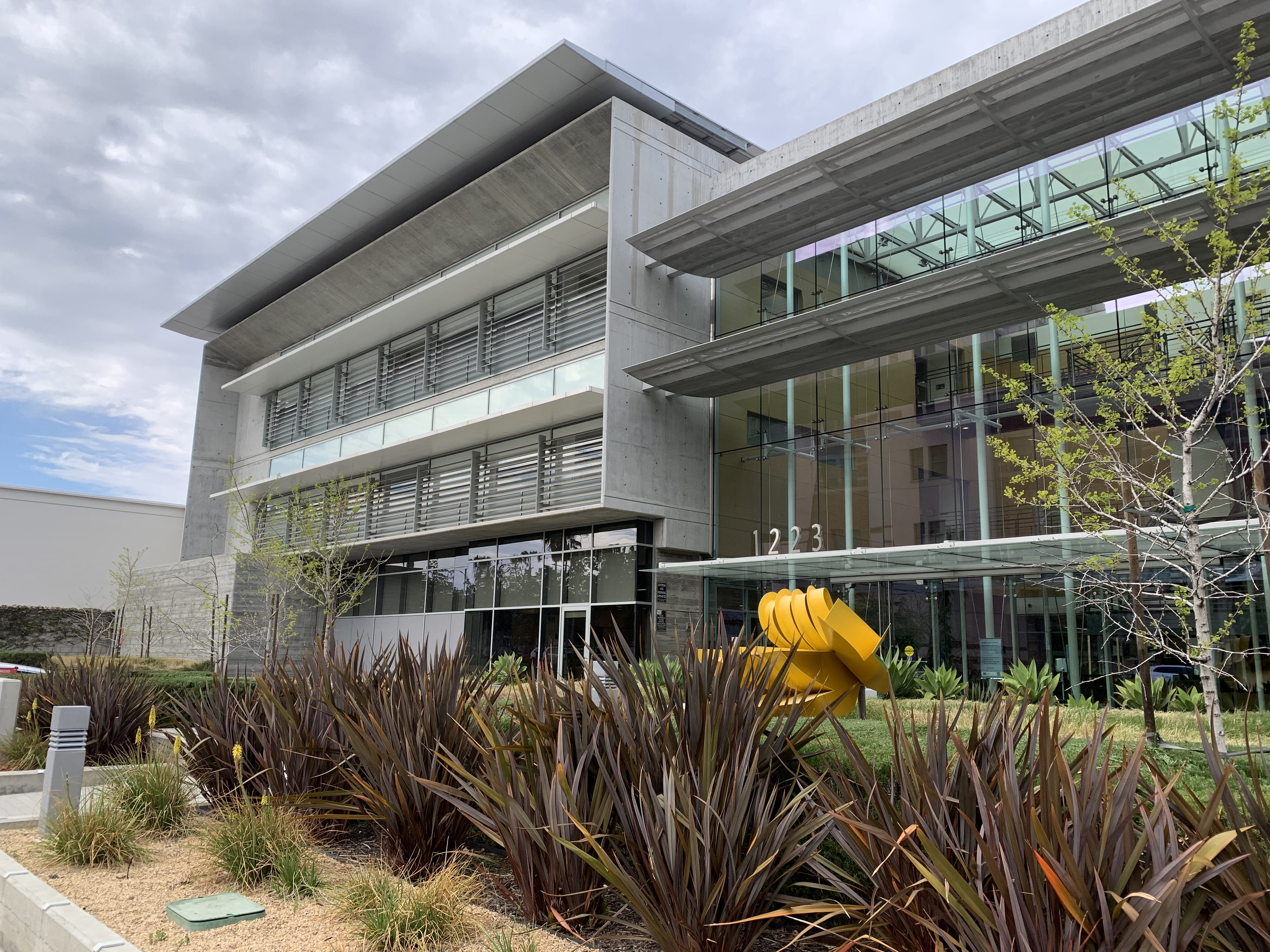
UCLA Medical Center, Santa Monica

Two major hospitals are within the Santa Monica city limits, UCLA Medical Center, Santa Monica and Saint John's Health Center. Four fire stations provide medical and fire response, staffed with six Paramedic Engines, a Truck company, a Hazardous Materials team, and an Urban Search & Rescue team. Santa Monica Fire Department has its own Dispatch Center. Ambulance transportation is provided by McCormick Ambulance Services.

Law enforcement services are provided by the Santa Monica Police Department

The Los Angeles County Department of Health Services operates the Simms/Mann Health and Wellness Center in Santa Monica. The Department's West Area Health Office is in the Simms/Mann Center.

=== Internet services ===
Santa Monica has a municipal wireless network which provides several free city Wi-Fi hotspots distributed around the city.

== In popular culture ==
=== Film and television ===
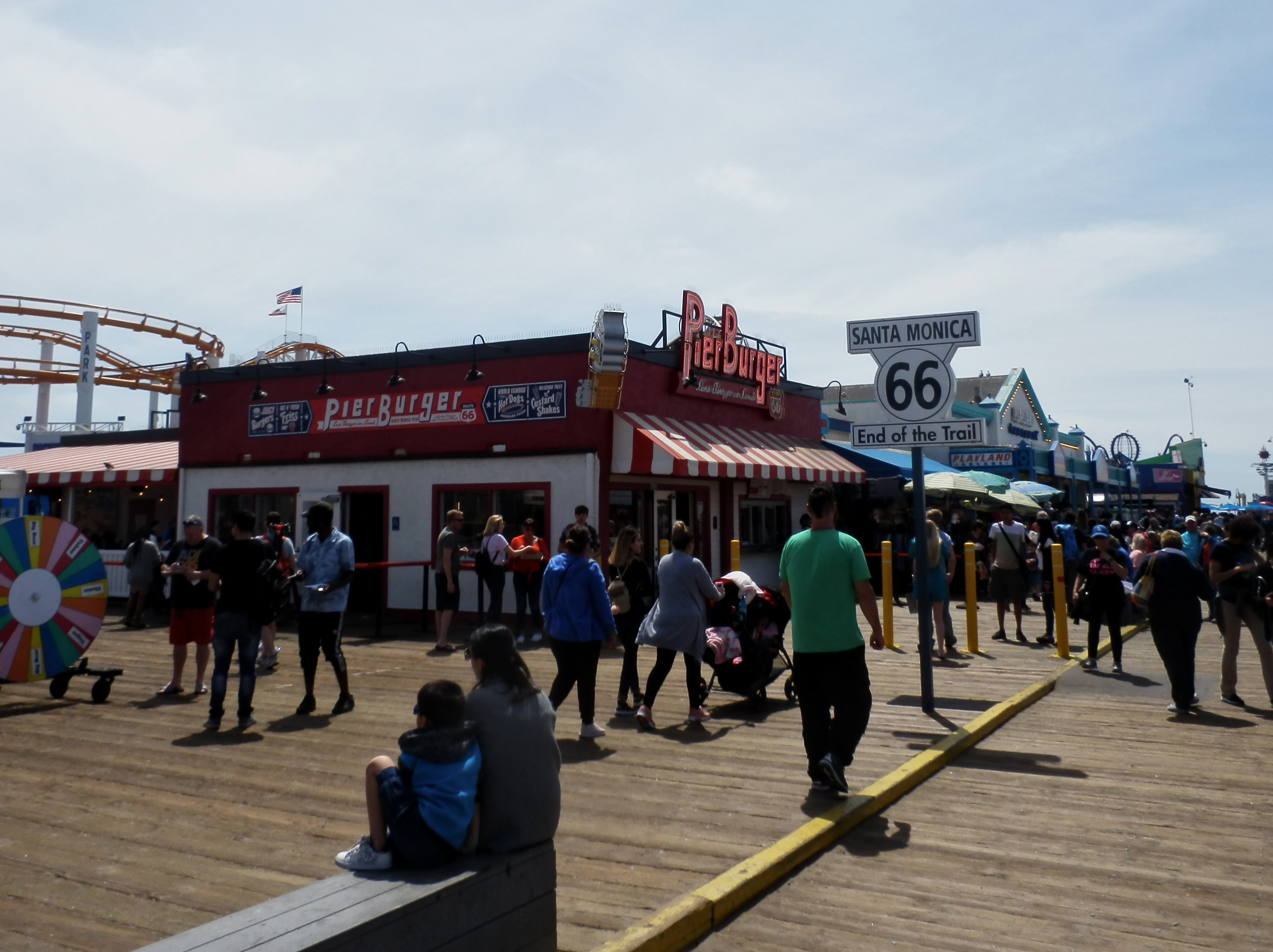
End of Route 66

Hundreds of films have been shot or set in part in Santa Monica.

==== Films ====
One of the oldest exterior shots in Santa Monica is Buster Keaton's Spite Marriage (1929) which shows much of 2nd Street. The comedy It's a Mad, Mad, Mad, Mad World (1963) included several scenes shot in Santa Monica, including those along the California Incline, which led to the movie's treasure spot, "The Big W". The Sylvester Stallone film Rocky III (1982) shows Rocky Balboa and Apollo Creed training to fight Clubber Lang by running on the Santa Monica Beach, and Stallone's Demolition Man (1993) includes Santa Monica settings. In Pee-wee's Big Adventure (1985), the theft of Pee-wee's bike occurs on the Third Street Promenade.

Henry Jaglom's indie Someone to Love (1987), the last film in which Orson Welles appeared, takes place in Santa Monica's venerable Mayfair Theatre. Heathers (1988) used Santa Monica's John Adams Middle School for many exterior shots. The Truth About Cats & Dogs (1996) is set entirely in Santa Monica, particularly the Palisades Park area, and features a radio station that resembles KCRW at Santa Monica College. 17 Again (2009) was shot at Samohi. Other films that show significant exterior shots of Santa Monica include, Species (1995), Get Shorty (1995), Ocean's Eleven (2001) and Barbie (2023). Richard Rossi's biopic Sister Aimee: The Aimee Semple McPherson Story opens and closes at the beach in Santa Monica, and his film Canaan Land features the lead characters on a date at the pier.

The documentary Dogtown and Z-Boys (2001) and the related dramatic film Lords of Dogtown (2005) are both about the influential skateboarding culture of Santa Monica's Ocean Park neighborhood in the 1970s.

Santa Monica (and in particular the Santa Monica Airport) was featured in Roland Emmerich's disaster film 2012 (2009). A magnitude 10.9 earthquake destroys the airport and the surrounding area as a group of survivors escapes in a personal plane. The Santa Monica Pier and the whole city sink into the Pacific Ocean in the aftermath.

==== Television ====
A number of television series have been set in Santa Monica, including Baywatch, Goliath, Pacific Blue (1996–2000), Private Practice (2007–2013), and Three's Company (1977–1984), which was set in the Ocean Park neighborhood of Santa Monica.

=== Literature ===
Horace McCoy's 1935 novel They Shoot Horses, Don't They? is set at a dance marathon held in a ballroom on the Santa Monica Pier.

Raymond Chandler's most famous character, private detective Philip Marlowe, frequently has a portion of his adventures in a place called "Bay City", which is modeled on Depression-era Santa Monica. In Marlowe's world, Bay City is "a wide-open town", where gambling and other crimes thrive due to a massively corrupt and ineffective police force.

Tennessee Williams lived (while working at MGM Studios) in a hotel on Ocean Avenue in the 1940s. At that location, he wrote the play The Glass Menagerie (which premiered in 1944). His short story "The Mattress by the Tomato Patch" (1954) is set near Santa Monica Beach and mentions the clock visible in much of the city, high up on The Broadway Building, on Broadway near Second Street.

=== Music ===
Notable locations

- The band Linkin Park is named in homage to Santa Monica's Lincoln Park (now called Christine Emerson Reed Park).
- The National Academy of Recording Arts and Sciences is based in Santa Monica on Olympic Boulevard.
- Universal Music Group is based in Santa Monica. Several of its labels, such as A&M Records, Aftermath Entertainment (started by Dr. Dre), G-Unit Records (created by 50 Cent & Sha Money XL), Geffen Records, Interscope (started by Jimmy Iovine), and Shady Records, are based in Santa Monica, CA.

==== Works ====
- The folk Australian duo Angus and Julia Stone has a single titled "Santa Monica Dream" on its album Down the Way.
- The ska/reggae band Bedouin Soundclash has a song called "Santa Monica", from their album Root Fire.
- The band Everclear released a song titled "Santa Monica" in 1995, which became their first mainstream hit.
- The British singer-songwriter Noel Harrison released a song and album titled Santa Monica Pier (1968).
- In 1948, bandleader Kay Kyser released a 78 record of the novelty song "When Veronica Plays the Harmonica (Down at the Pier in Santa Monica)".
- One of the few songs musical satirist Tom Lehrer has recorded since the 1970s is a tribute to the holidays of the Jewish calendar called "I'm Spending Hanukkah in Santa Monica".
- Richard Rossi released a song called "Santa Monica", celebrating the Santa Monica Pier, on his album Seasons of My Heart. The song is featured in Rossi's feature film Canaan Land.
- The Australian pop duo Savage Garden released a song titled "Santa Monica" from their self-titled 1997 debut album.
- The modern rock band Theory of a Deadman's song "Santa Monica" is a first-person account of a girl leaving her significant other to start a new life in Santa Monica.
- French Rapper Moha La Squale released the song "Santa Monica" in 2019.

== Sister cities ==
- Mazatlán, Mexico (1961)
- Hamm, Germany (1969)
- Fujinomiya, Japan (1975)
- Brighton and Hove, United Kingdom (2023)

== See also ==
- 2013 Santa Monica shootings
- Aragon Ballroom (Ocean Park, Santa Monica, California)
- Arcadia Bandini de Stearns Baker, co-founder and benefactress of Santa Monica
- List of cities and towns in California
- List of City of Santa Monica Designated Historic Landmarks
- List of people from Santa Monica, California
- List of public art in Santa Monica, California
- Muscle Beach
