= List of municipal parks in Santa Monica =

This is a list of Santa Monica municipal parks. Santa Monica is an incorporated city in western Los Angeles County, California, United States. The city operates 27 parks within city limits.

Park	Image	Address	Notes
Airport Park		3201 Airport Avenue	Next to the Santa Monica Airport
Ashland Park		1605 Ashland Avenue	Small residential neighborhood park
Barnard Way Linear Park		2440 Barnard Way	Beachfront park
Beach Green		2400 Barnard Way	Beachfront park
Beach Park 1		2600 Barnard Way	Beachfront park known locally as Dorothy Green Park
Chess Park		1652 Ocean Front Walk	Beachfront park; the city removed tables, chairs and chess implements in early March 2022 due to crime problems it is now described by the city as "flexible, nonprogrammed beachfront open space, open to diverse users."
Clover Park		2600 Ocean Park Boulevard	Park with recreational amenities
Colorado Center Park		26th Street & Broadway	Urban park with recreational amenities
Douglas Park		2439 Wilshire Boulevard	Neighborhood park; originally Padre Park, with a lawn bowling pitch
Euclid Park		1523 Euclid Street	Small neighborhood park; includes the Euclid Community Garden
Gandara Park		1819 Stewart Street	Neighborhood park with sports facilities
Goose Egg Park		600 Palisades Avenue	Small residential neighborhood pocket park in a roundabout
Historic Belmar Park		1840 4th Street	Park with multi-purpose sports facilities and art installations on the site of an historic African American neighborhood
Ishihara Park		2909 Exposition Boulevard	Modern park with outdoor "garden rooms" and playgrounds; includes the Ishihara Park Learning Garden
Joslyn Park		633 Kensington Road	Neighborhood park with recreational amenities; includes the Herb Katz Dog Park and a community center
Los Amigos Park		500 Hollister Avenue	Park centered on sports amenities that shares access with the Santa Monica-Malibu School District
Marine Park		1406 Marine Street	Park with recreational amenities; includes the Marine Park Community Garden
Memorial Park		1401 Olympic Boulevard	Park with indoor gym and outdoor sports facilities.
Ocean View Park		2701 Barnard Way	Beachfront park with sports facilities and a spiral walkway
Ozone Park		727 Ozone Street	Small neighborhood park bordering Venice
Palisades Park		Ocean Avenue	Iconic park along Ocean Avenue with beach views, artworks, monuments and a rose garden; includes the Santa Monica Camera Obscura, adjacent to the Santa Monica Pier; formerly Linda Vista Park
Park Drive Park		2415 Broadway	Small neighborhood park; includes the Park Drive Community Garden
Reed Park		1133 Seventh Street	Neighborhood park with sports facilities; includes the Miles Memorial Playhouse
Schader Park		1425 Cloverfield Boulevard	Small neighborhood park
South Beach Park		3400 Barnard Way	Beachfront park bordering Venice
Tongva Park		1615 Ocean Avenue	Modern urban park with unique structures, sculptures and sustainable plants and trees near the Santa Monica Pier.
Virginia Avenue Park		2200 Virginia Avenue	community park which hosts the Pico Farmers Market; includes the Pico Branch Library and the Thelma Terry Building

The city also operates five community gardens. The Community Garden Program began with the construction of the Main Street Community Garden in 1976, the other four are located in Euclid, Ishihara, Marine, and Park Drive parks.

The California Department of Parks and Recreation operates the Santa Monica State Beach within the city limits.
