= 26th Street/Bergamot station =

Light rail station

26th St/Bergamot
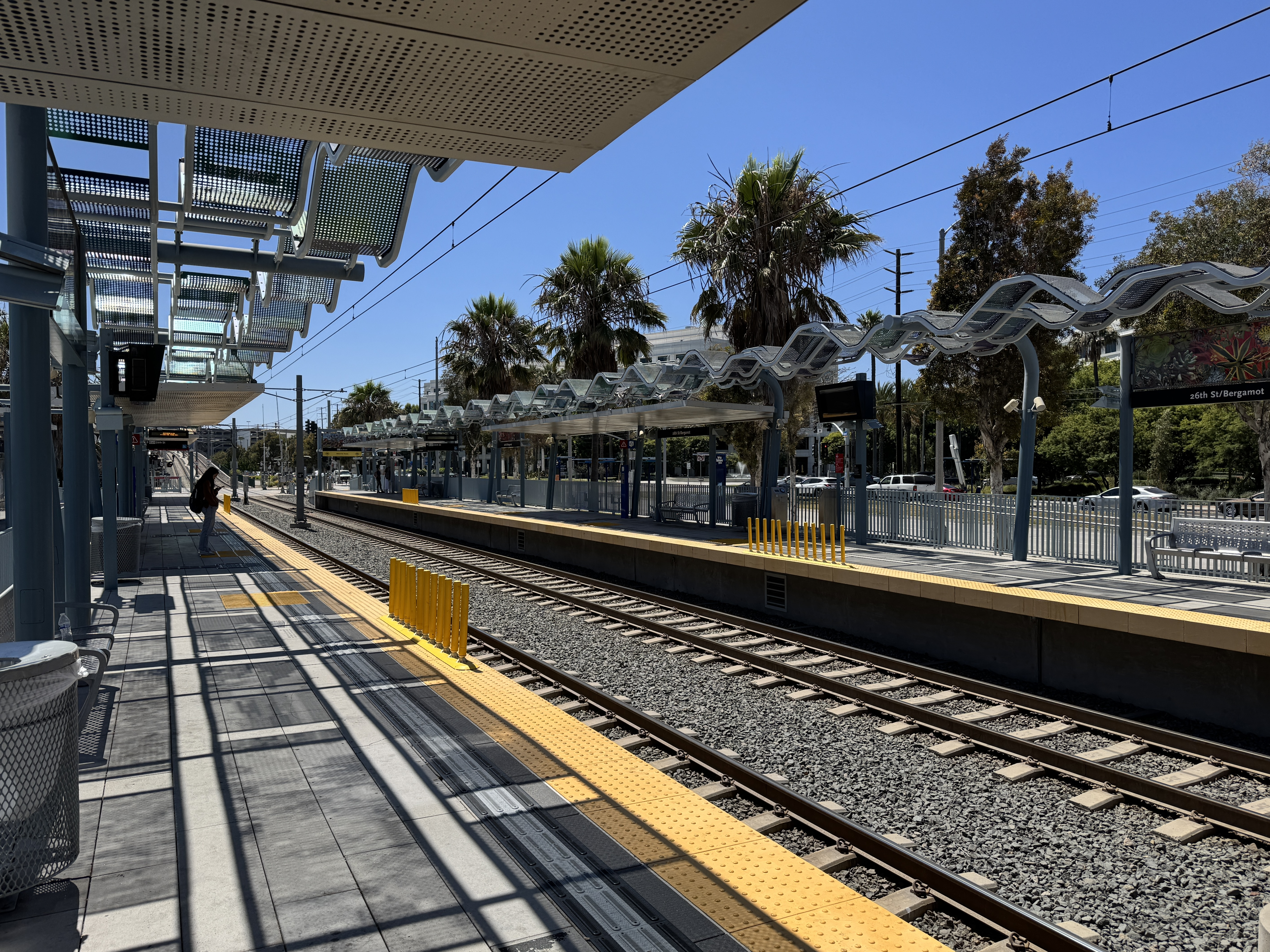
- 26th St/Bergamot station platform, July 2025

General information
- Location: 2425 Olympic Boulevard; Santa Monica, California
- Coordinates: 34.0279°N 118.4699°W
- Owner: Los Angeles County Metropolitan Transportation Authority
- Platforms: 2 side platforms
- Tracks: 2
- Connections: Big Blue Bus

Construction
- Cycle facilities: Racks and lockers
- Accessible: Yes

History
- Opened: October 17, 1875
- Rebuilt: May 20, 2016
- Former names: Bergamot

Passengers
- FY 2025: 1,020 (avg. wkdy boardings)

Services
Preceding station	Metro Rail	Following station
17th Street/SMC toward Downtown Santa Monica	E Line	Expo/Bundy toward East LA
Former services
Preceding station	Pacific Electric	Following station
Sunset toward Rustic Canyon	Air Line	Bundy toward Pacific Electric Building
Location

26th Street/Bergamot station is an at-grade light rail station in the Los Angeles Metro Rail system. It is located near the intersection of 26th Street and Olympic Boulevard in Santa Monica, California and near the Bergamot Station Arts Center, after which the station is named. The station is served by the E Line.

== Service ==
=== Station layout ===
The station is in the Pico District of Santa Monica, along the southern edge of Olympic Boulevard, just east of 26th Street.

The City of Santa Monica refers to the station area as the "Bergamot Transit Village". It is also within walking distance of several business offices and studios, including the Water Garden office complex, as well as several parks.

The station has entrances on both ends.

=== Hours and frequency ===
E Line service hours are from approximately 4:30 a.m. and 11:45 p.m daily. Trains operate every 8 minutes during peak hours, Monday to Friday. Trains run every 10 minutes, during midday on weekdays and weekends, from 9:00 a.m. to 7:00 p.m. Night and early morning service is approximately every 20 minutes every day.

=== Connections ===
As of December 15, 2024, the following connections are available:

- Big Blue Bus (Santa Monica): 5, 16, 43

== Notable places nearby ==
The station is within walking distance of the following notable places:

- Bergamot Station Arts Center
- Gandara Park
- Ishihara Park
- Virginia Avenue Park

== Name and history ==
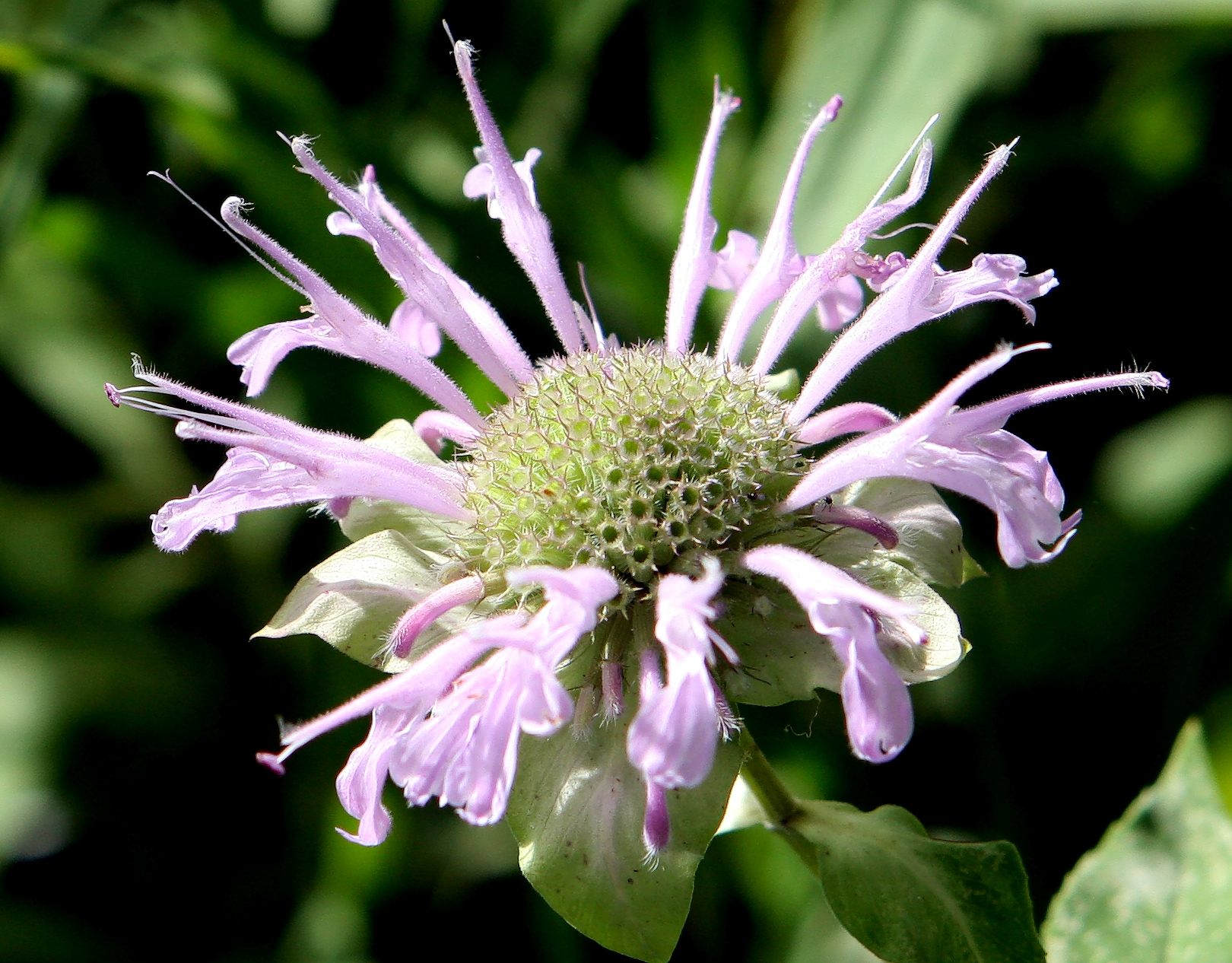
Wild Bergamot (Monarda fistulosa) still grows in clumps around the station area.

The name "Bergamot Station" dates back to 1890, and was a stop and car storage area on the steam powered Los Angeles and Independence Railroad from Santa Monica to downtown Los Angeles, as well as the subsequent Santa Monica Air Line on the Pacific Electric trolley system until 1953.

== Vehicle maintenance facility ==
Expo Phase 2 included a maintenance facility for Expo light-rail vehicles. This facility performs shop-related activities, including servicing, cleaning, inspecting, and repairing LRT vehicles. It also includes a yard with a storage capacity of up to 45 LRT vehicles.

Several locations for this facility were proposed and evaluated, including the "Verizon site" (land just east of Bergamot Station, between Stewart Street and Centinela Avenue) and the Bergamot Station site. Many residents of the surrounding Stewart Park neighborhood opposed the use of the Verizon site, who feared the project would create noise and another environmental impact. The use of the Bergamot Station site was opposed by artists at Bergamot Station, who successfully argued that Bergamot had become an irreplaceable resource for the west coast art community.

The City of Santa Monica and Expo built the facility on land which includes the Verizon site, as well as land that was a parking lot owned by Santa Monica College. They believe that with this "hybrid site", most environmental impacts from the facility were properly mitigated.
