= Sawtelle Boulevard =

Thoroughfare in Los Angeles

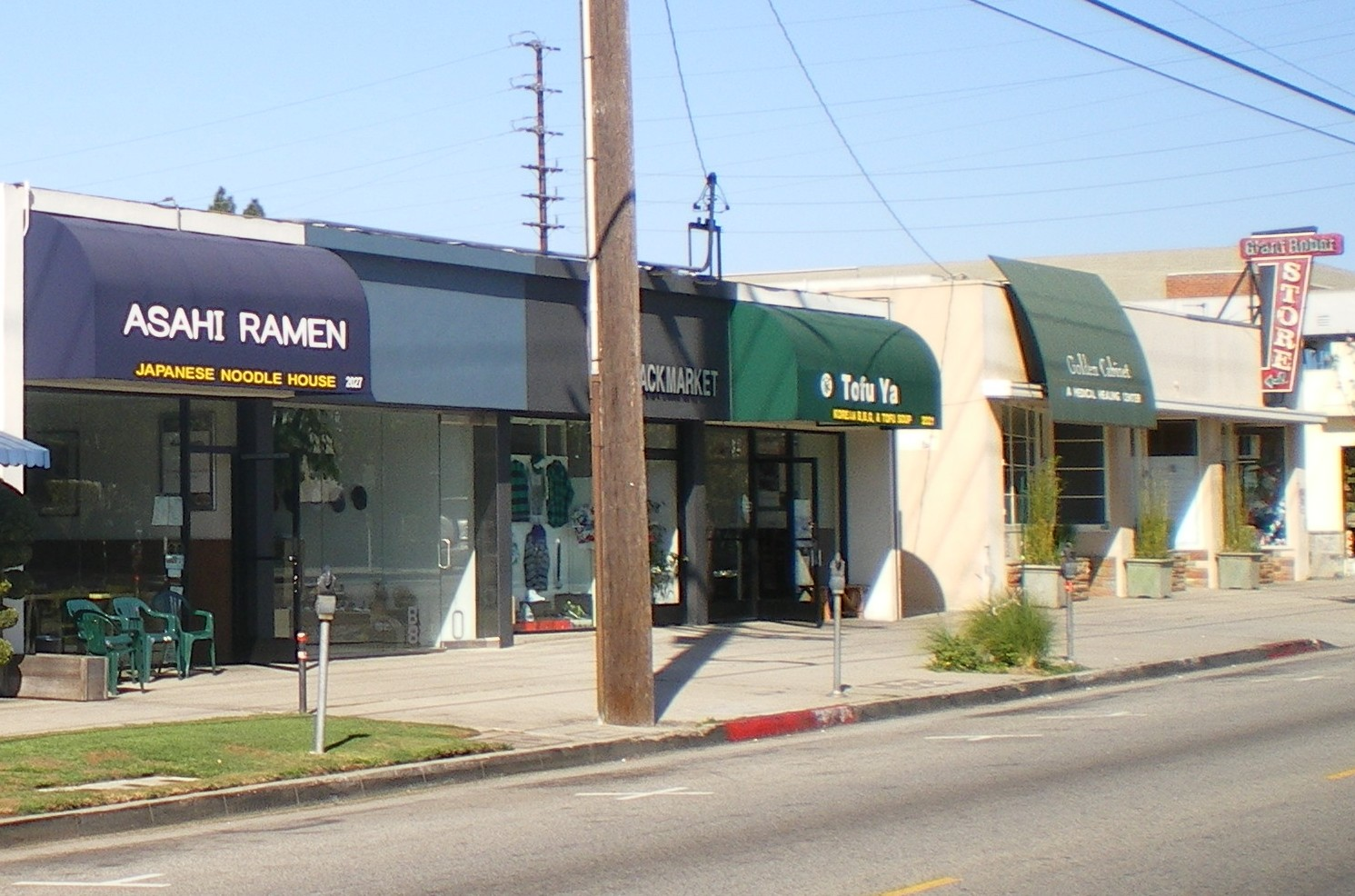
- Japanese businesses on Sawtelle Blvd.
- South end: 33.9952°N 118.3904°W
- North end: 34.0510°N 118.4524°W

Sawtelle Boulevard is a north/south street in the Westside region of the city of Los Angeles, California. For most of its length, it parallels the San Diego Freeway (Interstate 405), one block to the west.

The street has important Japanese American cultural and historical significance.

== Route ==
Sawtelle Boulevard’s northern end is north of Dowlen Drive within the Los Angeles Veterans Administration complex (which it enters at Ohio Avenue), and its southern end is at Overland Avenue, a few blocks east of Sepulveda Boulevard. Sawtelle Boulevard is a major thoroughfare for the Sawtelle community and West Los Angeles neighborhood.

The portion of Sawtelle Boulevard from Santa Monica Boulevard to Olympic Boulevard is a trendy spot for the newer Japanese American community in Los Angeles. Officially named Sawtelle Japantown, but often called simply Sawtelle or Little Osaka - not to be confused with downtown Los Angeles’ older, larger Little Tokyo, or Japantown, San Francisco, California, Sawtelle is relatively near UCLA, Santa Monica, and Culver City. As of 2012, businesses found on this street include Japanese fast food (curry and ramen), two Japanese supermarkets, upscale sushi bars, a holistic and medical office, hair salons, neighborhood Japanese grocery stores, a Boba tea shop, anime shops, Japanese artisan stores, temples, and a few historic plant nurseries. In recent years, the businesses have expanded to Korean and Chinese cuisines with popular restaurants including Seoul Tofu and ROC Kitchen. The neighborhood appeals to a wide demographic with cheap eat as well as upscale restaurants and a banquet center on the corner of Olympic Boulevard and Sawtelle Boulevard. One interesting site was the consulate of Saudi Arabia, prior to relocated to Wilshire Blvd location, being next to a ramen restaurant and an esoteric Japanese magazine store.

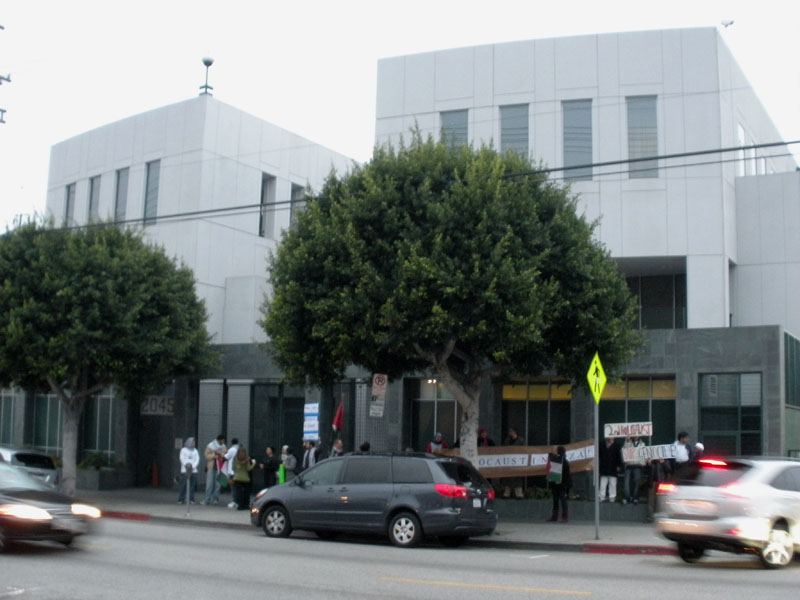
Saudi Arabia Los Angeles Consulate-General former location on Sawtelle Blvd

Homes south of this portion of Sawtelle Boulevard are inhabited by a large Japanese American population. Many of the homes exhibit gardens and landscapes true to Japanese tradition.

After passing Olympic Boulevard, Sawtelle Boulevard continues as a four-lane boulevard running parallel to the San Diego Freeway and Sepulveda Boulevard. After entering Culver City, Sawtelle Boulevard swerves east, crosses Sepulveda Boulevard and ends at Overland Avenue in Culver City.

== See also ==
- Sawtelle, Los Angeles
- Little Tokyo
- Sawtelle Japantown Guide
- Map of Sawtelle Japantown, West Los Angeles

== In popular culture ==
- In Robert A. Heinlein's The Door into Summer, the main character visits a cryogenics facility located on Sawtelle Boulevard.
