= Stoner Park =

Public park in Los Angeles, California

- Interactive map of Stoner Park
- Type: Urban park
- Location: West Los Angeles, Los Angeles
- Coordinates: 34.038042287314276°N 118.45415371869923°W

Stoner Park, located at 1835 Stoner Avenue in the West Los Angeles, is 8.65-acre park facility that includes the Stoner Recreation Center, Stoner Park Skate Plaza, Stoner Park Pool, baseball, football, and soccer fields.

== History ==
Stoner Park is named after Stoner Avenue which was named after Albert J. Stoner. Stoner Avenue runs along the northeast side of Stoner Park. Before being named after AJ Stoner, Stoner Ave. was known as 12th street. In 1919, several Sawtelle streets were renamed for Civil War battles including 12th Street which became Carthage Ave. After Sawtelle merged with Los Angeles, Carthage became 112th street. In 1925, it was officially renamed Stoner Ave. after AJ Stoner, a pillar of the Sawtelle community, as a proprietor of a lumber business and the last president of the Sawtelle Chamber of Commerce and a key supporter of the annexation of Sawtelle into Los Angeles.

In 1923, Sawtelle businessman Walter Armacost advocated the purchase of 40 acres for the playground.

In 1925, the Los Angeles Playground Commission bought 10 acres for a new playground from Burns and Overcash at 112th street and Missouri avenues in Sawtelle. This land is the basis for Stoner Park.

Stoner Park became a park 1926, opening for the first time for a baseball game. The Stoner Recreation Center was originally known as the West Los Angeles community Building and Plunge (Pool).

== Amenities ==
Stoner Park includes one large play area with a sand surface for children about 2 years and up.

The Stoner Park Pool is an aquatic playground that includes wading pools, fountains, and a water slide. Stoner Recreation Center and Pool offer swimming classes and a junior lifeguard program.

The Stoner Park skatepark, known as Stoner Park Skate Plaza, opening in 2010, was designed and built by California Skateparks.

Stoner Park contains a Japanese Garden designed and planted by the local Japanese community.
