= A. W. Barrett =

American politician (1845–1905)

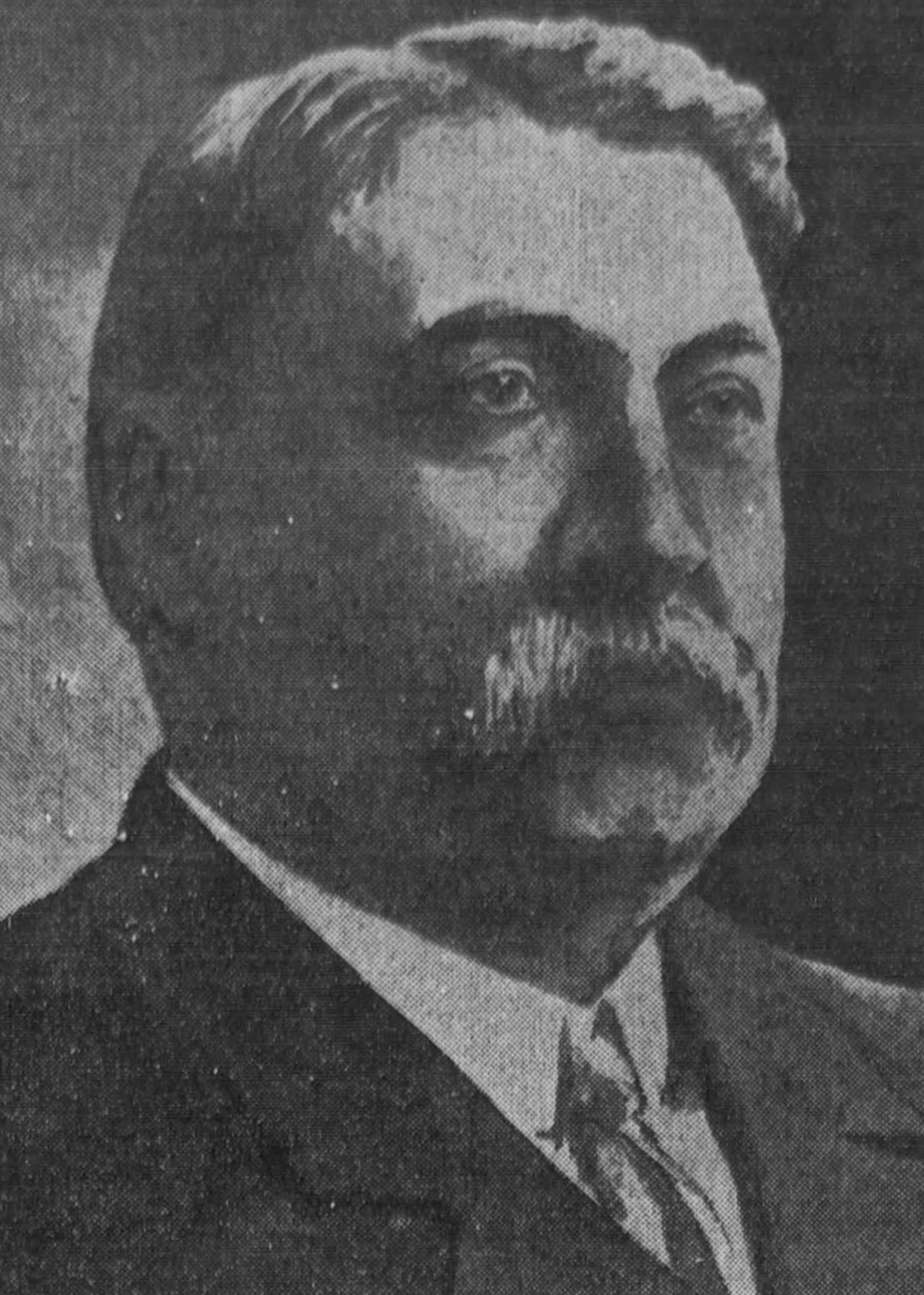

Member of the Los Angeles Common Council from the 5th ward
- In office December 12, 1887 – February 21, 1889
- Succeeded by: District abolished

Personal details
- Born: March 8, 1845 Stockholm, New York
- Died: August 17, 1905 (aged 60) Los Angeles, California
- Party: Democratic

Andrew Washington Barrett (March 8, 1845 – August 17, 1905) was a prominent Los Angeles businessman, adjutant general of the California National Guard, director of the Sawtelle Veterans Home, member of the governing body of the city of Los Angeles and a California state public official.

== Early life and career ==
Barrett was born on March 8, 1845, in Stockholm, New York, to Joseph Beeman Barrett and Mehitable or Mahitable Noyes. The family moved to McGregor, Iowa, in 1857.

== Civil War ==
Barrett served in the Union Army in the Civil War. He joined the Iowa Infantry in 1861 at the age of 16 in Company D, 3rd Iowa Volunteer Infantry, and reenlisted when that 3-year term expired. The depleted 3rd Iowa was then transferred into the 2nd Iowa. (This merged regiment is sometimes referred to as the "2nd and 3rd Veteran Infantry Consolidated")

== Postwar ==
After the Civil War, Barrett returned to Iowa, and in 1868 he went to Galveston, Texas, where he "engaged in the cattle business, in which he was very successful," and then to Crawfordsville, Indiana, where he was a large-scale railroad contractor. In 1878, Barrett joined the silver rush in Leadville, Colorado, and he "acquired large holdings of mining properties."

== Los Angeles ==
In 1882 he came to Los Angeles (as Andrew Washington Barrett).

=== Railway ===
From 1882 to 1887, Barrett was superintendent of Moses Sherman and Clark's Los Angeles Consolidated Electric Railway Company. In Barrett's obituary, the Los Angeles Times said of him:

For five years he was superintendent of the Los Angeles railway system, and it was under his management that the Westlake lines, the Second-street line, the Central-avenue and Maple-avenue lines were constructed. He did very much to develop the street car system of this city.

=== Town of Barrett ===
In 1896, R. F. Jones and R. C. Gillis of the Pacific Land Company purchased a 225-acre (0.91 km^{2}) tract, which lay just south of the Soldier's Home from Sherman and Clark. Jones and Gillis secured from the management of the Soldier's Home permission for members to build houses and reside outside of the reservation without losing their membership in the Soldier's Home.

In 1897, the Pacific Land Company hired S. H. Taft, who had been involved in the development of the town of Humboldt, Iowa, to build a new town named Barrett, after Gen. A. W. Barrett, Local Manager of the Soldiers Home and friend of R. C. Gillis.

When Taft attempted to secure a post office for the new town, the postal authorities objected to the name "Barrett" on account of its similarity to Bassett. In 1899, the name of the town was formally changed to Sawtelle (for W. E. Sawtelle who superseded Taft as manager of the Pacific Land Company).

=== Appointments ===
Date	Appointment
1886	Quartermaster of Grand Army of the Republic (GAR)
1888–1889	Los Angeles Common Council
1892–1898	Member National Home for Disabled Volunteer Soldiers Board of Managers.
1894	Aide-de-camp to the Commander-in-Chief GAR
1895–1898	Adjutant General California National Guard
1898–1902	Director California State Board of Agriculture
1898–1902	Bank Commissioner California

=== Other ===
He engaged in the real-estate and insurance business both in Los Angeles and in San Francisco.

== Memberships ==
Barrett was president of the Pilgrim Club of Avalon. He was in the Elks, the Grand Army of the Republic, the Jonathan Club of Los Angeles and the Bohemian Club of San Francisco.

== Family ==
In 1866, Barrett married Lillie Jean Pierce (born 1848) in Humboldt County, Iowa, and they had two sons, Beeman Daniel (1866–1909) and Adelbert M. (born 1868). Barrett and Lillie were divorced by 1870.

In 1877, Barrett married Pauline Behne (born 1913) in Indianapolis, Indiana. They had one son, who died "in early youth." At the time of the elder Barrett's death, the couple were living at 1013 Burlington Avenue in the Echo Park district of Los Angeles.

They were avid fisherman and members of the Santa Catalina Island Tuna Club. Both held records for their catches.

Barrett died at Pacific Hospital in Los Angeles on August 17, 1905, at the age of 60, with the cause noted as "cystitis and other complications resulting from this trouble." He was interred at Rosedale Cemetery in Los Angeles, after a service conducted by the Reverend Baker P. Lee of Christ Church and military honors at the gravesite.
