= Mia Lehrer =

American landscape architect

Mia Lehrer, born Mía Guttfreund (San Salvador, El Salvador), is a Salvadoran American landscape architect. She received a Bachelor of Arts from Tufts University with a degree in environmental design and a Master of Landscape Architecture degree from Harvard University's Graduate School of Design. Lehrer is one of the first professionals to incorporate both of her degrees to design sustainable landscapes.

== Biography ==
Mía Guttfreund was born in the first half of the 1950s in San Salvador, capital of El Salvador. She is the daughter of German Jewish refugees who fled to Latin America because of Nazi persecution. Her parents did not have high school qualifications, but her father was able to find success in the export business. Her childhood would inspire her work later in life. She would later say that "nature was always present and palpable" and that she "was always aware of it and it was always on [her] mind." She also recalled how DDT had damaged coastal ecosystems and was impacted when experts worked to help reverse the damage. In the late 1970s, El Salvador was facing worsening political conflicts and Lehrer's father urged her to leave the country and complete her undergraduate studies in the United States.

Having immigrated to the United States, she went to Tufts University near Boston. She intended studying international relations or urban planning, and her senior thesis examined the impact that dams in El Salvador had had on communities and habitats. While attending a lecture at the Harvard Graduate School of Design, she found an exhibition of Frederick Law Olmsted's landscape drawings and after added encouragement from landscape architect Peter Walker, decided to go on to study landscape architecture. She completed her degree at Tufts and applied to the landscape design program at Harvard; There, she studied under Peter Walker and was influenced by the work of Ian McHarg and Cornelia Hahn Oberlander.

She met her husband, Los Angeles architect Michael B. Lehrer, at Harvard; after graduating, the couple relocated to Southern California and eventually settled in Los Angeles. Mia ran a private studio out of her home focused on residential landscape design. By the late 1980s, her interest in environmental issues and activist work as well as tree planting projects around the neighborhood connected her with Andy Lipkis, founder of TreePeople, who introduced her to sessions where government officials, engineers and activists were involved. These sessions led her to making the public realm a focus of her professional work rather than just her private work. During this time, she formalized her office and established a professional studio, Mia Lehrer + Associates, in 1995; this studio has evolved into Studio-MLA and now includes an office in San Francisco.

== Career ==
She is the founder and president of Mia Lehrer + Associates, a landscape architecture firm based in Los Angeles, California. Her breakthrough to public work was her work on the 2000 master plan for the Silver Lake Reservoir. Notable projects include the Annenberg Community Beach House, the revitalization of the San Pedro Waterfront, and 3.5 acres of outdoor gardens for the Natural History Museum of Los Angeles County. She designed Vista Hermosa Park, which was the first new public park in downtown Los Angeles in 100 years. More recently, Leher has been involved with the design and building of complex large-scale infrastructural projects. Lehrer was a key author of the 2007 Los Angeles River Revitalization Master Plan and has been working with the U.S. Army Corps of Engineers, the City of Los Angeles, and community groups on related reviving efforts for nearly 20 years. In 2010 she was named a fellow of the American Society of Landscape Architects.

On June 25, 2014, President Obama appointed her to serve a four-year term on the U.S. Commission of Fine Arts.

She won the competition to design the FaB Park on First and Broadway in Los Angeles. Her design proposal was among the four finalists.

In 2015, Lehrer served as one of six selection committee members for the Rudy Bruner Award for Urban Excellence.

Lehrer was appointed to the Board of Water and Power Commissioners by Los Angeles Mayor Eric Garcetti on September 24, 2020, and was confirmed by the Council on October 21, 2020, for a term lasting until June 30, 2024.

In 2021, Lehrer's Studio-MLA was selected to design the new Community Park as part of the Fair Park Master Plan in Dallas, Texas in partnership with Studio Outside of Dallas, architect Allison Grace Williams and Dallas architects buildingcommunityWORKSHOP as the core design team.

By 2022, Lehler designed the gardens of the Lucas Museum of Narrative Art in Exposition Park, Los Angeles, scheduled to open in 2025.

Lehrer is also a lecturer at the University of Southern California's School of Architecture.

== Awards ==
- 2021 Cooper Hewitt National Design Awards, Landscape Architecture, Mia Lehrer
- Merit Award for Institutional Design from the American Society of Landscape Architects, Southern California Chapter - for their design of the North Campus Garden at the Natural History Museum
- LA Design Festival ICON Award 2015
- ASLA 2009 Professional Awards- Analysis and Planning Category Honor Award - for Los Angeles River Revitalization Master Plan, Los Angeles, CA

== Projects ==
Project	City	Year
670 Mesquit / Arts Matrix	Hollywood	
Annenberg Community Beach House	Santa Monica	2009
Dodger Stadium	Los Angeles	
First and Broadway Park (FAB Park)	Los Angeles	In progress as of 2022
Natural History Museum Garden	Los Angeles	
Hollywood Park District	Inglewood	In construction as of 2022
Ishihara Park and Beach Improvements	Santa Monica	2017
John Anson Ford Theatres	Hollywood	2016
Los Angeles Federal Courthouse	Los Angeles	2016
Los Angeles River Greenway and Bike Path	Los Angeles	
Los Angeles River Revitalization Master Plan	Los Angeles	2007
Water + Life Museum and Campus	Hemet	
SoFi Stadium at Hollywood Park	Inglewood	2021
UC Irvine Naturescape	Irvine	
Los Angeles Union Station Master Plan	Los Angeles	2014
Orange County Great Park	Irvine	
Piggyback Yard Conceptual Master Plan	Los Angeles	2010
Piggyback Yard Feasibility Study	Los Angeles	2013
Santa Monica Village	Santa Monica	2014
Silver Lake Reservoir Path and Meadow	Los Angeles	2011
Vista Hermosa Natural Park	Los Angeles	2008

== See also ==
- List of California women architects
- Michael B. Lehrer
