= Expo/Bundy station =

Los Angeles Metro Rail station

Expo/Bundy
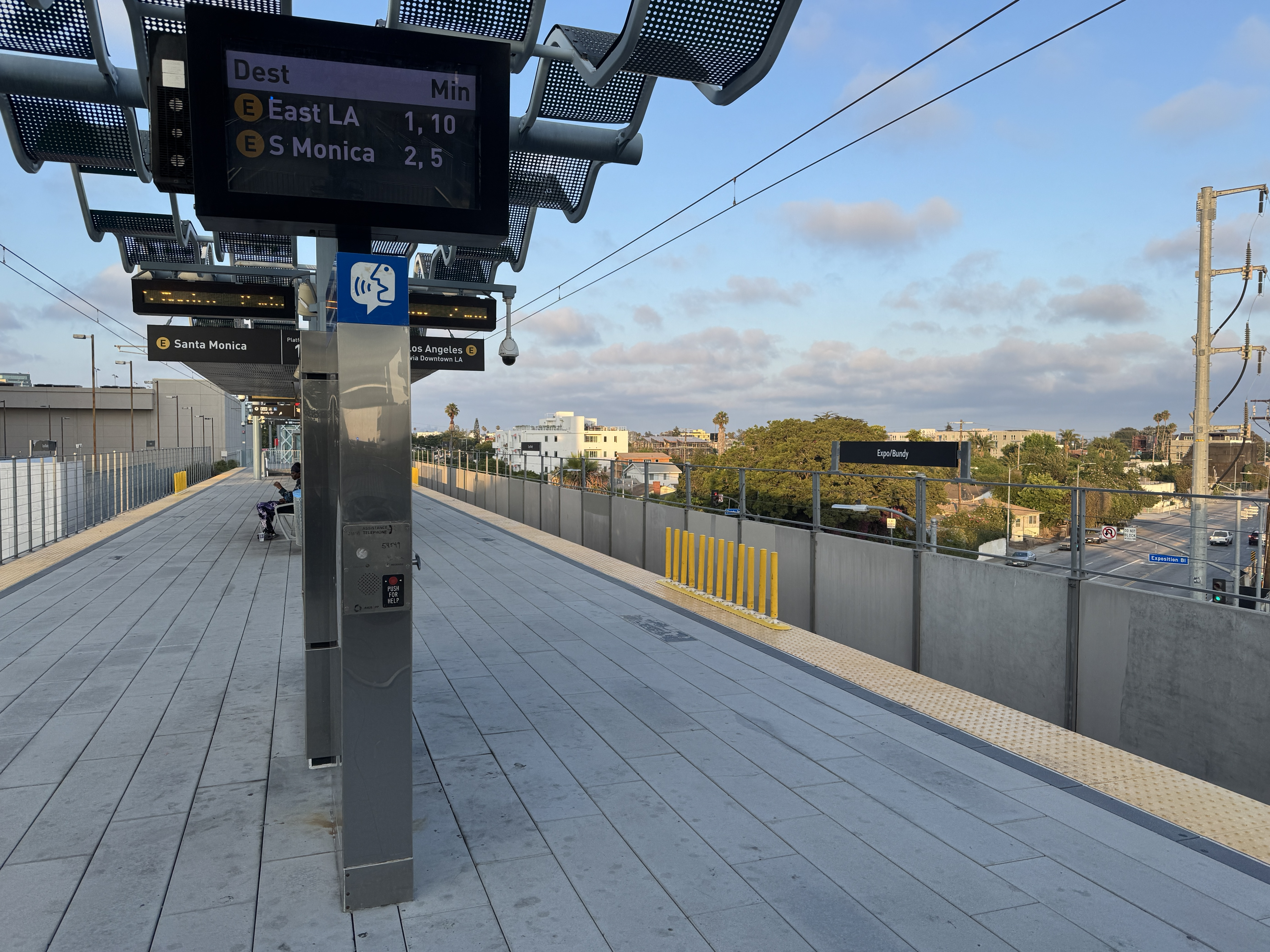
- Expo/Bundy station platform, July 2025

General information
- Location: 2101 Bundy Drive; Los Angeles, California
- Coordinates: 34.0316°N 118.4528°W
- Owner: Los Angeles County Metropolitan Transportation Authority
- Platforms: 1 island platform
- Tracks: 2
- Connections: Big Blue Bus

Construction
- Parking: 250 spaces
- Cycle facilities: Metro Bike Share station, racks and lockers
- Accessible: Yes

History
- Opened: October 17, 1875
- Rebuilt: May 20, 2016
- Former names: Bundy

Passengers
- FY 2025: 1,482 (avg. wkdy boardings)

Services
Preceding station	Metro Rail	Following station
26th Street/Bergamot toward Downtown Santa Monica	E Line	Expo/Sepulveda toward East LA
Former services
Preceding station	Pacific Electric	Following station
Bergamot toward Rustic Canyon	Air Line	Home Junction toward Pacific Electric Building
Location

Expo/Bundy station is an elevated light rail station in the Los Angeles Metro Rail system. It is located at the intersection of Bundy Drive and Exposition Boulevard in Sawtelle, a neighborhood in West Los Angeles, California. It serves the Metro E Line.

== Service ==
=== Station layout ===
This station is in West Los Angeles, on an elevated structure spanning Bundy Drive, just south of Olympic Boulevard. The area is a busy commercial center, with heavy traffic on nearby boulevards partly due to the two major freeways nearby. Directly to the west (across Centinela) is the site of Metro's Division 14 Maintenance Facility.

The elevated station structure stands 30 feet above Bundy Drive. To the east, the track descends a retained fill embankment before crossing Barrington Avenue. To the west, the track descends a retained fill embankment after crossing Centinela Avenue.

Parking is located at-grade in the right-of-way near the station.

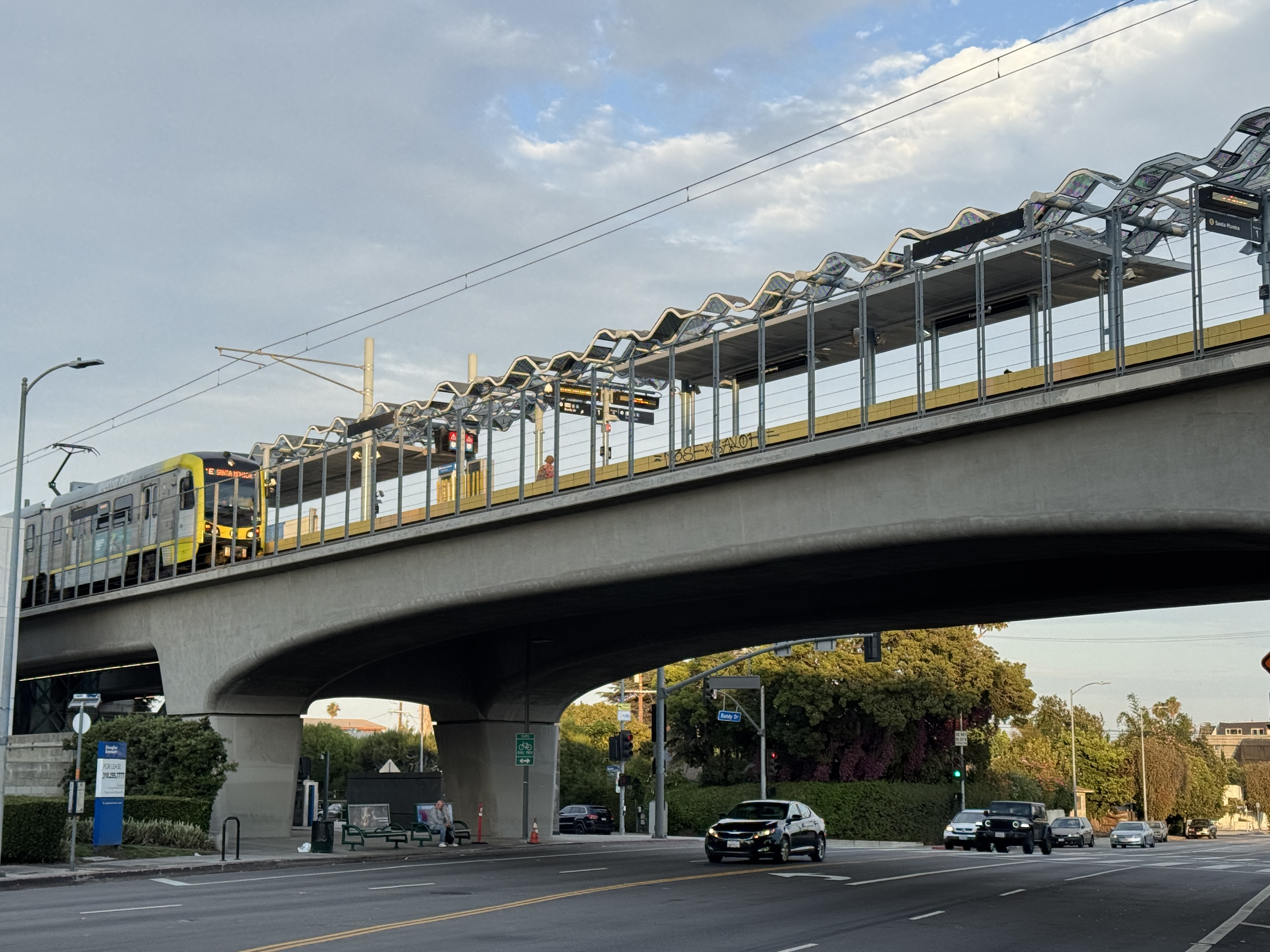
The elevated structure of the station, as seen from Bundy Drive.

=== Hours and frequency ===
E Line service hours are from approximately 4:30 a.m. and 11:45 p.m daily. Trains operate every 8 minutes during peak hours, Monday to Friday. Trains run every 10 minutes, during midday on weekdays and weekends, from 9:00 a.m. to 7:00 p.m. Night and early morning service is approximately every 20 minutes every day.

=== Connections ===
As of December 15, 2024, the following connections are available:

- Big Blue Bus (Santa Monica): 5, Rapid 10, 14, 15
