= Koning Eizenberg Architecture =

Architectural firm located in Santa Monica, California, United States

Coordinates: 34.03135333840696°N 118.47409272968015°W

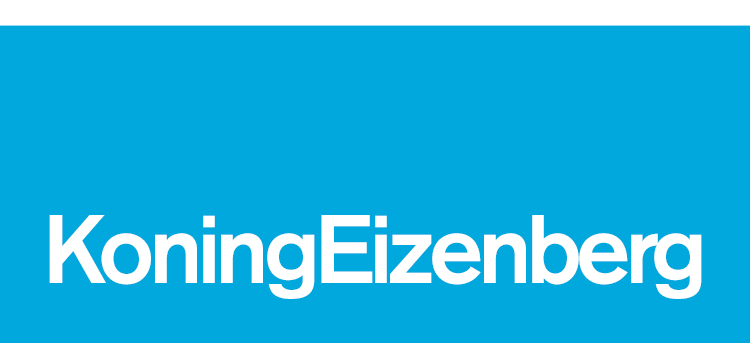
- Industry: Architecture
- Founders: Julie Eizenberg, Hank Koning
- Headquarters: Santa Monica, California, United States of America
- Website: www.kearch.com

Koning Eizenberg Architecture (KEA) is an architecture firm located in Santa Monica, California established in 1981. The firm is recognized for a range of project types including: adaptive reuse of historic buildings, educational facilities, community places, and housing. Principals Hank Koning, Julie Eizenberg, Brian Lane, and Nathan Bishop work collaboratively with developers, cities and not-for-profit clients. Their work has been published extensively both in the US and abroad, and has earned over 200 awards for design, sustainability and historic preservation.

Koning Eizenberg Architecture's work has been included in academic and popular publications including USA:Modern Architectures in History and A Guide to Contemporary Architecture in America Vol. 1. Koning Eizenberg projects have also been published in magazines including I.D., Metropolitan Home, Architectural Record, Travel + Leisure, Residential Architect, Vanity Fair, Metropolis, and Abitare, as well as in two monographs, Koning Eizenberg Buildings and Architecture isn’t just for special occasions.

== Sustainable architecture ==
In the 1980s, Koning Eizenberg Architecture began using sustainable features in their designs such as passive cooling, healthy building strategies, and sustainable water management techniques. In 1999 Koning Eizenberg designed and built their current studio as a demonstration project in economy and sustainability. Their office is recognized by the architectural community as well as the city of Santa Monica and the state of California for its contribution to environmental responsiveness.

Koning Eizenberg's sustainably oriented projects include LEED projects like the Children's Museum of Pittsburgh, the largest LEED Silver Museum in the United States, and Virginia Avenue Park (Santa Monica, California), the first LEED accredited park to be completed in the US, with a LEED Silver certification.

== Projects ==
=== Century Building and Commuter Bike Center (Pittsburgh, Pennsylvania) ===
Utilizing State Historic Tax Credits the Century building was renovated under the concept of adaptive reuse and completed in 2010. The twelve-story building is now included on the National Register of Historic Places and houses a restaurant, two floors of offices, and 60 units of mixed-income housing (40% affordable) provided in lofts, one bedroom, and two bedroom units. A rooftop garden and club room are available to all residents and tenants. Notable sustainable features include a geothermal energy system and an innovative on-site bike center for use by residents and the public.

=== Children's Museum of Pittsburgh (Pittsburgh, Pennsylvania) ===
The Children's Museum of Pittsburgh and its exhibits were redesigned in 2000 with construction completed in 2005. A new entry and exhibition space over an existing road was built to connect a national register 1890s post office with a 1939 planetarium, highlighting the two historic stone landmarks with a contrasting steel and glass-framed space, wrapped in translucent five-inch hinged plastic flaps that move in the wind and reflect light (designed with Ned Kahn). When completed, the museum was the largest Silver LEED museum in the country, featuring adaptive reuse, recycled materials, and passive shading.

=== Virginia Avenue Park (Santa Monica, California) ===
The expanded and renovated Virginia Avenue Park masterplan had to address the ethnically diverse neighborhood Pico Neighborhood in Santa Monica, California. Renovated warehouses and a refreshed 1960s community building introduce progressive ideas about form while providing spaces for children, teens, families and seniors. Facilities include art rooms, movement spaces, a computer lab as well as fields, basketball courts, play equipment, and an interactive fountain. At the time of its completion in 2005, it was the first park to be certified LEED silver in the country as achieved by onsite water management, adaptive reuse of buildings, daylighting and sustainable materials.

=== Historic Farmers Market (Los Angeles, California) ===
In 1998, plans to build an adjacent shopping center – The Grove – set in motion a complementary master plan for the designated city cultural site of the Los Angeles Farmers Market. Centered on reviving and enhancing the historic property, the plan also facilitated pedestrian traffic between the two developments, while providing surface parking for market patrons. The plan and remodel reorganized services and added large retail spaces while attempting to maintain the utilitarian and authentic personality of the Market at its completion in 2002.

=== The Standard Hotel Downtown LA (Los Angeles, California) ===
The Standard Hotel used state preservation tax credits to convert the original Superior Oil Co. Headquarters. Existing features – such as the exterior, front doors, and lobby – anchor the design. To accommodate guest traffic, the renovation moved the primary entry to the rear, adding an outdoor lounge and dining area. On the upper floors, deep office floorplates necessitated extensive reworking and special configuration of the guest rooms. A rooftop pool and bar were also added by the time work was completed in 2002.

=== AMP Lofts (Los Angeles, California) ===
The AMP lofts were designed as a 180-unit live-work community at 7th and Santa Fe, just south of downtown Los Angeles. Two-story live/work units are located at the street and 5,000 sf of retail is located at the southwest corner to stimulate street activity. The green-screened parking structure acts as a podium for loft units. On the podium, the three-bar organization allows for integral open-air streets, courts, overhead walkways, daylight to below, and cross-ventilation for all higher units.

== Awards ==
- Firm 2023 Architect's Newspaper Best of Practice Award: Medium Firm - West 2021 American Academy of Arts and Letters Architecture Award 2019 Australian Institute of Architects 2019 Gold Medal 2015 #6 in Design, ARCHITECT 50 2012 AIA Los Angeles Gold Medal Award: Hank Koning + Julie Eizenberg 2009 AIA California Council Firm of the Year Award 2007 Forumfest V, Los Angeles Forum for Architecture & Urban Design 2004 Residential Architect Leadership Awards, Firm of the Year
- National 2023 Australian Institute of Architects International Chapter Award: Residential Architecture - Multiple Housing Category: The Park 2022 AIA National Housing Award: Flor 401 Lofts 2021 AIA National Housing Award: The Arroyo 2020 Dezeen Jury Winner for Cultural and Civic Interiors: MuseumLab, Architizer A+ Awards: Special Nominee + Jury Winner: MuseumLab, AIA National Education Facility Design Award: Geffen Academy 2018 AIA | ALA National Library Building Award: Pico Branch Library 2017 Australian Institute of Architects Commendation for Public Architecture: Temple Israel of Hollywood 2016 Faith and Form Award: Temple Israel of Hollywood, Chicago Athenaeum American Architecture Award: Belmar Apartments, Architizer A+ Architecture + Preservation: 28th Street Apartments
- Sustainability 2020 USGBC LEED Homes Award: Affordable Project: The Arroyo 2019 AIA | LA COTE Award: The Arroyo, USGBC-LA Sustainability Innovation Merit Award: The Arroyo 2016 AIA | LA COTE Merit Award: Pico Branch Library 2015 USGBC-LA Project of the Year: Pico Branch Library, USGBC-LA Innovation in Design Honor Award: Pico Branch Library, USGBC-LA Water Efficiency Honor Award: Pico Branch Library 2014 USGBC Sustainable Innovation Award: Belmar Apartments
- Regional 2024 CASH/AIA California Leroy F. Greene Design & Planning Award: SMMUSD Malibu High School 2023 Australian Institute of Architects Victoria Chapter: Victorian Medal: University of Melbourne Student Precinct 2021 AIA California Council Merit Award: Flor 401 Lofts, AIA California Council Merit & LeadingEdge Award: MuseumLab 2017 AIA California Council Honor Award: Temple Israel of Hollywood 2015 AIA California Council Honor Award: See-Through House, AIA California Council Urban Design Award: Belmar Apartments 2014 AIA California Council Honor Award: Belmar Apartments, AIA California Council Merit Award: Pico Branch Library 2013 AIA California Council Merit Award: 28th Street Apartments
- Urban Development and Re-Use 2023 Australian Institute of Architects Victoria Chapter: The Joseph Reed Award for Urban Design: University of Melbourne Student Precinct, Australian Institute of Architects Victoria Chapter: Architecture Award – Creative Adaptation, Heritage Architecture: University of Melbourne Student Precinct 2022 Los Angeles Conservancy Preservation Award: Beverly Laurel Hotel 2017 Westside Urban Forum Public: Institutional Merit Award: Temple Israel of Hollywood 2016 Urban Land Institute Global Award for Excellence: Ocean Avenue South: Belmar Apartments, Urban Land Institute Austin Impact Award for Public Places: The Thinkery 2015 AIA California Council Urban Design Award: Ocean Avenue South: Belmar Apartments 2014 AIA | HUD Secretary's Housing and Community Design Award: 28th Street Apartments
