= Ishihara Park =

Park in Santa Monica, California, United States

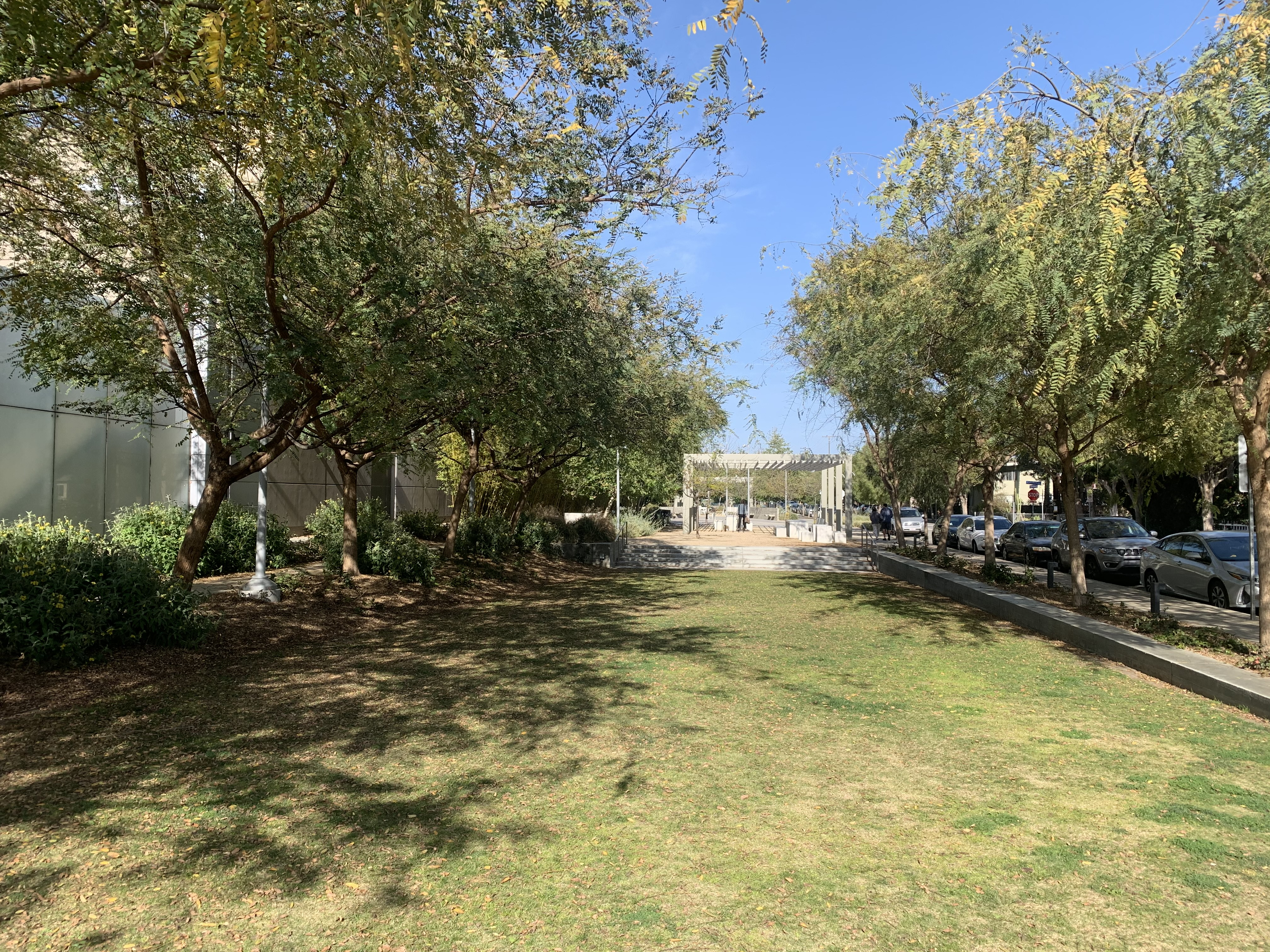
- Interactive map of Ishihara Park
- Location: 2909 Exposition Boulevard
- Nearest city: Santa Monica, California
- Coordinates: 34.0290°N 118.4612°W
- Area: 2.35 acres (0.95 ha)
- Created: 2017
- Operator: Santa Monica Community Services Department

Ishihara Park is a 2.35-acre (0.95 ha) linear community park located in Santa Monica, California. The park was opened to the public in February 2017 and is named after George Ishihara, a local resident who fought in World War II as part of the Japanese-American 442nd Regimental Combat Team and participated in the liberation of the Dachau concentration camp.

== History ==
The location of the park had previously been used as a parking lot and site for utility buildings. In 2010, the Los Angeles Metro approved plans to build a new light rail line connecting Santa Monica to Downtown Los Angeles. In order to do so, Metro needed to establish a maintenance yard between the two locations. Concerned by the increase in noise that a maintenance yard and light rail line might bring to the nearby neighborhoods, Santa Monica and Metro agreed to establish a "buffer zone" between the surrounding residential neighborhood and the maintenance station. Following engagement with the local community, a park was commissioned for the "buffer zone" and, thus, originally named "Buffer Park."

In 2014, members of the local community were invited to propose names for the new park. Several residents suggested that the city rename the proposed park after local resident George Ishihara, a veteran of World War II who had lived most of his life in a house close to the park and had played a significant role in the local community before his death in 2009. The park was designed by Mia Lehrer + Associates and constructed in 2016. Ishihara Park opened to the public on February 25, 2017. Alongside the opening of Ishihara Park, the former Stewart Street Park was renamed Gandara Park after World War II soldier Joe Gandara.

== Facilities ==
The park is broken up into several sections that can be used for different activities. The western end of the park contains outdoor exercise equipment. In the middle of the park, there is a pavilion with outdoor benches and tables along with a playground for young children. At the eastern end of the park is The Learning Garden which provides community members with a place to learn and improve their gardening skills by planting herbs, citrus trees, and other vegetables. A half-mile walking trail traverses each section of the park.
