= Veterans Row =

Veterans Row was a block in Los Angeles where a concentration of United States military veterans who are experiencing homelessness were living in an encampment until it was disbanded in November 2021.

== Background ==
In 2020, Los Angeles County was home to 64,000 people who are experiencing homelessness, 4,000 of them military veterans. In April 2020, at the beginning of the COVID-19 pandemic, the United States Department of Veterans Affairs started a tent-city as an emergency shelter for military veterans who are experiencing homelessness. The camp was located on the grounds of the West Los Angeles VA Medical Center (WLAVA), a medical campus in Brentwood, Los Angeles run by the Department of Veterans Affairs.

== Encampment ==
After a donation of tents by conservative activist group Judicial Watch was rejected by the Department of Veterans Affairs due to the tents being too large, the tents were given directly to veterans who used them to establish Veterans Row on San Vicente Boulevard right outside the VA medical center. Due to a COVID-19 related guidance issued by the Centers for Disease Control, Los Angeles County had suspended encampment cleanups known as "sweeps" that normally forced people to move their tents. The encampment became a focal point for homelessness in Los Angeles and was visited by mayoral candidates, U.S. House Representative Karen Bass, and United States Secretary of Veterans Affairs Denis McDonough.

== Media coverage ==
In 2023 KCRW produced an eight-episode podcast reporting on the encampment titled City of Tents: Veterans Row.
