= Bergamot (arts center) =

Art gallery facility in Santa Monica, California, US

Coordinates: 34°01′40″N 118°27′59″W

- Location: Santa Monica, California
- Address: 2525 Michigan Avenue
- Opened: September 17, 1994
- Developer: Wayne Blank
- Owner: City of Santa Monica
- Num. of stores: 21
- Website: bergamotstation.com

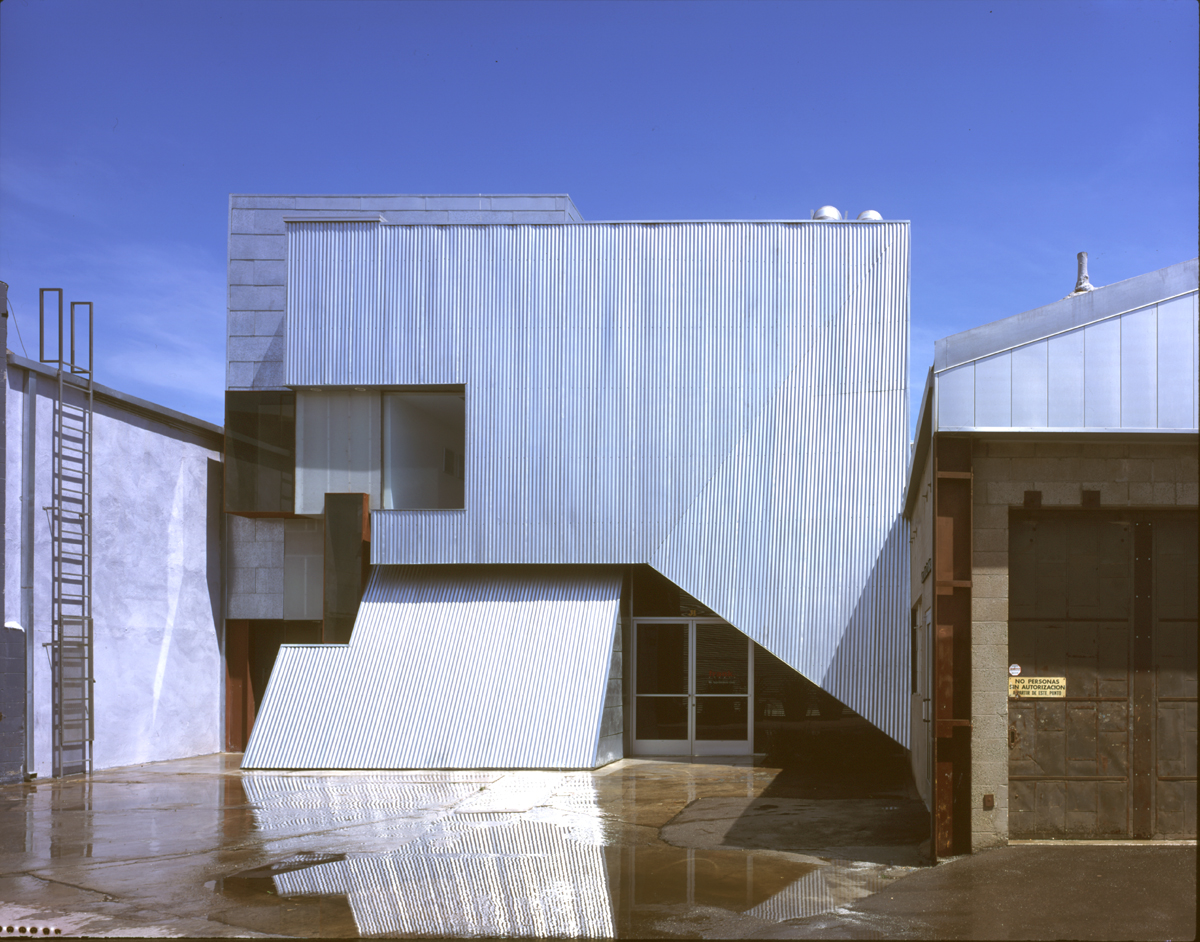
Bergamot, Santa Monica, California

Bergamot Station Arts Center is a Santa Monica facility housing many different private art galleries and appears in most tourist guides as a primary cultural destination. Opened September 17, 1994 as Bergamot Station the campus-like complex is owned by the city of Santa Monica and presently managed by the Worthe Group.

== History ==
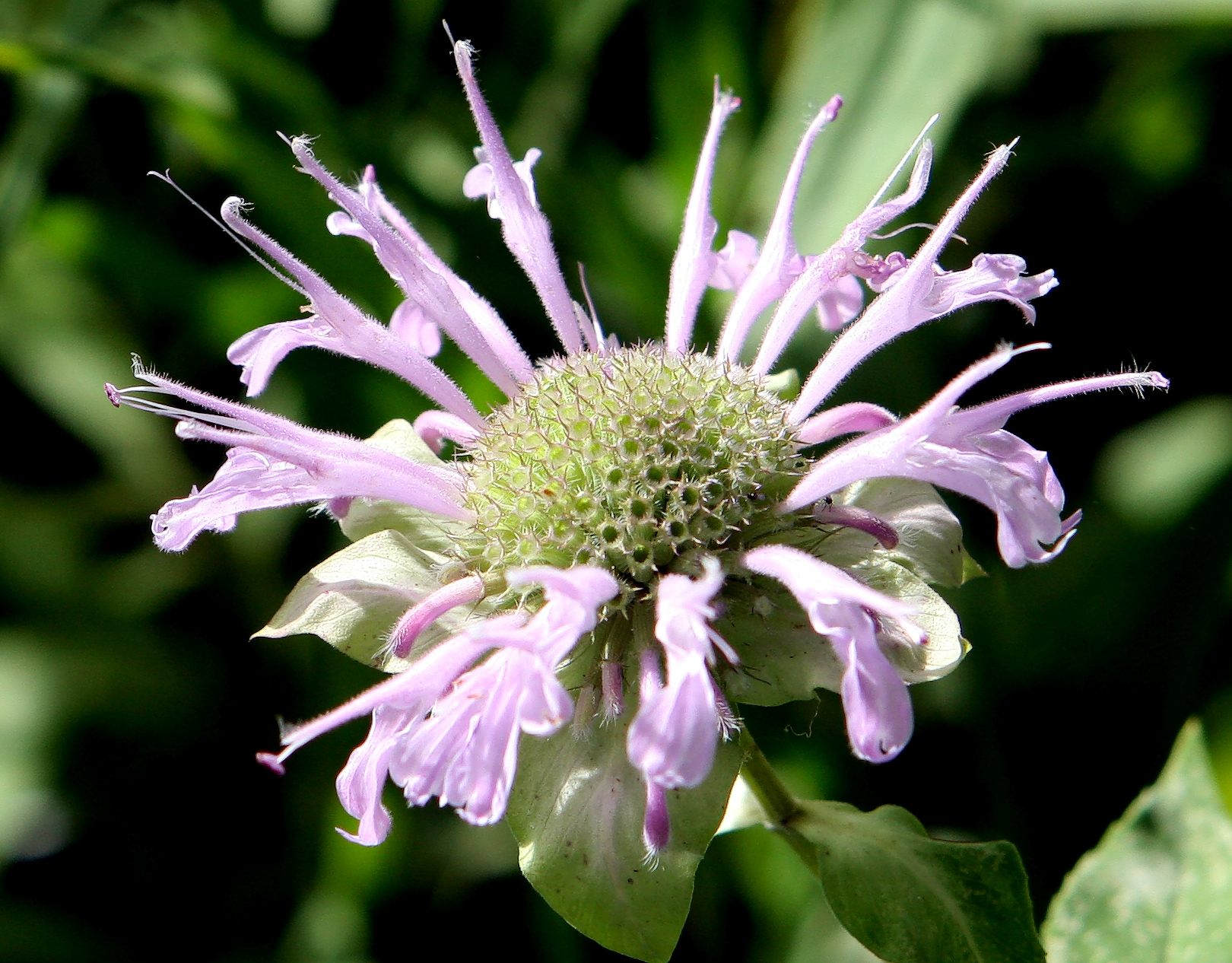
Wild Bergamot still grows in clumps around the art center

From 1875 to 1953, "Bergamot Station" was the site of a stop and rail car storage area first serving the steam-powered Los Angeles and Independence Railroad and later the Santa Monica Air Line. The station was named after Wild Bergamot (Monarda fistulosa), a wildflower native to North America, that once flourished in the area.

After passenger service ceased, the line was used for light freight delivery only. Rail car storage was no longer needed and Southern Pacific Railroad leased the land to various companies for light manufacturing. Warehouse buildings were constructed and housed a celery packing operation, then an ice-making plant, and finally, the manufacturing home base for American Appliance water heaters.

As the rail line fell into disuse and eventual abandonment in the late 1980s, the City of Santa Monica purchased the entire parcel from Southern Pacific Railroad in 1987 to prevent it from being split up and sold. At that time a future light rail service along the right of way was anticipated within 10 years, and the site would be needed as a rail yard and passenger station.

American Appliance moved out in 1993, leaving a sprawling industrial park sitting vacant. Even under the most optimistic scenarios, plans for the light rail were years away. The City, seeking a productive use for the site, approached Wayne Blank, developer and co-owner of the Shoshana Wayne Gallery. Blank's development expertise had already been tapped by the City of Santa Monica for an earlier project: the conversion of a vacant city-owned airport hangar into artists' studios.

Pleased with the airport project's outcome, The City asked Blank to conceive of an artistic use for the site. Blank along with acclaimed architect Lawrence Scarpa of the architecture firm Brooks + Scarpa, created a campus-like complex that retained its industrial and rudimentary look. "Blank's search for a limited partner began and ended with Tom Patchett, an art collector and TV writer who was looking for space to store and possibly exhibit his separate collections of contemporary art and Americana"

The complex has become so popular that the original rail intention has been usurped. When, in 2010, Phase 2 of the Metro Expo Line was approved, adjacent land was purchased to serve the purpose. 26th Street/Bergamot, a stop on the new Expo Line light rail between Los Angeles and Santa Monica, located just north of the entrance of the new arts destination, was opened to the public on May 20, 2016.

Bergamot Station Arts Center is managed by the Worthe Group. Since 2022, the site is managed by Redcar Properties LLC. In 2023, 18 galleries, two restaurants and other business are located in the center.

As of 2026, the city council of Santa Monica has been meeting with developers behind closed doors and negotiating a plan to turn the 5.6 acre site which the Bergamot sits into an affordable housing complex. The land, owned by the City of Santa Monica, would be developed into more than 700 affordable housing units with some councilmembers stating the housing complexes would have gallery space.
