= Joe Gandara =

US Army soldier killed in WWII and Medal of Honor recipient

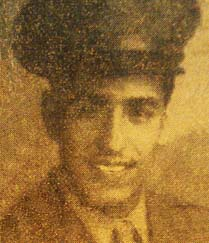
- Born: April 25, 1924; Santa Monica, California
- Died: June 9, 1944 (aged 20); Amfreville, France
- Burial place: Woodlawn Cemetery, Santa Monica, California
- Military career
- Allegiance: United States of America
- Branch: United States Army
- Service years: 1943–1944
- Rank: Private
- Units: 2nd Battalion, 507th Parachute Infantry Regiment, 82nd Airborne Division
- Conflicts: World War II
- Awards: Medal of Honor; Bronze Star Medal; Purple Heart

Joe Gandara (April 25, 1924 – June 9, 1944) was a U.S. Army veteran of World War II and recipient of the Medal of Honor.

Gandara was awarded the Medal of Honor by President Barack Obama in a March 18, 2014 ceremony in the White House. The award came through the Defense Authorization Act which called for a review of Jewish American and Hispanic American veterans from World War II, the Korean War and the Vietnam War to ensure that no prejudice was shown to those deserving the Medal of Honor.

== Biography ==
Gandara, who was the son of Mexican immigrants, joined the Army from Los Angeles in February 1943.

According to Gandara's U.S. Army's biography:

Gandara was born in Santa Monica, California, on April 25, 1924.
Gandara was bestowed the Medal of Honor to recognize his heroic actions on June 9, 1944, in Amfreville, France. His detachment came under devastating enemy fire from a strong German force, pinning the men to the ground for a period of four hours. Gandara advanced voluntarily and alone toward the enemy position and destroyed three hostile machine-guns before he was fatally wounded.
Gandara received the Medal of Honor, Bronze Star Medal, Purple Heart, Army Good Conduct Medal, European-African-Middle Eastern Campaign Medal with one Bronze Service Star and Bronze Arrowhead Device, Presidential Unit Citation, French Fourragere (Couleur à préciser), Combat Infantryman Badge and Parachutist Badge-Basic with one Bronze Service Star.

Gandara's niece Miriam Adams accepts the Medal of Honor on his behalf during a White House ceremony on March 18, 2014.

== Medal of Honor citation ==
Private Joe Gandara distinguished himself by acts of gallantry and intrepidity above and beyond the call of duty while serving with Company D, 2d Battalion, 507th Parachute Infantry Regiment, 82nd Airborne Division during combat operations against an armed enemy in Amfreville, France on June 9, 1944. On that day, Private Gandara’s detachment came under devastating enemy fire from a strong German force, pinning the men to the ground for a period of four hours. Private Gandara voluntarily advanced alone toward the enemy position. Firing his machinegun from his hip as he moved forward, he destroyed three hostile machineguns before he was fatally wounded. Private Gandara’s extraordinary heroism and selflessness at the cost of his own life, above and beyond the call of duty, are in keeping with the highest traditions of military service and reflect great credit upon himself, his unit and the United States Army.

== Awards and decorations ==

Badge	Combat Infantryman Badge		
1st row	Medal of Honor		
2nd row	Bronze Star Medal	Purple Heart	Army Good Conduct Medal
3rd row	American Campaign Medal	European–African–Middle Eastern Campaign Medal with 1 campaign star and arrowhead device	World War II Victory Medal
Badge	Parachutist Badge-Basic with one Bronze Service Star.		

== Legacy ==
Stewart Street Park, a 3.8 acre residential park located in Santa Monica, California, was renamed Gandara Park in his honor in 2017.
