= Olympic Boulevard (Los Angeles) =

Major arterial road in Los Angeles, California

Coordinates: 34.0451°N 118.2650°W

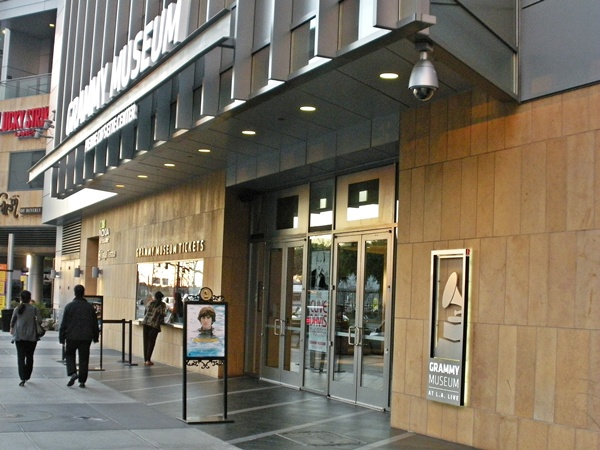
The entrance of the Grammy Museum at L.A. Live

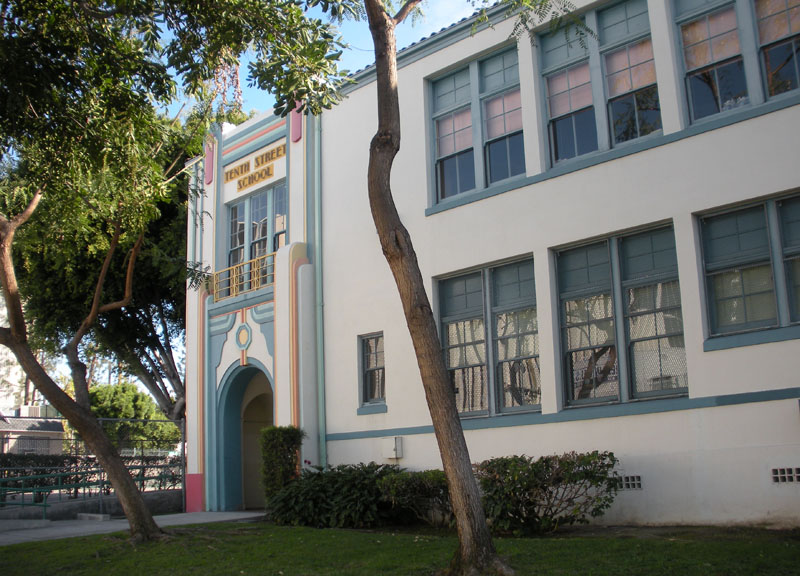
Tenth Street School is located on Olympic Boulevard.

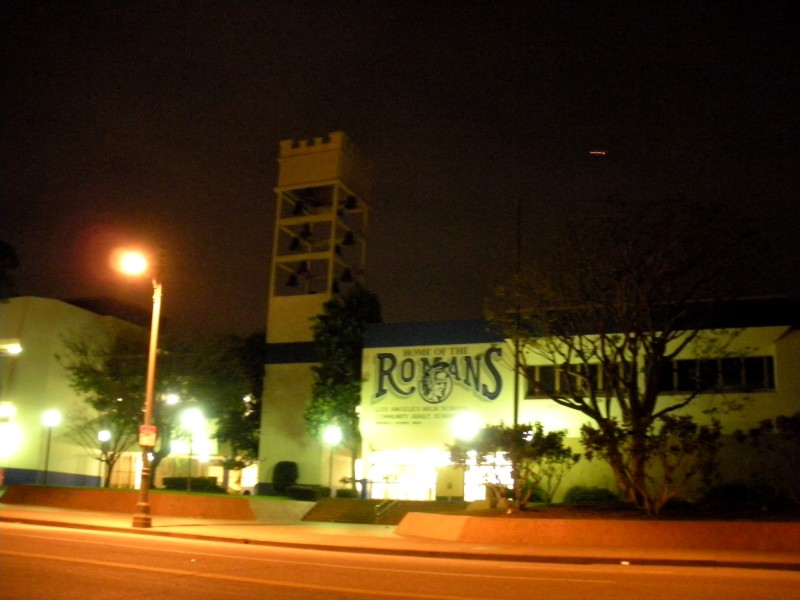
Los Angeles High School at night

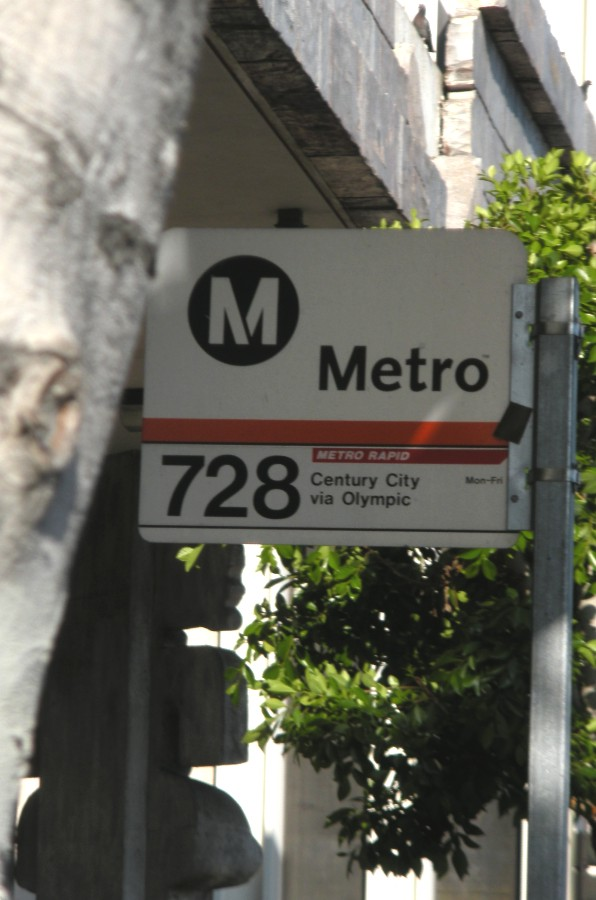
A Metro bus stop sign on Olympic Blvd. The 728 rapid line has since been discontinued, but the 28 line remains.

Olympic Boulevard, formerly 10th Street, is a major arterial road in Los Angeles County, California. It stretches from Ocean Avenue at the western end of Santa Monica to East Los Angeles. It runs north of Pico Boulevard and south of Wilshire and Santa Monica boulevards from Santa Monica to downtown Los Angeles.

== Route description ==
Like other major Los Angeles streets, Olympic is at least four lanes in width. Unlike other east-west arterial roads such as Wilshire Boulevard, Santa Monica Boulevard, and Sunset Boulevard, it does not cross major attractions and sites and therefore contains far less traffic. While Wilshire crosses through the heart of Los Angeles, Olympic runs through the southern end of principal areas such as West Los Angeles, Westwood, Century City, Beverly Hills, Hancock Park, Koreatown, Westlake and Downtown Los Angeles. Little Ethiopia is east of Fairfax Avenue and Olympic. Proceeding east on Olympic, it breaks off in Downtown LA's Fashion District but continues on from there, passing the southern areas of Boyle Heights, East Los Angeles, Commerce, and Montebello with an eastern terminus in Pico Rivera as a small neighborhood street.

Olympic Boulevard is primarily a commercial, urban street. There is a grass divider with trees in the Santa Monica portion. Around Carthay, Olympic passes through residential neighborhoods. A number of schools are located on Olympic as well. Crossroads School is located at Olympic and 20th in Santa Monica, New Roads Middle School is located at the Franklin/Berkeley St. area in Santa Monica. and Wildwood School is located in between Bundy and Barrington. Los Angeles High School is located slightly to the east of Olympic and Highland Avenue.

Olympic expands to six lanes starting east of Santa Monica and generally maintains a speed limit of 45 miles per hour (72 km/h). Even so, due to Los Angeles traffic, Olympic often becomes congested.

It was originally named 10th Street, but was renamed Olympic Boulevard for the 1932 Summer Olympics, as that was the occasion of the tenth modern event. Tenth Street School, at Olympic and Grattan, was founded in 1888 and has kept the original name. Parts of the old 10th Street exist as smaller streets near Hancock Park, in Westlake, and in the Central City East area southeast of Downtown.

== Transportation ==
Bus service throughout Olympic Boulevard is served between Santa Monica and Century City by Santa Monica Transit line 5, between Century City and Downtown LA by Metro Local line 28, and from The Fashion District east by Metro Local lines 62 and 66.

There are two rail stations on the Metro E Line that stop on or near Olympic Boulevard: one on 26th Street in Santa Monica outside the Bergamot Station and another slightly south of Olympic Boulevard at Bundy Drive.

== Notable landmarks ==
- Federal Reserve Bank of San Francisco, Los Angeles Branch
- The Grammy Museum
- LA Live
- Loyola Law School
- Sammy Lee Square, at the corner of Normandie Avenue
- Los Angeles High School
- National Academy of Recording Arts and Sciences headquarters

== See also ==
- Byron B. Brainard – American politician
