= Gandara Park =

Park in Santa Monica, California, United States

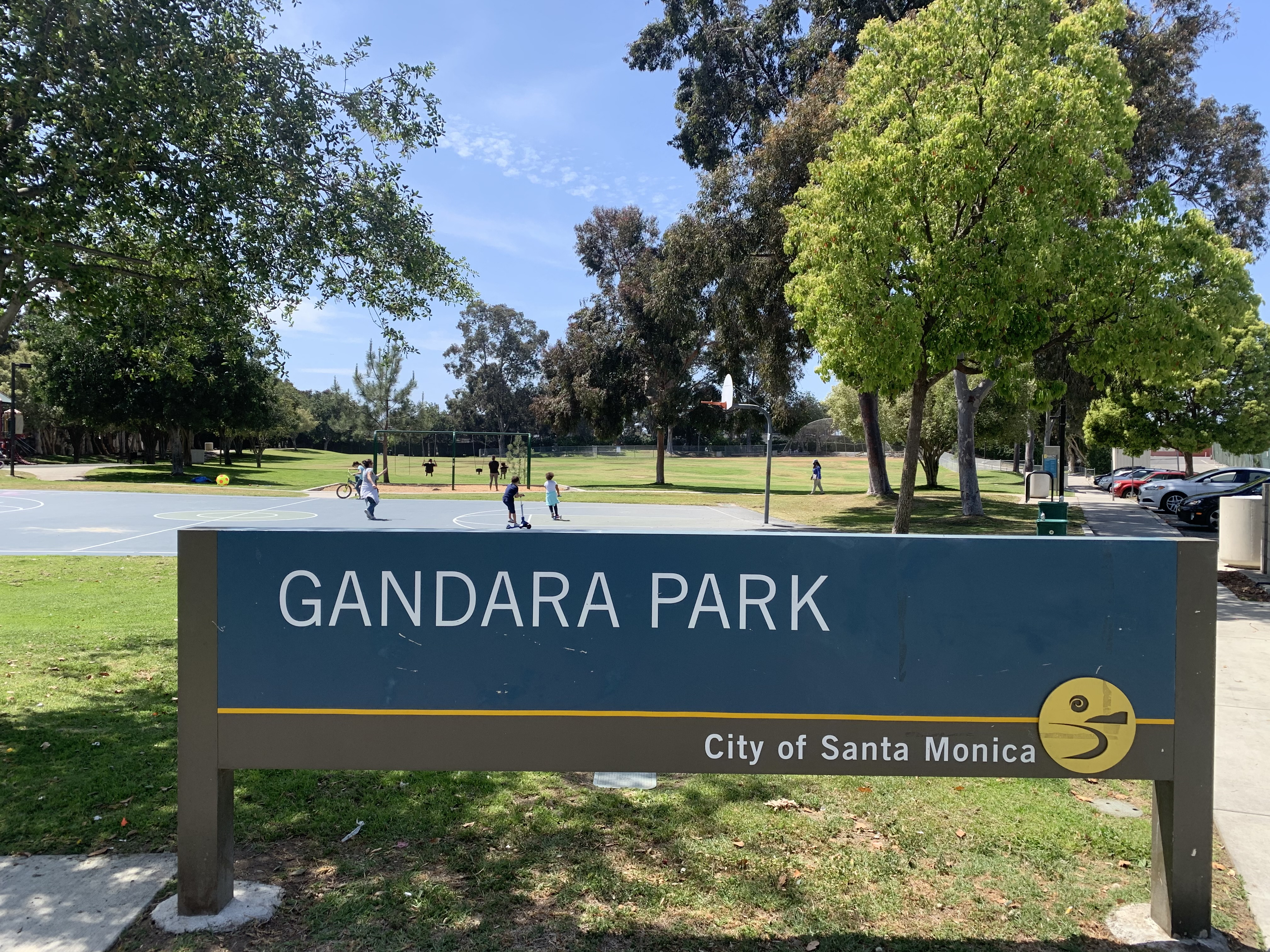
- Interactive map of Gandara Park
- Location: 1819 Stewart Street
- Nearest city: Santa Monica, California, US
- Coordinates: 34°01′39″N 118°27′54″W
- Area: 3.8 acres (1.5 ha)
- Created: 1975
- Operator: Santa Monica Community Services Department

Gandara Park is a 3.8 acre residential park located in Santa Monica, California, United States. Originally named Stewart Street Park, in 2016 the park was renamed to honor Joe Gandara, a local resident who was posthumously awarded the Medal of Honor by President Barack Obama for his actions during World War II.

== History ==
Prior to the park's creation, the land was used as a clay mine. After the clay mine was abandoned, the City of Santa Monica elected to use the space as a landfill for construction debris.

In 1975, the landfill was converted to a park for nearby residents. From 1975 to 2016, the park was named Stewart Street Park after the street that abuts the park. Stewart Street, in turn, was named after either William Morris Stewart, a U.S. senator with substantial business ties to the silver industry in California, or Edwin Stewart, a local businessman and politician.

In 2014, the City asked for resident input regarding the name for a nearby park (Ishihara Park) and also received comments regarding renaming Stewart Street. Among other names, local residents proposed that Stewart Street Park be renamed to honor Private Joe Gandara, a local resident who had died during World War II. President Barack Obama had recently awarded Gandara the Medal of Honor posthumously as Gandara's contributions had previously been overlooked due to his Hispanic heritage. The proposal to rename the park was approved in 2016 and the park was officially renamed in February 2017, alongside the opening of Ishihara Park.

== Facilities ==
In addition to a broad, sloping field, Gandara Park includes a playground, basketball court, youth baseball field, and a concession stand that is used for storage.

During many summers, Gandara Park hosts "Jazz on the Lawn", a collection of musical acts and food offerings.
