= Virginia Avenue Park =

Park in Santa Monica, California, United States

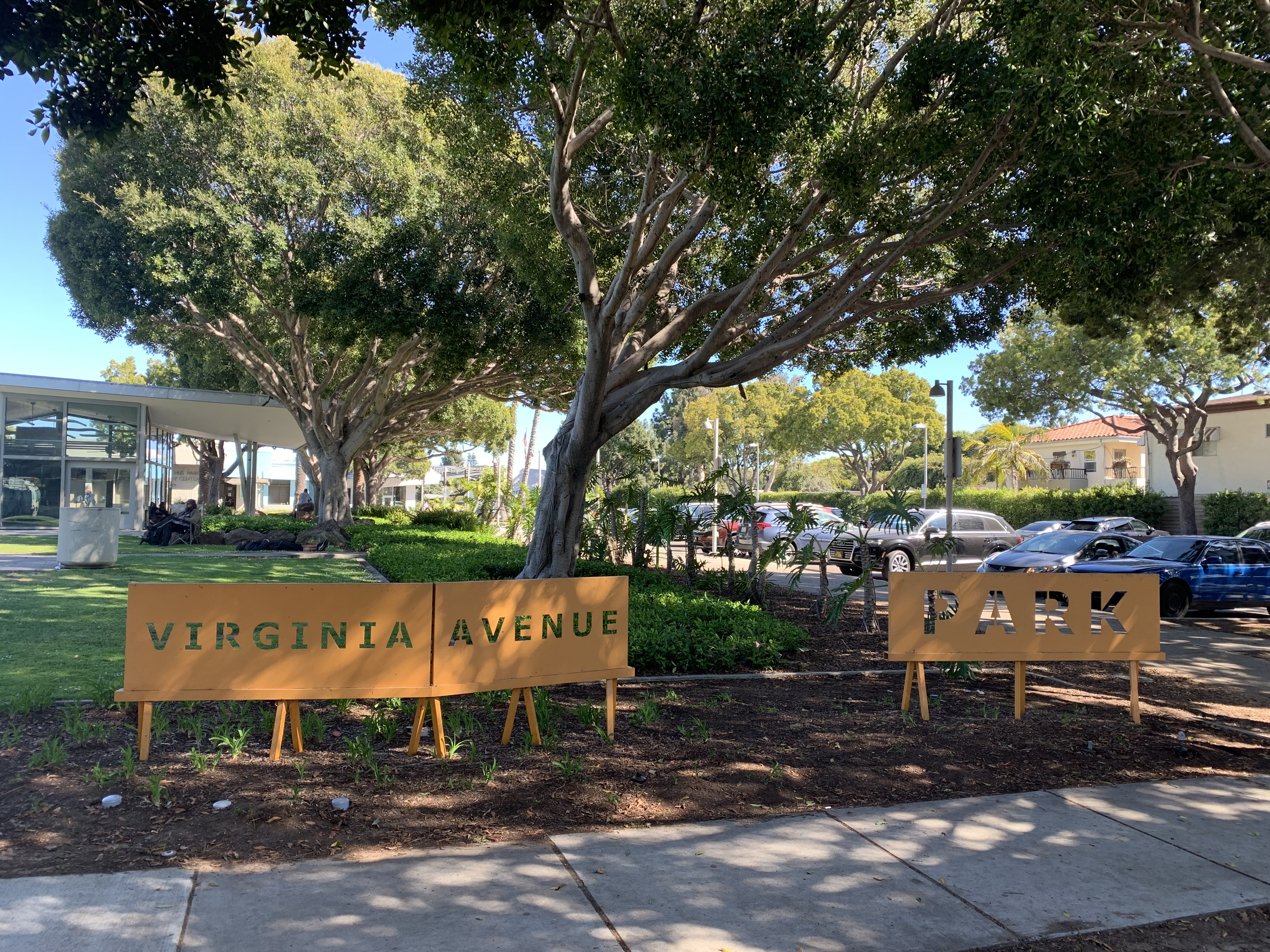
- Looking South towards the park from Virginia Avenue.
- Interactive map of Virginia Avenue Park
- Location: 2200 Virginia Avenue
- Nearest city: Santa Monica, California
- Coordinates: 34°01′17″N 118°28′04″W
- Area: 9.5 acres (3.8 ha)
- Created: 1976 (original opening); 2005 (redevelopment)
- Designer: Koning Eizenberg Architecture (2005 redevelopment)
- Operator: Santa Monica Community Services Department

Virginia Avenue Park is a 9.5 acres (3.8 ha) park located in the Pico neighborhood of Santa Monica, California. Originally opened in 1976, the park was redeveloped and expanded in the 1990s and early 2000s, reopening in 2005. The park hosts a number of community activities such as a weekly farmers market, afterschool programs, and social program assistance. The park is also home to the Pico Branch Library and the Thelma Terry community center.

== History ==
The original 6.3 acres (2.5 ha) park was purchased by the City of Santa Monica in 1975 and opened in 1976. In 1980, the city opened the Thelma Terry community center.

In the early-1990s, the city began planning to redevelop the park. The redevelopment process was delayed however by the city's decision to purchase an additional 3.2 acres (1.3 ha) lot adjacent to the park. By 1999, the city had selected Koning Eizenberg Architecture to lead the redevelopment effort and approved a $13 million budget for the project. The redevelopment was completed in 2005. Notably, following redevelopment, the Park was the first park in the United States to achieve LEED Silver certification.

In 2014, the park became the new site of the Pico Branch Library, one of the most popular library branches in Santa Monica.

== Facilities & events ==
The park hosts a wide array of facilities including:

- The Thelma Terry community center
- The Teen Center
- The Patio
- The Splash Pad
- The Pico Branch Library
- Basketball courts
- Playgrounds

The park also hosts a number of community events such as a weekly farmers market, afterschool programs, and social program assistance. In recent years, the park has also played host to community events marking Juneteenth and Dia de los Muertos.

== Awards ==
Following redevelopment, the park received several awards, including:

- 2007 LA Business Council Architectural Award, Landscape Architecture
- 2007 Westside Prize Urban Solutions/Built, Westside Urban Forum
- 2006 Municipal Award of Merit, US Green Building Council
