= List of public art in Santa Monica, California =

This is a list of public artworks in Santa Monica, California in the United States. This list contains only 28 artworks, does not list any artworks installed after 2010, and incorrectly includes private works of art.

Title	Image	Artist	Year	Location	Coordinates	Material	Dimensions	Owner
Another Magical Sunset at Santa Monica Beach		Gilbert Luján	1987	Parking garage 3	34°1′1.66″N 118°29′46.35″W			City of Santa Monica
Arcadia Bandini de Baker		Masahito Sanae	1986	Palisades Park		Bronze	Approx. 3 ft. x 2 ft. x 1 ft. 2 in.	City of Santa Monica
Apollo Fountain		Julia Bracken Wendt	1924	Rustic Canyon Recreation Center	34°2′16.43″N 118°30′53.47″W	Bronze	Approx. 28 1/2 x 26 x 17 in.	City of Los Angeles
The Big Wave		Tony DeLap	1983-1990	Wilshire Blvd. at Franklin St.	34°2′25.3″N 118°28′19.84″W	Steel, paint, optical fiber	Approx. 45 x 80 x 9 ft.	City of Santa Monica
Children's Mural		Daniel Alonzo	1978	Marine Park Center	34°0′21.63″N 118°27′54.52″W			
Chain Reaction		Paul Conrad	1991	Santa Monica Civic Center	34°0′35.16″N 118°29′24.35″W	Copper chain link and stainless steel	Approx. H. 13 ft. x Diam. 26 ft.	City of Santa Monica
Comedy and Tragedy: Muses		Olinka Hrdy	1937	Barnum Hall	34°0′43.19″N 118°29′11.52″W	Painted concrete		Santa Monica High School
Cradle		Ball Nogues Studio	2010	Parking Garage 7		Stainless steel	H 36 ft. x W 39 ft.	City of Santa Monica
Douglas Park Picnic Tables		Allen and Ellen Wexler	2001	Douglas Park, 2349 Wilshire Boulevard	34°2′8.03″N 118°28′45.23″W	Picnic table, benches		City of Santa Monica
Emergence		Ruth C. Snyder	1990	2200 Main St.	34°0′19.91″N 118°29′14.74″W	Bronze	Approx. H. 14 ft. x Diam. 12 in.	Private collection
Fountain Family Group		Richard H. Ellis	1969	2600 Wilshire Blvd.	34°2′9.57″N 118°28′37.84″W	Bronze	Approx. H. 6 ft.	Relocated to Hilbert Museum of California Art in 2019
Garage Your Desires		Peter Shire	2003	Parking structure #9, 1136 Fourth Street				City of Santa Monica
Gestation III		Baile Oakes	1990	Palisades Park		Wood	Approx. 10 ft. 7 in. x 11 ft. 8 in. x 8 ft. 6 in.	City of Santa Monica
History of the Pico Neighborhood		Ann Elizabeth Thiermann	1983	Stewart Street at Virginia Avenue				City of Santa Monica
(Interlocking Sculpture)		Eino		Private residence		Colorado marble	Approx. 32 x 36 x 18 in.	
Intersection		Helen Mayer Harrison and Newton Harrison	1993	Shutters on the Beach Hotel	34°0′23.8″N 118°29′30.01″W	Concrete, plants and sand		City of Santa Monica
Irene Dunne		Artis Lane		St. John's Health Center		Bronze	Approx. 2 x 1 1/2 x 1 1/2 ft.	St. John's Hospital and Health Center Foundation
Ocean Park Historical Postcards		Art Mortimer	1980	Joslyn Park, Kensington Street at Beverly Avenue				
Ocean Park Segue		Joyce Kohl	1988	Ocean Park Beach			Concrete	
Oneness		Eino	ca. 1964-1966	Mary Hotchkiss Park	34°0′21.03″N 118°29′3.34″W	Italian Golden Panaccio marble	8 x 3 x 3 ft.	
Totem Pole		Unknown	1925	Palisades Park		Painted wood	Approx. H. 17 1/2 ft. x W. 2 ft.	City of Santa Monica
Santa Monica		Eugene Morahan	1934	Palisades Park		White cement coated with a white silicate sand washed with acid	Approx. H. 10 ft.	
Santa Monica: Walk on L.A.		Carl Cheng	1988	Santa Monica State Beach		Cast concrete and steel	Approx. W. 12 ft. x Diam. 9 ft.	City of Santa Monica
Unbridled		David Gordon	1985	Ocean Park Boulevard at Fourth Street	34°0′13.58″N 118°28′53.46″W			City of Santa Monica
Untitled		Eric Orr	1989 or 1990	11900 Olympic	34°1′56.7″N 118°27′8.72″W	Black Andes granite	Each slab: approx. 12 ft. x 36 in. x 8 in.	
Untitled (Homage to Jack Kerouac)		Mauro Staccioli	1990	Pico Boulevard, Neilson Way & Ocean Ave.	34°0′25.57″N 118°29′24.47″W	Painted concrete and wood	2 pieces. Each: approx. 10 x 25 x 2 ft.	City of Santa Monica
Wave and Shell Obelisks		Michele Oka Doner	1992	Beach boardwalk, Ocean Park Boulevard at Barnard Way	34°0′3.08″N 118°29′9.6″W	Accreted minerals from seawater over copper	2 obelisks. Each: approx. H. 13 ft. 6 in. x Diam. 9 in.	City of Santa Monica
Whale of a Mural		Daniel Alonzo	1983	Ocean Park Boulevard at Fourth Street	34°0′13.58″N 118°28′53.46″W			City of Santa Monica
In the image		Ed Massey	2019	Wishire Boulevard 26th		Concrete	7 ft	Private Collection
