= Spaceship Earth (disambiguation) =

Spaceship Earth is a worldview of concern over limited resource use on Earth. It may also refer to:

- Spaceship Earth (detector), a network of neutron monitors designed to measure the flux of cosmic rays arriving at Earth from different directions
- Spaceship Earth (Epcot), an attraction at the Epcot theme park in Walt Disney World Resort, Florida, USA
- Spaceship Earth (film), a 2020 documentary about Biosphere 2
- Spaceship Earth (sculpture), at Kennesaw State University, Kennesaw, Georgia, USA
- Spaceship Earth, a 1966 book by Barbara Ward
