= Santa Monica (sculpture) =

Statue in Santa Monica, California, U.S.

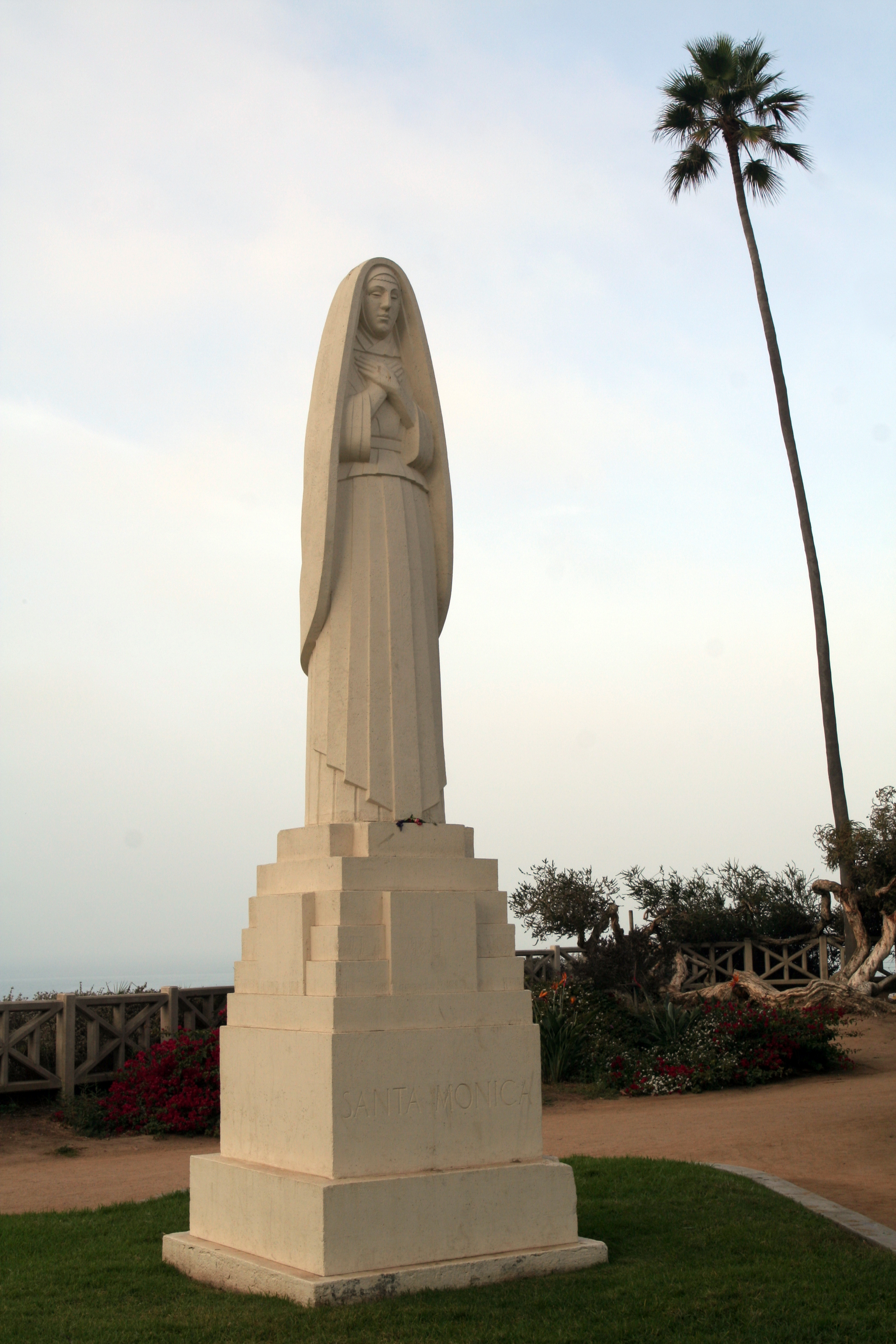
- The sculpture in 2006
- Artist: Eugene Morahan
- Completion date: 1935
- Location: Santa Monica, California, U.S.
- 34°01′00″N 118°30′05″W

Santa Monica (also known as Saint Monica) is an Art Deco sculpture by Eugene Morahan (1869–1949) installed in Santa Monica's Palisades Park, overlooking the Pacific Ocean in California.

== Description ==
The cast-cement sculpture of Saint Monica of Hippo is approximately 10 ft (3.0 m) tall and rests on a concrete base that is approximately 6 ft (1.8 m) tall. (Father Juan Crespí visited the nearby Tongva Sacred Springs on an expedition in 1769; the scattered pools of flowing water reminded him of Monica’s tears for her son Augustine, of later Confessions fame. The pre-statehood Rancho Boca de Santa Monica and Rancho San Vicente y Santa Monica, and eventually the city, all took the name of the Roman Catholic Saint.)

== History ==
The sculpture is a New Deal artwork funded by the early Public Works of Art Project. The California regional director who commissioned Saint Monica was Merle Armitage. The city of Santa Monica paid for the materials; southern California under Armitage’s leadership was unusually successful compared to other regions in raising money for public artwork cooperatively funded with the PWAP.

The work was dedicated on May 4, 1935. The dedication ceremony was set for a “Pioneer Days” event and attended by government dignitaries and community leaders, with music provided by the Santa Monica Municipal Band. Mount Rushmore sculptor Gutzon Borglum had even come to Santa Monica to help his friend Morahan finish the piece before the unveiling ceremony.

The statue was used as the cover image of W. W. Robinson’s 1950 history of Santa Monica.

The work was surveyed by the Smithsonian Institution's Save Outdoor Sculpture! program in 1994.

He climbed into his Mustang and blasted down Wilshire, past the two- and three-story shops and bars and restaurants of Santa Monica, all the way to the end of the road, where Eugene Morahan’s white Art Deco statue of the city’s namesake saint stood, surrounded by gnarled trees and a patch of grass shaped like a heart.

— Anthony Zuiker, Dark Prophecy

== See also ==
- List of New Deal sculpture
- List of public art in Santa Monica, California
