= Bust of Arcadia Bandini de Baker =

Bronze statue in Santa Monica, California, U.S.

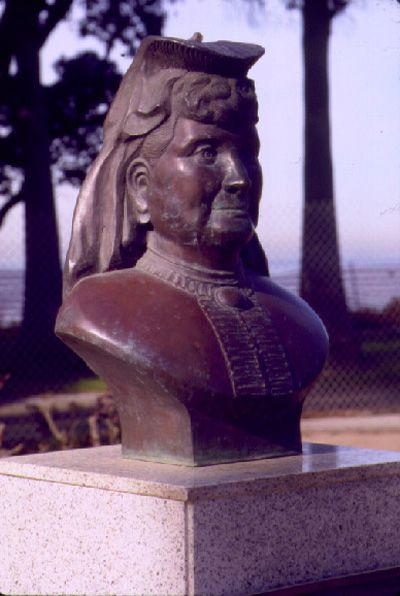
- Year: 1987
- Medium: Bronze
- Subject: Arcadia Bandini de Stearns Baker
- Location: Palisades Park, Santa Monica, California; 34.022794°N 118.508897°W

The Bust of Arcadia Bandini de Baker is a bronze monument in Palisades Park, in Santa Monica, California, honoring Arcadia Bandini de Stearns Baker, a Californio benefactress and co-founder of Santa Monica.

== History ==
The bust was erected in 1987, honoring Arcadia Bandini de Baker's contributions to the community which earned her the nickname of "Godmother of Santa Monica", as well as her vast land donations to Santa Monica, including the land that now forms Palisades Park, originally named "Linda Vista Park" by Bandini.

The bust was sculpted by artist Masahito Sanae and dedicated on October 18, 1987, with support from the City of Santa Monica, the Santa Monica Historical Society, and members of the Bandini family.
