= Weldon J. Fulton =

American architect

Weldon J. Fulton (1911-1998) was an American architect who designed many buildings in Santa Monica, California, including the city's Camera Obscura overlooking the Pacific Ocean. Fulton won design awards in 1970 for the community center in Inglewood, California and a fire station in Santa Monica.

Fulton was born December 24, 1911, in Los Angeles. He married Eleanor Fulton in 1960 in Palos Verdes, California.

He died on December 14, 1998, in Palm Springs. He was survived by daughters Darlene Emml and Diane Ross and a son, Weldon J.
