= Perpetua of Hippo =

Roman abbess

Perpetua (died c. 423) was a late Roman abbess, the daughter of Saint Monica and Patricius, and the younger sister of Augustine of Hippo.

== Biography ==
Although Augustine's sister is mentioned by him and Possidius, neither give her name; the Bollandists ascribe the name Perpetua to sacred tradition. Perpetua married and was widowed, then dedicated herself to a life of celibacy and became head of a convent. She died around 423. In his writings, Augustine does name their brother, Navigus. Possidius describes her in his Vita Augustini as "superior of the handmaids until her death", despite this, neither she, nor any other woman, was allowed to stay at Augustine's monastery. He argued that although his sister, who was living a holy life, would be above "evil suspicion" - she would need to bring in female servants who may provide temptation.

== Religious impact ==
Perpetua was an abbess of a community of consecrated virgins in Hippo, This monastery was probably close to his own in Hippo, probably in behalf of Augustine.

Augustine and Perpetua's nieces joined this religious foundation. The monastery was also well known for rescuing foundlings. This establishment seems to have run on similar lines to his - the nuns were allowed to leave the monastery for a variety of activities, including: visiting the baths, to the laundry, and to worship at external churches. He wrote Epistula 211 addressed to the order, after the death of his sister, as they were suffering from internal dissent. It can be argued that Perpetua's influence was at its strongest after her death, with the writing of this letter to her community. It became known as the Rule of Nuns. One of its major warnings was of pride: whether you came from a humble or a rich background, there was danger that you may become proud of your asceticism, which undid all its holy work.

== See also ==
- List of early Christian saints
