= Santa Monica Camera Obscura =

Attraction in California, U.S.

Coordinates: 34°00′46″N 118°29′49″W

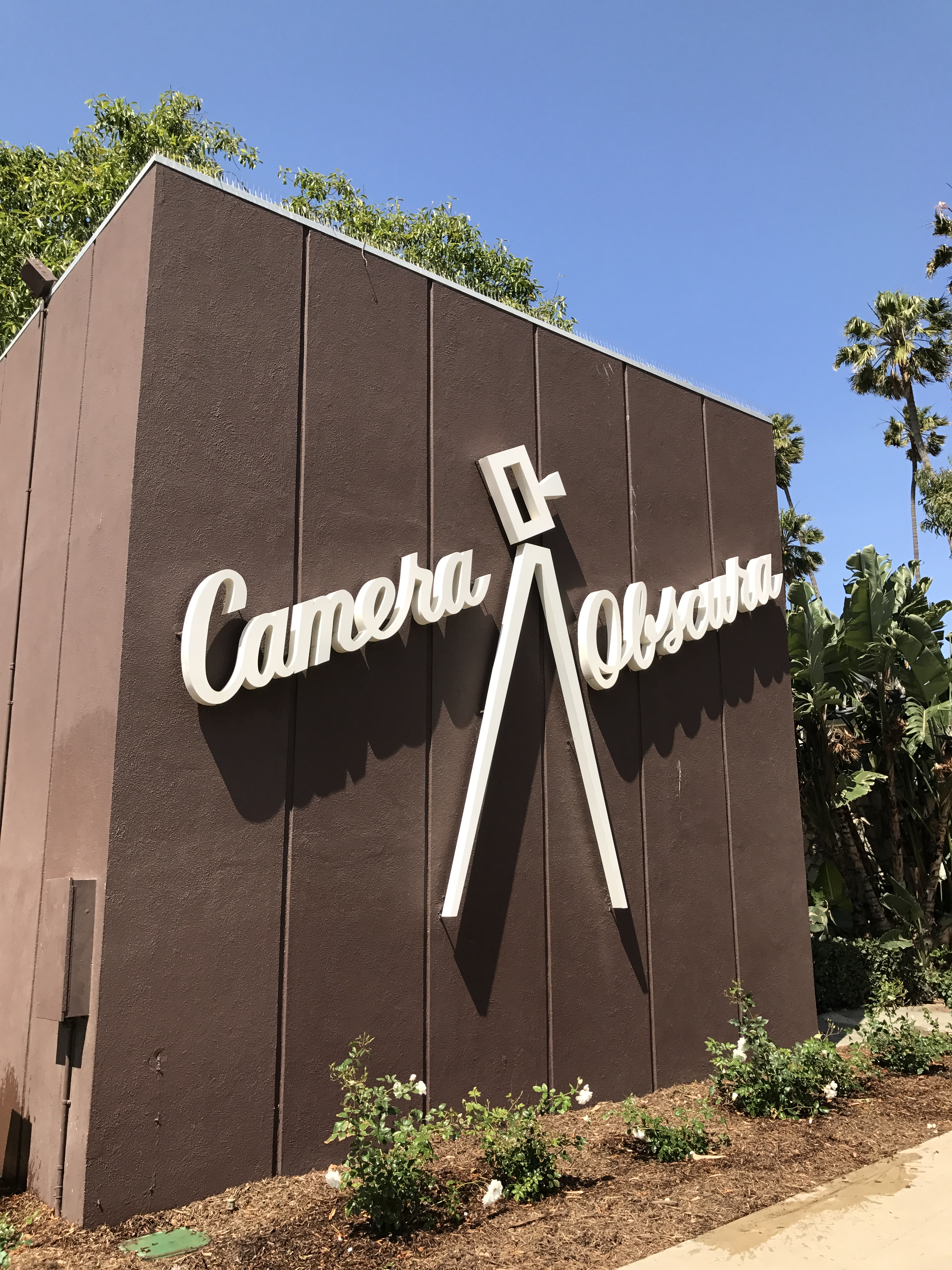
The camera obscura has been housed in this building since 1955.

The Santa Monica Camera Obscura is a publicly accessible historical camera obscura, located in Palisades Park overlooking the Pacific Ocean, in Santa Monica, California.

The Santa Monica Camera Obscura was installed (and perhaps constructed) by Santa Monica mayor Robert F. Jones on April 21, 1899. Jones was the nephew of Santa Monica cofounder and U.S. Senator from Nevada John P. Jones. The camera obscura was one of the attractions on the Balloon Route streetcar tour of Los Angeles.

The camera obscura was originally located at the North Beach Bath House, and was moved up to Palisades Park (then Linda Vista Park) in the early 1900s. The camera obscura has been in the current building, designed by Weldon J. Fulton, since November 1955. The adjoining space was once used as a senior center, and is now a community art center. Access to the Camera Obscura is free and open to the public during the art center's regular operating hours, however the building has been closed to the public since 2020, when it was temporarily closed due to the COVID-19 pandemic.

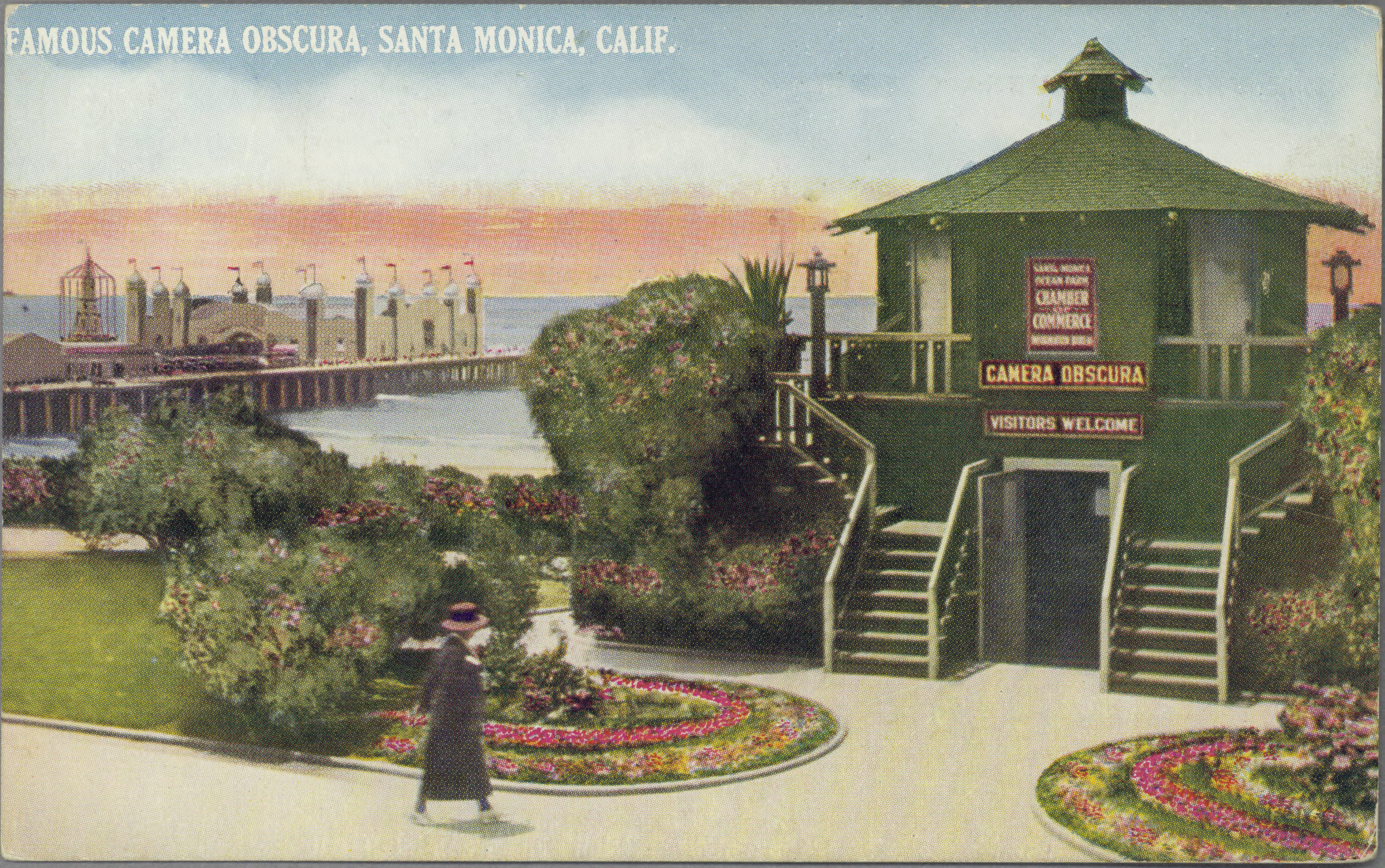
Postcard view c. 1910
