= Saint Monica =

Christian saint (died 387)

Saint Monica of Hippo
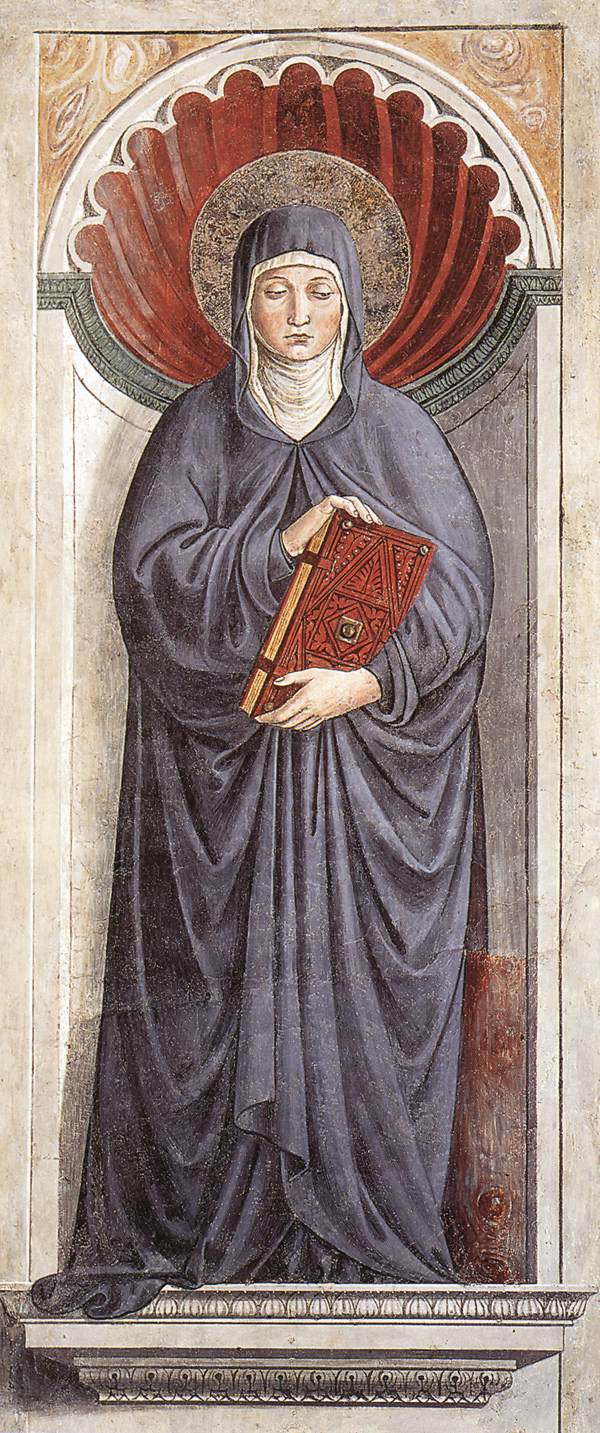
- Saint Monica by Benozzo Gozzoli, 1464–65
- Born: c. 332; Thagaste, Numidia Cirtensis, Western Roman Empire (present-day Souk Ahras, Algeria)
- Died: 387; Ostia, Italia, Western Roman Empire (near present-day Ostia)
- Venerated in: Catholic Church; Anglican Communion; Eastern Orthodox Church; Lutheranism; Oriental Orthodox Churches
- Canonized: Pre-Congregation
- Major shrine: Basilica of Sant'Agostino, Rome, Italy
- Feast: 27 August (Latin Church, Church of England, Lutheran Church–Missouri Synod); 4 May (pre-1969 General Roman Calendar, Eastern Orthodox Church, Eastern Catholic Churches, Evangelical Lutheran Church in America, Episcopal Church in the United States of America)
- Patronage: Married women; difficult marriages; disappointing children; victims of adultery or unfaithfulness; victims of (verbal) abuse; and conversion of relatives; alcoholics; Berbers, lapsed Catholics; and many places: Manaoag, Pangasinan, Philippines; Don Galo, Parañaque, Philippines; Santa Monica, California, United States; Saint Monica University, Buea, Cameroon; Pinamungajan, Cebu, Philippines; St. Monique Valais, Binangonan, Rizal; Santa Monica Parish Church (Angat), Bulacan; Mexico, Pampanga; Minalin, Pampanga; Sta. Monica Parish Church, Pavia, Iloilo; Sta. Monica Parish Church, Hamtic, Antique; Sta. Monica Parish Church, Panay, Capiz; Sta. Monica Parish Church, Alburquerque, Bohol; Barangay Julugan, Tanza, Cavite

Monica of Hippo (c. 332 – 387), also written as "Monnica", was an early North African Christian saint and the mother of Saint Augustine. She is remembered and honored in the Catholic and Orthodox Churches, albeit on different feast days, for her outstanding Christian virtues, particularly the suffering caused by her husband's adultery, and her prayerful life dedicated to the reformation of her son, who wrote extensively of her pious acts and life with her in his Confessions. Popular Christian legends recall Monica weeping every night for her son Augustine.

== Life ==
Monica is most likely to have been born in Thagaste (present-day Souk Ahras, Algeria). She is believed to have been a Berber on the basis of her name. She was married early in life to Patricius, a decurion pagan, in Thagaste. Patricius reportedly had a violent temper and appears to have been of dissolute habits; apparently his mother exhibited similar behaviours. Monica's almsgiving, deeds and prayer habits annoyed Patricius, but it is said that he always held her in respect.

Monica had three children who survived infancy: two sons, Augustine and Navigius, and a daughter, 'Perpetua' of Hippo. Unable to secure baptism for them, she grieved heavily when Augustine fell ill. In her distress she asked Patricius to allow Augustine to be baptized; he agreed, then withdrew this consent when the boy recovered.

Monica's relief at Augustine's recovery turned to anxiety as he misspent his renewed life being wayward, later describing himself as having been lazy. He was finally sent to school at Madauros. He was 17 and studying rhetoric in Carthage when Patricius died.

Augustine had become a Manichaean at Carthage. When, upon his return home, he shared his views regarding Manichaeism, Monica drove him away from her table. However, she is also said to have experienced a vision that convinced her to reconcile with him.

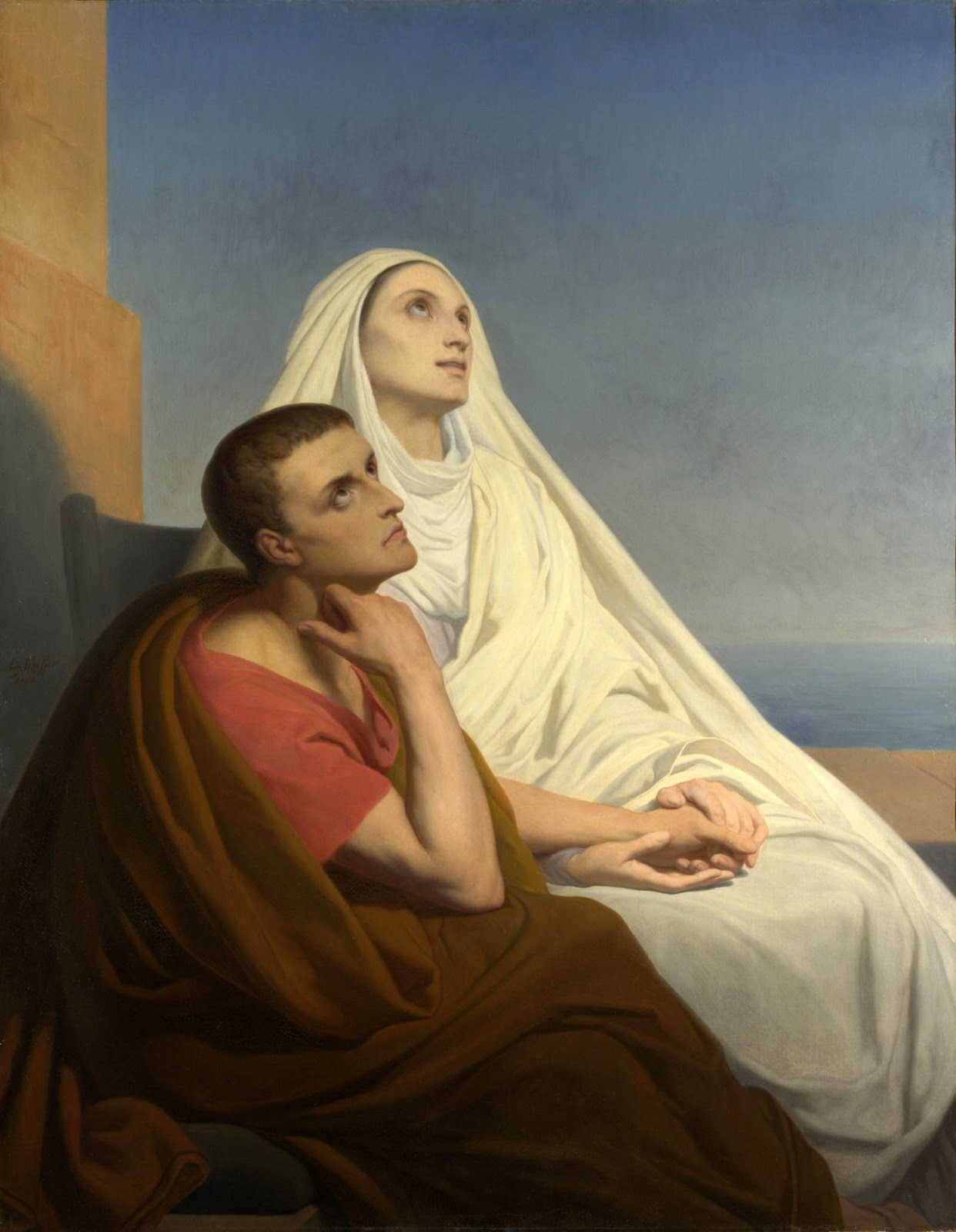
Saint Augustine and his mother, Saint Monica, by Ary Scheffer (painting from 1846)

At this time she visited a certain unnamed bishop who consoled her with the words, "the child of those tears shall never perish." Monica followed her wayward son to Rome, where he had gone secretly; when she arrived he had already gone to Milan, but she followed him again. Here she found Ambrose and through him she ultimately saw Augustine convert to Christianity after 17 years of resistance.

In his book Confessions, Augustine wrote of a peculiar practice of his mother in which she "brought to certain oratories, erected in the memory of the saints, offerings of porridge, bread, water and wine." When she moved to Milan, the bishop Ambrose forbade her to use the offering of wine, since "it might be an occasion of gluttony for those who were already given to drink". So, Augustine wrote of her:

In place of a basket filled with fruits of the earth, she had learned to bring to the oratories of the martyrs a heart full of purer petitions, and to give all that she could to the poor – so that the communion of the Lord's body might be rightly celebrated in those places where, after the example of his passion, the martyrs had been sacrificed and crowned.

— Confessions 6.2.2

Monica and her son spent six peaceful months at Rus Cassiciacum (present-day Cassago Brianza) after which Augustine was baptized by Ambrose in the church of St John the Baptist at Milan. Monica and Augustine left for Africa and they set out on their journey, stopping at Civitavecchia and at Ostia. Here Monica died, and Augustine's grief inspired his Confessions.

== Veneration ==
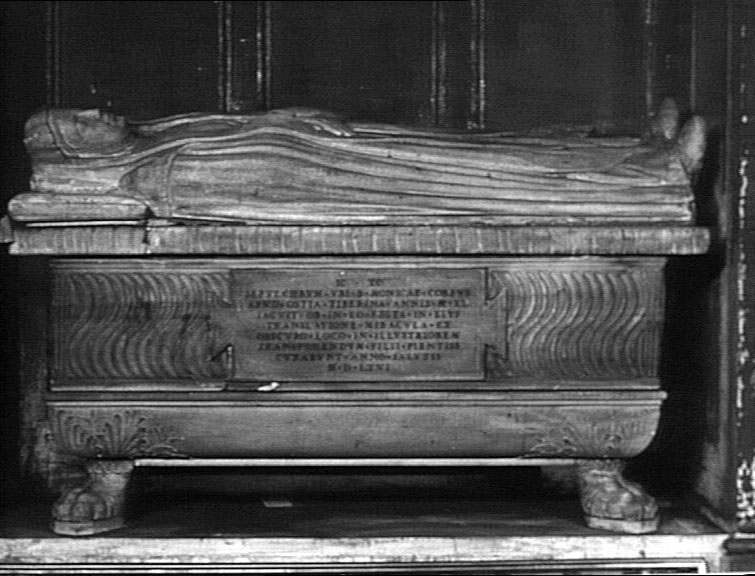
Saint Monica's tomb, Basilica di Sant'Agostino, Rome

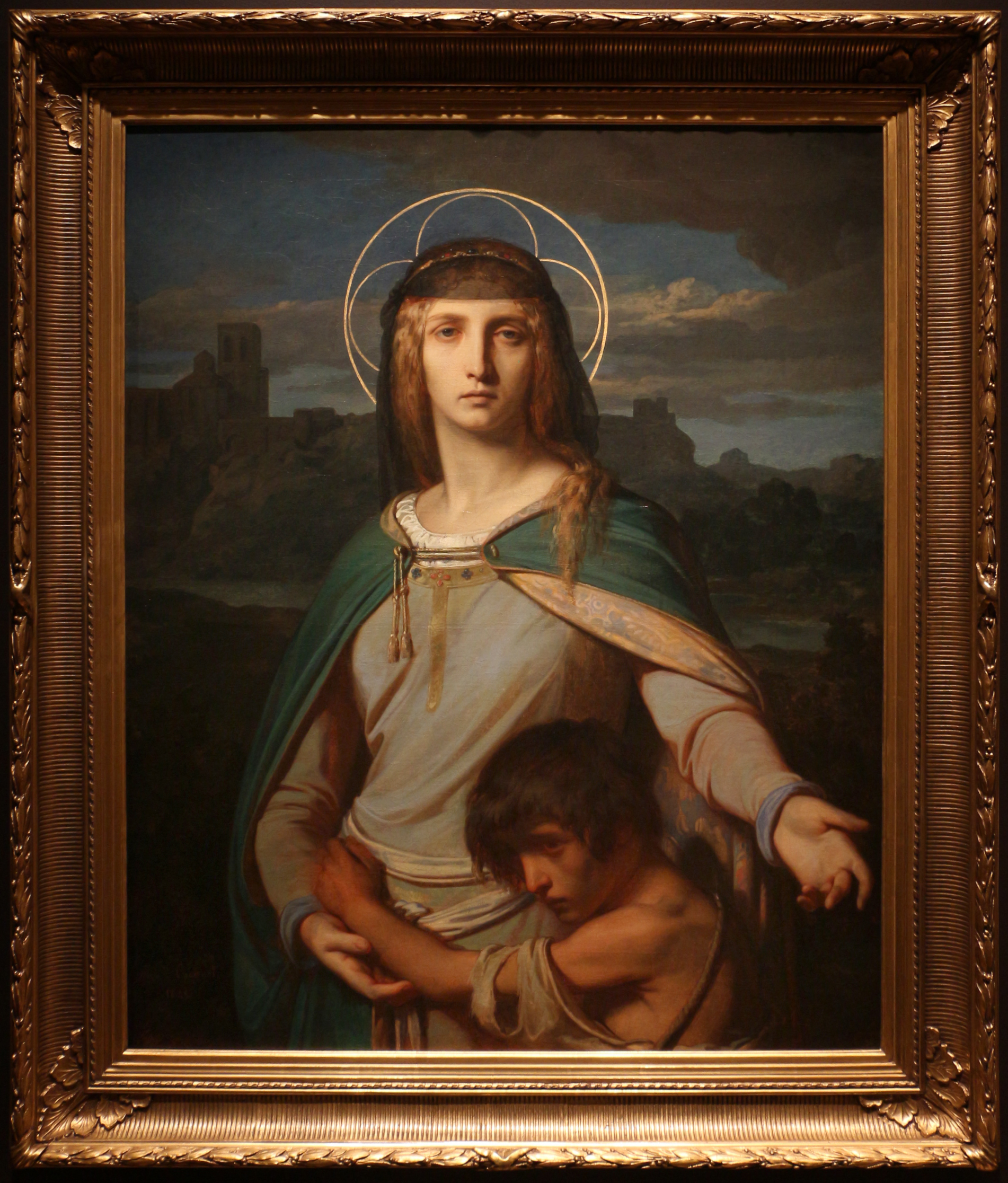
Saint Monica in a landscape by 19th century artist Alexandre Cabanel

Monica was buried at Ostia and at first seems to have been almost forgotten, though her body was removed during the 6th century to a hidden crypt in the church of Santa Aurea in Ostia. Monica was buried near the tomb of Aurea of Ostia. Her tomb was later transferred to the Basilica of Sant'Agostino, Rome.

Anicius Auchenius Bassus wrote Monica's funerary epitaph, which survived in ancient manuscripts. The actual stone on which it was written was rediscovered in the summer of 1945 in the church of Santa Aurea. The fragment was discovered after two boys were digging a hole to plant a football post in the courtyard beside Santa Aurea.

A translation from Latin by Douglas Boin reads:

Here the most virtuous mother of a young man set her ashes, a second light to your merits, Augustine. As a priest, serving the heavenly laws of peace, you taught [or, you teach] the people entrusted to you with your character. A glory greater than the praise of your accomplishments crowns you both – Mother of the Virtues, more fortunate because of her offspring.

During the 13th century, however, the cult of Saint Monica began to spread and a feast in her honour was kept on 4 May. In 1430, Pope Martin V ordered that the relics be brought to Rome. Many miracles are said to have occurred on the way, and the cultus of Saint Monica was definitely established. Later the archbishop of Rouen, Guillaume d'Estouteville, built a church at Rome in honour of Augustine, the Basilica di Sant'Agostino, and deposited the relics of Saint Monica in a chapel to the left of the high altar. The Office of St. Monica, however, does not seem to have found a place in the Roman Breviary before the 16th century.

In 1934, in the Dutch city of Utrecht, the order of the 'Zusters Augustinessen van Sint-Monica' was founded, doing social work, offering a shelter for women with unwanted pregnancies or women who were the victims of domestic violence or abuse. The sisters also started a number of primary schools. In their heyday the order had six convents, in Amsterdam, Utrecht, Sittard, Maastricht, Hilversum and Arnouville on the outskirts of Paris. Since the Hilversum convent, City of God, was closed in 2014, only Utrecht remains as a rest home for the elderly among the sisters, and Casella, a woodland retreat near Hilversum, where young people are still welcome for a meditative sojourn.

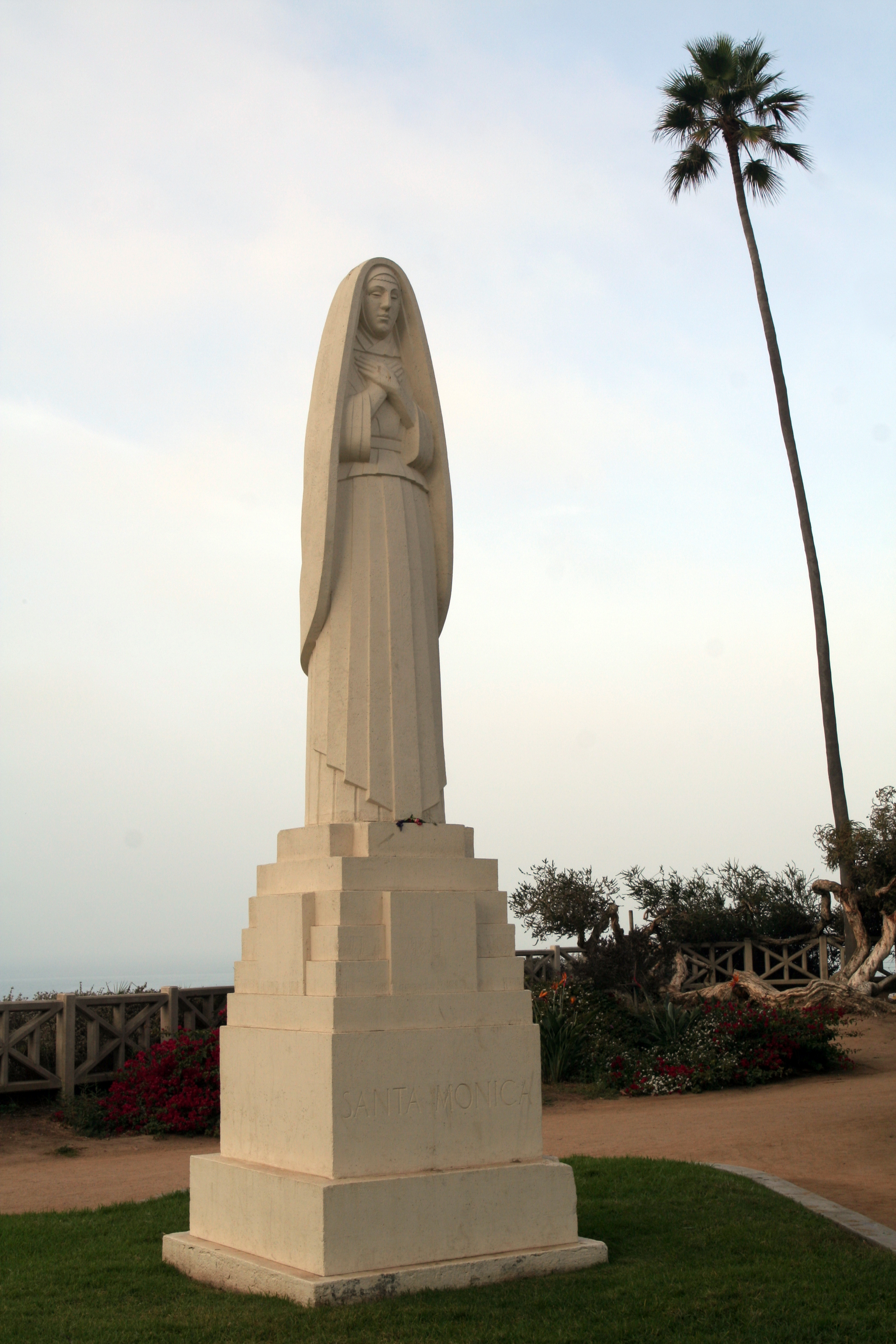
Eugene Morahan, Santa Monica (1935)

The city of Santa Monica, California, is named after Monica. A legend states that in the 18th century Father Juan Crespí named a local dripping spring Las Lágrimas de Santa Mónica ("Saint Monica's Tears"; today known as the Serra Springs) that was reminiscent of the tears that Monica shed over her son's early impiety. As recorded in his diary, however, Crespí actually named the place San Gregorio. What is known for certain is that by the 1820s, the name Santa Monica was in use and its first official mention occurred in 1827 in the form of a grazing permit. There is a statue of this saint in Santa Monica's Palisades Park by sculptor Eugene Morahan; it was completed in 1934.

Monica is honored in the Church of England and in the Episcopal Church on 4 May.

== In popular culture ==
Patricia McGerr fictionalized her life in the 1964 novel My Brothers, Remember Monica: A Novel of the Mother of Augustine.

In the 2010 film Restless Heart: The Confessions of Saint Augustine, Saint Monica is portrayed by Italian actress Monica Guerritore.

In the oratorio La conversione di Sant'Agostino (1750) composed by Johann Adolph Hasse (libretto by Duchess Maria Antonia of Bavaria), Monica's role in the conversion of her son Augustine is dramatized.

In his poem "Confessional", Frank Bidart compares the relationship between Monica and her son Augustine to the relationship between the poem's speaker and his mother.

In "The Angel of Warning", the fifth episode of season 3 of the TV series Evil, David claims Monica was black, although traditionally portrayed as white in religious art. She is actually believed to have been Berber. In the tenth episode of season 3, he calls on St. Monica while jogging past a demonic apparition of sexual temptation in the guise of his colleague Kristen. He continues to pray for deliverance from temptation and is visited by St. Monica.

== Gallery ==
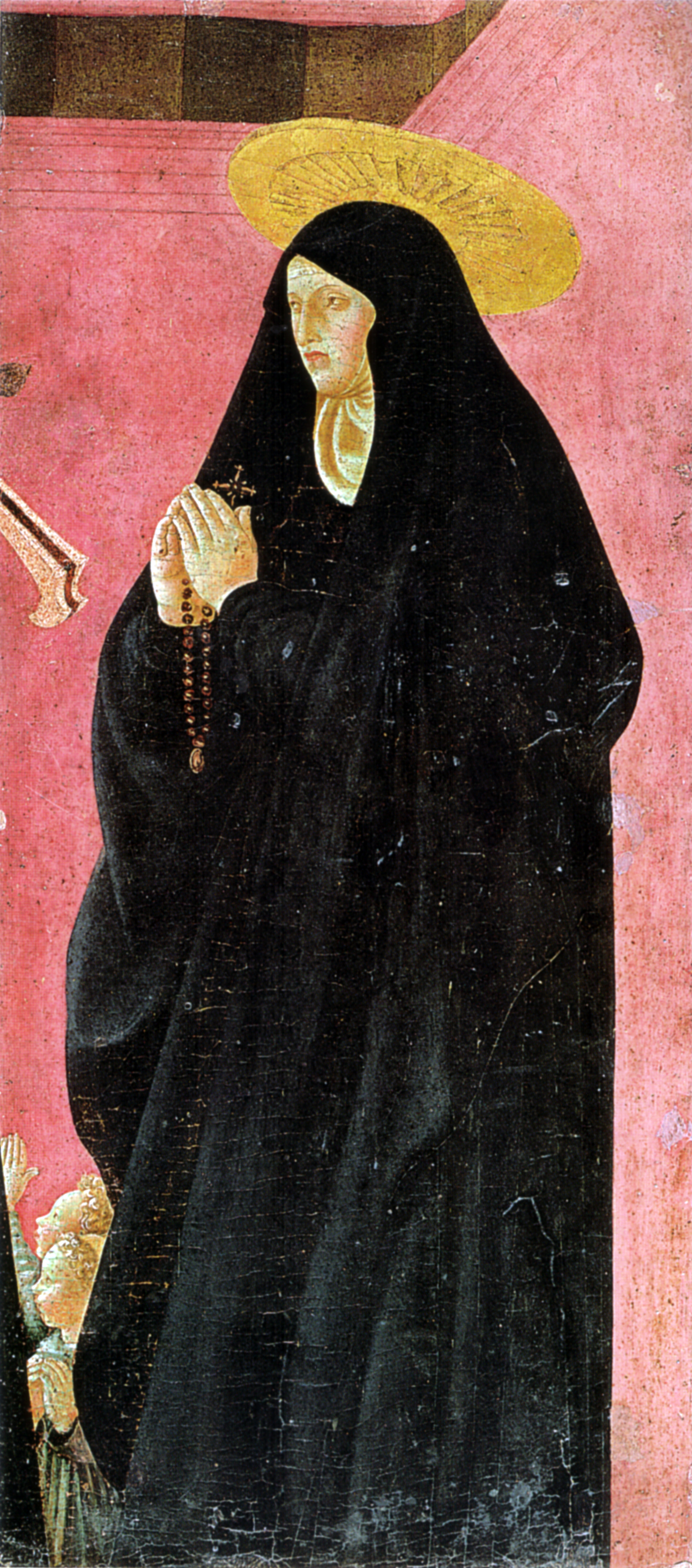
Paolo Uccello, St Monica and two children praying (1430–1435)

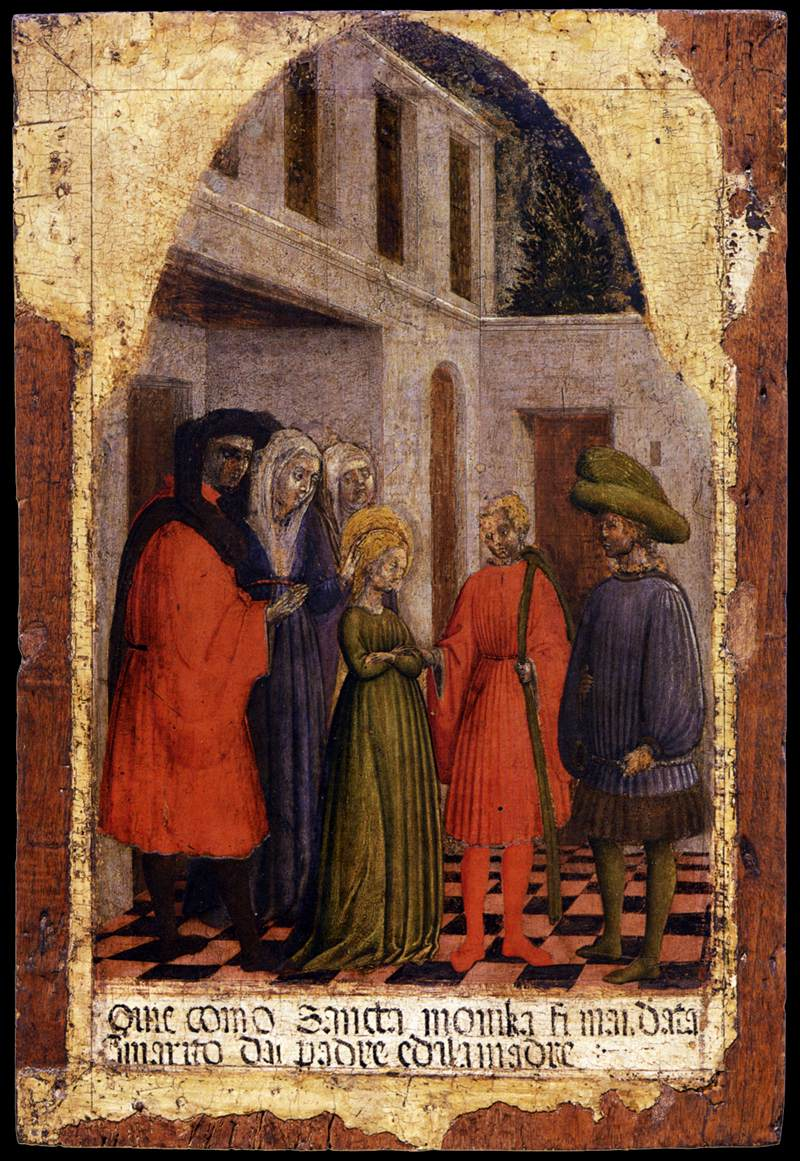
Marriage of Saint Monica by Antonio Vivarini, 1441

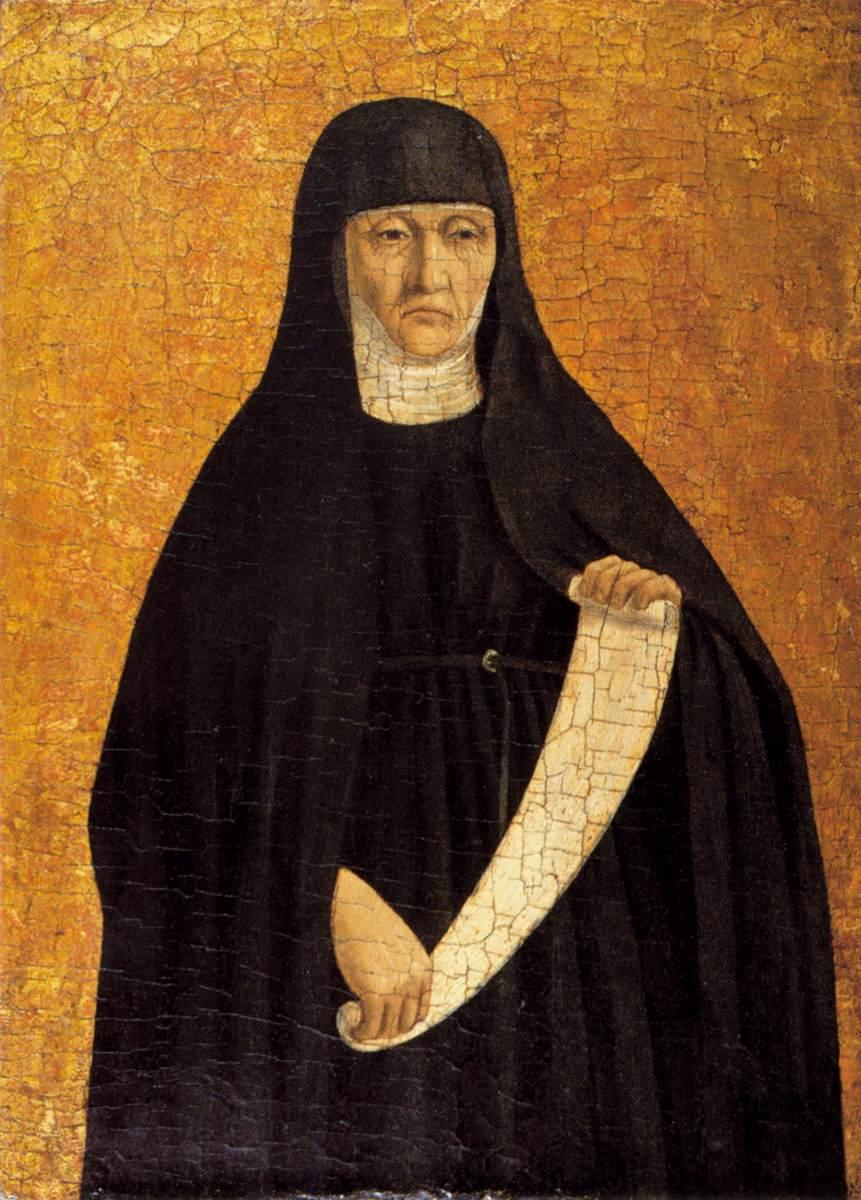
Piero della Francesca, Polyptych of St Augustine: St Monica (1460)

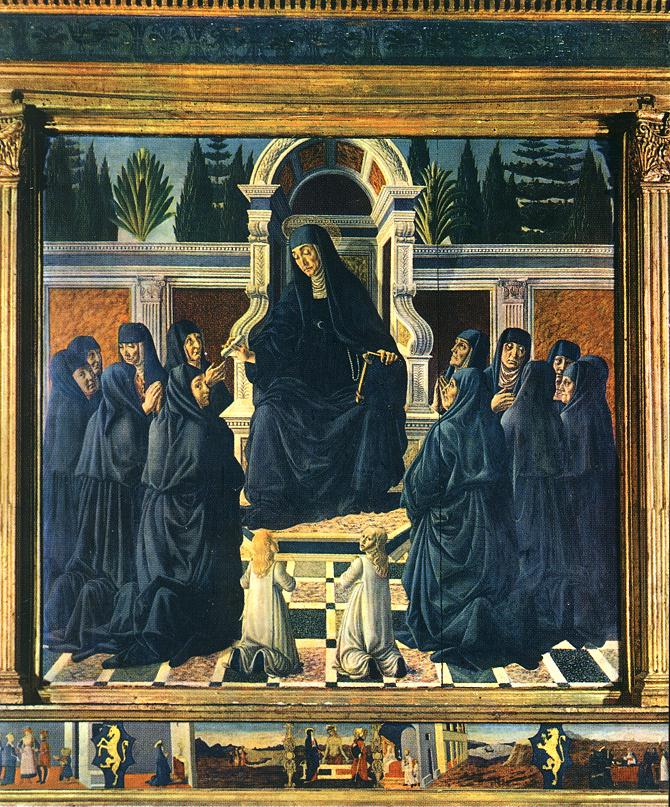
Francesco Botticini, Saint Monica enthroned with Augustinian nuns (1471)

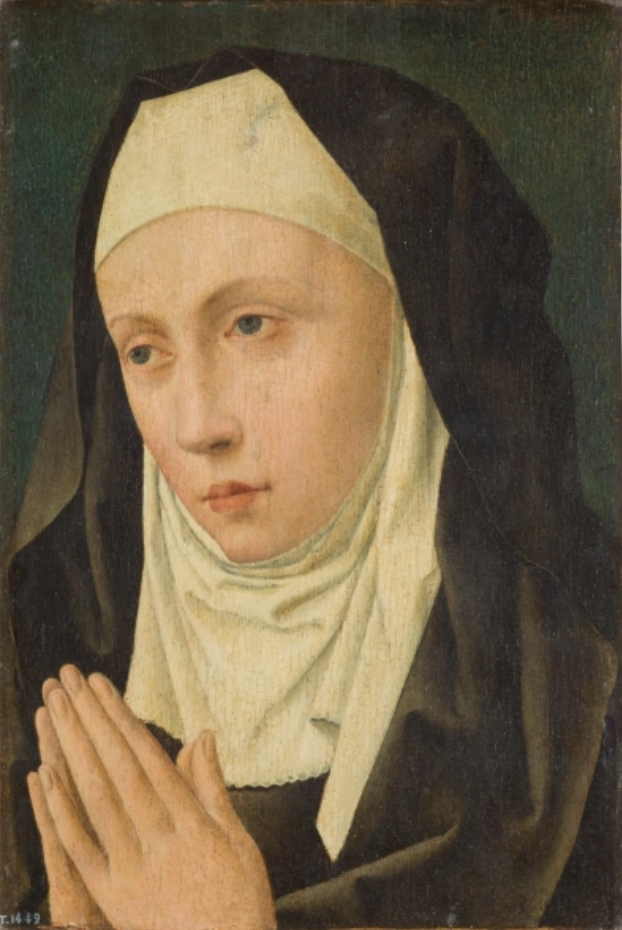
Follower of Albrecht and Dirk Bouts, Saint Monica (16th c.)

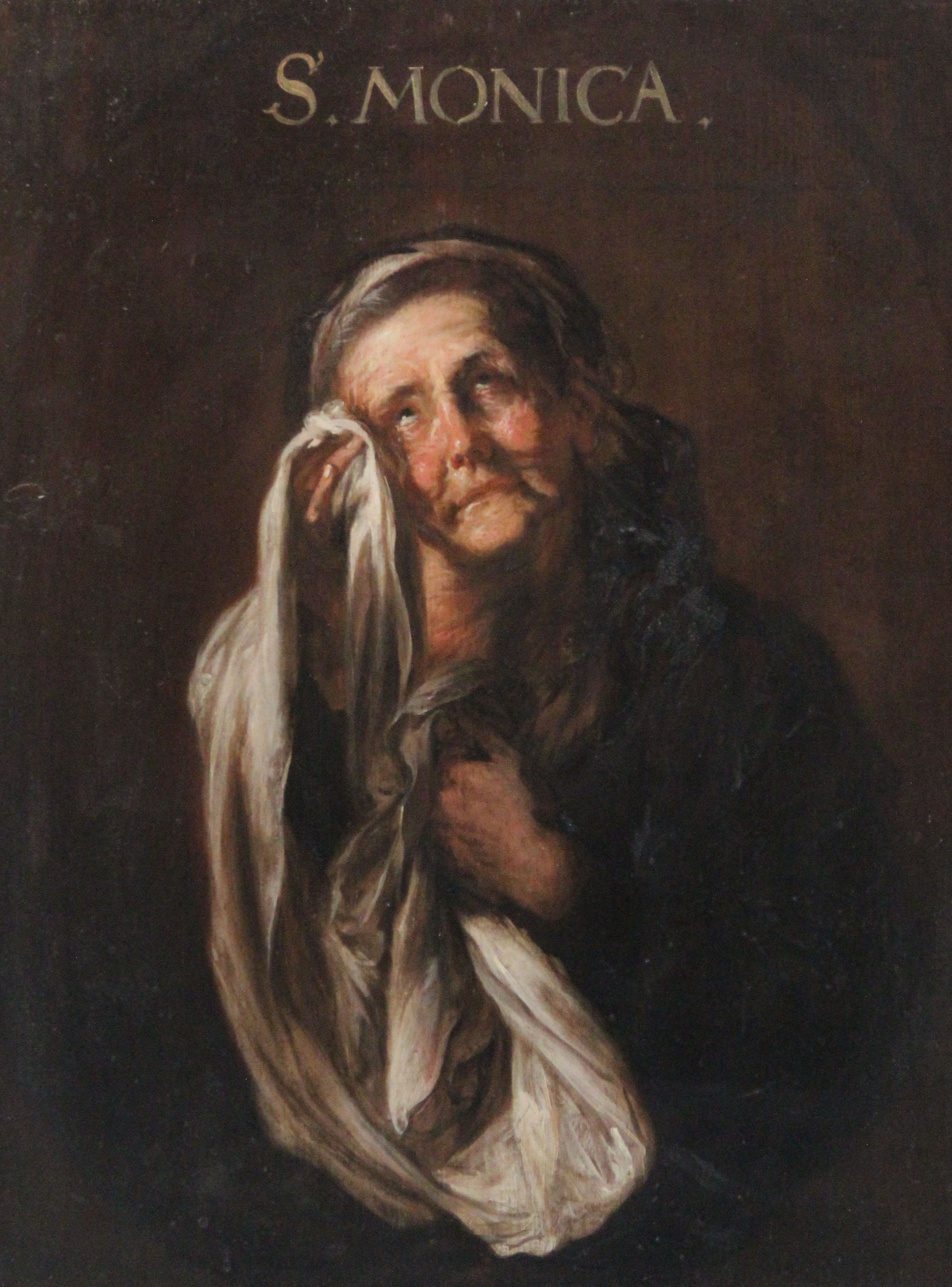
Michael Willmann, Saint Monica (1660–70) National Museum in Wroclaw

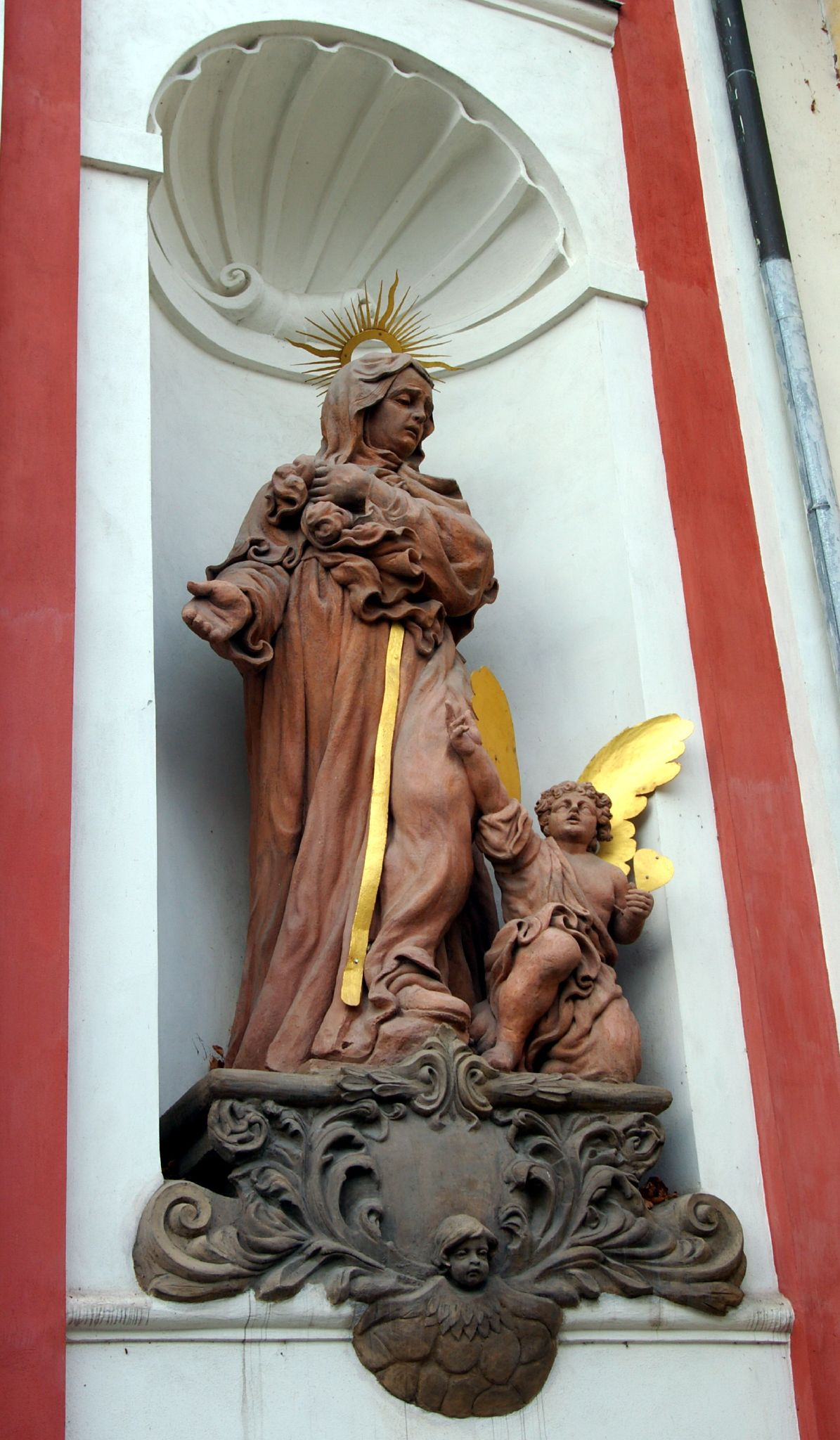
Statue of St. Monica on the façade of a former Augustinian church in Tábor, Czech Republic, c. 1700

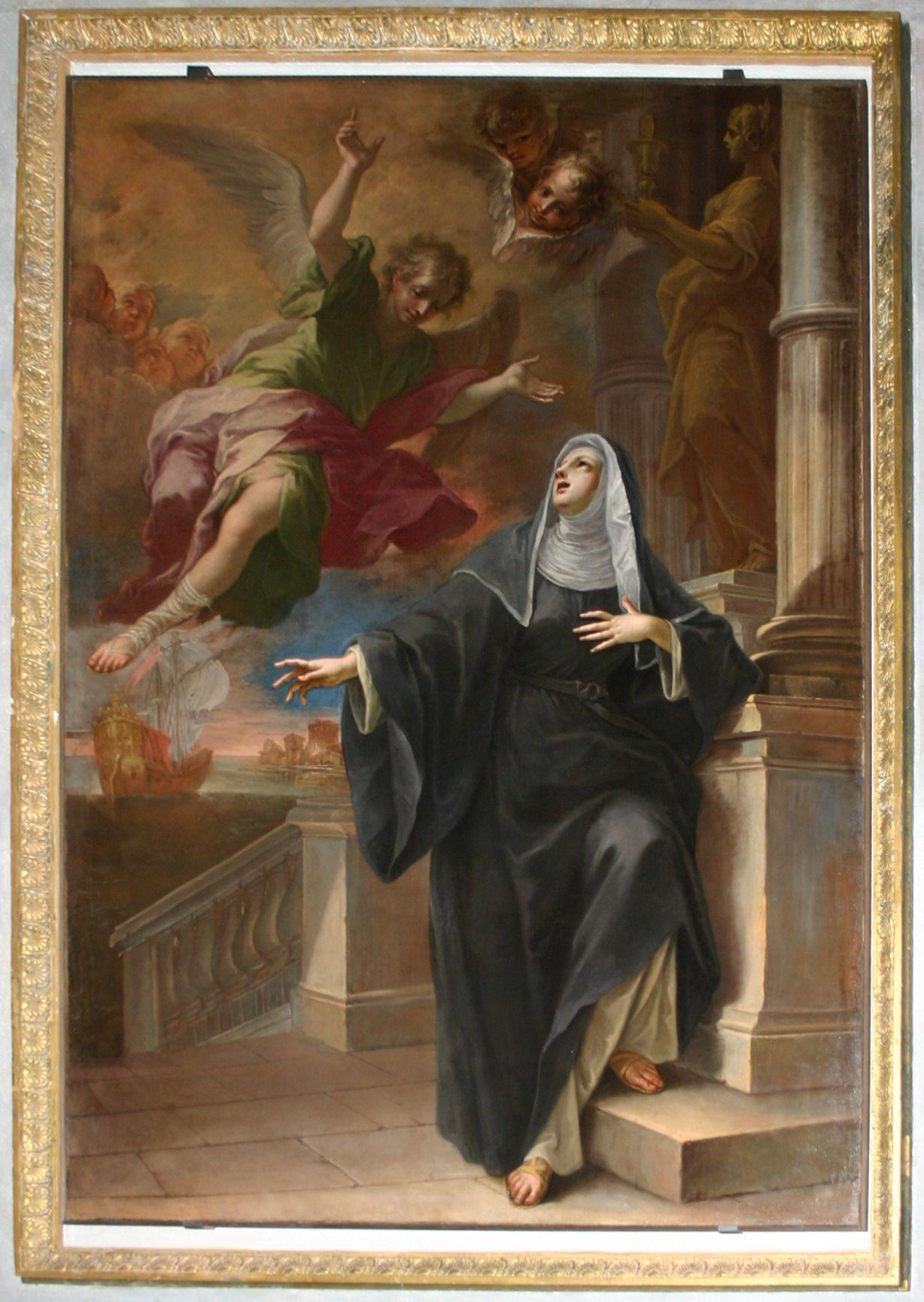
The Angel Appears to Saint Monica by Pietro Maggi, 1714

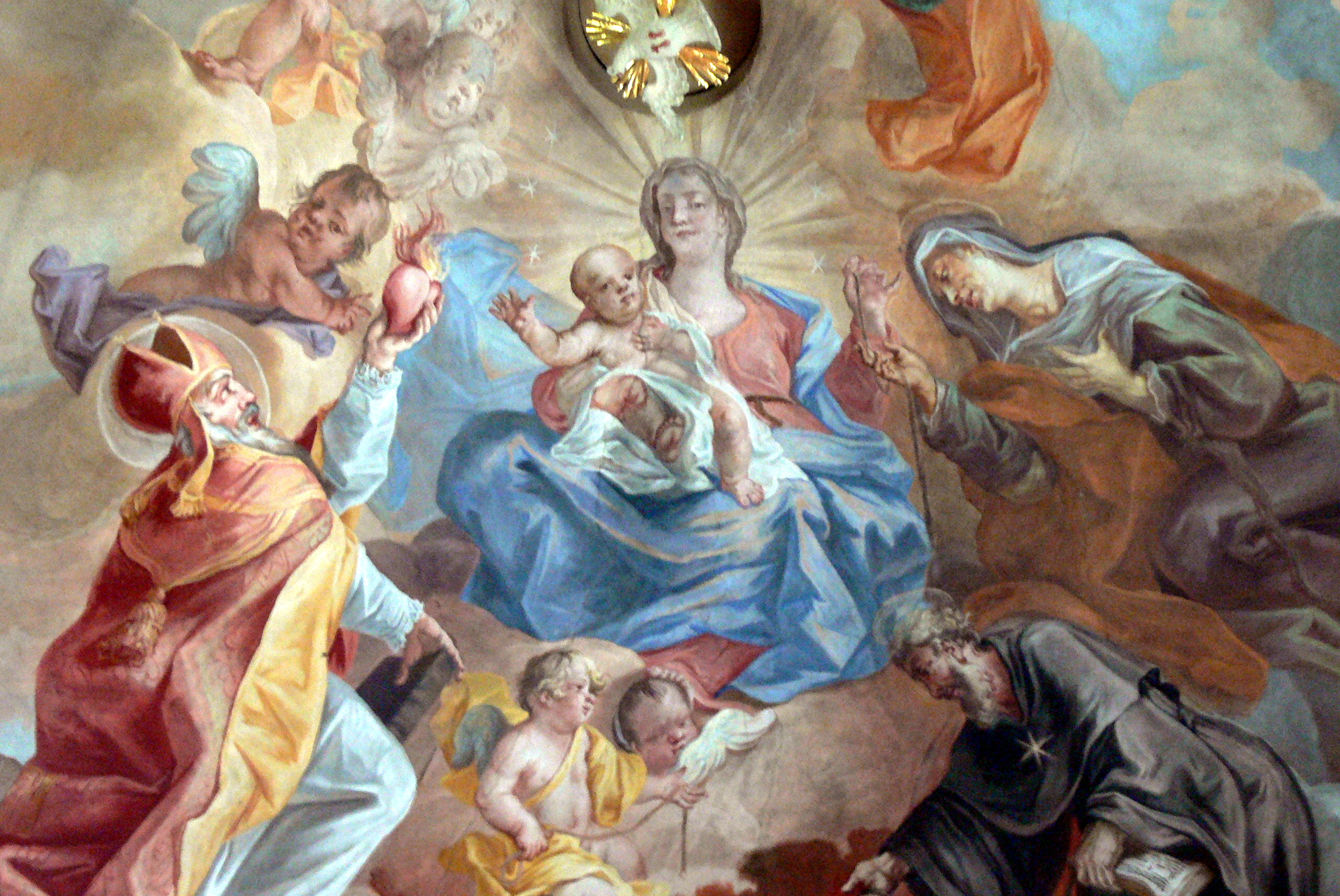
Fresco by Simon Benedikt Faistenberger, 1749

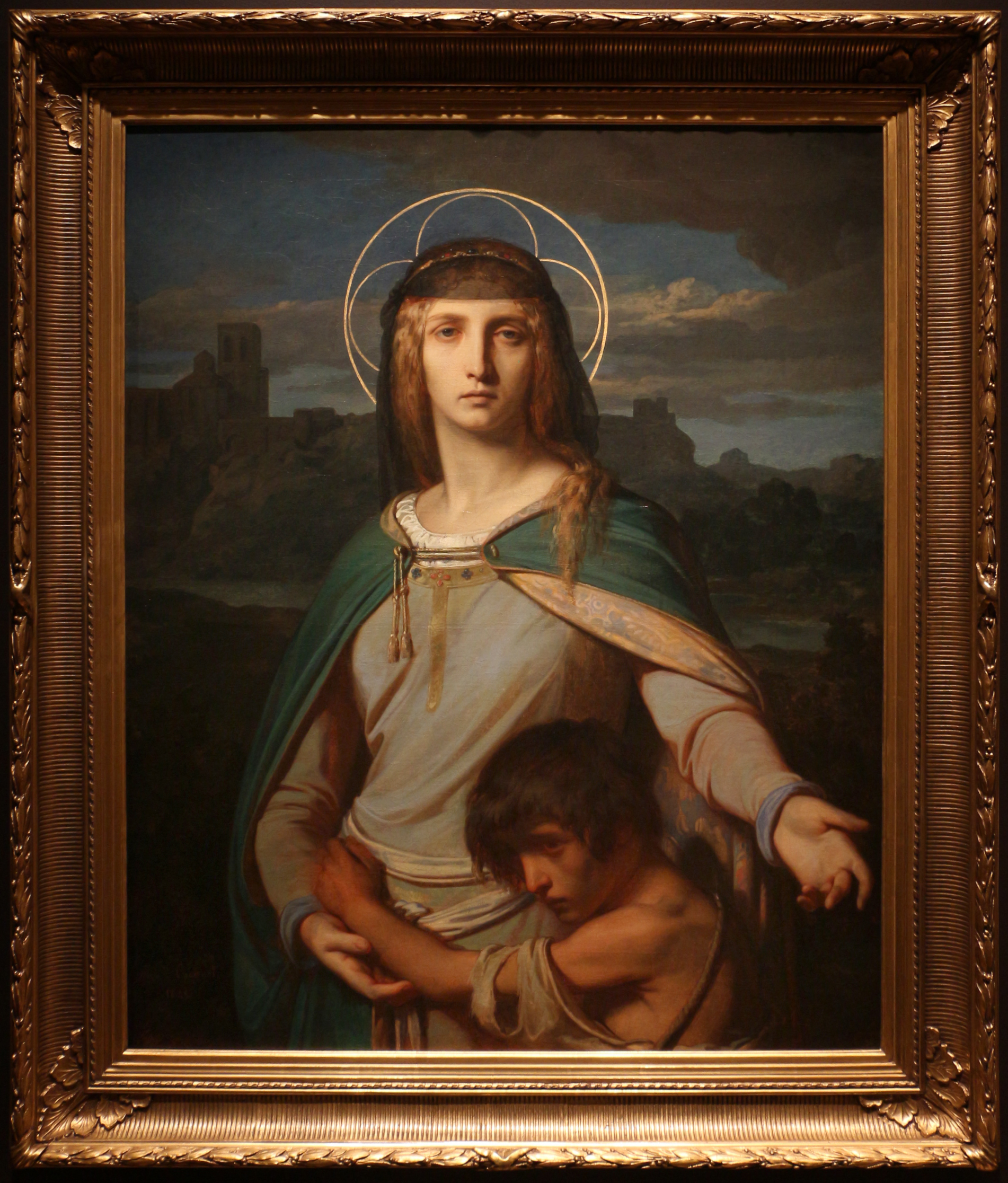
Alexander Cabanel, Saint Monica in a Landscape (1800s)

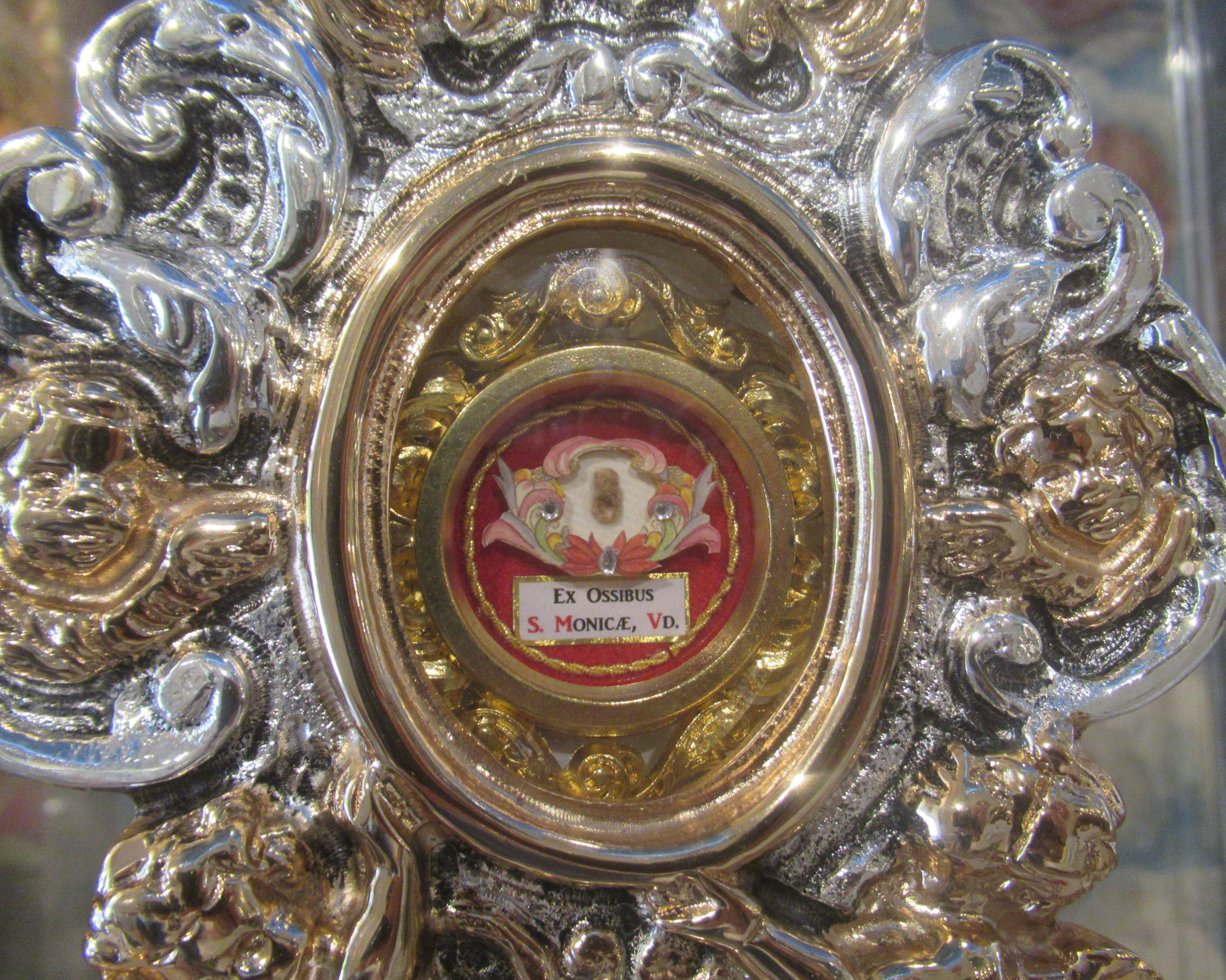
Relic in Saint Augustine Parish Church (Baliwag)

== See also ==
- List of Catholic saints
