= Heinar =

- Gender: Male

Other names
- Related names: Eino

Heinar is a masculine given name.

People named Heinar include:

- Heinar Kipphardt (1922–1982), German writer
