= Gestation III =

Wooden sculpture in Santa Monica, California, U.S.

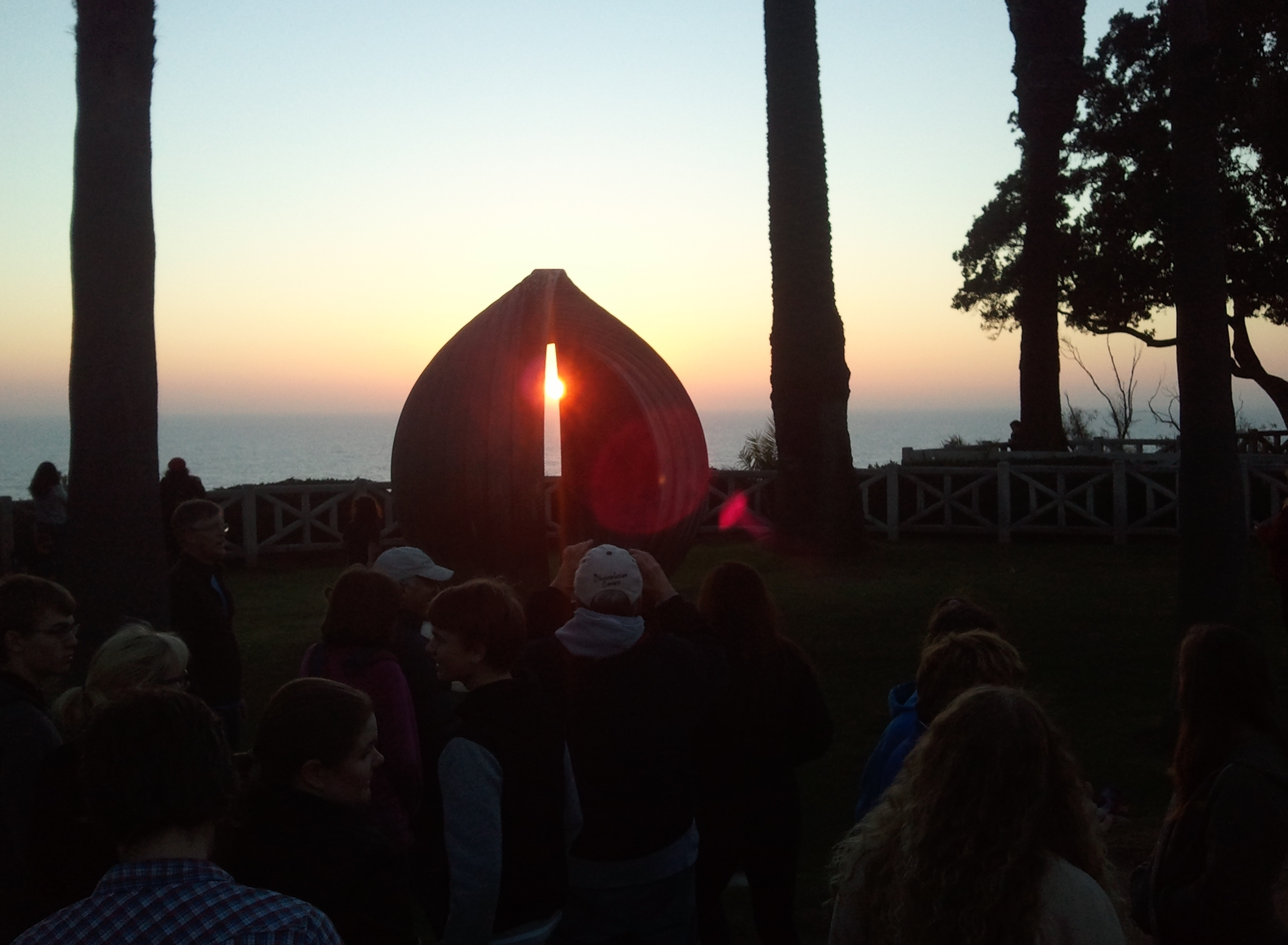
- Artist: Baile Oakes
- Year: 1990
- Medium: Wooden sculpture
- Location: Santa Monica, California, U.S.; 34°01′21″N 118°30′31″W

Gestation III is a 1990 wooden sculpture by Baile Oakes, installed in Santa Monica, California's Palisades Park, in the United States. The sculpture measures approximately 10 ft. 7 in. x 11 ft. 8 in. x 8 ft. 6, and was surveyed by the Smithsonian Institution's 'Save Outdoor Sculpture!' program in 1994.

According to the Santa Monica Mirror, the work "aligns visually with the Northern Hemisphere’s winter solstice sunset" and "draws a small group to watch the winter solstice sun set".

Gestation III stands at the continent's edge, where its central aperture captures the interplay of water, sunlight, earth, and air—the vital forces driving creation, renewal, and birth. Emerging from this circular void, the sculpture expands into an inviting form that welcomes visitors to step inside and find solace in its serene enclosure.Viewed from the southwest, gazing toward the ocean and sky's distant horizon, the sculpture's core seems to narrow into a slender vertical slit. The sun's appearance at the top of this opening signals the onset of the solstice period. Day by day, it descends lower within the frame until the Winter Solstice arrives. On that pivotal day, the sun sets precisely at the center, heralding the sun's revival—the seed of spring's impending emergence.

Gestation III is the third work in a series of sculptures created by Oakes. The first Gestation was created in Seattle and commissioned for World Expo 88 in Brisbane, Australia, where it currently resides in the pedestrian mall on the city's high street, Queen Street. Due to the complexity and scale of its multi-ring cast bronze fabrication running close to the exposition's opening deadline, the sculpture had to be rushed across the Pacific via air freight inside a Boeing 747 freighter plane. Locally, the sculpture has affectionately earned the nickname "The Bronze Onion" among Brisbane residents due to its uniquely layered, organic bulbous shape.

== See also ==
- 1990 in art
- List of public art in Santa Monica, California
