= Spaceship Earth (sculpture) =

Sculpture by Eino at Kennesaw State University

Coordinates: 34.21823°N 84.25712°W

- Artist: Eino
- Year: 2000–December 2006; November 2007–December 2022
- Type: Brazilian Blue Quartzite
- Location: Kennesaw State University, Kennesaw

Spaceship Earth was a 350,000-pound Brazilian blue quartzite sculpture created by Finnish American artist Eino Romppanen, Eino. The sculpture was commissioned by Brian Maxwell of Powerbar the Maxwell Family Foundation for the late environmentalist David Brower and its name was often used by Brower referring to mankind traveling through life in a common vehicle. Displayed at Kennesaw State University adjacent to the Social Science building, the sculpture was the first LEED-certified building at the University System of Georgia.

The 175-ton chunk of rock was formed from 88 individual pieces of quartzite and bonded with specially made polyepoxide. After these pieces were in place, Eino attached a life-size bronze model of the late Brower. Additionally, 2,400 bronze pieces were added to the exterior to outline land masses on the earth.

Spaceship Earth was completed in August 2006 and unveiled in October. The sculpture broke apart and started spilling over just two months later. First reports cited poor adhesive and unsound construction contributed to its demise while Eino argued that it had to have been an act of vandalism. The sculpture was rededicated in November 2006.

The sculpture was knocked down and removed from the Kennesaw State University campus on December 20, 2022.

== History ==
A few months before the November 2000 death of the first Executive Director Sierra Club and lifelong environmentalist David Brower, the founders of PowerBar, Brian and Jennifer Maxwell, commissioned the 175-ton tribute in his honor. It was during a morning run with photographer Galen Rowell and PowerBar's Brian Maxwell that the tribute was conceived. Shortly after, Maxwell met with his friend, environmentalist and Finnish-American artist Eino, to create such a sculpture.

Eino was sent stone samples from a rock quarry in Brazil at the start of the project and "[he] thought, oh my, this is three times harder than marble. But immediately I understood this was the right stone. It is more permanent than anything else. No pollution can hurt it. No graffiti will harm it. It was the right stone to be here for 1,000 years." Over 175 tons of Brazilian blue quartzite was shipped and stored in a parking lot while Eino and Maxwell sought to secure a home for the sculpture. Locations in Berkeley to Washington, D.C., were proposed, but all were turned down by local art commissions or city councils. For nearly a year, Eino argued to have the sculpture placed in the streets of San Francisco, but the San Francisco Arts Commission's Visual Arts Committee turned it down by saying it "not only had little or nothing to do with the city" but "was too big and did not represent Brower's ideals."

Later, in 2004, Jennifer Maxwell, then the widow of Brian Maxwell, contacted the City of Berkeley to find a home for the tribute. A few members of the Berkeley Arts Commission spoke out against the sculpture's design and how it seemed to be forced on the city. In October 2004, the commission voted 7–2 to accept the sculpture with conditions. For final approval by the Civic Art Commission 15-foot-wide (4.6 m) sculpture could not be adorned with the bronze statue of Brower, and the Maxwell family had to pay the entire installation cost. By 2005, with a push from the Mayor, the Civic Art Commission found nearly 30 different locations the sculpture could live. In August 2005, two Berkeley area commissions voted to consider another location. While negotiations were dragging on with bureaucrats in Berkeley, officials at Kennesaw State University contacted Eino and accepted the memorial.

The sculpture resided at Kennesaw State University, adjacent to the Social Science building. Nearly six years after its conception, Spaceship Earth was finished and unveiled on October 20, 2006. In late December 2006, only three months after its installation on campus, Spaceship Earth collapsed. The sculpture was intended to be a permanent reminder to future generations to take care of their delicate planet. After the collapse, Eino attributed the disaster to vandalism, but later reports associated the collapse with poor construction. Reconstruction was to begin in February 2007 but was delayed until July and was completed by November 2007.
