= Eugene Morahan =

American sculptor (1869–1949)

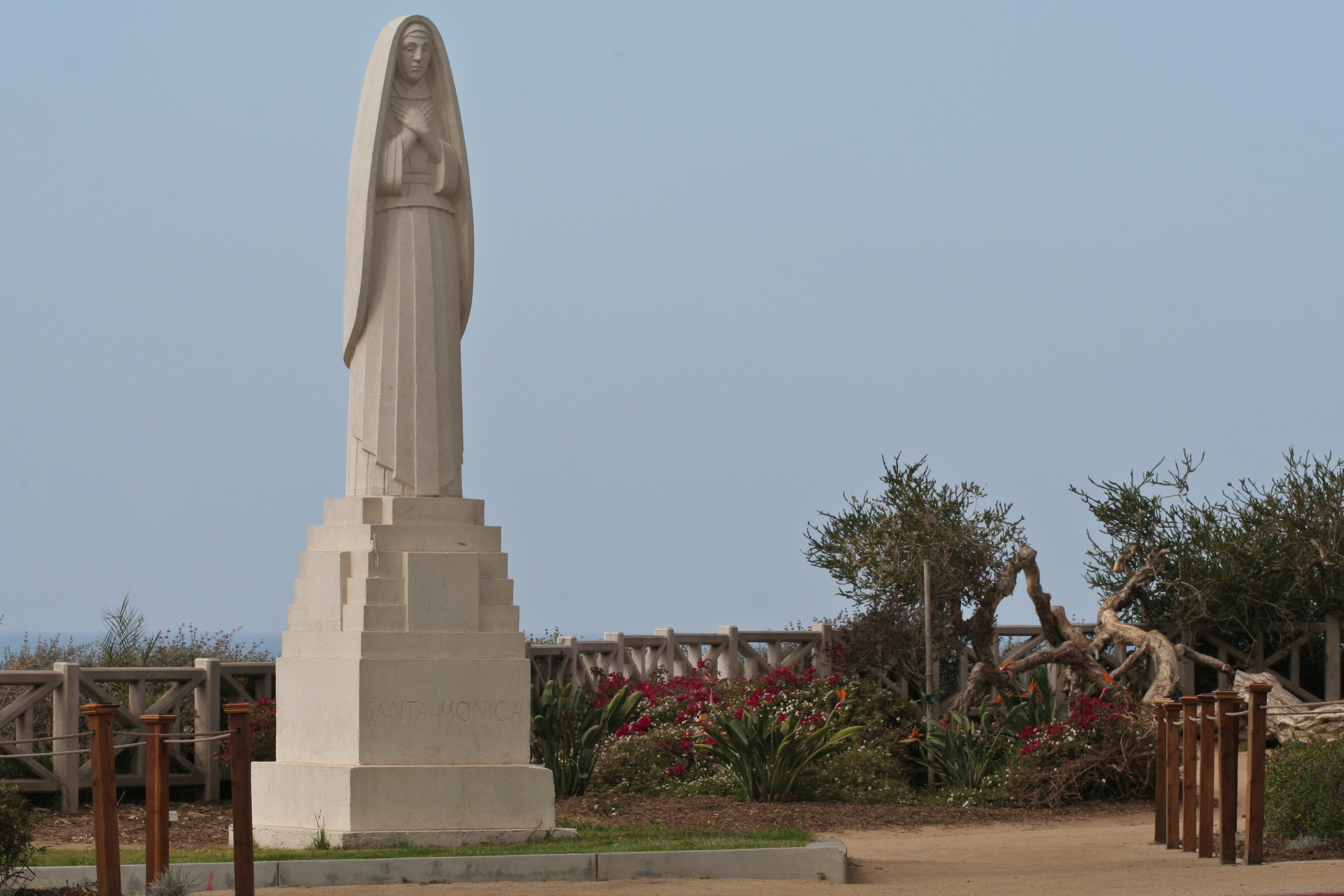
Art Moderne-style saintly mother

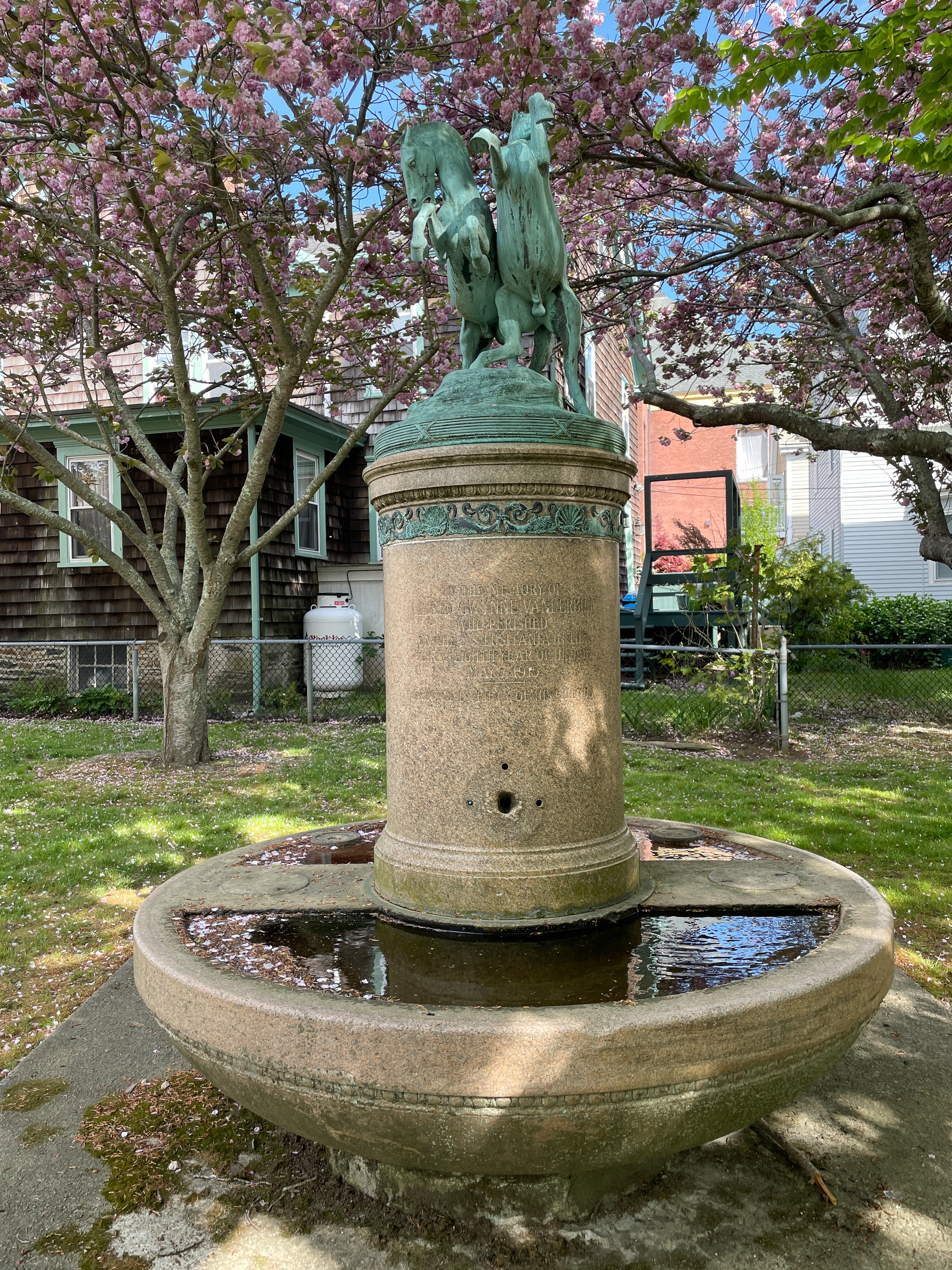
Morahan was the sculptor for this fountain in memory of Alfred Gwynne Vanderbilt, who died with the Lusitania in 1915.

Eugene H. Morahan (August 29, 1869 – November 14, 1949) was an American sculptor.

Born in Brooklyn, New York, he was a student of Augustus Saint-Gaudens.

Morahan sculpted:

- the Alfred Vanderbilt Memorial Fountain in Newport, Rhode Island
- the Samuel Manning Welch memorial and the Elks Memorial in Buffalo, New York
- the McGregor Memorial Fountain in Fort Myers, Florida
- panels of the Carroll Gardens war memorial in Brooklyn
- the Cuddy Memorial, a portrait panel of a British naval officer, at St. Barnabas' Church, Bexhill, England
- ”many portrait busts in New York, Philadelphia, Chicago, and Washington, D.C.”
- in 1934, the PWAP-sponsored Santa Monica sculpture that sits at the end of Wilshire Boulevard.
- the bronze equestrian statue of Father Eusebio Kino in the Tumacácori National Historical Park museum

During his time in California, Morahan was acquainted with the comedian Will Rogers and created an equestrian statue of him from memory after his death. Gutzon Borglum, a friend, and the sculptor of Mount Rushmore, took a break from that project to help him finish Santa Monica on time for the unveiling.

Morahan was married to Grace Storey Putnam (an artist and the creator of the Bye-Lo baby doll) from 1927 to 1941. Morahan and his wife moved to Santa Monica in 1930. He had a daughter, Adele Morahan, and a stepson, George C. Putnam (whose biological father was the sculptor Arthur Putnam). Morahan died in 1949 in Santa Monica, at the age of 80.
