= Palisades Park (Santa Monica) =

Park in Santa Monica, California, United States

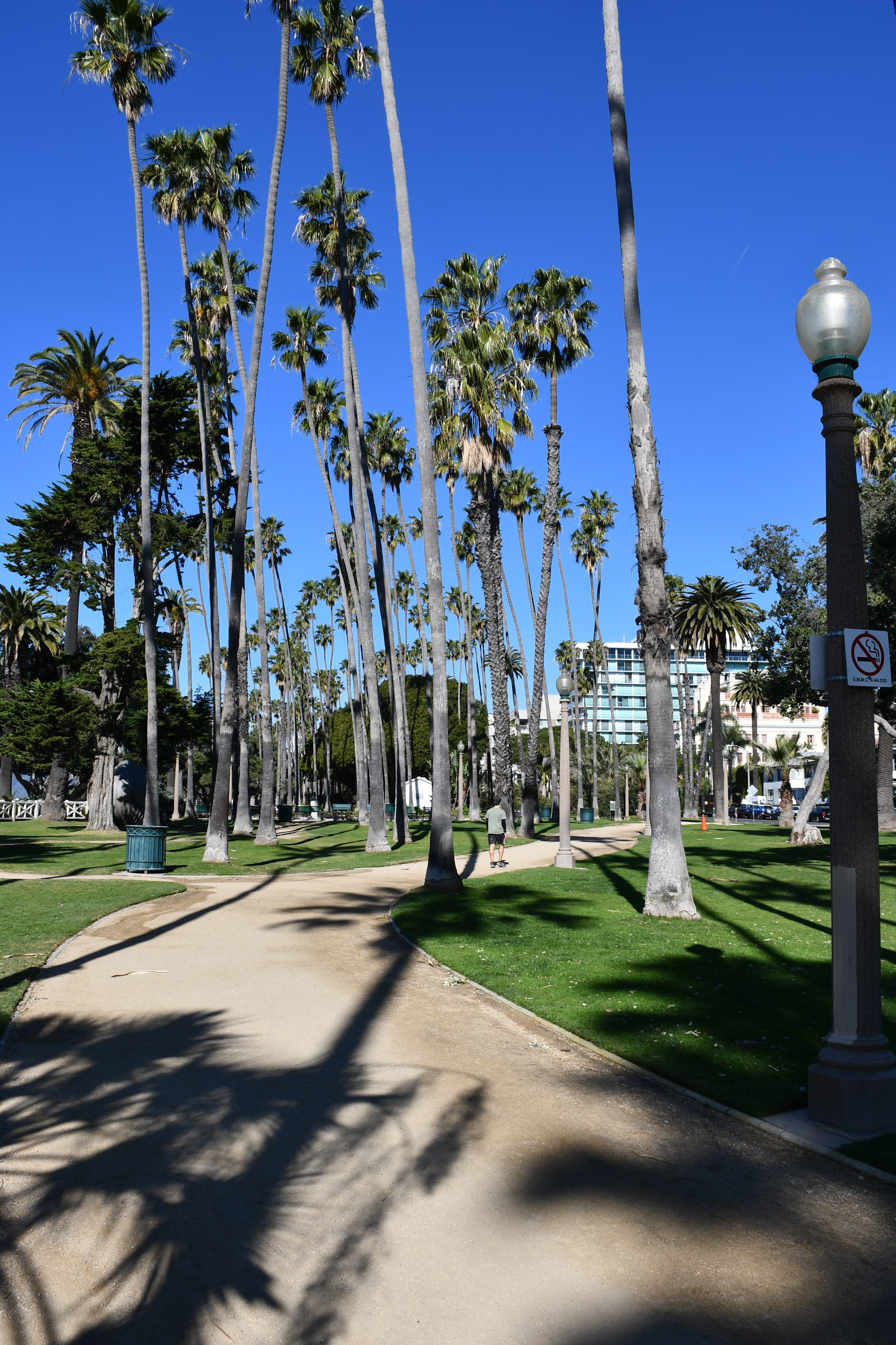
- Interactive map of Palisades Park
- Location: Ocean Avenue
- Nearest city: Santa Monica, California
- Coordinates: 34.0231°N 118.5095°W
- Area: 26.4 acres (10.7 ha)
- Created: 1892
- Operator: Santa Monica Community Services Department

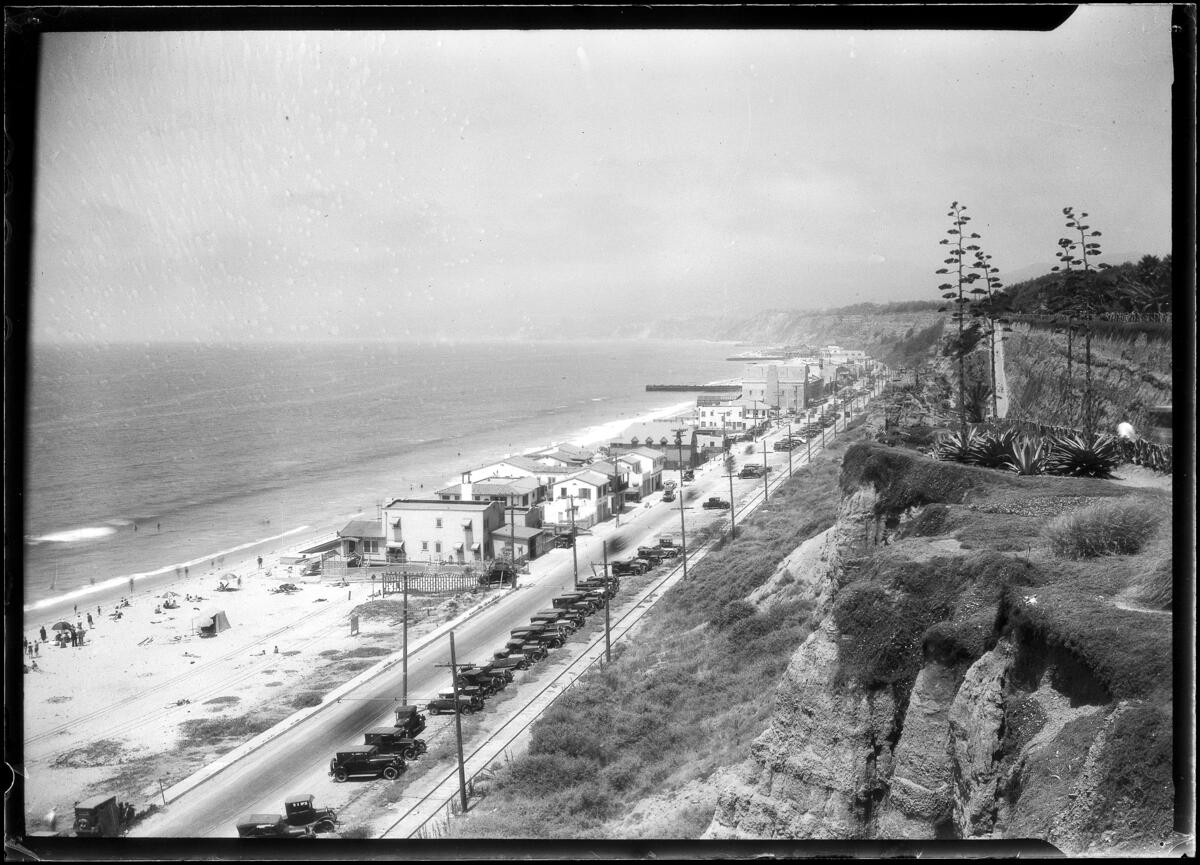
The Santa Monica coastline looking north from Palisades Park, c. 1920

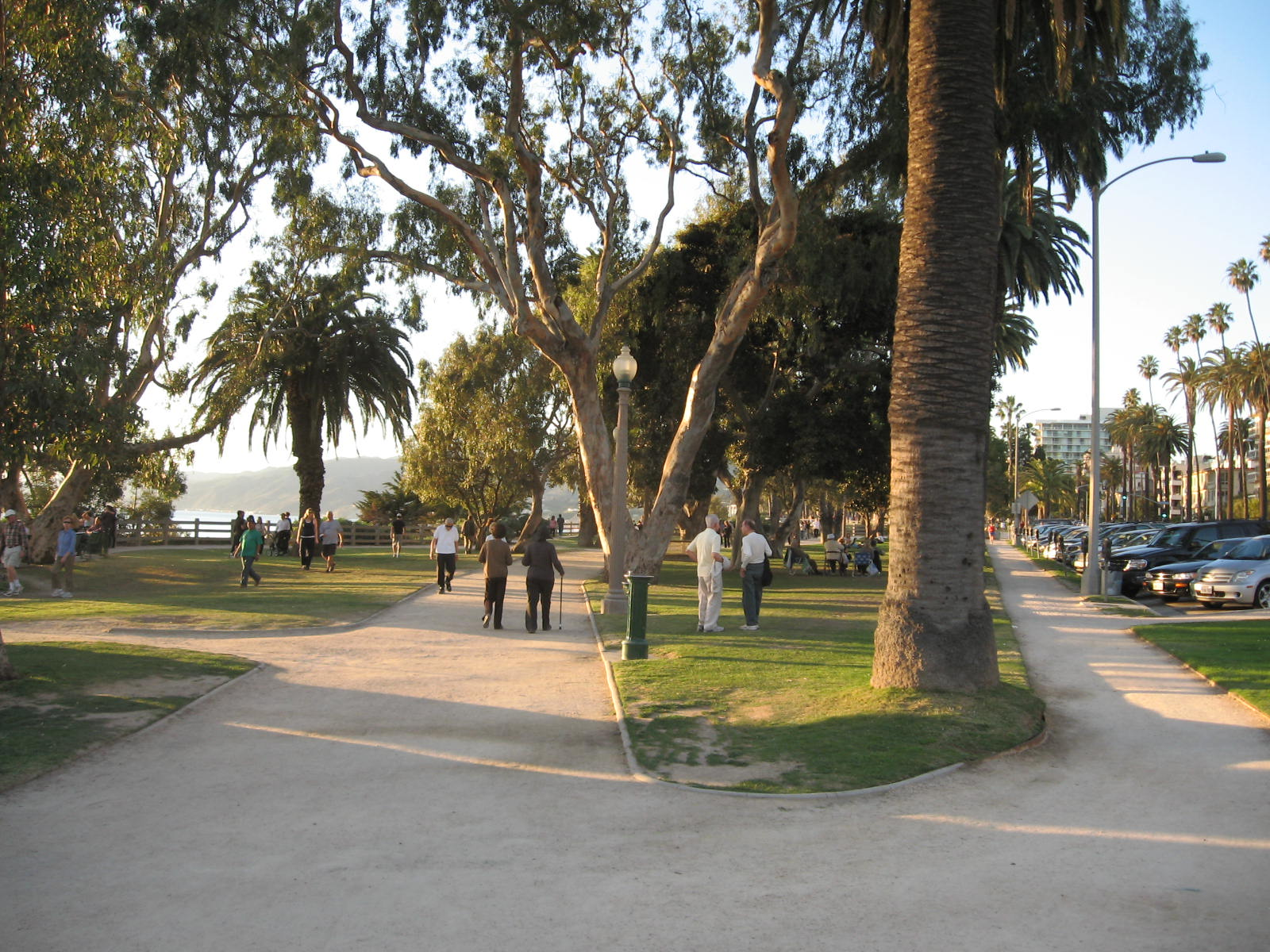
Palisades Park in Santa Monica

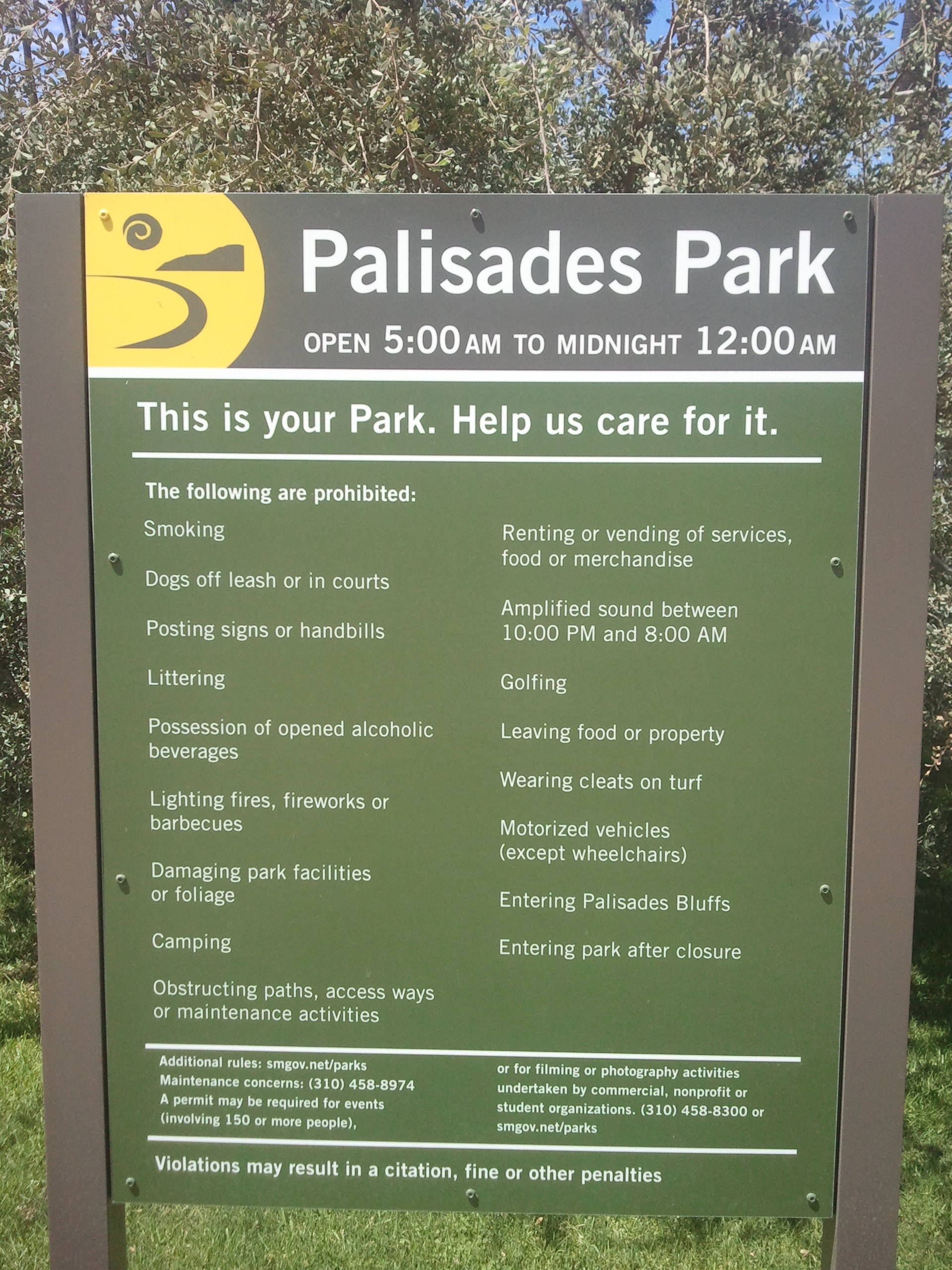
Palisades Park informational sign

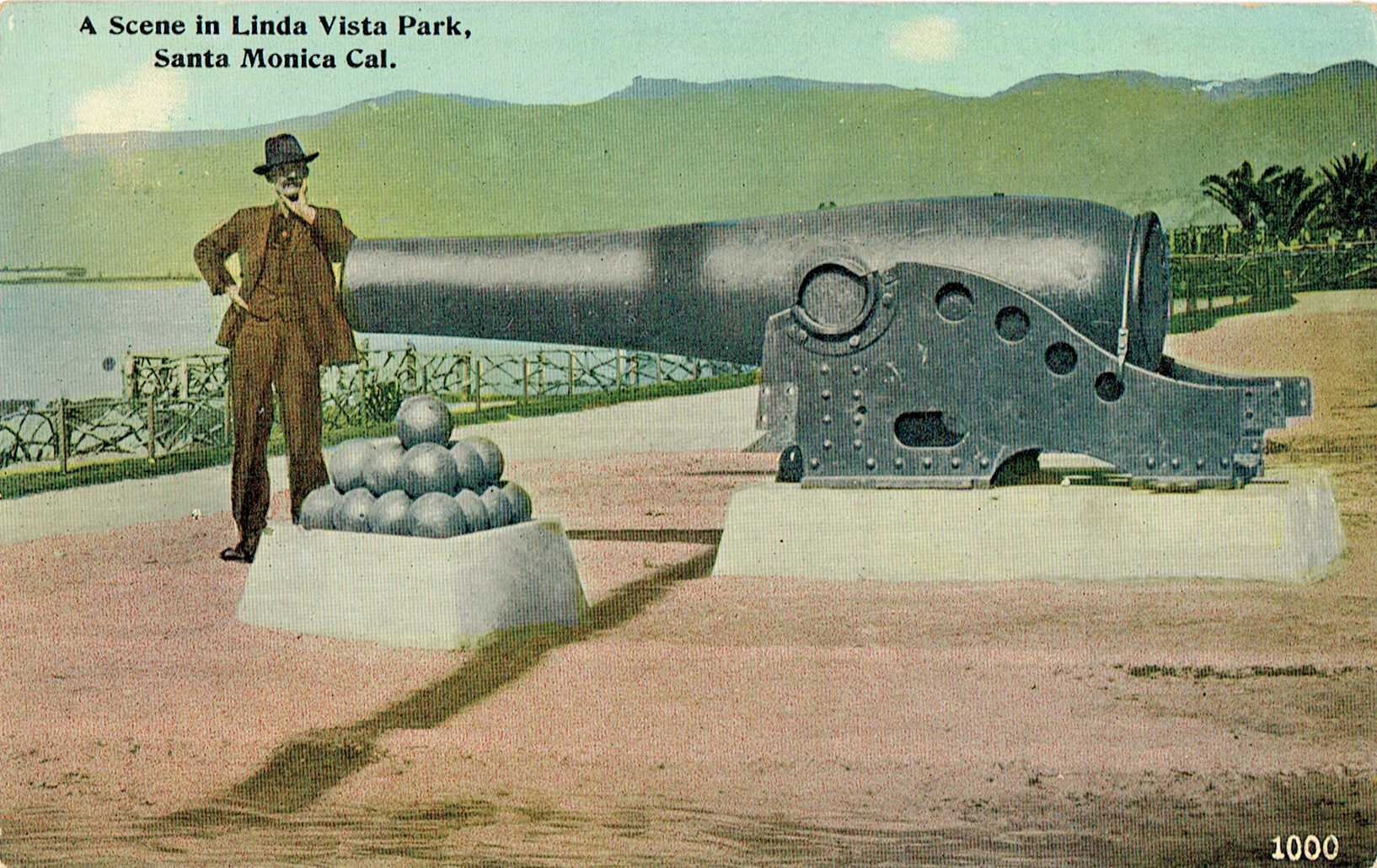
Civil War cannon (1908) in Palisades Park (formerly Linda Vista Park), Santa Monica

Palisades Park is a 26.4-acre (10.7 ha) park in Santa Monica, California. The park is located along a 1.6-mile (2.6 km) section of Ocean Avenue on top of an uplifted unconsolidated sedimentary coastal Quaternary terrace with exposed bluffs, offering views of both the Pacific Ocean and the coastal mountains. Originally named Linda Vista Park, it was established in 1892 following donations by city founders Arcadia Bandini de Stearns Baker and John Percival Jones.

== History ==
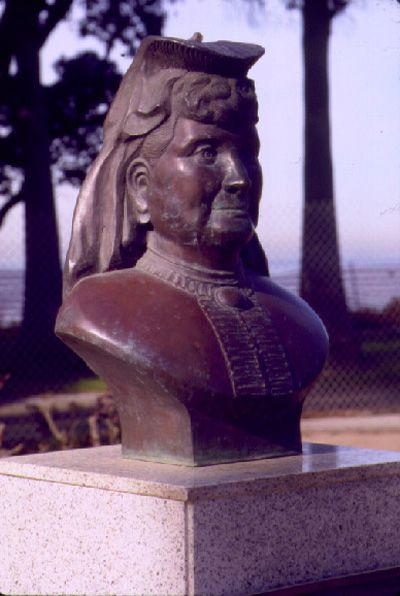
The Bust of Arcadia Bandini de Baker honors the founder of both the city and the park, Arcadia Bandini de Stearns Baker.

The earliest portion of the park was gifted to the City of Santa Monica in 1892 by city founders Arcadia Bandini de Baker and John Percival Jones. The park was originally named Linda Vista Park until 1915.

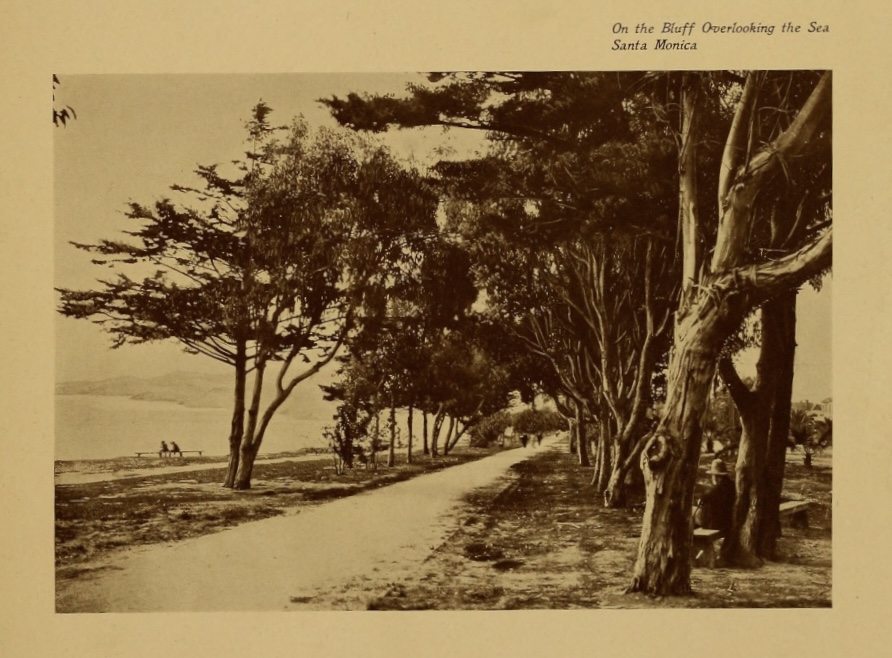
”On the Bluff Overlooking the Sea, Santa Monica” (1904)

Throughout the early 1900s, the city expanded the park with additional land and commissioned upgrades to the area, installing walking paths, planting landscaping, and erecting lighting. In 2007, the park was designated as a historic landmark by the city of Santa Monica.

Today, the park extends from the Santa Monica Pier at the south to Adelaide Drive at the north. This long linear park contains public art, rose garden, and historic structures, as well as benches, picnic areas, pétanque courts, restrooms and the historic Santa Monica Camera Obscura. Barriers discourage visitors from approaching too close to the cliffs, which are prone to erosion and landslides. Private use of the park by fitness instructors has generated some controversy.

There was a train/streetcar stop at the park called Linda Vista station; the building was torn down in 1955.

== Public art and historic features ==
The oldest structure built in Palisades Park is the Idaho Gate, a Craftsman-style archway built in 1912 and named for the adjacent street, and a distinctive Native American totem pole was donated to the City in 1926 by Walter J. Todd. After the installation of Eugene H. Monrahan's 1934 sculptural statue of Santa Monica, additional public art was installed more than fifty years later.

- Bust of Arcadia Bandini de Baker honoring city founder and benefactor Arcadia Bandini de Stearns Baker
- Civil War cannon (1908) (terminus of Colorado Avenue and Broadway) The cannon is an 1861 Rodman seacoast gun on loan from the Federal Government. The cannon was brought to Santa Monica in 1908 from San Francisco
- Idaho Gate (1912) by Greene and Greene (terminus of Idaho Avenue)
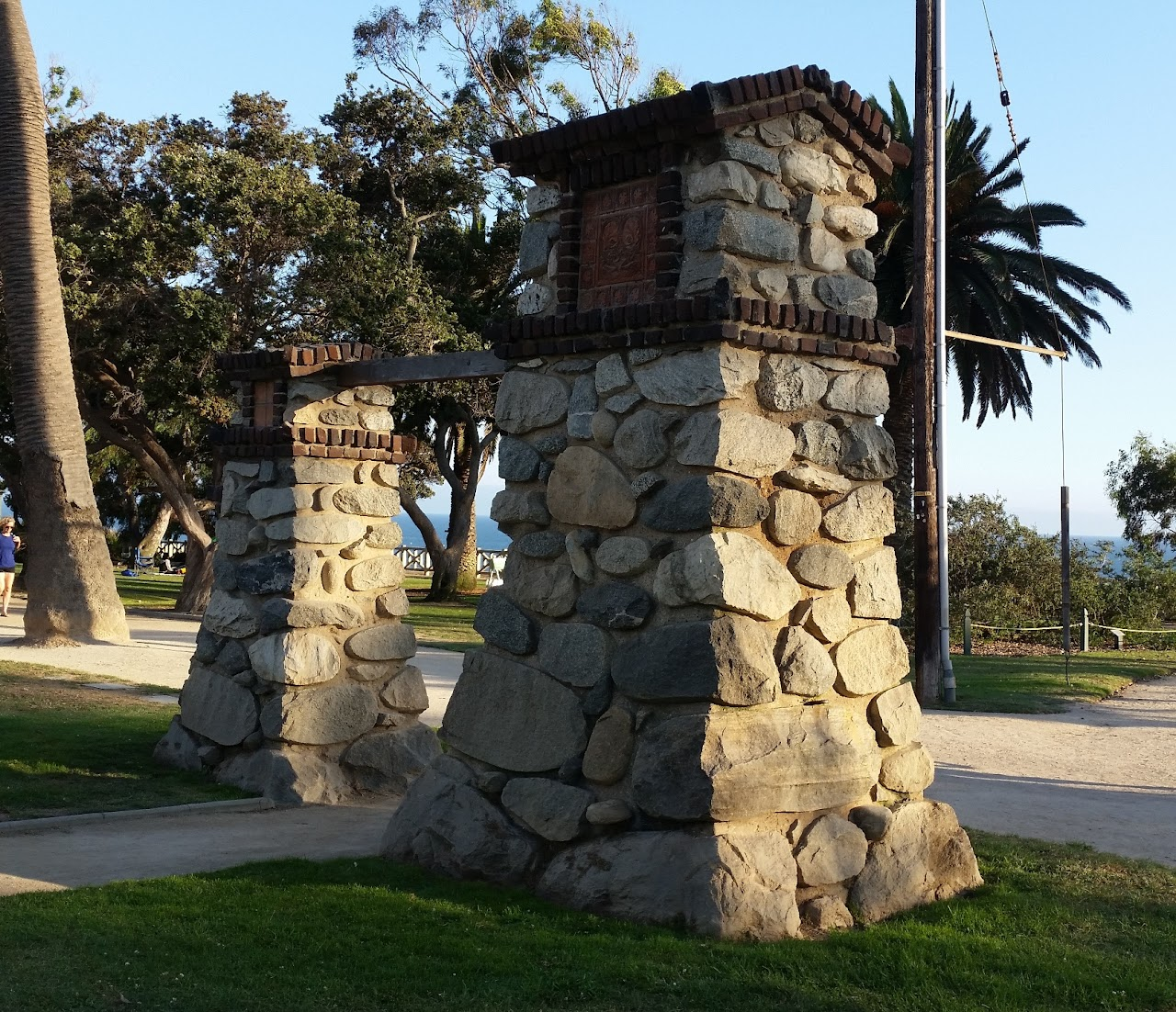
  Craftsman-style masonry gates of granite field stone and brick, with 2-foot by 2-foot Batchelder tile insets
- Statue of Santa Monica (1934) by Eugene H. Monrahan (terminus of Wilshire Boulevard)
- Bust of Arcadia Bandini de Baker (1987) by Masahito Sanae, near rose garden (terminus of Palisades Avenue)
- Wood sculpture Gestation III (1993) by Baile Oakes (winter solstice sunset alignment) (terminus of Palisades Avenue)
- Sculpture Beacon Overlook (2000)] by Jody Pinto, near California Incline (terminus of California Avenue)
- Totem pole (circa 1925; artist unknown) (terminus of San Vicente Boulevard, Santa Monica)
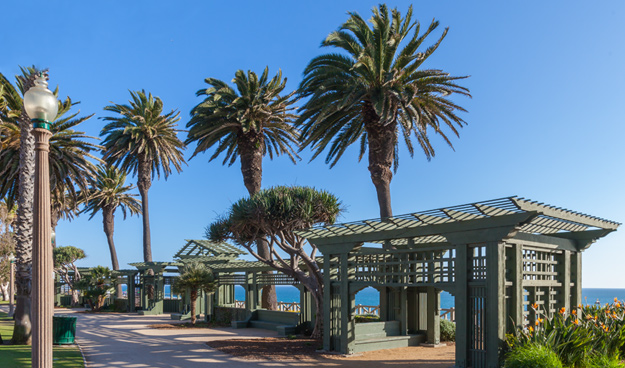
- Built in 1912 and is an outstanding example of a Craftsman-style Pergola.
  The Redwood Pergola: known as: The Pergola, Architect: Unknown, Built: 1912, located between Washington Boulevard and Idaho Avenue

== Trees ==
The park has more than 30 species of plants and trees, including gum, yate, pine, palm, and fig trees. Two stone monuments with plaques honor two noted tree experts, George Hastings and Grace Heintz, who both wrote books on the trees of Santa Monica. Spanning five decades from 1944 to 1989, the works provide five baseline studies for understanding the history and geography of the urban woodland of the park, as well as the trees in Santa Monica and neighboring portions of Los Angeles, including cemeteries, schools, colleges, and businesses.

Some of the tree species at Palisades Park include:

- Monterey cypress, Hesperocyparis macrocarpa (Hart.) Bartel
- Indian laurel fig, Ficus microcarpa L.
- rusty-leaf fig, Ficus rubiginosa Desf.
- Yate, Eucalyptus cornuta Labill.
- Murray River red gum, Eucalyptus camaldulensis Dehnh.
- Italian stone pine, Pinus pinea L.
- Canary Island date palm, Phoenix canariensis Chaub.
- European fan palm, Chamaerops humilis L.
- Mexican fan palm, Washingtonia robusta Wendl.
- Mexican blue palm, Brahea armata S. Watson
- windmill palm, Trachycarpus fortunei Wendl.
- Cuban royal palm, Roystonea regia (Kunth) O. F. Cook
- Senegal date palm, Phoenix reclinata Jacq.
