= Fountain Family Group =

1969 bronze sculpture by Richard H. Ellis

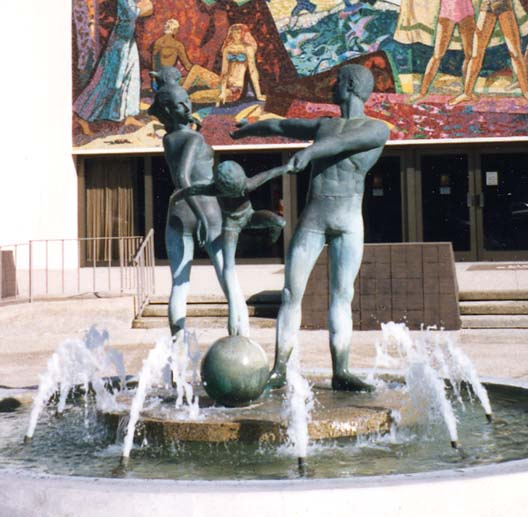
- Sculpture and fountain (photographed 1995)
- Artist: Richard H. Ellis
- Year: 1969
- Medium: Bronze sculpture
- Location: Hilbert Museum of California Art, Orange, California, U.S.; 33.7890°N 117.8566°W

Fountain Family Group, sometimes called Nuclear Family, is a 1969 bronze sculpture and fountain by Richard H. Ellis, formerly installed along Wilshire Boulevard in Santa Monica, California.

== Description and history ==
The artwork features four figures: a father, a mother, a boy, and a girl. The original location of the fountain and bronze was the intersection of Wilshire Boulevard and 26th Street in Santa Monica, with a street address of 2600 Wilshire Blvd.

The 8 ft (2.4 m) tall sculpture was installed in 1969 at one of Howard Ahmanson Sr.’s richly decorated Home Savings of America branches, along with a mosaic mural called Pleasures Along the Beach by Millard Sheets. The Millard Sheets Studio hired Ellis several times. Ellis created statues for five Home Savings branches, all on family themes.

Family was surveyed by the Smithsonian Institution's Save Outdoor Sculpture! program in 1995.

The fountain and mural at the former Santa Monica branch were relocated to the Hilbert Museum of California Art in Orange, California in 2019, along with a third piece from the building, John Edward Svenson's cast bronze Child on a Dolphin. Family and Dolphin will be installed in the museum's California native plant garden when it reopens after expansion in 2023; the Sheets mosaic will be installed on the facade of the museum building.

The original building also featured stained glass windows by Susan Hertel; they were removed and put into storage in 2021.

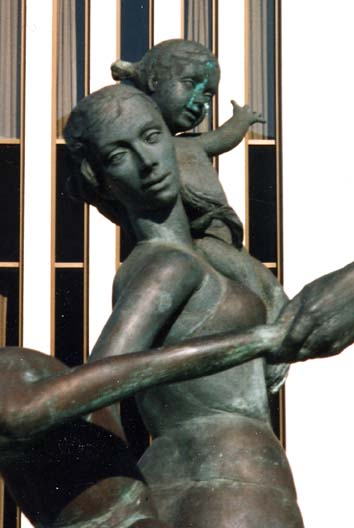
Close-up of mother

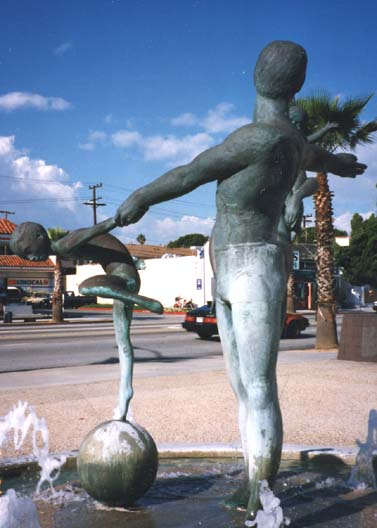
Father and son
