= Eino =

Estonian and Finnish male given name

- Gender: Male
- Languages: Finnish, Estonian
- Name day: 17 November

Origin
- Region of origin: Finland, Estonia

Other names
- Related names: Einar, Heinar

Eino is a Finnish and Estonian masculine given name. The name is thought to be the Finnic form of the given name Henri. Both Finnish and Estonian languages belong to the Finno-Ugric language group through their being Uralic languages. Another possible origin of the name is the German Enewald (Aginwald).

People with the given name Eino include:

- Eino Forsström (1889–1961), Finnish gymnast
- Eino Friberg (1901–1995), Finnish-American writer
- Eino Hanski (1928–2000), Swedish-Finnish-Russian-Karelian author, dramatist and sculptor
- Eino Heino (1912–1975), Finnish cinematographer
- Eino Rudolf Woldemar Holsti (1881–1945), Finnish politician, journalist and diplomat
- Antti Eino Juntumaa (born 1959), Finnish boxer
- Eino Jutikkala (1907–2006), Finnish historian
- Eino Ilmari Juutilainen (1914–1999), Finnish Air Force fighter pilot
- Eino Kaila (1890–1958), Finnish philosopher, critic and teacher
- Eino Kuvaja (1906–1975), Finnish skier and military commander
- Eino Kirjonen (1933–1988), Finnish ski jumper
- Eino-Endel Laas (1915–2009), Estonian forest scientist
- Eino Lehtinen (1900–2007), one of the last surviving veterans of the Finnish Civil War
- Eino Leino (1878–1926), Finnish poet and journalist
- Eino Leino (1891–1986), Finnish wrestler
- Eino Luukkanen (1909–1964), Finnish fighter ace
- Eino Oksanen (1931–2022), Finnish marathon runner
- Eino Olkinuora (1915–1941), Finnish cross country skier
- Eino Viljami Panula (1911–1912), Finnish boy who died during the sinking of the RMS Titanic
- Eino Penttilä (1906–1982), Finnish athlete
- Eino Puri (born 1988), Estonian football player
- Eino Purje (1900–1984), middle-distance runner
- Eino Rahja (1885–1936), Finnish-Russian politician
- Eino Railio (1886–1970), Finnish gymnast
- Eino S. Repo (1919–2002), Finnish journalist and politician
- Vilho Eino Ritola (1896–1982), Finnish long-distance runner
- Eino Saastamoinen (1887–1946), Finnish gymnast
- Eino Sandelin (1864–1937), Finnish sailor
- Eino Soinio (1894–1973), Finnish football player
- Kaarlo Eino Kyösti Soinio (1888–1960), Finnish gymnast and amateur football player
- Eino William Swan (1903–1940; better known as Einar Aaron Swan), American musician, arranger and composer
- Eino Tainio (1905–1970), Finnish politician
- Eino Tamberg (1930–2010), Estonian composer
- Eino Matti Toppinen (born 1975; better known as Eicca Toppinen), Finnish cellist, songwriter, producer and arranger
- Eino Uusitalo (1924–2015), Finnish politician
- Eino Virtanen (1908–1980), Finnish wrestler
