= Venice Heritage Museum =

History museum in Los Angeles, California

Coordinates: 33.9972°N 118.4782°W

The Venice Heritage Museum is a museum in the Venice neighborhood of Los Angeles, California, United States, which is dedicated to the beachside neighborhood's history. Dedicated to celebrating the town founded in 1905 by Abbott Kinney, it opened in its permanent location in March 2024.
