= Robert Symington Baker =

Early California settler, cofounder of Santa Monica (1826–1894)

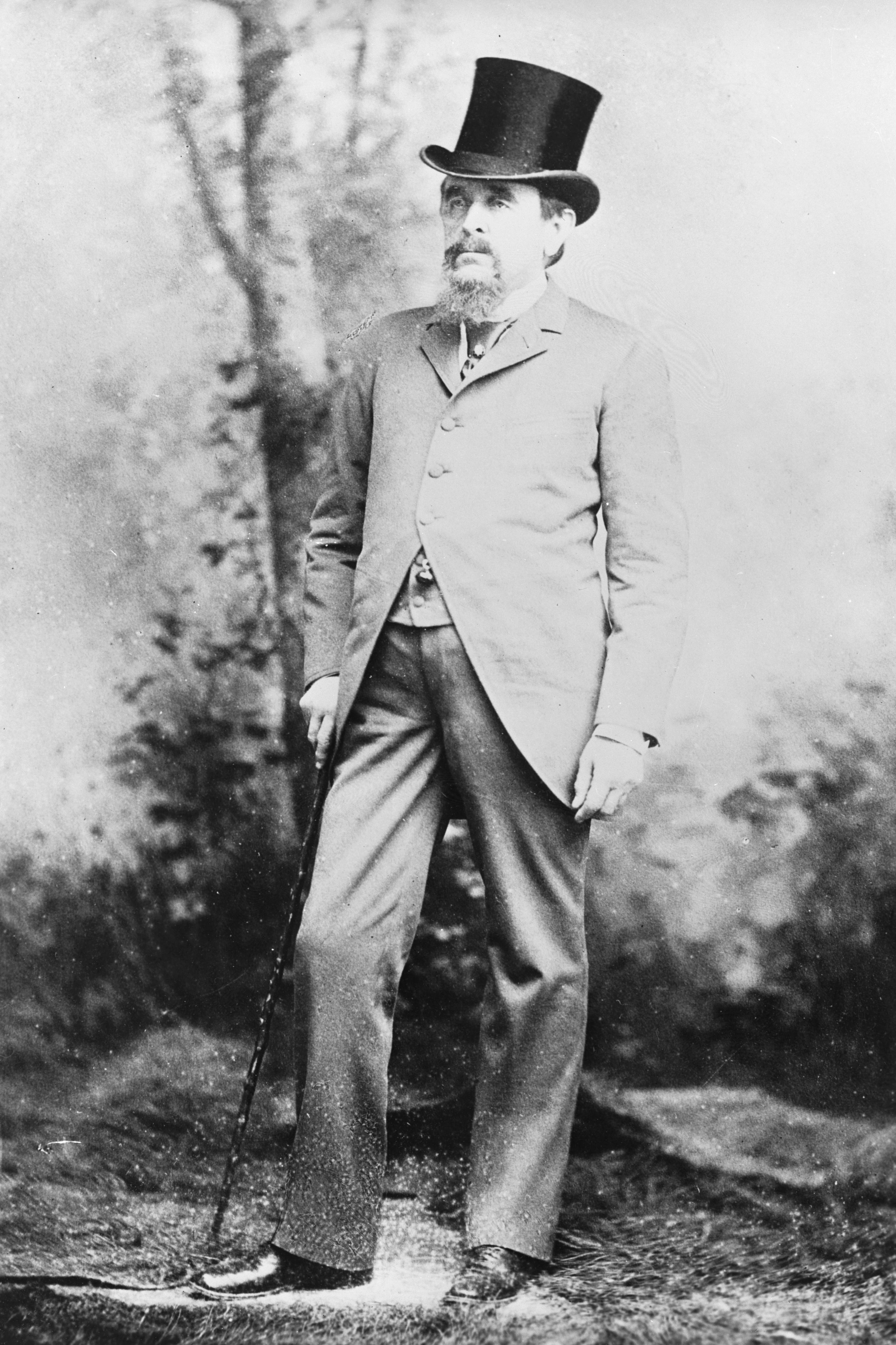
- Born: 1826
- Died: 1894

Colonel Robert Symington Baker (1826–1894) was a businessman and landowner from Rhode Island. He came to California in 1849 and engaged in mining supplies business, also as Cook and Baker in San Francisco, California. Later he became associated with General Beale in the cattle and sheep business in the northern part of the state and in the Tejon area.

== Career ==
In 1872, the Sepulvedas sold their Rancho San Vicente y Santa Monica property to Baker. With his purchase of the Rancho for cattle and sheep business, Baker moved to Los Angeles. In 1874 he married Arcadia Bandini de Stearns. The Bakers owned the 30,000-acre (120 km^{2}) property two years, and in 1874 sold a three quarter interest in the land to the Comstock millionaire John Percival Jones.

Jones and Baker decided to subdivide part of their joint holdings, and in 1875 they created the town of Santa Monica. Jones and Baker formed the Santa Monica Land and Water Company, one of the principal developers of western Los Angeles. In 1878, he built the Baker block in Los Angeles. Baker owned, through his wife, Rancho La Puente and Rancho La Laguna and had other large business interests.

He is interred at Calvary Cemetery, East Los Angeles.
