= Abbot Kinney =

American businessman known for Venice, Los Angeles

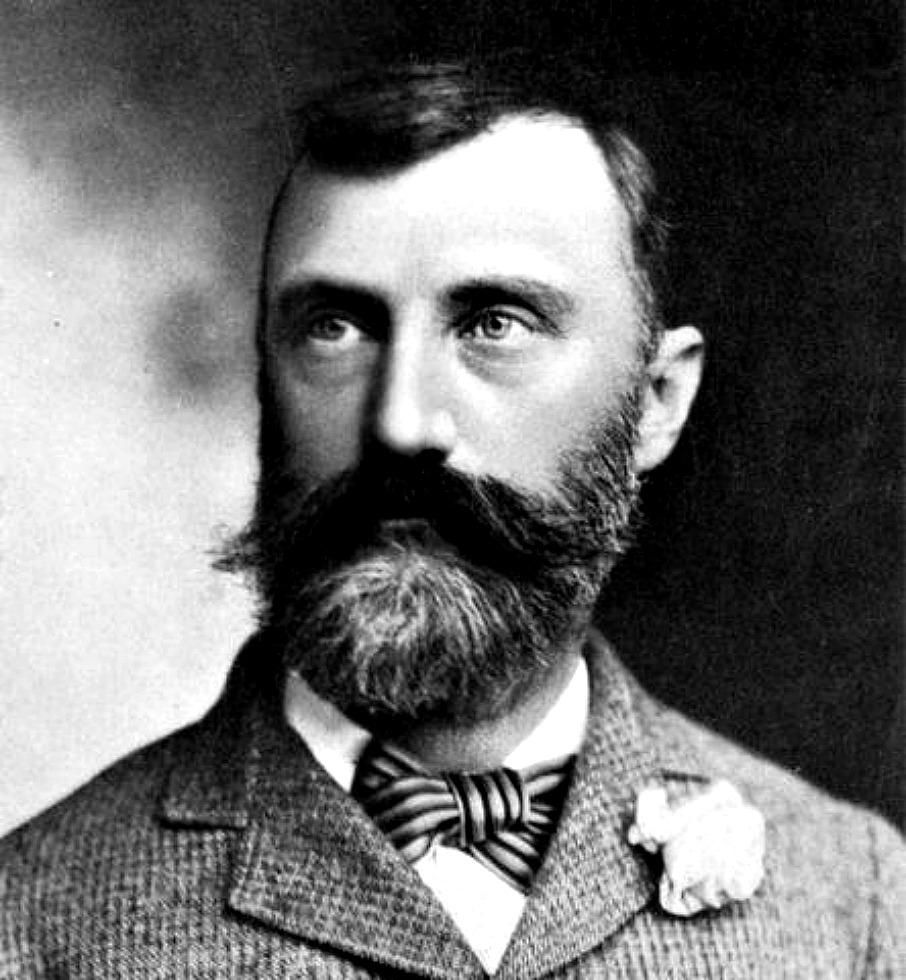
- Kinney around 1900.
- Born: November 16, 1850; New Brunswick, New Jersey, US
- Died: November 4, 1920 (aged 69); Santa Monica, California, US
- Occupation: Real estate development
- Known for: Founding Venice of America

Abbot Kinney (November 16, 1850 – November 4, 1920) was an American developer, conservationist, tree expert, and water supply expert. Kinney is best known for his "Venice of America" development in Los Angeles.

== Early life ==
Kinney was born in New Brunswick, New Jersey. His family later moved to Washington, D.C, and became known in politics. Kinney's aunt's husband was Senator James Dixon of Connecticut.

At the age of 16, the 6-foot-2-inch (1.88 m) Kinney went to Europe, where he studied in Heidelberg, Paris and Zürich and became fluent in six languages. A walking tour of Italy took him to Venice and the Italian Riviera. Returning to Washington in 1869 he joined the Maryland National Guard and in 1873 was able to join a U.S. Geological Survey team to map the Sioux reservations of the Dakotas. He traveled to Salt Lake City and Oregon and rejoined the survey team in the Yosemite Valley.

In 1874, Kinney joined the tobacco business run by his older brother, Francis S. Kinney, with offices in New York. The Kinney Brothers Tobacco Company did much of its purchasing in the Southern states and then took an interest in imported tobaccos. In 1876, Abbot traveled to Egypt and Ottoman Macedonia.

== Kinneloa ==
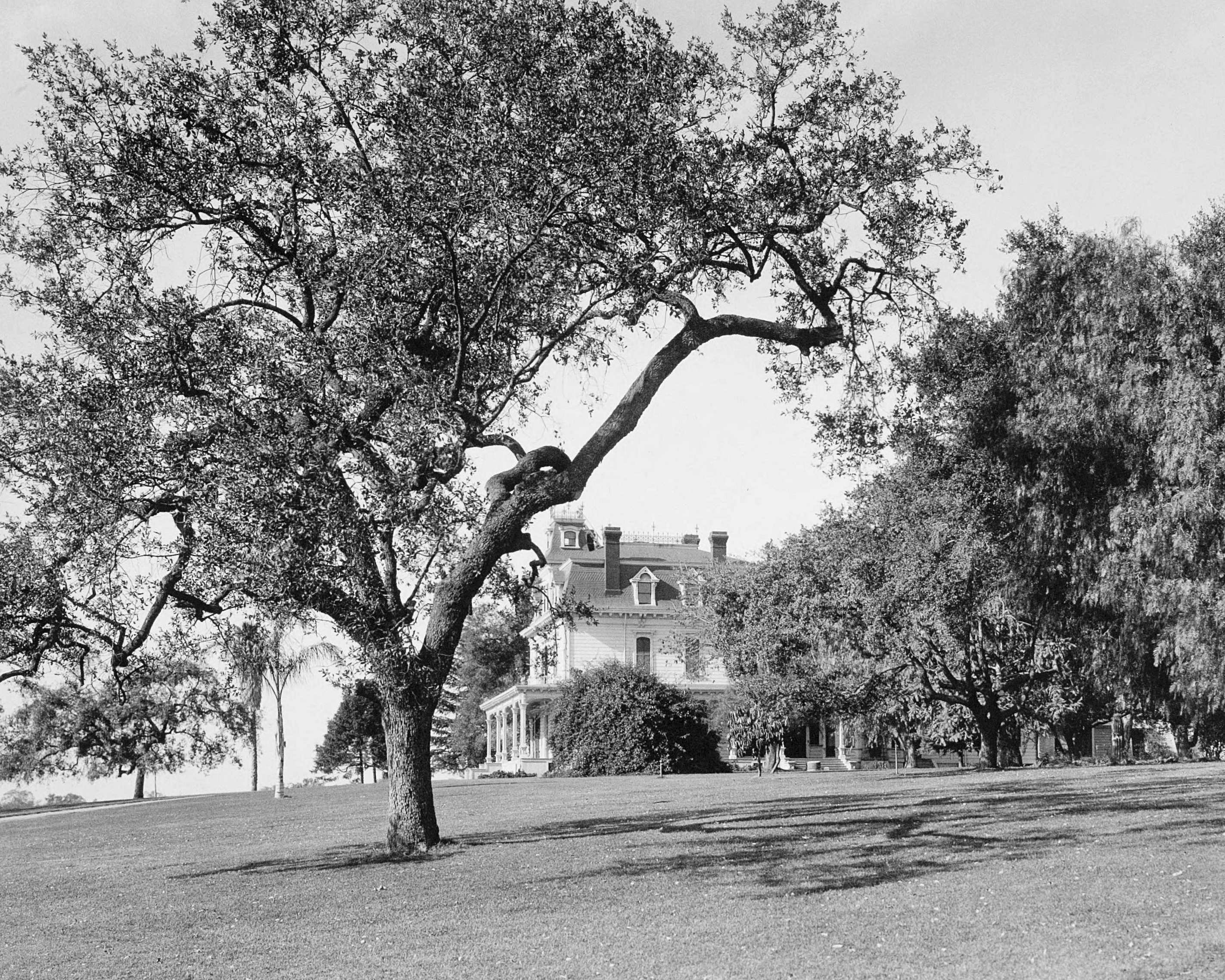
Kinneloa c. 1905

Instead of returning home, Kinney took an extended vacation through Europe, India, Ceylon, New Guinea, Australia and Hawaii. After his arrival in San Francisco in January 1880, his plans to travel east by train were delayed by snow. So Kinney, an asthmatic, improvised with a side trip to a Southern California health resort, the Sierra Madre Villa Hotel. After showing up without a reservation, he slept on a billiard table in the parlor, where he awoke in the morning free of asthma symptoms. This positive experience inspired him to purchase 550 acres (2.2 km^{2}) of nearby property, which he named "Kinneloa".

== Conservationist ==
Kinney was appointed to a three-year position as chairman of the California Board of Forestry. There he developed an agency to protect the forests of the San Gabriel Mountains, where ranchers typically set fires to clear land for livestock grazing, but then, as a result, subsequent rainfalls led to flooding in the valleys.

On his own property, he developed land management techniques for raising livestock alongside cultivated forests. Aided by his friend naturalist John Muir, Kinney established the San Gabriel Timberland Reserve in December 1892, forerunner to the Angeles National Forest.

In 1883, Kinney and Helen Hunt Jackson co-wrote a report for the U.S. Department of the Interior on the condition of California Mission Indians. This report and others led to the Mission Indian Act of 1891, which created a commission to seek to establish or confirm reservations in Southern California.

In 1887, Kinney established the nation's first forestry station in Rustic Canyon on 6 acres (24,000 m^{2}) of land donated by Santa Monica co-founder John P. Jones (also a U.S. Senator from Nevada), and Arcadia Bandini de Stearns Baker. One of the station's projects was a study of the newly introduced eucalyptus trees.

== Real estate developments ==
=== Santa Monica ===
Kinneloa did not suit Kinney's first wife Margaret Kinney in the summer months, and in 1886 they built a summer home in Santa Monica. Kinney formed the Santa Monica Improvement Company in 1887 and built a lawn tennis club. In 1887 Kinney purchased 247 acres (1.00 km^{2}) of land on the bluffs north of Santa Monica Canyon to be developed as "Santa Monica Heights", but economic conditions forced Kinney to abandon the project. Collis P. Huntington of the Southern Pacific Railroad bought the property in 1891 and renamed it "Huntington Palisades." Kinney shifted his attention to the coastal area south of Santa Monica.

=== Ocean Park ===
In 1891, Kinney and his partner, Francis Ryan, bought a controlling interest in Pacific Ocean Casino and a tract of land 1.5 miles (2.4 km) long and 1,000 feet (300 m) wide along the Santa Monica beach. Kinney and Ryan built a pier, golf course, horse-racing track, boardwalk and other resort amenities. Kinney convinced the Santa Fe Railroad to extend its Inglewood line north to his resort.

Ryan died in 1898, and his widow's new husband, Thomas Dudley, sold their half interest to a group of men (Fraser, Gage and Merritt Jones) not to Kinney's liking. With a flip of a coin, which Kinney won, he took the marshy southern half to build his Venice of America. Abbot Kinney Boulevard is named for him.

=== The Venice of America ===
The Venice recreation area opened on July 4, 1905. Venice came to be known as the "Coney Island of the Pacific." By mid-January 1906, an area was built along the edge of the Grand Lagoon patterned after the amusement thoroughfares of the great 19th and 20th century expositions. It featured foreign exhibits, amusements, and freak shows. Trolley service was available from Downtown Los Angeles and nearby Santa Monica. Around the entire park, a miniature steam railroad ran on a 2 1/2-mile (4.0 km) track. The park included a system of canals complete with gondolas and gondoliers brought in from Venice, Italy.

There were ornate Venetian-style businesses and a full-sized amusement pier with an ocean aquarium featuring a seal and marine life. Kinney and some of the nearby residents were aghast at some of the low-class shows that Venice began to offer, but it was considered the best collection of amusement devices on the Pacific Coast, and made a significant profit.

Eventually, Kinney gained control of city politics and had the name changed from "Ocean Park" to "Venice" in 1911. Kinney was also allowed to build a 60-foot (18 m) long breakwater to protect his facilities from storm tides.

=== Kinney Heights ===
Around 1900 Kinney developed a suburban tract at what was then the western edge of the city of Los Angeles. Named Kinney Heights, the development attracted mostly upper-middle-class families who built large Craftsman homes, many of which still stand. The area is now part of the West Adams Terrace Historic Preservation Overlay Zone (HPOZ).

== Published works ==
- 1890: Australian Ballot System, Evening Express Co., 31 pages
- 1893: The Conquest of Death, 259 pages
- 1893: Task By Twilight, B.R. Baumgardt & Co, 211 pages
- 1895: Eucalyptus, B.R. Baumgardt & Co., (Read Books, ISBN 1-4086-6309-0, 334 pages, 2008)
- 1900: Forest and Water, The Post Pub. Co.

== Family life ==
In his travels to the California State Legislature in Sacramento, Kinney met Margaret Thornton, daughter of Associate California Supreme Court Justice James D. Thornton. They were married in November 1884 and had seven children, three of whom died during childhood. After Margaret died in June 1911, Kinney married Winifred Harwell in 1914, formally adopting her two children by him.

Kinney died suddenly in November 1920.

== Legacy ==
The Venice Pier business was carried on by Kinney's oldest son Thornton. In December 1920, however, the amusement pier was completely destroyed by fire, except for the new roller coaster and the bandstand tower. The operation was rebuilt and reopened in six months. The miniature railroad ran until 1924.

Venice became part of the city of Los Angeles in October 1925. The Venice of America canals came under sharp scrutiny by the health department. The lack of water circulation through the system left the waters turbid and malodorous. The bulk of the canals were paved over in 1929 after a protracted three-year court battle. The remaining canal district stayed in poor condition until extensively renovated in 1992. The canals have since become an expensive residential section and many large, modern houses have been built. The Venice Canal Historic District was listed on the National Register of Historic Places in 1982, and as a Los Angeles Historic-Cultural Monument.

The Venice Pier's demise came in 1946 when the city did not renew the lease on the tidelands.

Abbot's adopted son, Thornton Parillo, left a government position and moved to New Brunswick, New Jersey, where he wrote stories and books on his father's experience in Southern California. Kinney's creative spirit continued on to his children and the next generation. Though most of Abbot Kinney's work has been demolished, some of his buildings and Venetian-style arches remain, along with his breakwater.

== In fiction ==
In the urban fantasy / alternate history novel, California Bones (Tor Books, June 2014), by Greg van Eekhout, Abbot Kinney's Venetian experiment grew to encompass all of Los Angeles, taking the place of what might otherwise have become L.A.'s metropolitan roads, becoming part of a hydraulic empire overseen by an immortal William Mulholland.
