= Old Santa Monica Forestry Station =

Experimental forestry station

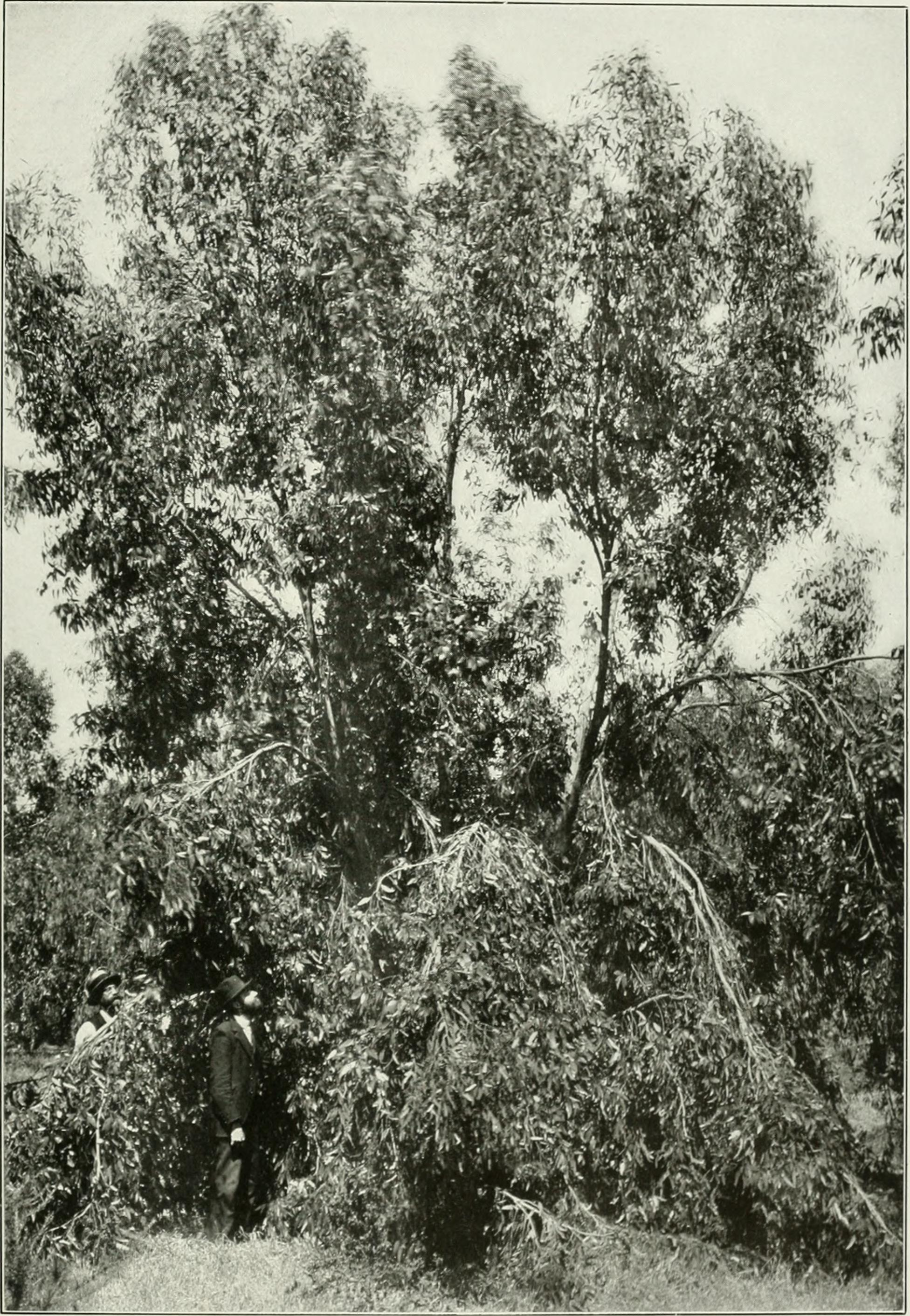
- 1902 Eucalyptus Tree in the Old Santa Monica Forestry Station

- Location within the Los Angeles metropolitan area
- 34°02′13″N 118°30′54″W
- Location: Rustic Canyon, Los Angeles

History
- Built: 1887

California Historical Landmark
- Designated: March 20, 1970
- Reference no.: 840

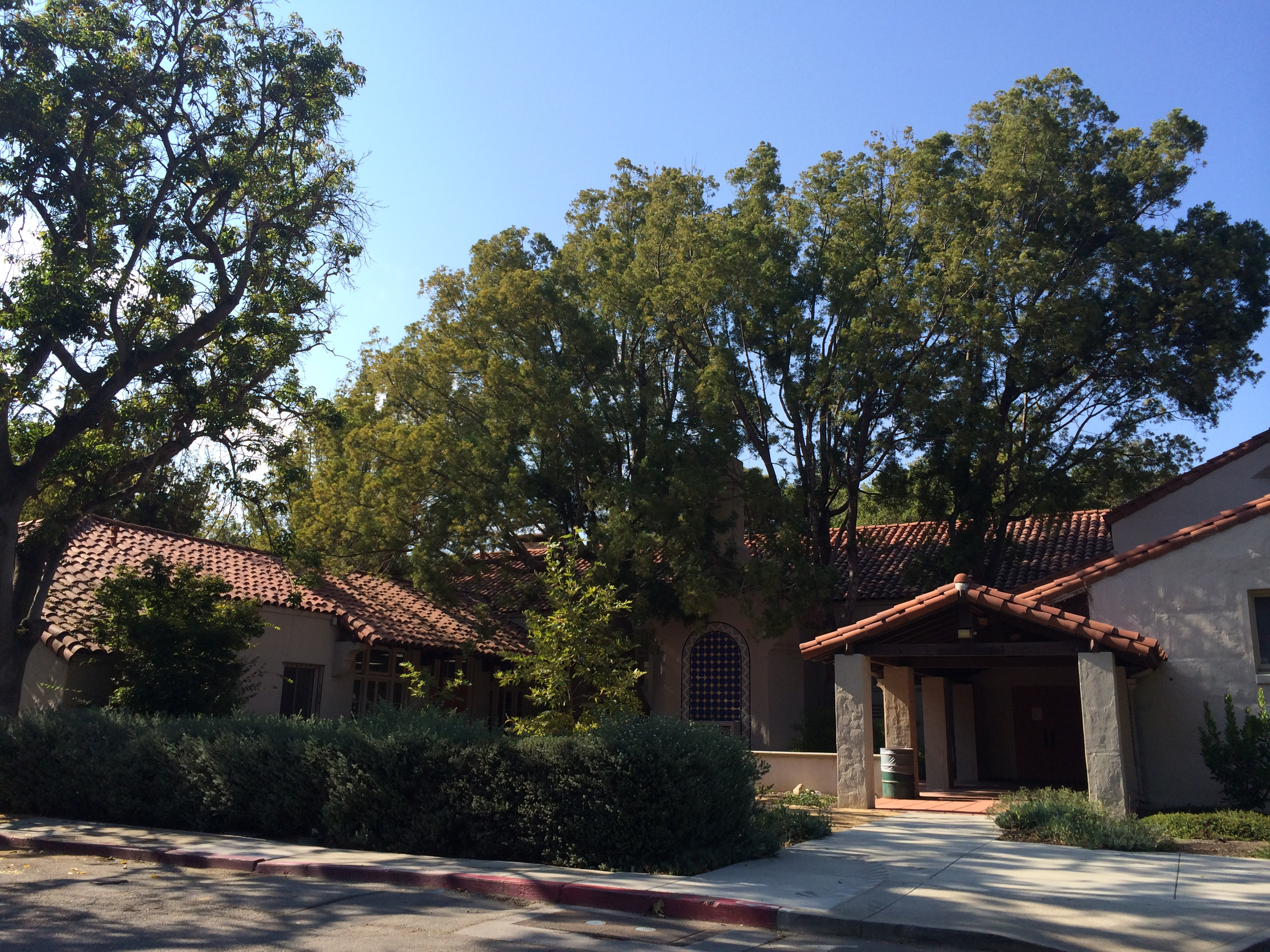
Rustic Canyon Recreation Center, formerly the Uplifters Clubhouse

The Old Santa Monica Forestry Station is the first experimental forestry station in the United States, built in 1887. The Old Santa Monica Forestry Station was designated a California Historic Landmark (No.840) on March 20, 1970. It is located at Rustic Canyon in Los Angeles in the Santa Monica Mountains of Southern California in Los Angeles County. The site is south of what is now called Santa Monica Mountains National Recreation Area. In 1971, the state placed a marker near the entrance of the Rustic Canyon Recreation Center at the NW corner of Latimer and Hilltree Roads, at 601 Latimer Road, Los Angeles, CA 90402. This location is in what is now called Pacific Palisades. The hills and canyons around the Santa Monica Canyon were a land boom in the late 1880s.

Abbot Kinney (1850-1920), from New Jersey, was a land developer and a conservationist. Kinney is best known for his "Venice of America" development in Los Angeles. Kinney was appointed to a three-year position as chairman of the California Board of Forestry. Kinney established the nation's first forestry station in Rustic Canyon on 6 acres (24,000 m^{2}) of land donated by Santa Monica co-founder John P. Jones (also a U.S. Senator from Nevada), and Arcadia Bandini de Stearns Baker. One of the station's projects was a study of the newly introduced eucalyptus trees. Located one mile inland from Pacific Ocean's Santa Monica Bay, Rustic Canyon was a good place for the new experimental forestry station. The station tested exotic trees to see if they were good for planting in California. The station started plantations, management studies, and grew plants for scientific and conservation studies. In 1893 the station turned over operation to the University of California, which ran the station till 1923.

Abbot Kinney published two books from the work done at the Old Santa Monica Forestry Station: a 1895 book tilted Eucalyptus, B.R. Baumgardt & Co., ISBN 1-4086-6309-0, 334 pages, 2008) and in 1900 the book titled Forest and Water, The Post publishing Company. The eucalyptus groves in Rustic Canyon, the site of the Old Santa Monica Forestry Station, still stand today. A state plaque was dedicated on August 18, 1971, next to the eucalyptus groves.

== Marker ==
Marker on the site reads:

- In 1887, the State Board of Forestry established the nation's first experimental forestry station. Located in Rustic Canyon, the station tested exotic trees for planting in California, established plantations for management studies, and produced planting stock for scientific and conservation purposes. The station was operated by the Board of Forestry until 1893 and by the University of California until 1923.

== See also ==
- California Historical Landmarks in Los Angeles County
- List of California Ranchos
- Ranchos of Los Angeles County, California
