= Rustic Canyon, Los Angeles =

Neighborhood in Los Angeles, California, United States

Coordinates: 34.0383°N 118.5148°W

Rustic Canyon is an urban, residential neighborhood and canyon in eastern Pacific Palisades, on the west side of Los Angeles, California. It is along Rustic Creek, in the foothills of the Santa Monica Mountains.

== Geography ==
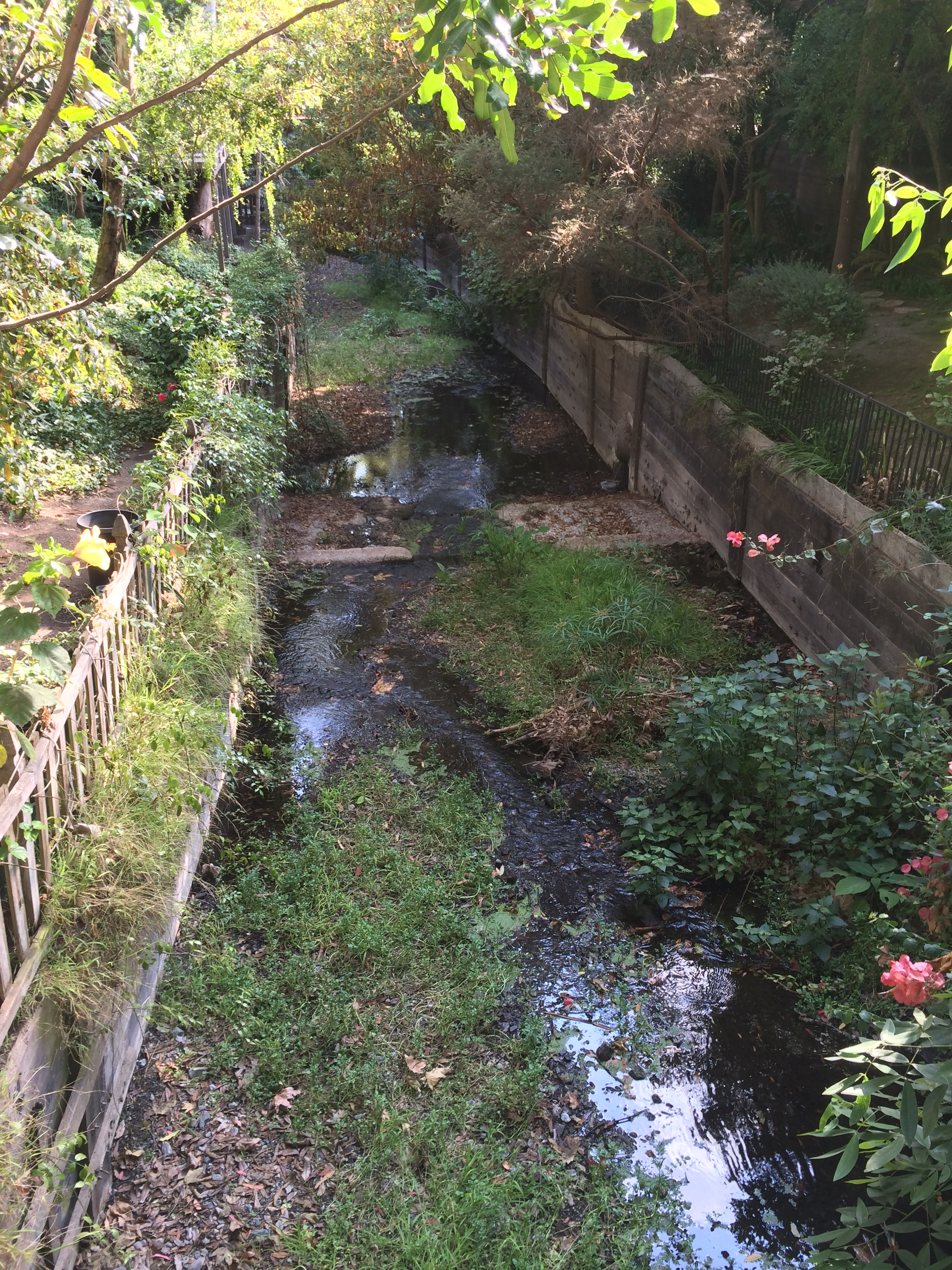
Rustic Creek

The residential neighborhood is bordered approximately by Sunset Boulevard to the north, Chautauqua Boulevard to the west, lower Santa Monica Canyon to the south, and Amalfi Drive and Mesa Road to the east. The neighborhood is between the main section of Pacific Palisades and the Brentwood neighborhoods of Los Angeles, and the Santa Monica Canyon neighborhood of Santa Monica. It is distinctly isolated by its canyon geography and narrow streets. The canyon and creek, with less development, run north of Sunset Boulevard past Will Rogers State Historic Park, and into natural habitat within Topanga State Park.

Rustic Canyon and Santa Monica Canyon are the southernmost of a series of coast-facing canyons which cut into the Santa Monica Mountains from Pacific Palisades through Malibu. Rustic Creek is one of the few in developed Los Angeles not in a concrete storm channel, until its confluence with Santa Monica Creek which flows into nearby Santa Monica Bay. The area is heavily wooded and lush with vegetation, including coast live oaks, California sycamores, various species of Eucalyptus, and many ornamental trees.

The narrow canyon has a cooler and slightly more humid microclimate than most other areas of Los Angeles. Coastal fog is common throughout the year, winter lows rarely drop below 35 °F, and summer highs rarely exceed 80 °F. Due to its humid climate and the surrounding dense suburban development, the canyon is less threatened by wildfires than other communities within and adjacent to the Santa Monica Mountains.

The buildings in the canyon are within the 90272 ZIP Code of Pacific Palisades or the 90402 of Santa Monica, though all are within the City of Los Angeles.

== History ==
The original inhabitants of the area were the indigenous Tongva people (after 1771 referred to by the Spanish missionaries as "Gabrieleño" because they were in the jurisdiction of Mission San Gabriel). The first Europeans to visit the area were members of the Portola expedition of 1769. The expedition sought to follow the coastline, but were stopped by the coastal cliffs of the Santa Monica Mountains. The next day they turned around and went inland, finding a way north through Sepulveda Canyon.

Under Mexican rule, the land between Topanga Canyon and present day Santa Monica was in the Rancho Boca de Santa Monica. It was used for grazing and firewood by the prominent Marquez, Reyes, and Sepúlveda families. During the latter 19th-century, the canyon was known as a camping area and rustic retreat near the beach hotels and resorts of nearby Santa Monica.

Abbot Kinney, the developer known for founding the nearby community of Venice Beach to the south, established an experimental forestry station and planted eucalyptus trees in the lower canyon, which still remain. In the late 19th century, the mouth of the canyon was considered as a site for the Port of Los Angeles, however San Pedro Bay was used.

=== Uplifters ===
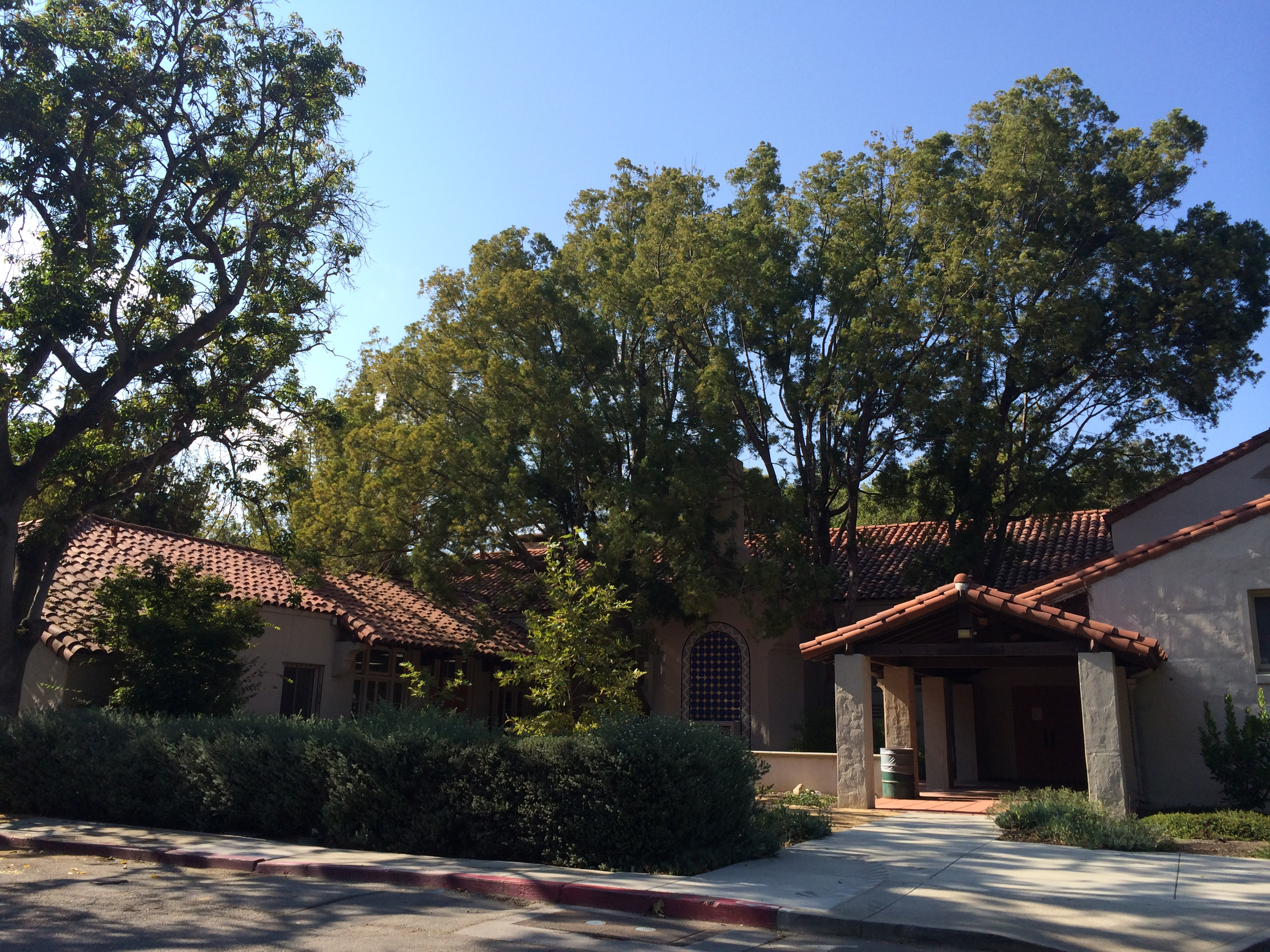
Rustic Canyon Recreation Center, formerly the Uplifters Clubhouse

During the early 20th century, the Uplifters, an offshoot of the prominent Los Angeles Athletic Club, established a social club and ranch in Rustic Canyon and built many ranch and cabin style houses as second homes for weekend and annual retreats. The Uplifters later developed a relationship with Will Rogers, whose ranch and estate lay on the other (north) side of Sunset Boulevard, and built a polo field in the canyon. During the Prohibition era, the Uplifters was known as a high-class drinking club, of which many prominent local politicians and wealthy residents of the city were members. The relative isolation of the area provided an ideal retreat for the wealthy and powerful members of the club, who lived primarily in the upscale areas (of the time) near downtown and in Pasadena to indulge their appetites without undue notice.

A sign reading "Uplifters Ranch" hangs over Latimer Road near the former Uplifters clubhouse, which was designed by the architect William J. Dodd. Following the Depression the club began to sell off its land in the area, and disbanded in 1947. The clubhouse and adjacent recreational elements, including a swimming pool, baseball diamond, and tennis courts, were donated to the city in the early 1950s. They are now within the Rustic Canyon Recreation Center city park.

== Police service ==
Los Angeles Police Department operates the West Los Angeles Community Police Station at 1663 Butler Avenue, 90025, which serves the neighborhood.

== Real estate ==
The neighborhood is composed almost entirely of single-family homes, and is without commercial development. The nearest commercial buildings are in lower Santa Monica Canyon at Pacific Coast Highway, and consist of several shops, bars, restaurants, and a gas station.

=== Residences ===
Residences designed by Lloyd Wright, Richard Neutra, Craig Ellwood, Ray Kappe, Moore Ruble Yudell, Marmol Radziner and other prominent architects are located in the canyon.

=== Development conflicts ===
Rustic Canyon has long been a site of conflict between real estate developers and local residents. Local legends from the 1930s tell of residents staging displays of chasing each other with kitchen knives down the street to scare away real-estate agents. In more recent times, such conflicts have resulted in long legal battles. The wealthy and prominent residents of the neighborhood have demonstrated both the budget and access to the legal system necessary to block unwanted developments.

During the 1980s Steve Tisch, a film producer and Loews Hotels heir, fought a five-year battle against local residents for expanding his large property to include a private right of way, and eventually lost the case.

Setback encroachment

Beginning in 2001, a long-running and complicated legal battle in the canyon at Brooktree and Greentree Roads has questioned a 14 feet (4.3 m) setback encroachment by the owners, raised allegations of corruption within the city of Los Angeles' Building and Safety Department, and as of 2013 remained unresolved. The owners had erroneously calculated the required front yard setback. If a final ruling is ever reached enforcing the setback, the addition's encroachment would need demolition and removal. In September 2007 a judge ruled that the new addition to the Beglari residence was 14 feet (4.3 m) over the setback requirement and closer to the Greentree Road than permitted by the Los Angeles Municipal Code's zoning law. Even though judges have ruled: the use of invalid building permits for the nonconforming addition; and a post-construction occupancy permit being improperly granted; the owners have fought to maintain their non-compliant house for over 12 years. Still without definitive resolution or demolition, another unsuccessful appeal was filed by the owners in 2013.

== See also ==
- Will Rogers State Beach
- Will Rogers State Historic Park
- Topanga State Park—natural upper Rustic Canyon and Rustic Creek
