= Abbot Kinney Boulevard =

Street in Venice, California, US

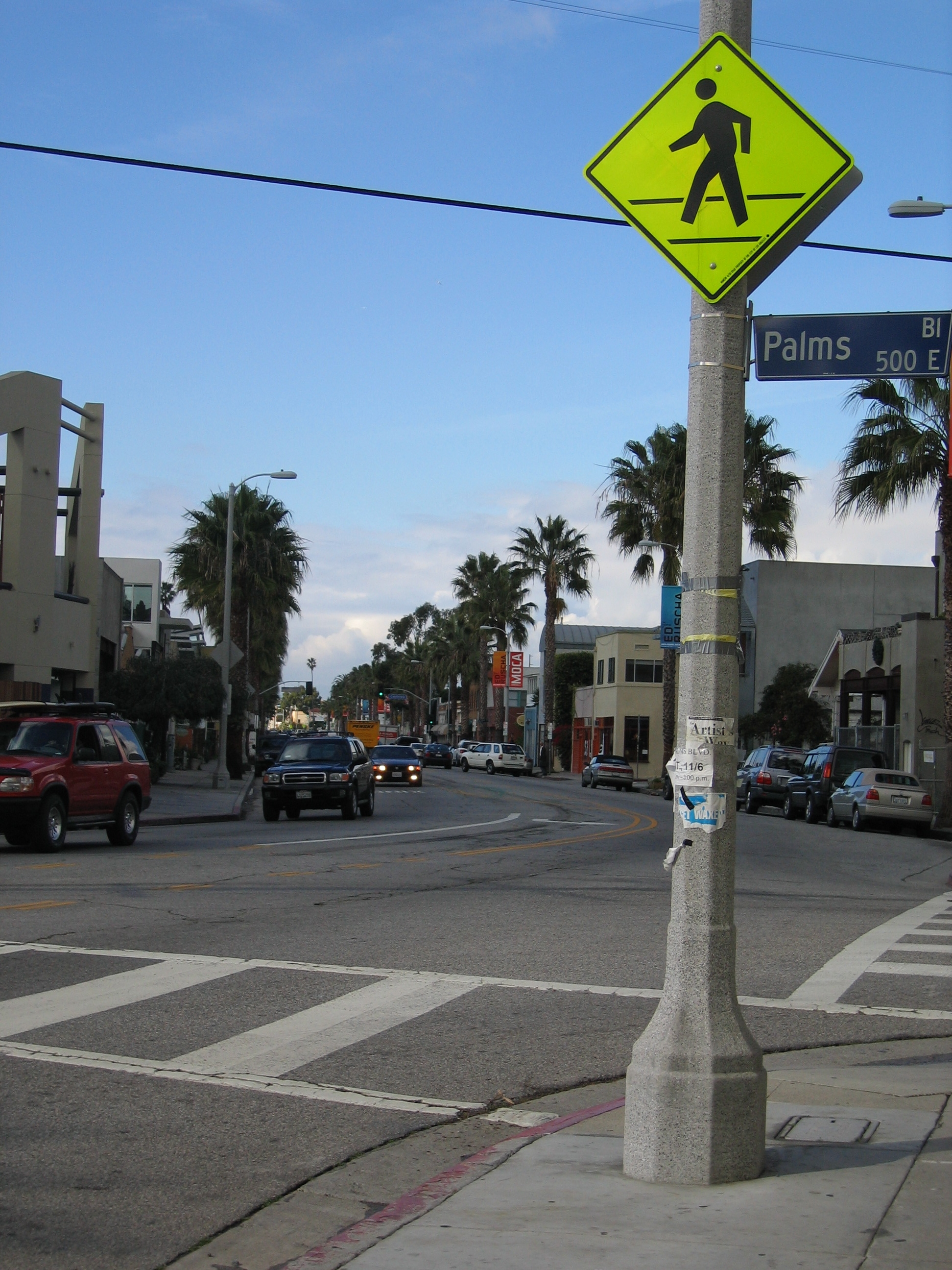
Looking down Abbot Kinney Blvd. (2004)

Abbot Kinney Boulevard is a mile-long road containing many shops and galleries located in the southern part of Venice, Los Angeles, California. It stretches from Washington Boulevard to Main Street, and its namesake is Abbot Kinney, a 19th century real estate developer and conservationist.

Until 1991, the street was commonly known as "West Washington Blvd."

== Art on Abbot Kinney ==
Venice is well-known for its art scene and creative culture. Several outdoor murals are located around Abbot Kinney. One of the most famous artworks is the "Touch of Venice" mural which is located on Windward Avenue. Its location, on Windward, near Abbott Kinney, is in the 1958 film "Touch of Evil" by Orson Welles. It is 102 feet by 50 feet and was created by artist Jonas Never. Jonas Never designed the mural similarly to the opening scene of "Touch of Evil" instead of painting it like a photograph.

So Far So Good is a popular painting on an exterior building of a boutique on Abbot Kinney Boulevard. The painting was commissioned by Marcus Wainwright and David Neville from New York based brand Rag & Bone. The painting was created by Alex Yanes.

== Attractions and activities ==
The Boardwalk, also known as the Venice Ocean Front Walk, offers a variety of shops, restaurants, street performers, and artists. The Venice Breakwater was built by Abbot Kinney in 1905. Its purpose is to protect the amusement pier.

== Film and entertainment ==
Abbot Kinney Boulevard is a popular area for film shoots and other entertainment purposes. Commercials, television shows, and movies are filmed on Abbot Kinney Boulevard. Popular works include the television series Flaked and Californication, and films such as Chef, starring actresses Sofía Vergara and Scarlett Johansson. The Other Venice Film Festival occurs every year where The Abbot Awards are given to filmmakers who create poignant and alternative cinema. The award show also honors the founding father, Abbot Kinney, and it is a weekend long celebration. The films are made with lower budgets and less technological advancements compared to other companies.

== Celebrities ==
The neighborhood in Venice, California, is home to many Hollywood actors. Robert Downey Jr. kept an apartment on the boardwalk during the 1990s and Jim Morrison lived in Venice for two years. Other well-known residents include Julia Roberts, Kate Beckinsale, Nicolas Cage, Mark Valley, as well as photographer Lauren Greenfield.
