= Western Heights, Los Angeles =

Western Heights
- Neighborhood of Los Angeles
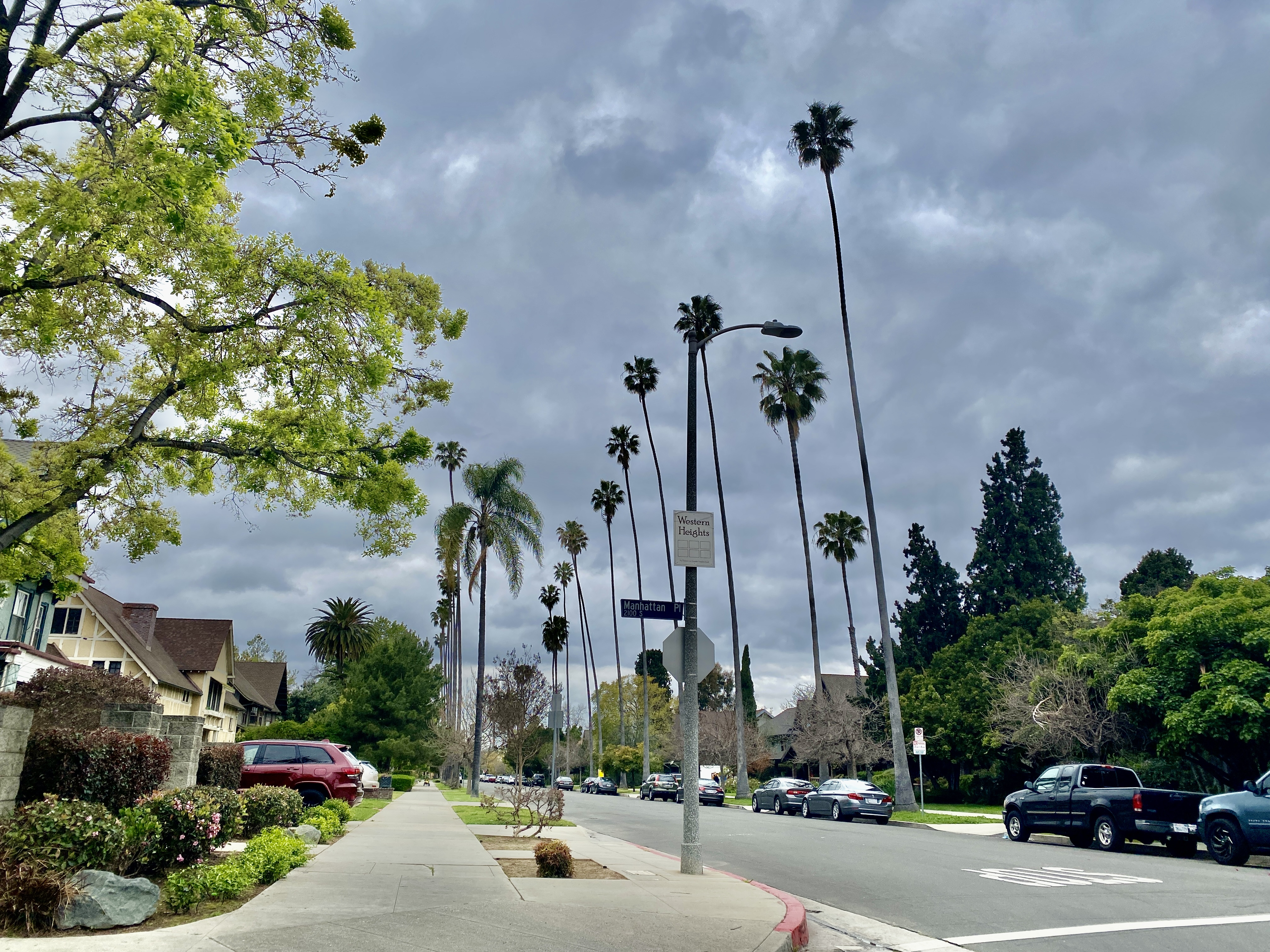
- View of 20th street in Western Heights

- Location within Los Angeles
- Coordinates: 34.0389°N 118.3132°W
- Country: United States of America
- State: California
- County: Los Angeles
- Time zone: Pacific
- Zip Code: 90018
- Area code: Area code 323

Western Heights is a neighborhood in Central Los Angeles, California. It contains one Los Angeles Historic-Cultural Monument.

== History ==
According to the Los Angeles Times, Western Heights began development in 1903 or '04 and was well established by World War 1 . In the 1920s, some of the area's wealthier residents began to move further west to Beverly Hills.

The original subdivisions that composed Western Heights were: the "Orange Crest Tract", the "West Garfield Heights Tract", the "Garfield Heights Tract", the "Florence Heights Tract", the "Kinney Heights Tract", the "Belevdere Heights Tract" and the "Western Heights Tract". Neighborhood residences were constructed in several architectural styles, including Craftsman, American Foursquare, Tudor Revival, Colonial Revival, Monterey Revival, Mediterranean Revival, Spanish Colonial Revival, and Mission. Architects included Paul Williams and John C. Austin.

In 1993, the Western Heights Neighborhood Association received a $10,000 in grants from Sears Savings Bank for security improvements and beautification projects.

In 1998, the Western Heights Neighborhood Association appealed the city's approval of a wireless telecommunication facility located at 2362 West Washington Boulevard. The city denied the association's appeal and instead issued the applicant a conditional permit requiring the structure's windows and ornamental detail to be painted, the brick exterior to remain exposed, and the roof to be cleaned.

In 2000, a City Council Motion sponsored by council members Mike Hernandez and Mark Ridley-Thomas initiated proceedings to establish a Western Heights Historic Preservation Overlay Zone(HPOZ). It was approved the following year.

== Geography ==
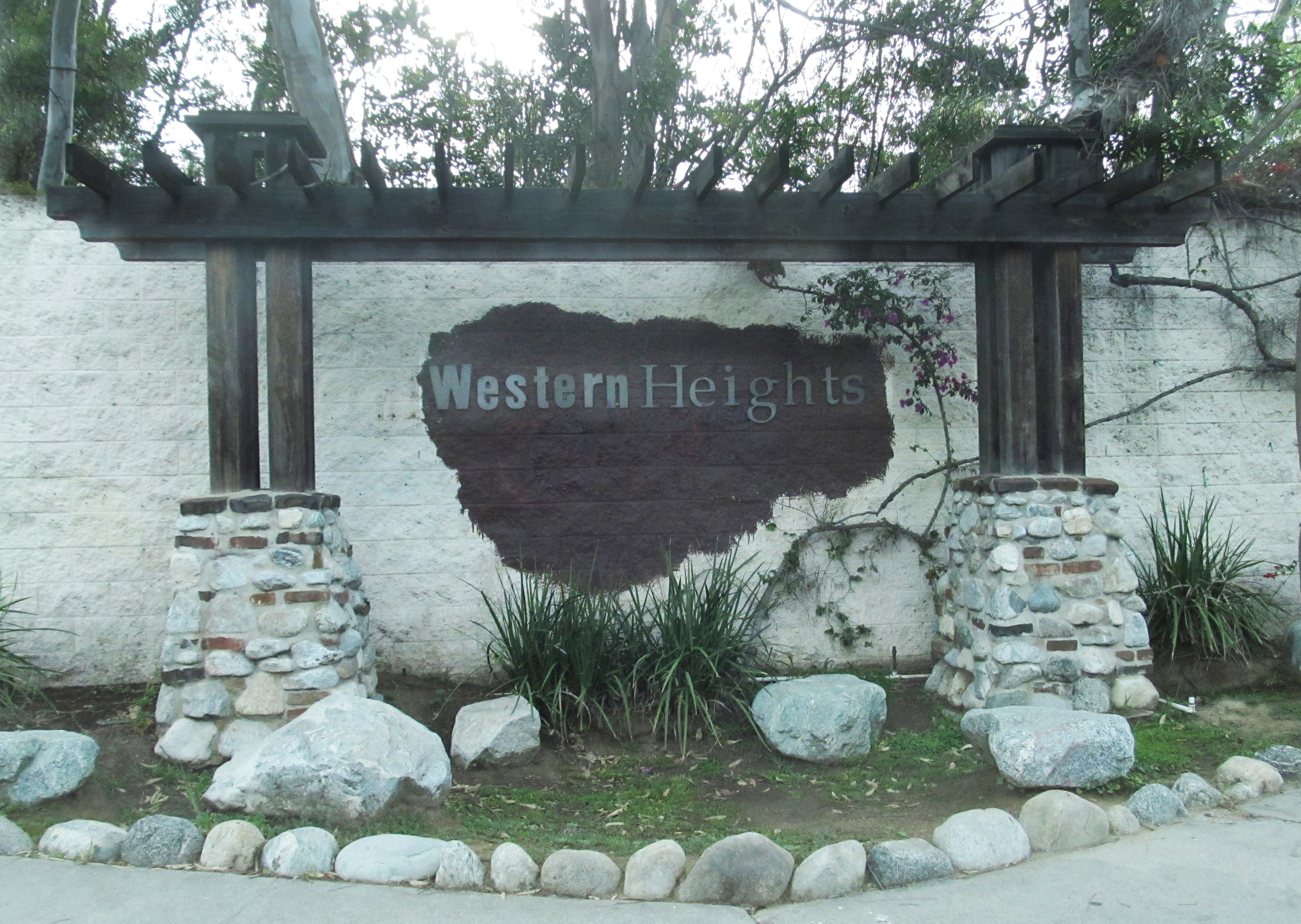
Western Heights Signage at Gramercy Place and 21st Street

The Western Heights neighborhood is bounded by Western Avenue on the east, Washington Boulevard on the north, Arlington on the west and the Santa Monica Freeway on the South.

In 2005, due to the proximity of Western Heights to the Santa Monica Freeway and large arterial streets, city council authorized the Western Heights Neighborhood Association, at its own cost, to install landscaped traffic barriers to reduce unsafe cut-through vehicular traffic. The motion was amended in 2010 and noted the street closures located as: 20th Street at Manhattan Place (full closure on eastern side of the intersection), 20th Street at Arlington (partial closure on eastern side of the intersection), and 21st Street at Arlington (partial closure on eastern side of the intersection).

== Historic Preservation Overlay Zone ==
On November 14, 2000, the city's Planning and Land Use Management Committee considered establishing a Historic Preservation Overlay Zone for the Western Heights Area.

The Western Heights HPOZ survey identified approximately 138 neighborhood parcels of which 117 were identified as "contributing" (defined as structures which add to the historical content) and 21 were identified as "non-contributing" resources. Because of the high concentration (approx. 84%) of contributing resources, the neighborhood met the definition of a "Preservation Zone" as "any area of the City of Los Angeles containing structures, landscaping, natural features or sites having historic, architectural, cultural or aesthetic significance ... "

Initially, the HPOZ area was to include the commercial structures along Washington Boulevard and Western Avenue. Some of the structures are in the architectural style of Streamline Moderne or 1920s Commercial/Utilitarian. Per city staff recommendation, the commercial properties along the two thoroughfares were excluded from the HPOZ as most of them were "non-contributing" structures.

On June 13, 2001, the HPOZ was approved.

== Education ==
Western Heights is zoned to schools in the Los Angeles USD:

- 24th Street Elementary School
- Pio Pico Elementary and Middle School
- Los Angeles High School

== Notable locations ==
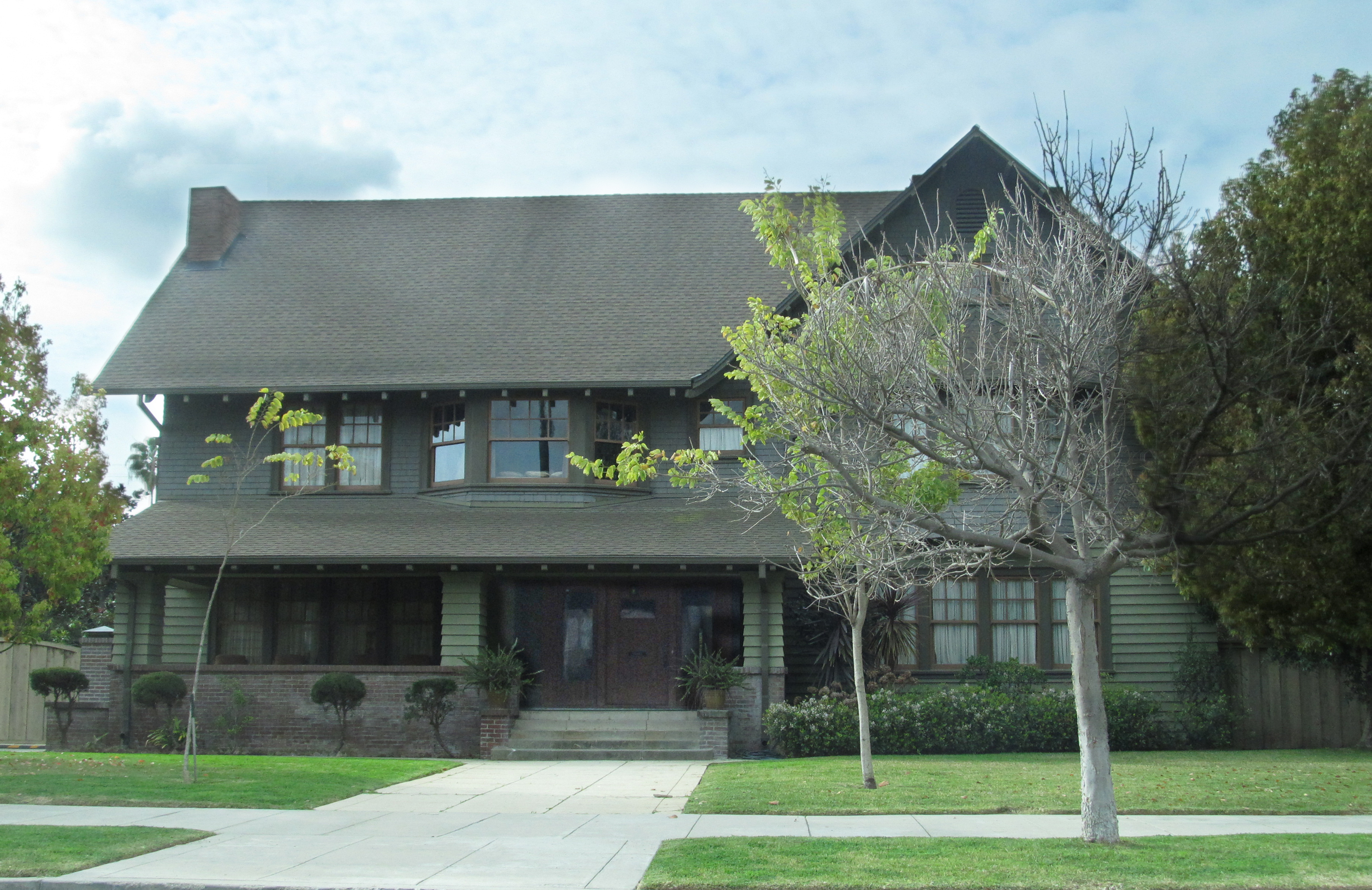
Kissam House Historic-Cultural Monument No. 761

- 2101 South Gramercy Place - Home purchased by Marvin Gaye in 1975.
- 2160 W. 20th Street - Built in 1907, the Kissam House is LA Historic-Cultural Monument No. 761.

== In media ==
Filming locations in Western Heights include:

- 2299 W. 20th Street - The location for the 1984 Twisted Sister music video for We’re Not Gonna Take It.
- 2151 W. 20th Street - The Zeta Alpha Zeta sorority house from the 2008 comedy House Bunny.
- 2179 W. 20th Street - Seth Rogen's home in the 2014 comedy Neighbors.
- 2203 W. 20th Street - Zac Efron's home in the 2014 comedy Neighbors.
- 2233 W. 21st Street - Home of Lucy Hale in the 2018 horror film Truth or Dare.
