= Don Abel Stearns House =

Coordinates: 34.0558483°N 118.2399525°W

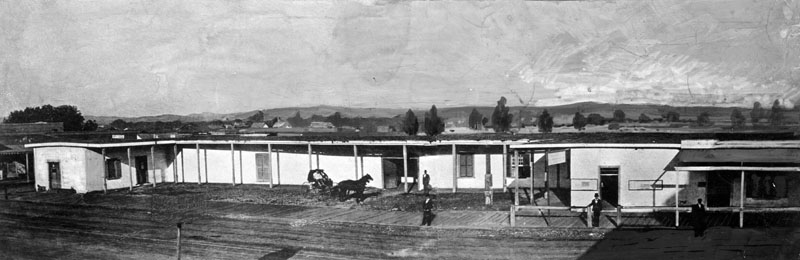
Abel Sterns adobe c.1857

Don Abel Stearns House (El Palacio) was located in Los Angeles, California, US. His home was at the southeast corner of Main and Arcadia streets. Here he built a substantial, wide spreading adobe surrounding a large courtyard. The house was a one-story adobe, and covered the entire ground occupied by the block, with an extensive "patio" or inner court in the center. When the outer gates were closed, this was a citadel capable of withstanding a siege.

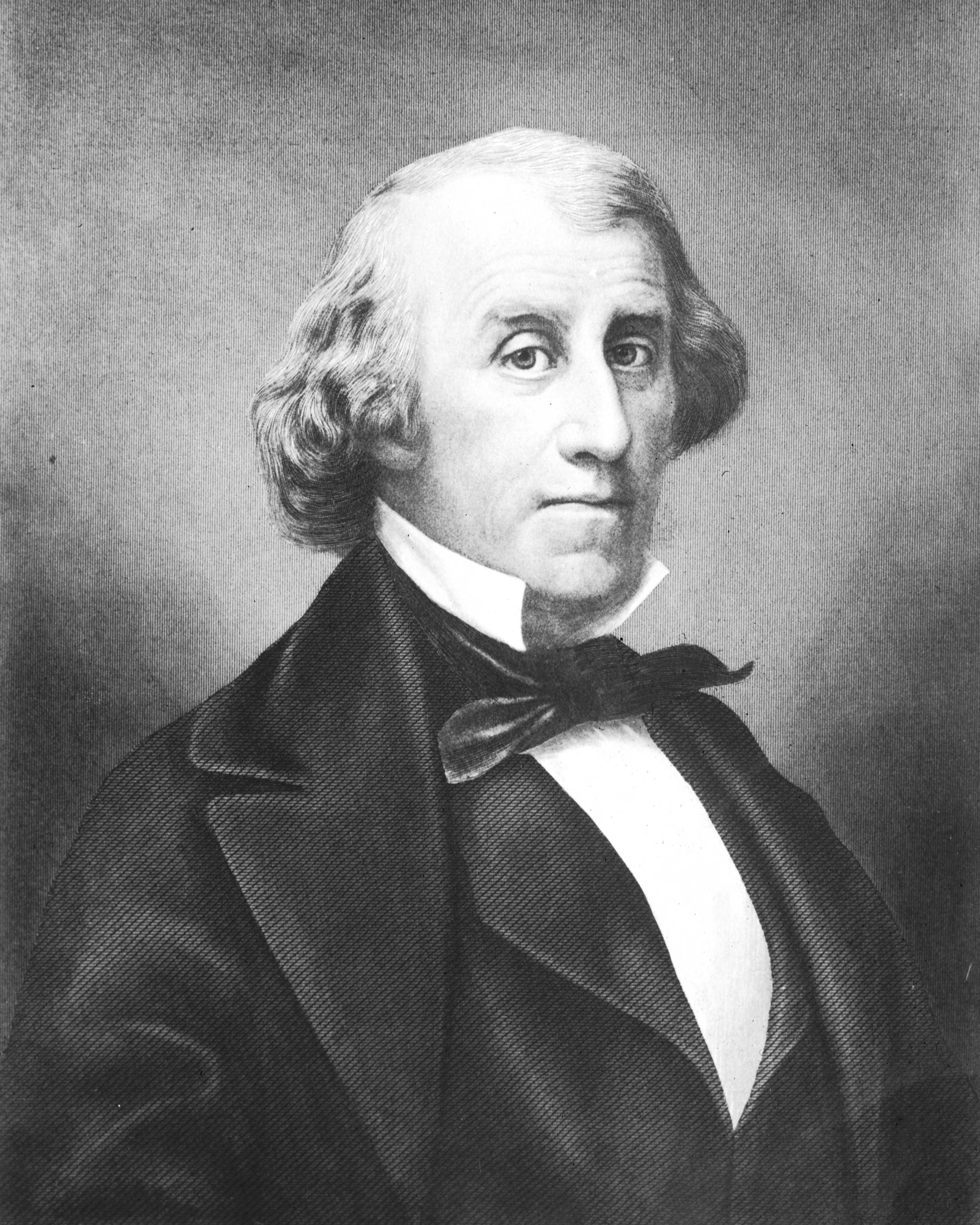
Abel Stearns

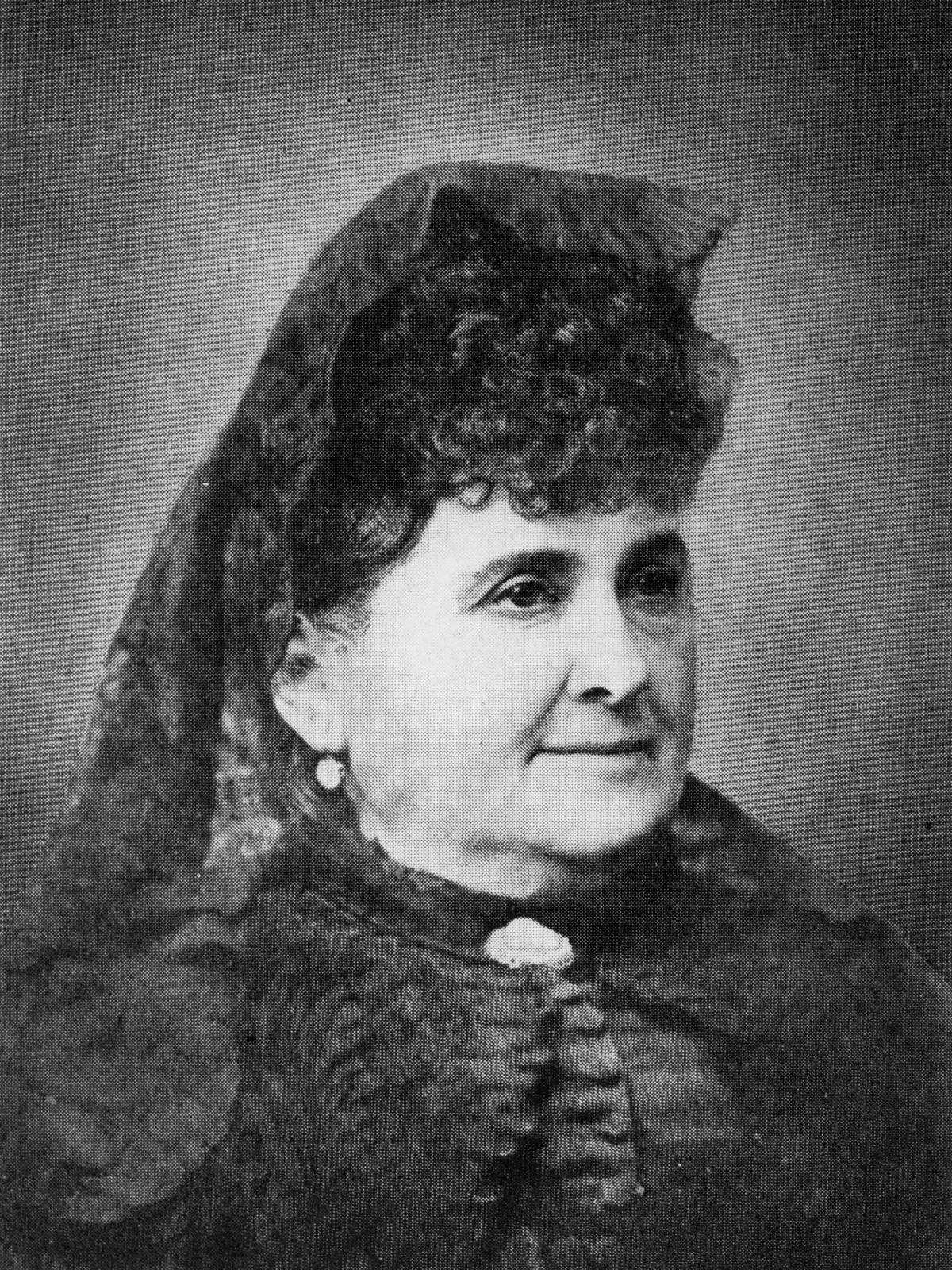
Arcadia Bandini de Stearns Baker

The residence was on the site of what became the Baker Block; and it was for many years, both before and after the change of government, a prominent social center for Southern California. Abel Stearns was married to Arcadia Bandini de Stearns Baker, and it was at this home that the famously beautiful daughters of Don Juan Bandini (Arcadia, Josefa, and Ysidora) entertained their wide circle of acquaintances from San Diego and Santa Barbara at grand balls and other social functions characteristic of life in Spanish countries. Here Commodore Jones in 1842, and Captain Fremont in 1846 and 1847, and other distinguished historical figures at various periods were hospitably entertained.

== History ==
Abel Stearns bought the lot at Main and Arcadia streets. in 1834. The house was erected between 1835 and 1838. It was a flat-roofed one-story structure covering a large area. At the corner of Arcadia and Main streets, a wing extended out to the line of the sidewalk. At the southern end, there was a similar projection. The central part of the building stood back from the street 25–30 feet (7.6–9.1 m) and the space between it and the sidewalk was paved with cobble stones. In the rear was a large patio or court yard partially enclosed by projecting wings from the main building. There was also a patio. The lot extended through to Los Angeles Street. Within the home, the city's elite as well as foreign guests were often entertained. Here Commodore Thomas ap Catesby Jones of the United States Navy and his officers were lodged and entertained when the Commodore came to Los Angeles to meet Governor Manuel Micheltorena and apologize to him for capturing Monterey.

At the Stearns house occurred the flag episode of 1839, which came near precipitating a revolution. Prefect Cosme Pena, appointed by Governor Juan Bautista Alvarado to keep the turbulent Angelenos in subjection, had established his headquarters in the Don Abel Stearns house. In front of the house, he had raised the flag of his prefecture and planted a cannon. Stearns, with but little respect for the Mexican flag (he hated Mexico), used the flagstaff for a post to tie cattle to, that were designated for slaughter. This desecration the patriotic young Angelenos resented; and while Pena was absent at San Pedro, a number of them gathered to pull down the flag; or as another account says, to sacrifice a bullock that was picketed to the flag pole as a peace offering to the outraged dignity of the cactus-perched eagle of the Mexican flag. Pena, on his return, had the leaders arrested for sedition and obtained a guard of ten soldiers to protect his flag. The citizens petitioned the Ayuntamiento to ask him to remove the flag to the public building where it would be treated with more respect, Pena, in a rage, resigned his office and left breathing vengeance against the Pueblo de Los Diablos (town of the devils). He reported his grievances to Governor Alvarado at Monterey. The twenty patriotic citizens who signed the petition were fined US$5.00 each, and the members of the Ayuntamiento, US$10.00 each, for their attempts to secure respect for the flag. The Stearns house was demolished in 1876, and the Baker Block erected on its site.
