= Kinney Heights, Los Angeles =

Neighborhood in Los Angeles, California, United States

Coordinates: 34.036027°N 118.313283°W

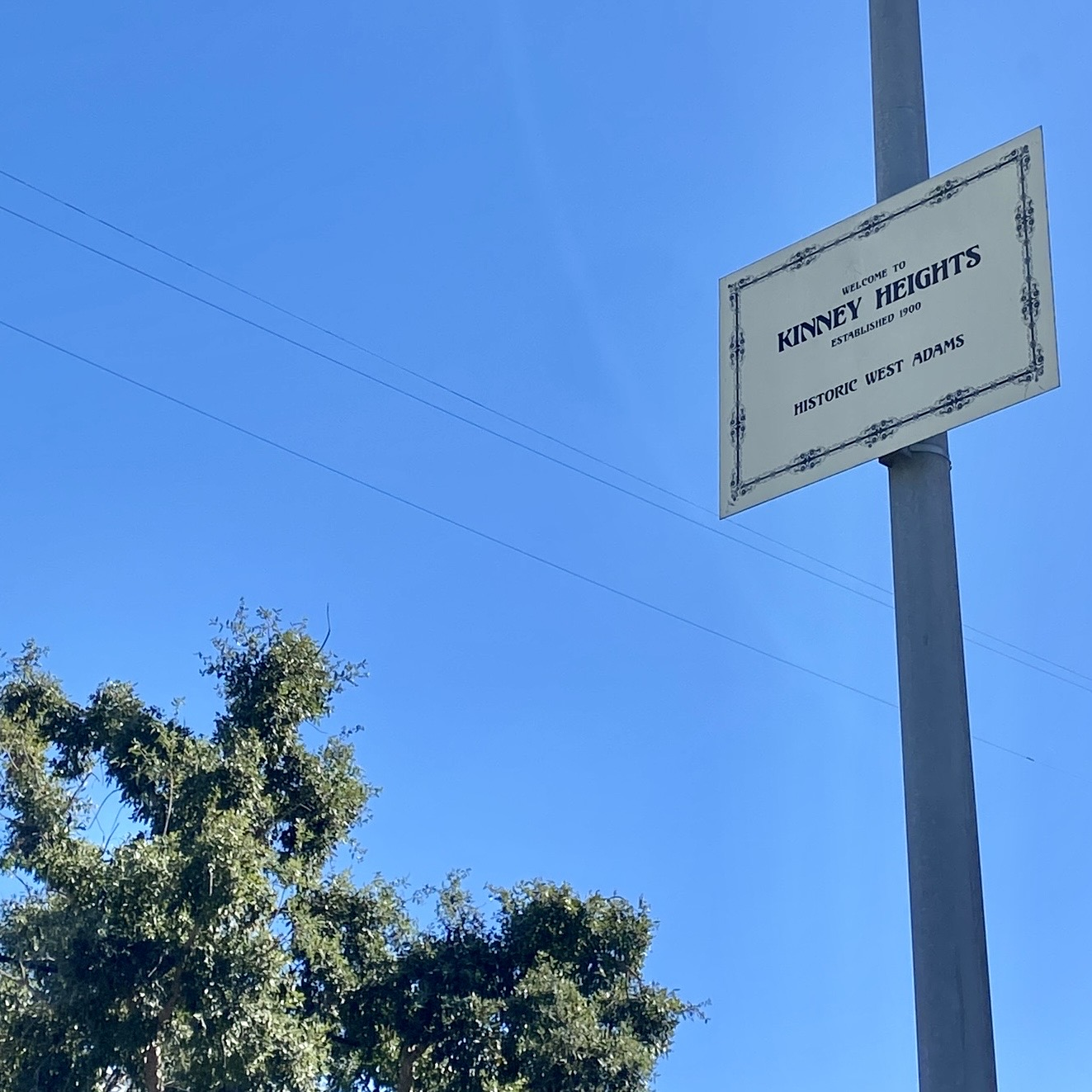
Kinney Heights neighborhood sign at Gramercy Place and 24th Street

Kinney Heights is a neighborhood in Los Angeles, California, bounded by Arlington, 23rd, Adams, and Hermosa (originally Gramercy Place), just south of Interstate 10. Kinney Heights is a subdistrict of the West Adams district of South Los Angeles, California; Curbed also associates it with Jefferson Park.

Before it was subdivided the land was owned by General Hanford Gordon Lennox. The area was developed in 1899 by developer Abbot Kinney, for whom it is named. It was a suburban tract of large Craftsman style homes at what was then the western edge of Los Angeles. The homes featured amenities like "beveled-glass china cabinets, marble fireplaces and mahogany floors". It was accessible to downtown via streetcar and attracted upper-middle-class families. At least one house in the neighborhood had a carriage house built on the property.

Many of the hundred-year-old homes are still standing and have been renovated and upgraded. The neighborhood is part of the West Adams Terrace Historic Preservation Overlay Zone (HPOZ). Neighboring subdistricts included Gramercy Park, Adams Place, and Berkeley Square.

The Williams Andrews Clark Library is located in Kinney Heights.

== Additional images ==
Kinney Heights, Los Angeles
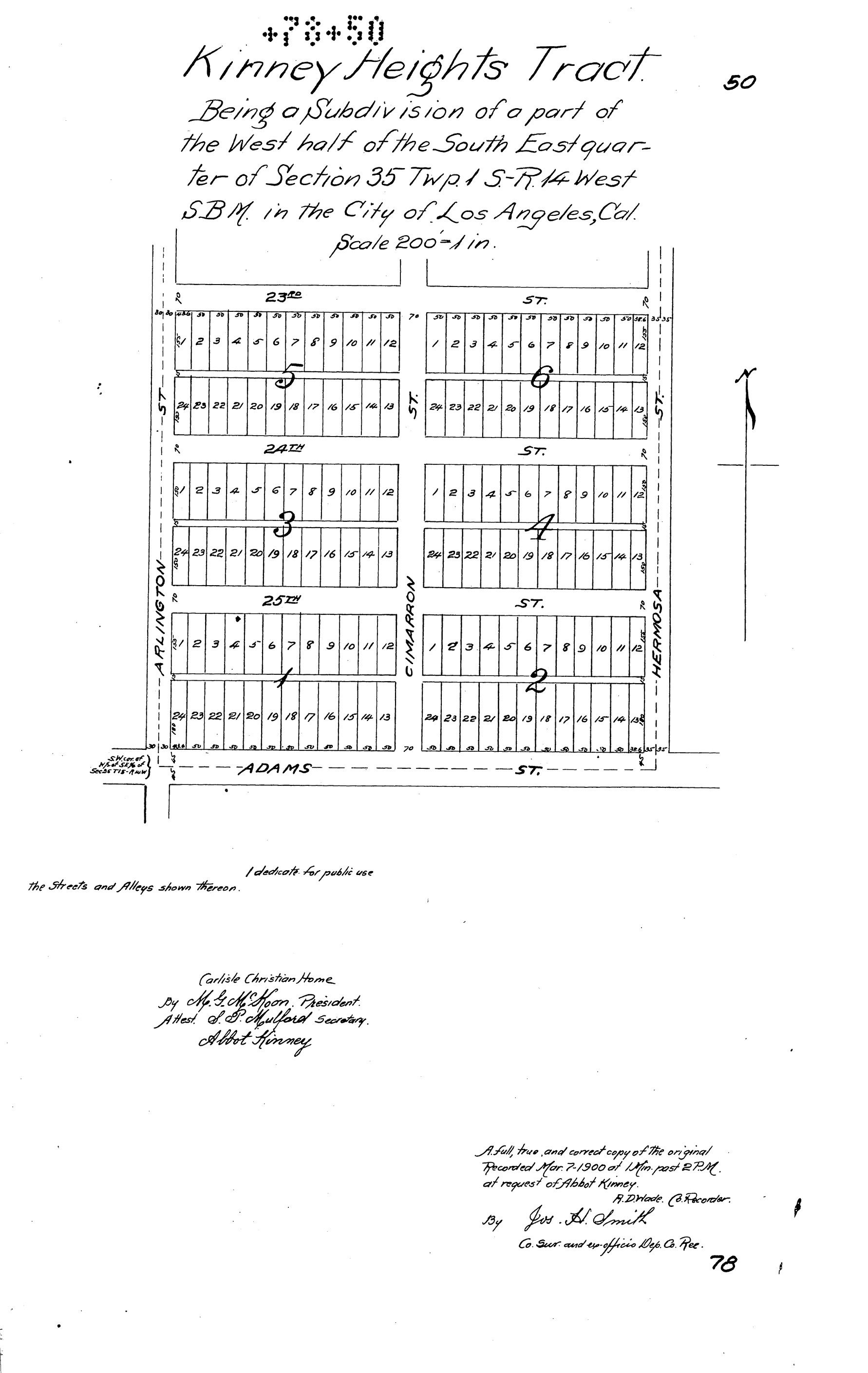
Kinney Heights tract map

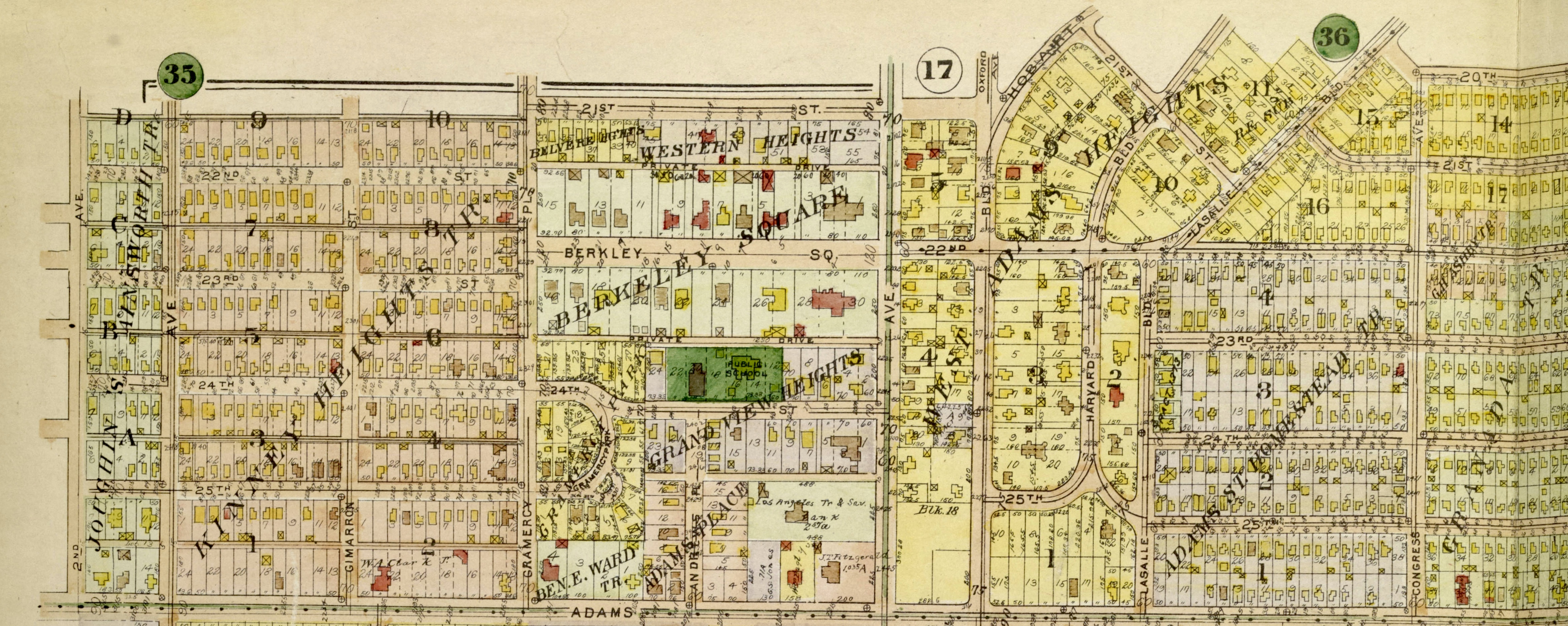
West Adams in 1921: Ainsworth Tract, Kinney Heights, Belvere Heights, Berkeley Square, Adams Place, West Adams Heights, Gramercy Park, Grand View Heights, and Adams Street Homestead Tract

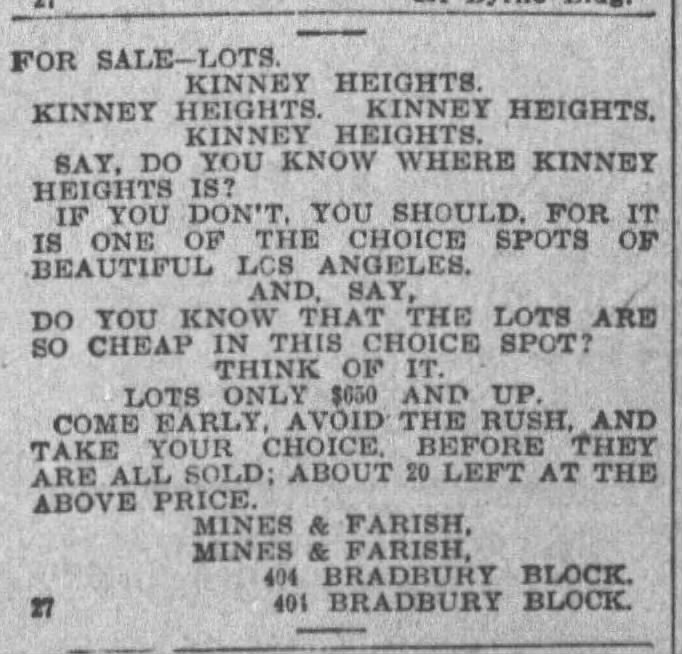
"For Sale: Lots" Los Angeles Times, 1902

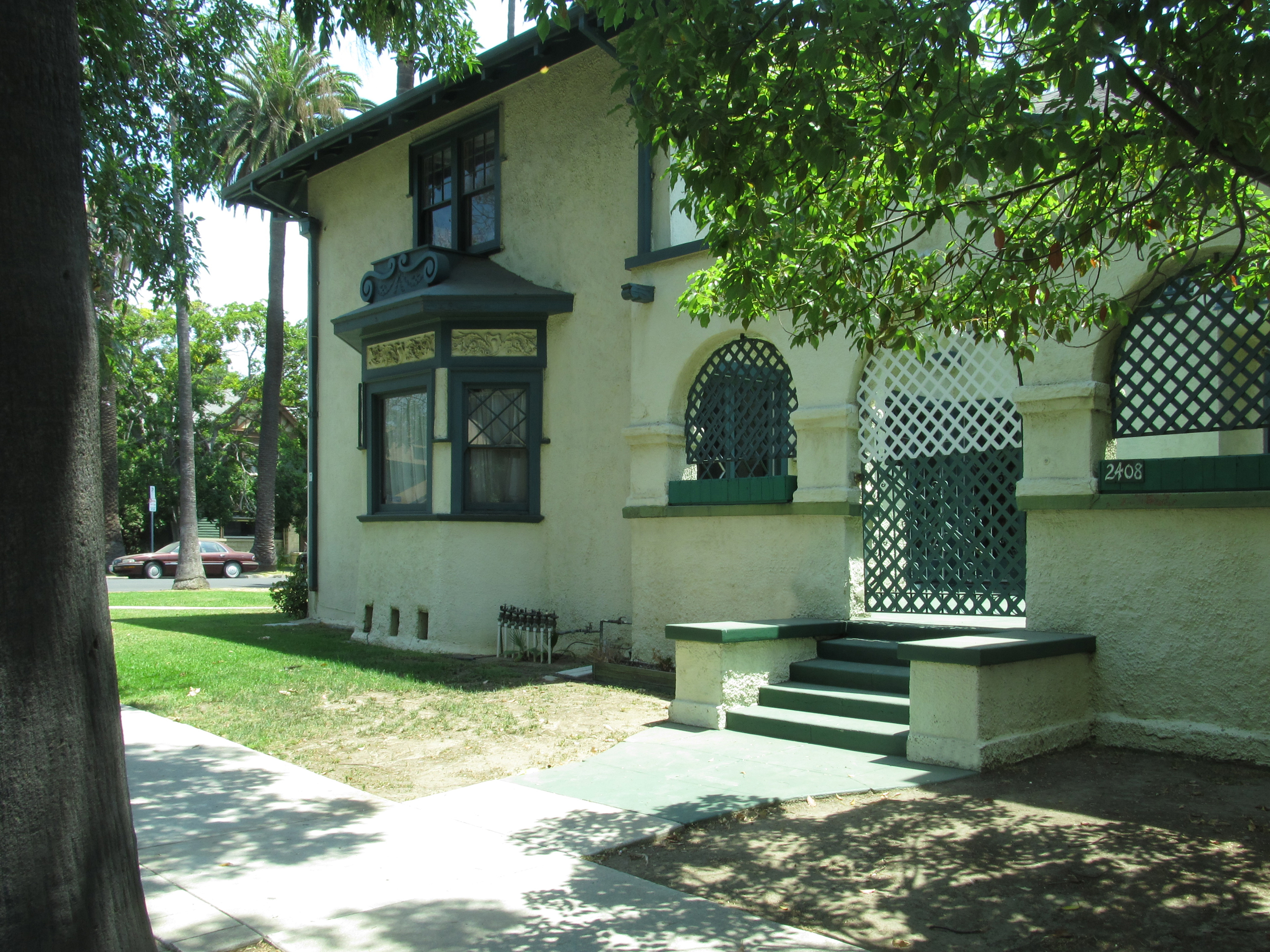
Valle Vista Tourist Home on Cimmaron (2021)

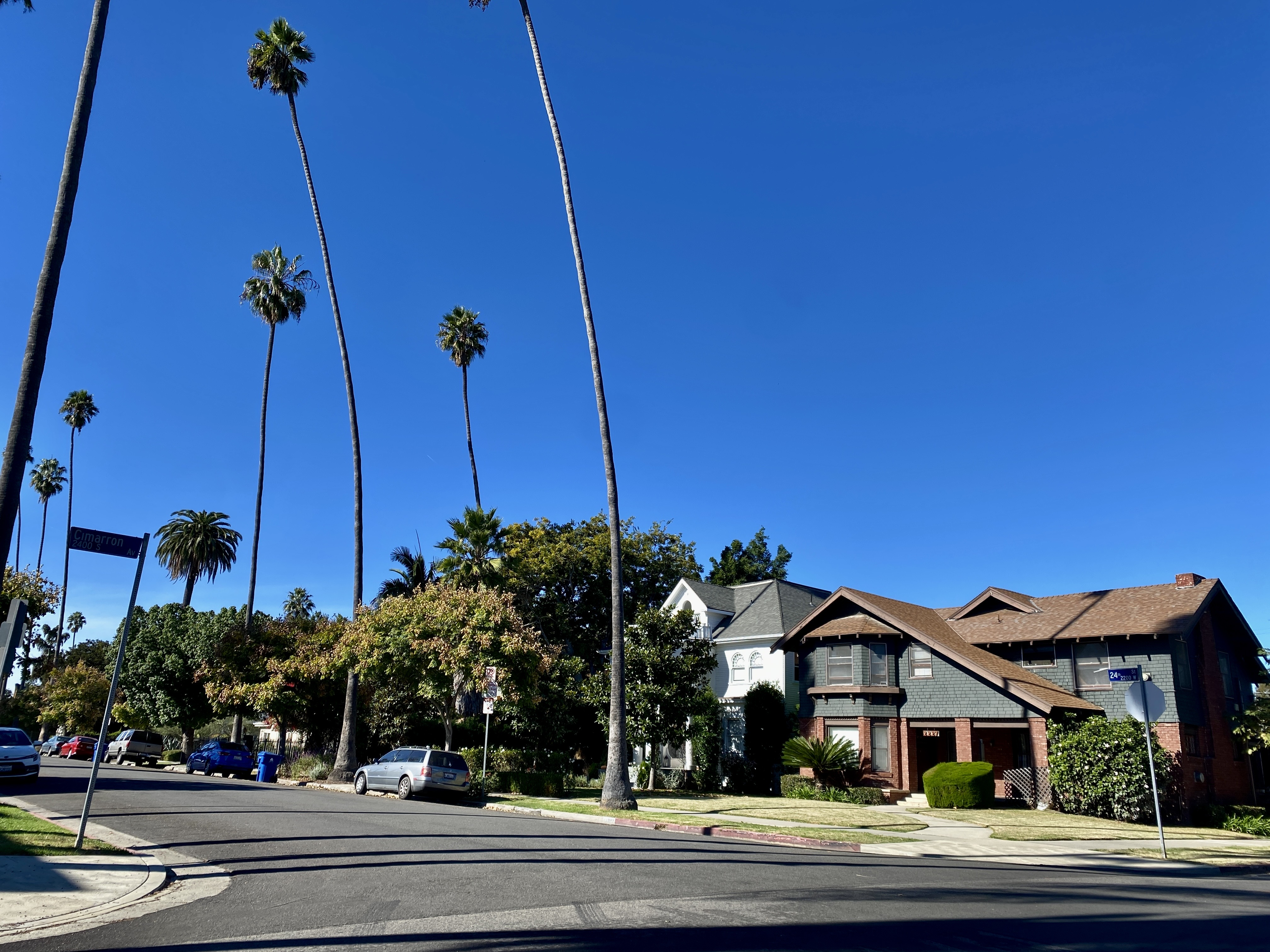
Houses at Cimarron and 24th (2023)

== See also ==
- Gramercy Park, Los Angeles
- Western Heights, Los Angeles
- West Adams Heritage Association
