= Arcadia Bandini de Stearns Baker =

Wealthy Californio landowner (1827–1912)

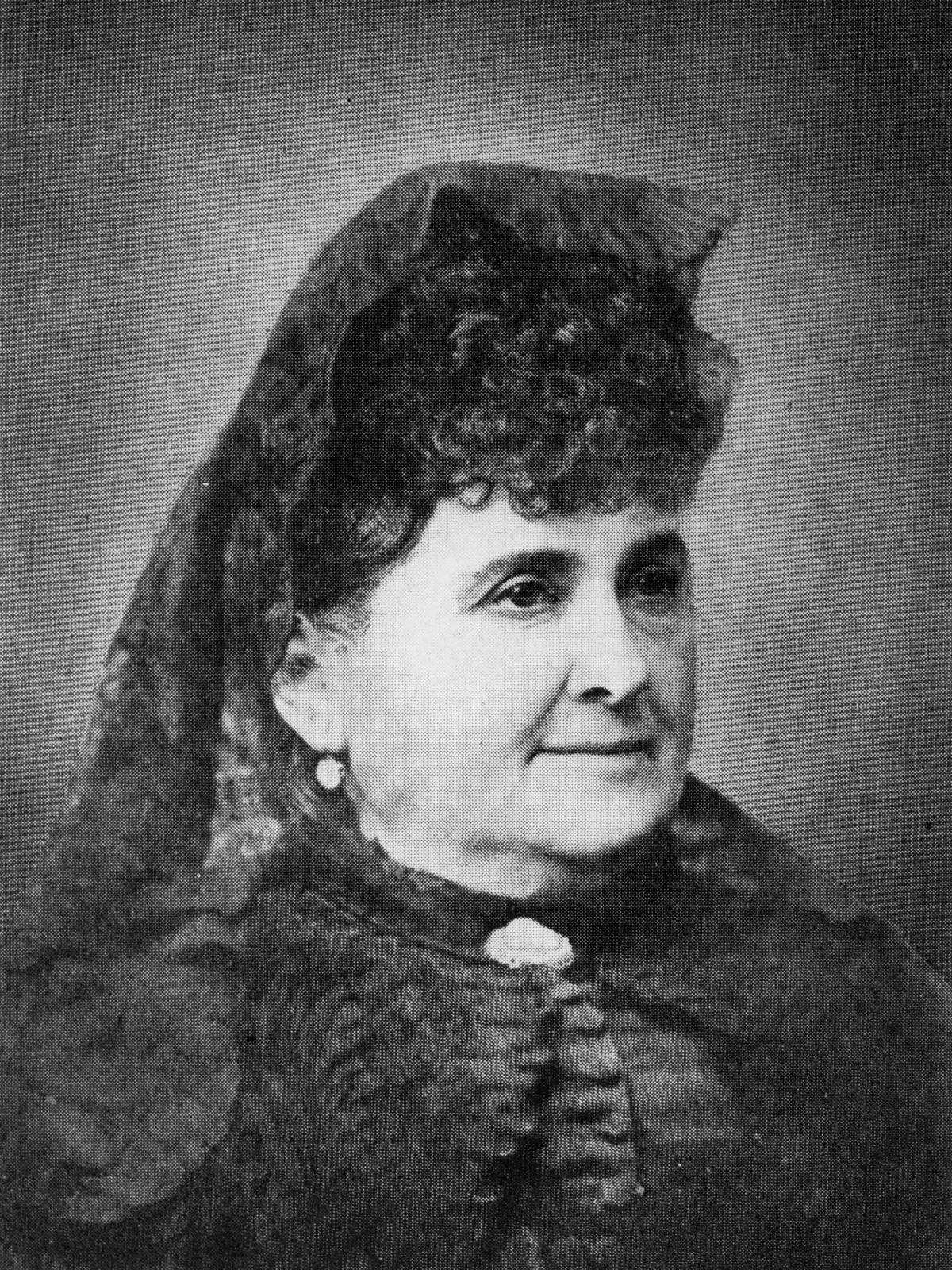
- Arcadia Bandini de Stearns Baker
- Born: Arcadia Bandini; 1827; San Diego, Alta California, First Mexican Republic (today California, U.S.)
- Died: 1912 (aged 84–85); Santa Monica, California, U.S.
- Resting place: Cavalry Cemetery (East Los Angeles)
- Occupations: Businesswoman, philanthropist, socialite
- Spouses: Abel Stearns (1841-1871; his death); Robert Symington Baker
- Parents: Juan Bandini (father); Marie de los Dolores Estudio (mother)
- Relatives: John Tracy Gaffey (nephew-in-law)

Arcadia Bandini de Stearns Baker (1827–1912) was a wealthy Californio landowner and socialite of Los Angeles. She played an important role in the elite society of early Los Angeles and, later, Santa Monica. She was married to two wealthy Anglo-American men over the course of her life, Abel Stearns and then Colonel Robert S. Baker. Like many californias of her time, Arcadia Bandini provided to her Anglo husbands opportunities for entrance into and alliances within the established californio elite society. She was a skilled businesswoman in her own right, as well as a renowned hostess and organizer of balls and other social functions.

Through her Bandini family wealth and the wealth of her husbands, she amassed an enormous estate and fortune, and upon her death was one of the wealthiest women in America. In her later life, she was considered "the great benefactress of Santa Monica" for her investments in and contributions to the development of the city. As she had no children and died intestate (without leaving a will), her death prompted an infamous court battle for control of her estate.

== Early life: the Bandini family ==
Arcadia Bandini was born in 1827 in San Diego, California, to Juan Bandini and Marie de los Dolores Estudillo. Her father Juan, born in Peru, was considered the "first citizen of San Diego," and the Bandini family home, Casa de Bandini, was the center of San Diego society. The social gatherings and dances in the Bandini home and gardens were so renowned that Juan Bandini achieved legend status and was labeled by historian Winifred Davidson as the "Prince of Hosts."

The Bandinis were social elites and one of the richest landholding families in the area, which made the three daughters very attractive potential marriage partners to ambitious men seeking land and status in the californio community. Bandini and her two younger sisters, Ysidora and Josefa, were known as three of the most beautiful women in Alta California.

Juan Bandini, a former revolutionary himself, supported the Anglo American invaders during the 1846 Bear Flag Revolt. His extensive business dealings with Anglo American men like Abel Stearns led him to believe that the future of California would be American, not Mexican. Bandini and her sisters Ysidora and Josefa were said to have made a United States flag out of fabric from their own clothes and put it up at Juan Bandini's San Diego ranch in 1847.

== Marriages ==
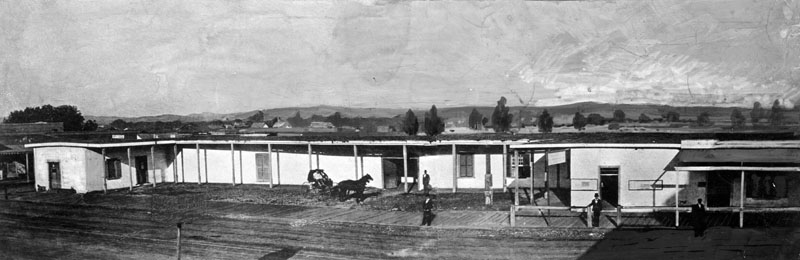
El Palacio, the adobe home where Arcadia and Abel lived

=== To Abel Stearns ===
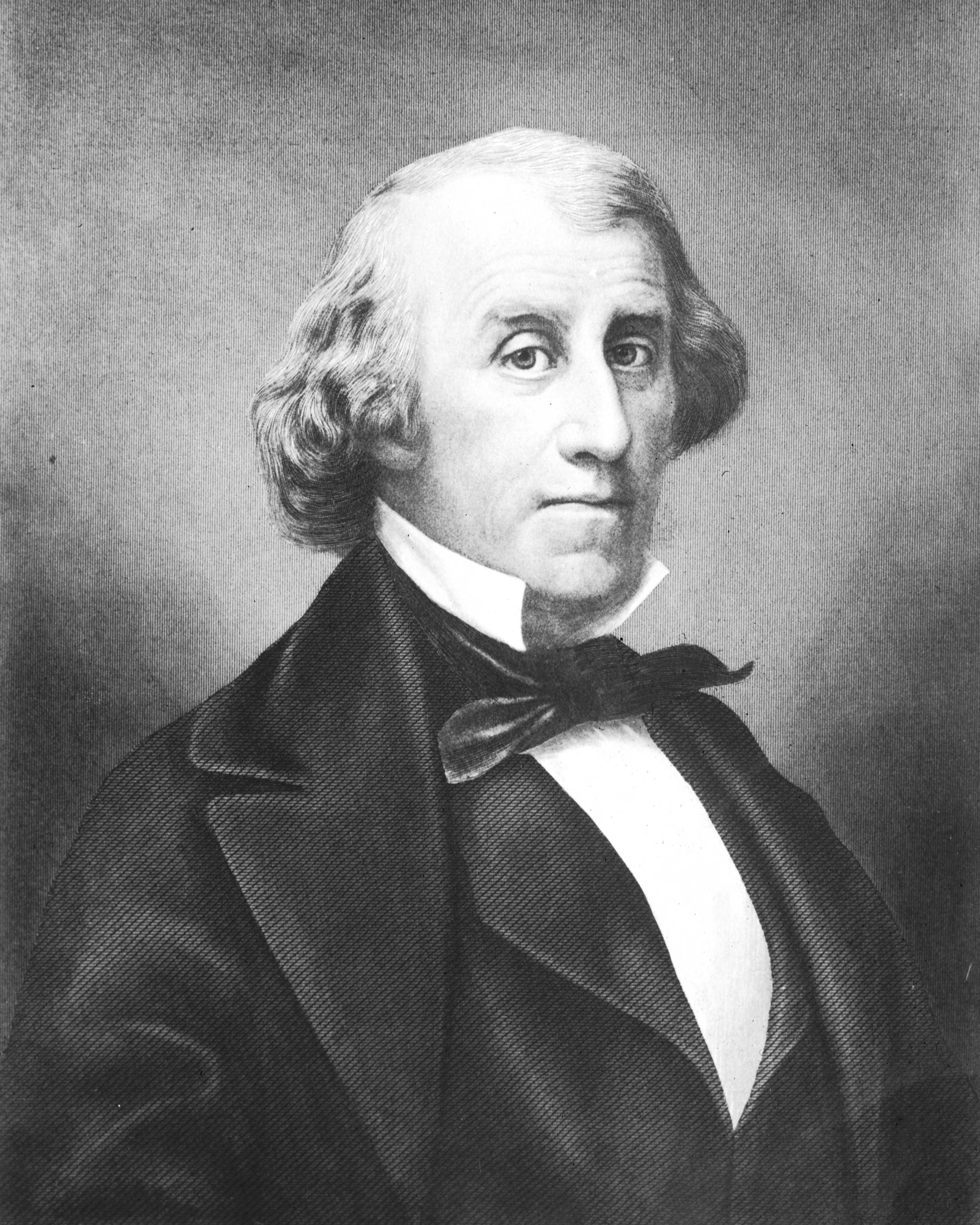
Portrait of Abel Stearns

At age 14, in 1841, Arcadia Bandini married the 43-year-old Anglo-American Abel Stearns, who had moved west from his hometown in Lunenburg, Massachusetts. The marriage was arranged by Juan Bandini, Bandini's father, as Stearns and Juan Bandini were close political allies and friends. Bandini's younger sister, Ysidora, moved to Los Angeles with her to be her companion.

As Abel Stearns was not born a Mexican citizen, he had to petition the Los Angeles civil government to marry Bandini. He also had to petition the Catholic authorities, which was standard procedure for the time; the Church considered all prospective Catholic marriages to ensure that the parties' ages were appropriate, that they were not already married to others, whether their births were legitimate, and, chiefly, whether the union would be incestuous. While the gap in their ages was substantial, at 29 years (and Stearns himself claimed to authorities to be 40 rather than 43, perhaps to make the gap smaller), it was relatively common at this time for very young californias to marry significantly older Euro-American men. The Catholic Church had determined 11 to be the age below which a girl could not get married, so Bandini was above that standard.

Stearns, a former U.S. citizen, became a naturalized Mexican citizen and converted to Catholicism in order to do business and own property in Mexican California. He became one of the wealthiest men in Los Angeles, and his wealth was supplemented by Bandini's substantial dowry of land. They lived together in a home called El Palacio (The Palace; also known as the Don Abel Stearns House), built in 1859 in the Pueblo de Los Angeles. This large adobe home, which surrounded an extensive courtyard and patio, was a major site for Los Angeles high society. Here, the couple entertained and hosted influential guests like Commodore Jones and Captain Frémont. An 1860 census form recorded 19 people living in El Palacio, including "Refugio Bandini, Bandini's sisters, nieces, nephews, distinguished guests, secretaries, servants, painters, and laborers" in addition to Abel and Arcadia.

Arcadia Bandini de Stearns, along with her sisters, hosted many balls and other grand social functions for elite californios and naturalized Anglo-Americans like Stearns; de Stearns Baker, in particular, has been characterized by scholars as having "ruled Los Angeles society" in this period.

Abel Stearns, nicknamed "Cara de Caballo" (Horse Face) for his long face, was generally known and remembered as a good friend and husband, but was also known to have a bad temper. de Stearns Baker's grand-nephew Ricardo Bandini Johnson told a reporter from the Santa Monica Mirror that Abel was "often away" from home and thus "did not pay a lot of attention to Arcadia.” The couple did not have any children. Stearns died in 1871, at age 72, leaving all of his fortune (in land and money) to de Stearns Baker.

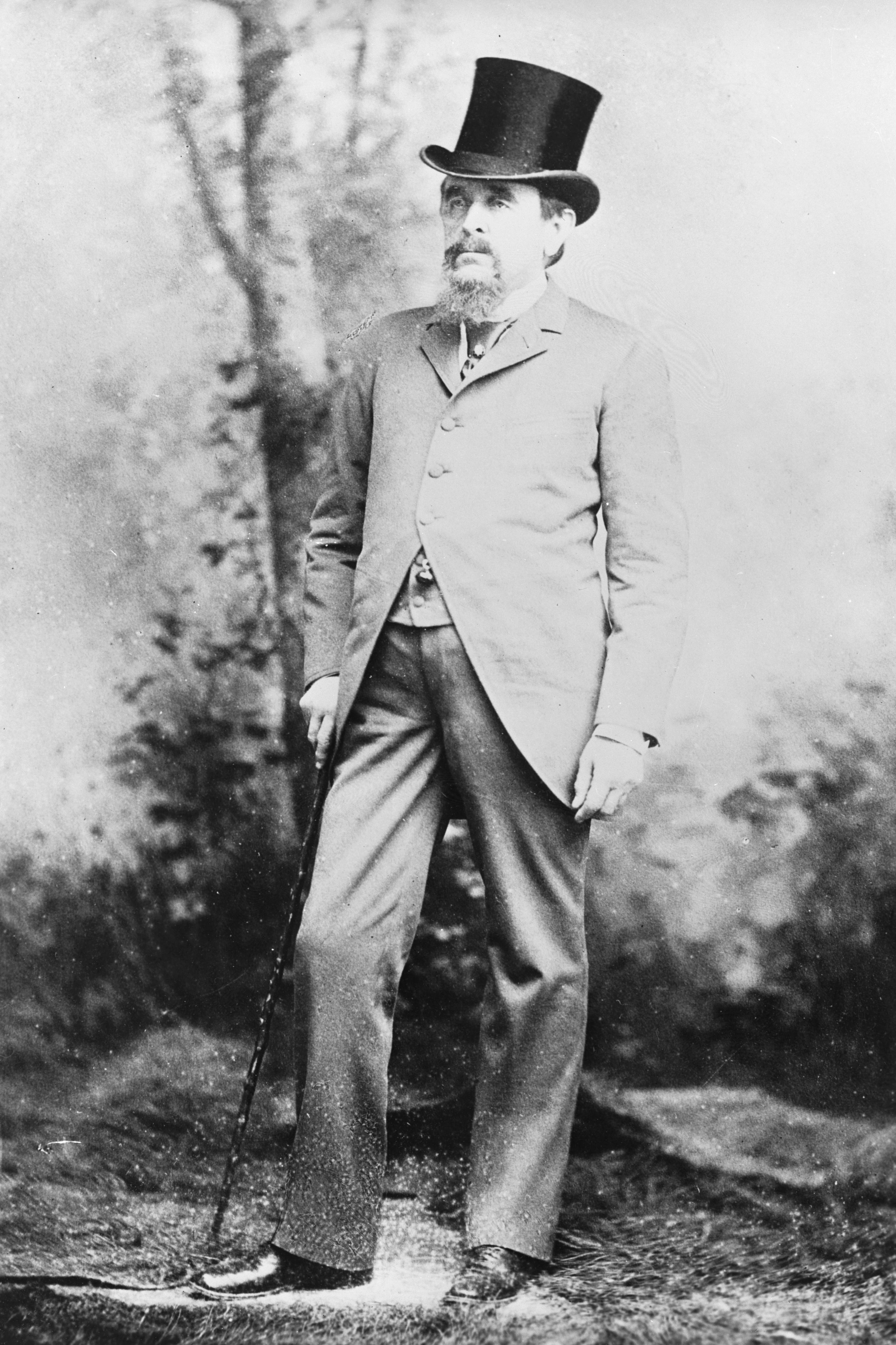
Portrait of Colonel Robert S. Baker

=== To Colonel Robert S. Baker ===
In 1875, the widowed de Stearns Baker married Colonel Robert S. Baker (1826–1894), a wealthy Anglo American from Rhode Island who owned Rancho San Vicente y Santa Monica, where they settled. Colonel Baker had come to California in 1849 during the Gold Rush and worked in the San Francisco mining supplies business, as the company Cooke and Baker. He then worked in the cattle and sheep trade in Northern California, before purchasing Rancho San Vicente y Santa Monica from the Sepúlveda family for the opportunities in the cattle trade it offered. With this purchase, he moved to Los Angeles, where he met and married de Stearns Baker. Baker's possession, through the marriage, of the Bandini family's holdings of Rancho La Laguna and Rancho La Puente further expanded his ranching business.

The couple moved to Santa Monica, where they played a crucial role in the development of the community (see below in "Santa Monica" section). They resided in "Ocean Cottage" by the pier. At the home, de Stearns Baker continued to do what she had done so well in Casa de Bandini and El Palacio - entertaining and hosting many elite guests and influential political figures.

The Bakers did not have children. Colonel Baker died in 1894, leaving his money and estate to his widow. de Stearns Baker continued to live in their home on Ocean Avenue until her death in 1912.

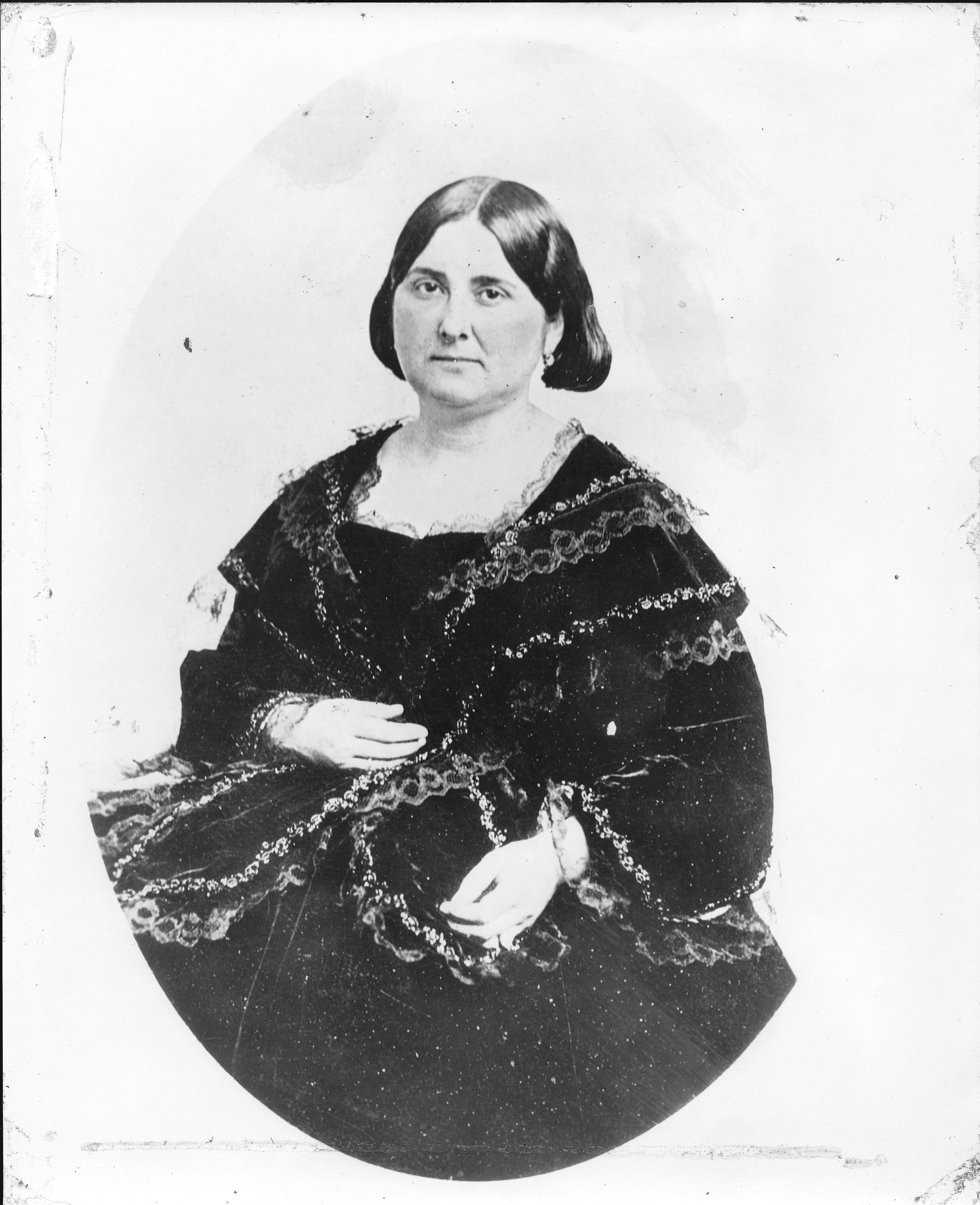
Portrait of Arcadia de Baker in 1885

== Landowner, businesswoman, and benefactress ==
Though she married two Anglo-American men and during her lifetime California came under control of the United States, de Stearns Baker reportedly never spoke English, but rather did business in Castilian Spanish. Thus, she required an interpreter; for many years, her husband Abel Stearns filled this role. Bandini de Stearns Baker's choice to continue to speak her native tongue links her to other elite california women like Rosalía Vallejo, who famously refused to speak in English.

=== Los Angeles ===
Much of the commercial life of the city of Los Angeles, as well as the high society life, centered on Abel and de Stearns Baker because of the prominence of Abel Stearns' warehouse, "La Casa de San Pedro." The warehouse operated as one of the four most significant trading ports in the West during this time period and was connected from San Pedro to Los Angeles via a stagecoach line. de Stearns Baker's name was on all of Abel Stearns' investments alongside his, so she shared in his wealth as a business partner in addition to as a wife. After Stearns' death, de Stearns Baker ran his businesses.

Even when de Stearns Baker had moved to Santa Monica, she remained a powerful presence in Los Angeles society and charity work. In the early 1900s, when she was in her seventies and thus not very involved with the new women's clubs of the city, she was still "a key source of funds, in-kind donations, and society support" for the club causes. de Stearns Baker's wealth and social status made her "the most formidable of all" the elite California women, and she worked with Los Angeles club women on events like the yearly Fiesta de las Flores.

=== Santa Monica ===
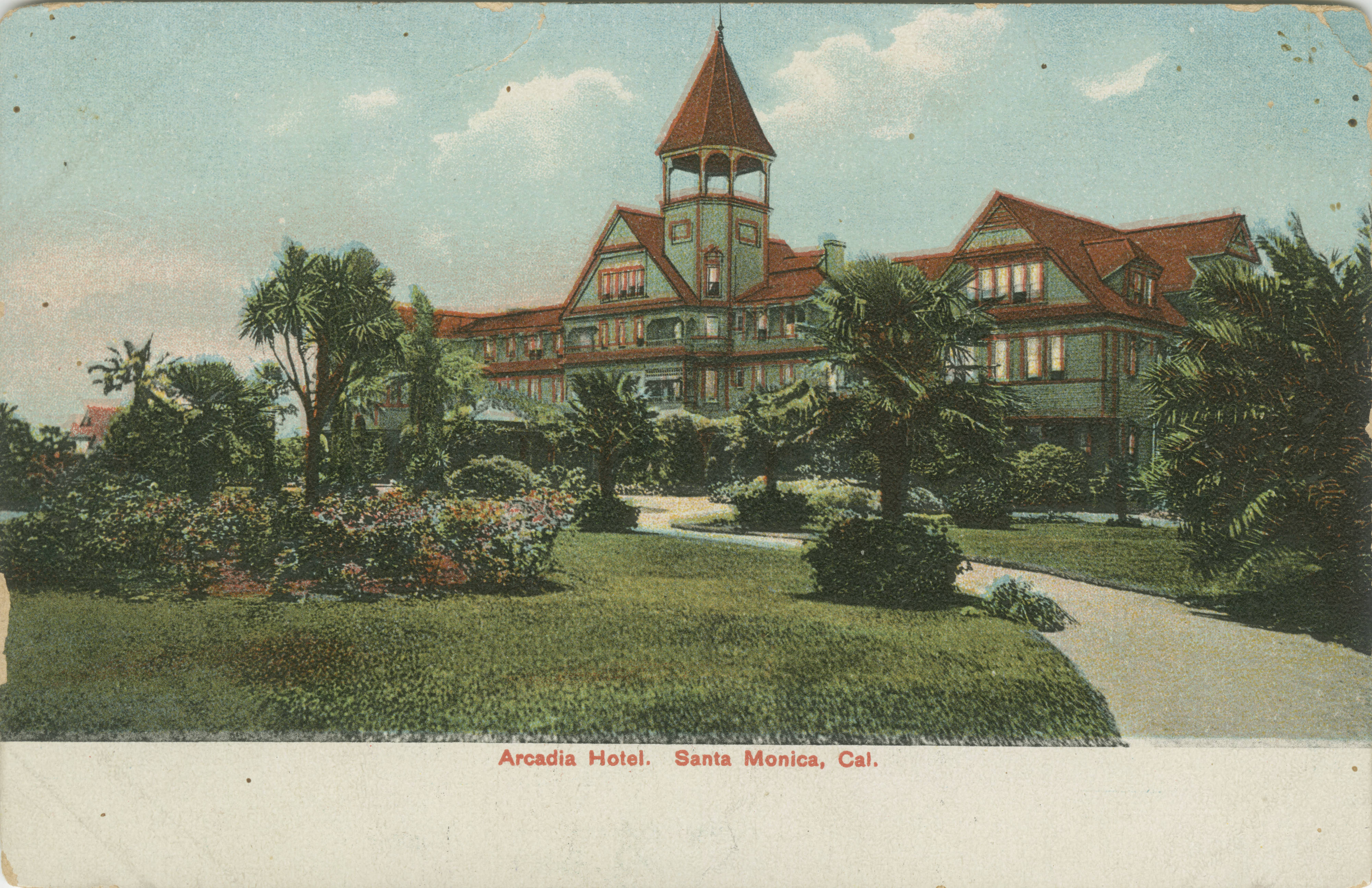
The Arcadia Hotel in Santa Monica, named for Arcadia Bandini de Stearns Baker

Arcadia de Stearns Baker was known as the "godmother of Santa Monica" and a "great benefactress" for her contributions to and vision for the formation and development of the city. As she created the original map for the city plan and layout, her aesthetic vision was crucial in structuring Santa Monica.

She donated a great deal of her land – for example, to the city of Santa Monica for Palisades Park; to the government to form a National Home for Disabled Veterans (now the Veterans' Administration); to the government to create the first experimental forestry station in the United States; and to schools, churches, and clubs (like the Bay City Women's Club).

In 1879, de Stearns Baker bought out her husband Colonel Baker's land and business holdings and officially became the business partner of John Percival Jones. In 1897, de Stearns Baker and Jones founded the Santa Monica Land and Water Company, which "subdivided and developed about 50,000 acres in West Los Angeles."

== Legacy ==
The grand hotel at 1700 Ocean Avenue, by the Santa Monica pier, was named "The Arcadia Hotel" in honor of Arcadia Bandini de Baker. It opened its doors in 1887, but was closed down and demolished in 1909.

On October 18, 1987, a bronze bust of Arcadia Bandini de Baker was unveiled at Palisades Park, Santa Monica. Created by artist Masahito Sanae, the bust is mounted on a four-foot pedestal and is placed at the center of a rose garden. A bronze plaque on the front reads:

DEDICATED / TO / ARCADIA BANDINI DE BAKER / 1827-1912 / FOR HER LOVE AND DEVOTION TO SANTA MONICA AND / GENEROUS CONTRIBUTIONS OF LAND TO BENEFIT / THE PEOPLE AND FOR THE DEVELOPMENT OF THE CITY / BY / THE CITY OF SANTA MONICA / BANDIDI FAMILIES AND FRIENDS / SANTA MONICA HISTORICAL SOCIETY / MASAHITO SANAE / SCULPTOR / OCTOBER 18, 1987.

== Ethnic/racial identity ==
Many elite Californios/as like Arcadia Bandini stressed their "Spanish" (rather than Mexican) blood and heritage, thus aligning themselves with Europe and whiteness and distancing themselves from the mestizaje (racial mixing) associated with Mexico Marrying white Anglo American men, like Abel Stearns and Robert S. Baker, served as further confirmation and assertion of whiteness.

When this white or "Spanish" racial status was challenged, Californias like de Stearns Baker were often outraged. An instance described by scholar Eileen Wallis illustrates this. When the General Federation of Women's Clubs in Los Angeles made the decision to officially exclude African American women from their membership, the influential clubwoman Caroline Severance (though officially supporting the new policy) remarked that she did not understand why white Americans associated socially with "Italians, Spaniards, and representatives of other dark-skinned races", but not with African Americans. Bandini de Stearns Baker, a benefactor of clubwomen causes and events, was so furious at being labeled part of a "dark-skinned" race that she decided not to participate in the annual Fiesta de Flores in Los Angeles and took back her donation to the fund, setting a precedent that other elite Californias followed.

== Death and legal battle over estate ==
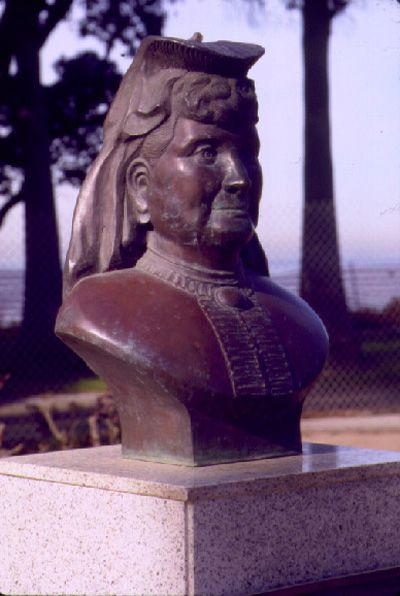
The Bust of Arcadia Bandini de Baker in Palisades Park, Santa Monica.

Arcadia Bandini de Stearns Baker died in 1912, at age 85, and was interred between her husbands at Calvary Cemetery, East Los Angeles. It is estimated that 2,000 people attended her funeral, held in St. Vibiana's Cathedral, which is a testament to her status as a public figure and pillar of the community.

The numbers vary, but the estate she left was estimated to be between $8 and $15 million. Because she left no will, her death thus launched a large-scale court battle for control of her large fortune and holdings. In the years after her death, many potential heirs fought each other for the money. 42 distant relatives of Abel Stearns tried to claim the estate, but a Los Angeles judge ruled that their rights were terminated by the marriage of de Stearns Baker to Colonel Baker, so they eventually settled for 10%. In the end, the rest of the estate was distributed among de Stearns Baker's relatives.

The legacy of this battle, and of Arcadia Bandini's philanthropy, was recently revived in a 2011 court case in which "advocates of homeless veterans" sued the Veterans Administration for renting out a substantial part of the land de Stearns Baker had originally donated to the federal government to found a National Home for Disabled Veterans. One of the plaintiffs was Carolina Winston Barrie, who was referred to as a "direct descendant" of Arcadia Bandini – but because Bandini had no children, this is inaccurate in the traditional sense of the term. Barrie is rather the great-great niece of de Stearns Baker, and the direct descendant of one of the heirs of the estate. Ultimately, the federal government settled in the case and the Veterans Administration must "develop a master land-use plan...that identifies sites for housing homeless veterans."

== See also ==
- Don Abel Stearns House
- Concepción Argüello
- Juana Briones de Miranda
