= Rancho San Vicente y Santa Mónica =

Mexican land grant in California

Coordinates: 34.030°N 118.500°W

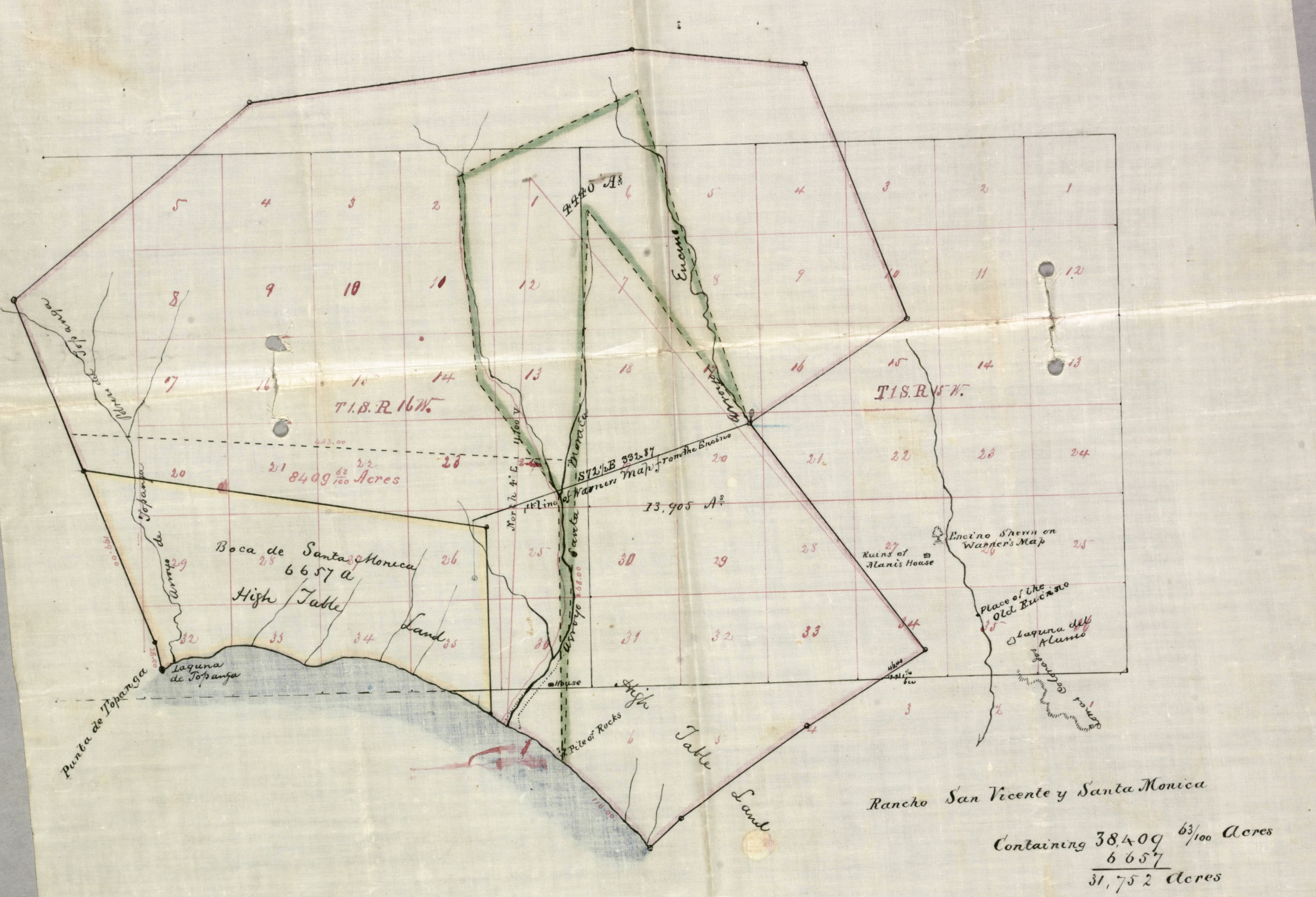
United States survey plat (after 1850) of Rancho San Vicente y Santa Mónica with creeks marked

Rancho San Vicente y Santa Mónica was a 33,000-acre (130 km^{2}) Mexican land grant in present-day Los Angeles County, California, given by governor Juan Alvarado in 1839 to Francisco Sepúlveda II, a soldier and citizen of Los Angeles. The rancho included what are now Santa Monica, Brentwood, Mandeville Canyon, and parts of Bel-Air and West Los Angeles.

== History ==
In 1839, Governor Alvarado gave possession to Francisco Sepulveda II of the lands known as San Vicente, with a piece of pasture (potrero) named Santa Mónica. But the boundaries of the lands were not well defined and there was soon a dispute as to the territory included. In 1839 Francisco Marquez and Ysidro Reyes had received the grant to Rancho Boca de Santa Monica which also included the "potrero" of Santa Mónica. In 1840 Francisco Sepulveda petitioned governor Alvarado to place him in "pacific possession of the property, as Francisco Marquez and Ysidro Reyes have given a bad example of disobedience and that under the strength of discordant documents they remain in possession of the place called Santa Mónica".

With the cession of California to the United States following the Mexican–American War, the 1848 Treaty of Guadalupe Hidalgo provided that the land grants would be honored. As required by the Land Act of 1851, a claim for Rancho San Vicente y Santa Mónica was filed with the Public Land Commission in 1852. Francisco Sepulveda died in 1853. The dispute over the boundaries continued and was not settled until the question came into the United States courts. After long litigation, the Rancho San Vicente y Santa Mónica grant was patented to the Sepulveda heirs at 30,260 acres (122 km^{2}) in 1881.

The Sepulveda Adobe was the home of Jose Dolores Sepulveda, one of the sons of Francisco Sepulveda. It was probably located in the Sawtelle area, near the intersection of Bundy Drive and Wilshire Boulevard, close to springs discovered by Portola. The building no longer exists.

In 1872, the Sepulvedas sold their Rancho San Vicente y Santa Mónica property to Robert S. Baker. Baker sold a three quarter interest in the land to the Comstock millionaire John Percival Jones in 1874. Later owners include Dr. Wilson Jones, Mr. Sanford, Benito Wilson, and John Wolfskill.

== See also ==
- Rancho Boca de Santa Monica
- Rancho la Ballona
- Ranchos of California
- List of Ranchos of California
