= Outline of running =

Overview of and topical guide to running

The following outline is provided as an overview of and topical guide to running:

Running – means of rapidly traveling on foot, in which at regular points during the running cycle both feet are off the ground. Running is a key component to a number of sporting events typically in the realm of road racing, track and field or triathlon.

== Nature of running ==
Running can be described as:

- Exercise
  - Aerobic exercise
- A sport
  - A component of athletics
  - An individual sport
  - A team sport (see relay race)
- A form of travel
  - Animal locomotion
    - Terrestrial locomotion

== Forms of running ==
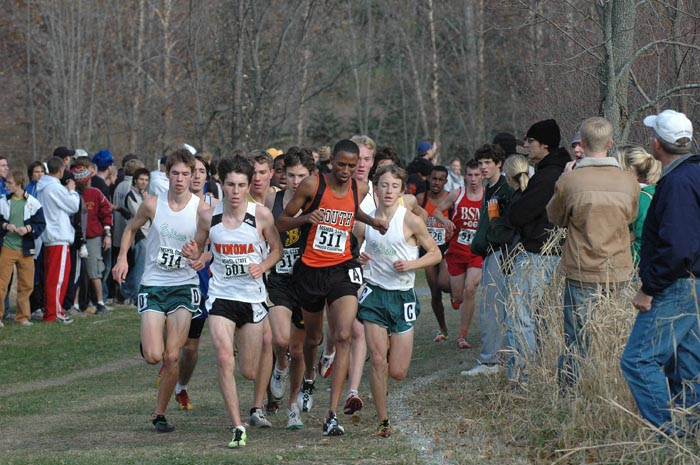
The Minnesota state high school cross country meet, with Elliott Heath and Hassan Mead leading.

- Backward running
- Barefoot running
- Sprinting
- Jogging
- ChiRunning
- Level and incline running
- Long-distance running – form of continuous running over distances of at least 5 kilometres (3.1 mi). Physiologically, it is largely aerobic in nature and requires stamina as well as mental strength.

=== Running sports events ===
- Track and field
  - Sprints
    - 50 m
    - 55 m
    - 60 m
    - 100 m
    - 150 m
    - 200 m
    - 300 m
    - 400 m
  - Hurdles
    - 50 m
    - 55 m
    - 60 m
    - 100 m
    - 110 m
    - 200 m
    - 300 m
    - 400 m
  - Middle distance running
    - 500 m
    - 600 m
    - 800 m
    - 1500 m
    - 3000 m
    - Steeplechase
  - Long-distance track events
    - 5000 m
    - 10,000 m
    - One hour run
  - Relays
    - 4 × 100 m
    - 4 × 200 m
    - 4 × 400 m
    - 4 × 800 m
    - Distance medley relay
    - Sprint medley relay
    - Swedish relay
- Road running
  - 5K
    - 5K race profiles
  - 10K
    - 10K race profiles
  - Quarter marathon
  - 10-miles
    - 10 mile race profiles
  - 20K
  - Half marathon
    - Specific half marathon profiles
  - Marathon
    - Specific Argentina marathon profiles
    - Specific Australian marathon profiles
    - Specific Canadian marathon profiles
    - Specific Chinese marathon profiles
    - Specific European marathon profiles
    - Specific German marathon profiles
    - Specific Indian marathon profiles
    - Specific Japan marathon profiles
    - Specific Lithuanian marathon profiles
    - Specific Pakistani marathon profiles
    - Specific Slovenian marathon profiles
    - Specific U.K. marathon profiles
    - Specific U.S. Marathon profiles
  - Ultramarathon
  - Multiday race
  - Ekiden
- Off-road running
- Adventure running
- Cross country running
  - Fell running
    - Fell running competitions
  - Mountain running
    - Mountain running events
- Trail running
- Multi-discipline sports of which running is a part:
  - Multisports that include running:
    - Adventure racing
    - Aquathlon
    - Duathlon
    - Triathlon – which includes running as its final, third component
    - Quadrathlon
  - Tetrathlon
  - Modern pentathlon
  - Heptathlon
  - Octathlon
  - Decathlon
- Tower running

== Running venues ==
- List of largest running events

== Running equipment ==
- Footwear
  - Athletic shoe
  - Racing flats
  - Socks
  - Track spikes
- Cheetah Flex-Foot
- Running shorts
- Timing transponder

== Injury prevention ==
- Stretching
- Cross-training

== Physiology of running ==
- Gait

=== Running injuries ===
- Achilles tendon
  - Achilles tendinitis
  - Achilles tendon rupture
- Foot blisters
- Iliotibial band syndrome
- Pulled muscle
  - Pulled hamstring
- Runner's knee
- Runner's toe
- Shin splints
- Sprained ankle
- Stress fractures

== History of running ==
History of running

- Persistence hunting
- Running in Ancient Greece
  - Stadion (running race)
  - Dolichos (running race)
  - Diaulos (running race)
- History of the marathon
- Four-minute mile
- 10-second barrier

== Running organizations ==
- Amateur Athletic Association – the oldest national governing body for athletics in the world, having been established on 24 April 1880.
- Athletics Canada
- Athletics New Zealand
- World Athletics (formerly the International Association of Athletics Federations (IAAF))
  - Asian Athletics Association – sponsor of the Asian Championships
  - Confederation of African Athletics – sponsor of the African Championships in Athletics
  - CONSUDATLE – sponsor of the South American Championships in Athletics and the South American Cross Country Championships
  - European Athletic Association – sponsor of the European Athletics Championships among others
  - North America, Central America and Caribbean Athletic Association (NACAC) sponsor of the NACAC Championships
  - Oceania Athletics Association – sponsor of the Oceania Athletics Championships
- Road Runners Club of America
- UK Athletics
- USA Track & Field

== Persons influential in running ==
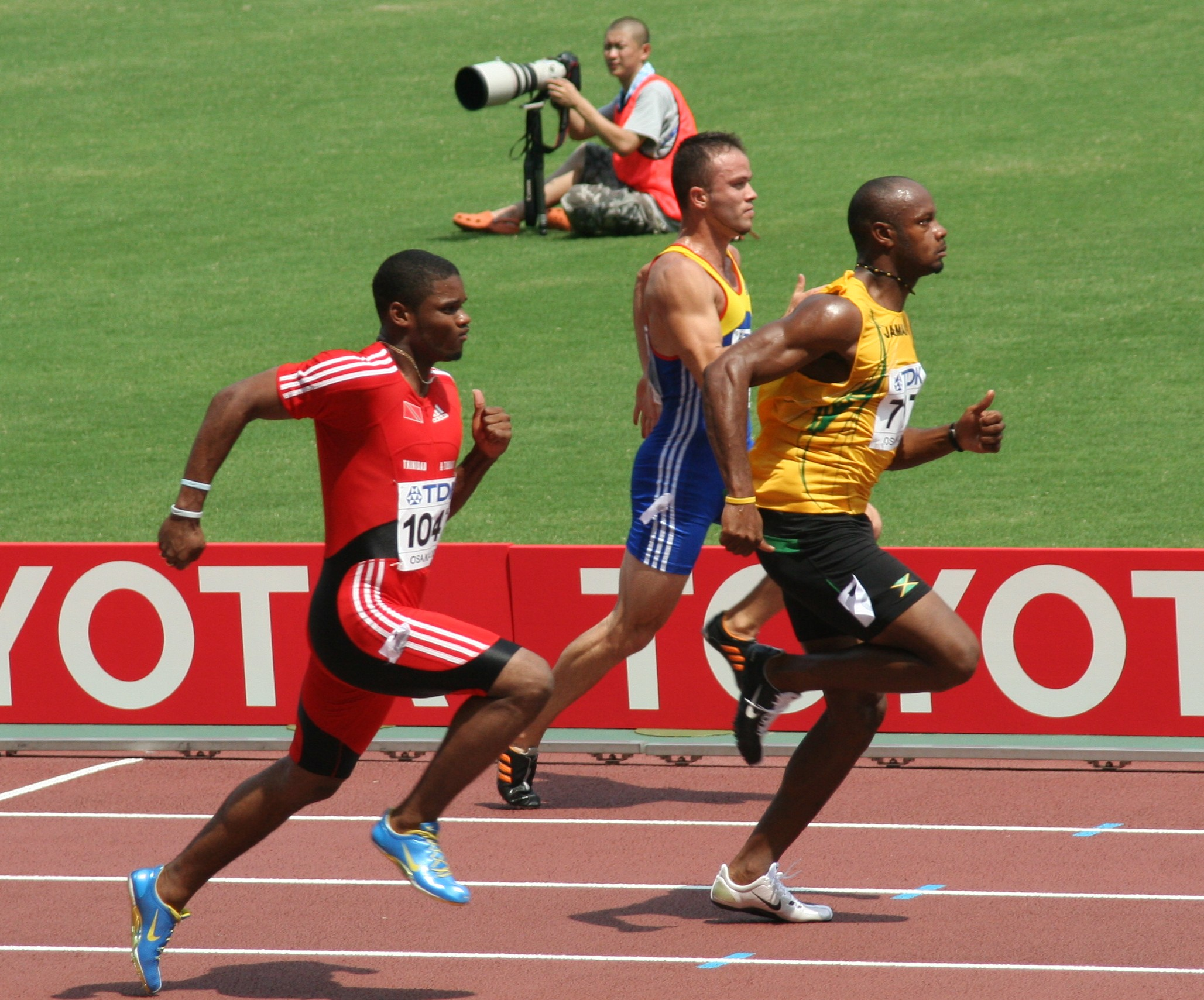
Previous world record holder Asafa Powell leading a race.

=== Great Britain ===
- Roger Bannister – first person to run the mile in less than 4 minutes.
- David Cecil, 6th Marquess of Exeter (1905–1981) – president of the IAAF for 30 years
- Sebastian Coe – retired Olympian who heads London's bid for the 2012 Summer Olympics; held all four middle distance world records simultaneously, the 800 m, 1000 m, 1500 m and the mile.
- Mo Farah CBE - Britain's most successful distance runner.

=== France ===
- Pierre de Coubertin (1863–1937) – founder of the modern Olympics

=== Morocco ===
- Hicham El Guerrouj – current holder of the 1500 metres and mile outdoor world records, as well as a double Olympic gold medalist. Ran the mile in 3:43.13 in Rome in 1999.

=== New Zealand ===
- Arthur Lydiard (1917–2004), runner and coach.

=== Senegal ===
- Lamine Diack, president of the IAAF since November 1999

=== United States ===
- Avery Brundage (1887–1975) – long-time president of the International Olympic Committee
- Ollan Cassell – long-time head of the USA Track & Field
- Ted Corbitt (1919–2007) – founder of the Road Runners Club of America and founding president of New York Road Runners. He led efforts to accurately measure and certify long distance road race courses in the United States.
- Jim Fixx – author of the 1977 best-selling book, The Complete Book of Running. He helped start America's fitness revolution, popularizing the sport of running and demonstrating the health benefits of regular jogging.
- Don Kardong – past-president of the Road Runners Club of America
- Fred Lebow (1932–1994) – long-time head of the NY Road Runners and creator of the "big city" marathon format
- Bill Rodgers – influential runner as both an open and master runner
- Steve Roland "Pre" Prefontaine (January 25, 1951 – May 30, 1975) 1971 Olympiad, lifetime runner, 1970s running icon, auto-accident death.

== See also ==
- Outline of sports
- Eco-running
- ChiRunning
- Ernst van Aaken
- London UnderRound
- Orienteering
- Racewalking
  - 20 km walk
- Wheelchair racing
