= Baldwin Hills Scenic Overlook State Park =

California State Park in Baldwin Hills, Los Angeles County

- Stairway and Visitor center
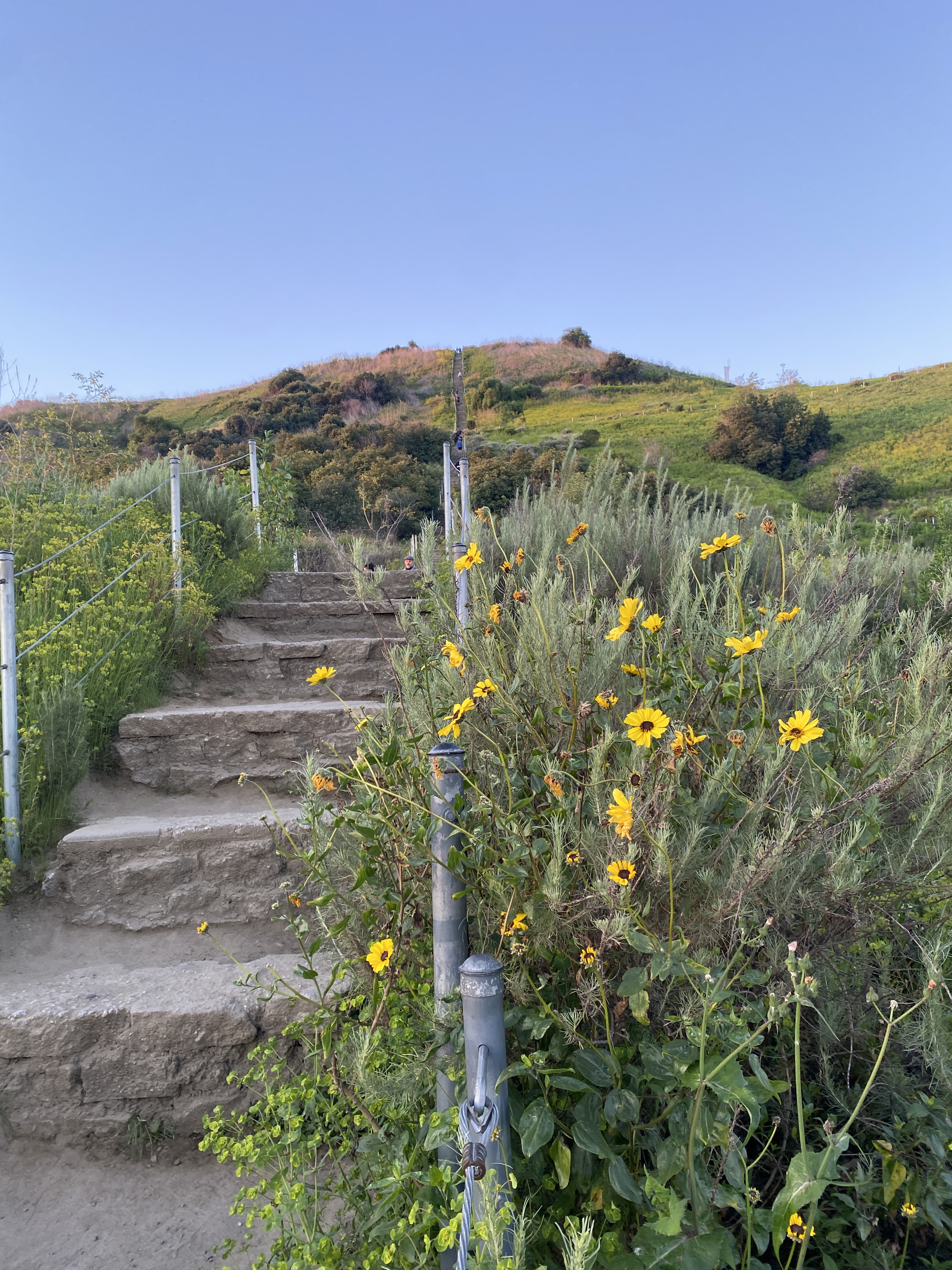
- Staircase, looking south/up (2024)
- Design: Safdie Rabines Architects (Visitor center)
- Steps: 282
- Height: 300 ft (91 m)
- Surface: Concrete
- Location: Culver City
- Address: 6300 Hetzler Road, 90232
- Location in Los Angeles
- Coordinates: 34°1′3″N 118°23′10″W

Baldwin Hills Scenic Overlook State Park is a 57-acre (0.23 km^{2}) California State Park located just southeast of downtown Culver City. The park entrance is on Jefferson Boulevard. The main hiking trail is steep and winding. A visitor center is at the top.

The site is also referred to as either the Culver City Stairs or the Jefferson Stairs. The outdoor staircase is designed into the trails leading up to a view of the greater Los Angeles area.

In addition to the stairs, there is a switchback trail that crosses the stair landings at several points. There is a paved road (for car drivers and bicyclists) up to the visitor center. The parking lot has a parallel pedestrian staircase for most of the route.

The park is being restored as a habitat with native California plants and is “home to a variety of snakes, small mammals, and birds.” It is part of the larger Park to Playa Trail that connects the Baldwin Hills parklands to the beach.

== History ==
According to the Los Angeles County Historical Directory (1988), the top of neighboring Culver City Park was "Lookout Point for the Gabrielino Indians." The land was "once the location of an oil field, with a drinking water reservoir at the top." The state of California purchased the property in 2000, then closed it to the public in the middle of 2006 to construct the trails (which include the staircase) and visitor center.

The visitor center was created by the San Diego–based Safdie Rabines Architects, whose goal in designing the overlook was to “encompass non-traditional park demographics and environments.” The duo's work has graced Southern California educational and civic projects like UC San Diego’s Eleanor Roosevelt College, the student center at UCLA, and the Otay Mesa Library.

The park reopened in April 2009 with the 282 unique, irregular steps made from recycled concrete found on-site. There is a parking lot at the top. Parking is available for a fee.

== Details ==
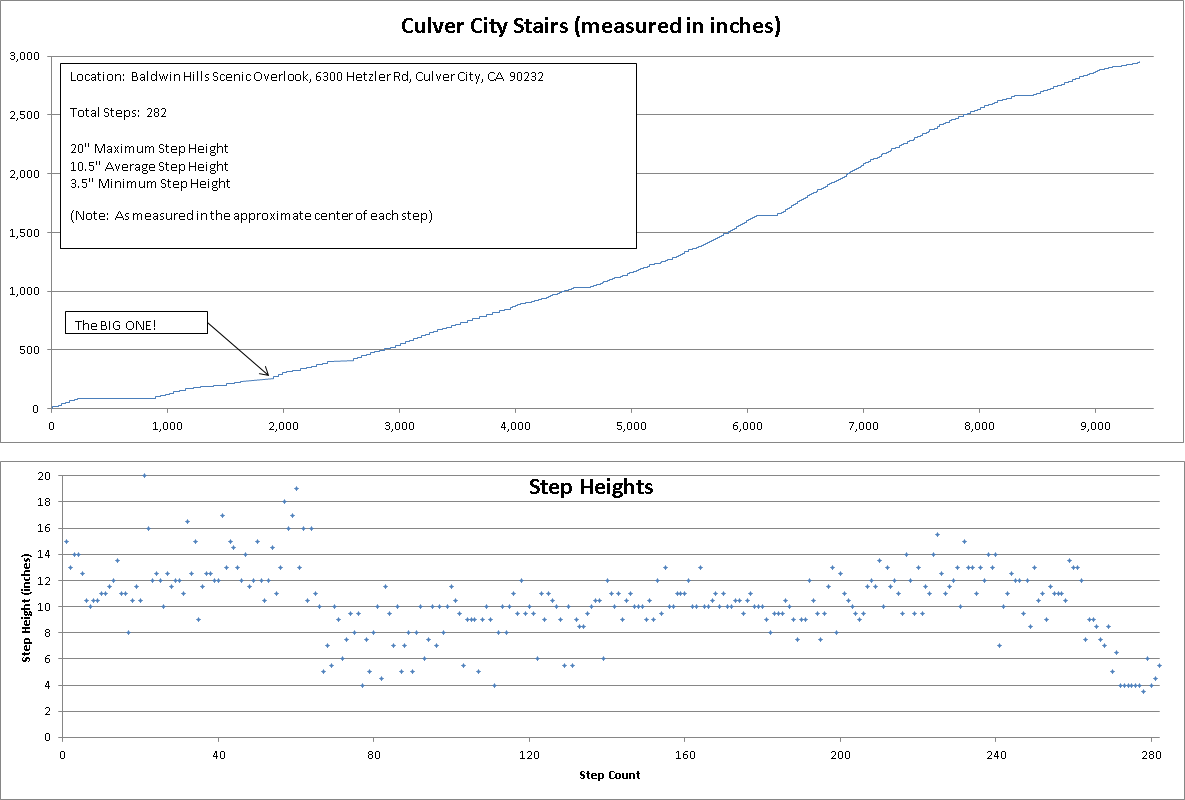
Scaled chart showing steps measured in inches.

The tallest single step measures approximately 20 inches (51 cm) (located adjacent to the only intermediate landing without a curved bench for resting). The average step height is 10.5 inches (27 cm), and the shortest is 3.5 inches (8.9 cm). An information sign posted at the trail entrance near the intersection of Jefferson Blvd. and Hetzler Rd. states that the staircase is 715 feet (218 m). In the center of the landing between the 247th and 248th steps is a bronze marker stating the elevation, surrounded by two semi-circular engravings:

Step by step, your climb expands
the cityscape a thousandfold,
framing it ever more broadly with hillside and sky.

375
FEET ABOVE
SEA LEVEL

Concrete = cement + sand + aggregate + water
= sidewalks + freeways + buildings + waterways +
What would L.A. be without concrete?

== Races ==
Beginning in 2014, Aztlan Athletics has held annual races up the stairs. The current record from this officially timed race was set in 2015 by Leony Mendez at 2:09.

Kelvin Martinez of Los Angeles, California, since 2018 has consistently been the leading presence at the staircase going up and down without stopping 10 to 13 times under 1:10:00 time frame.

== Gallery ==
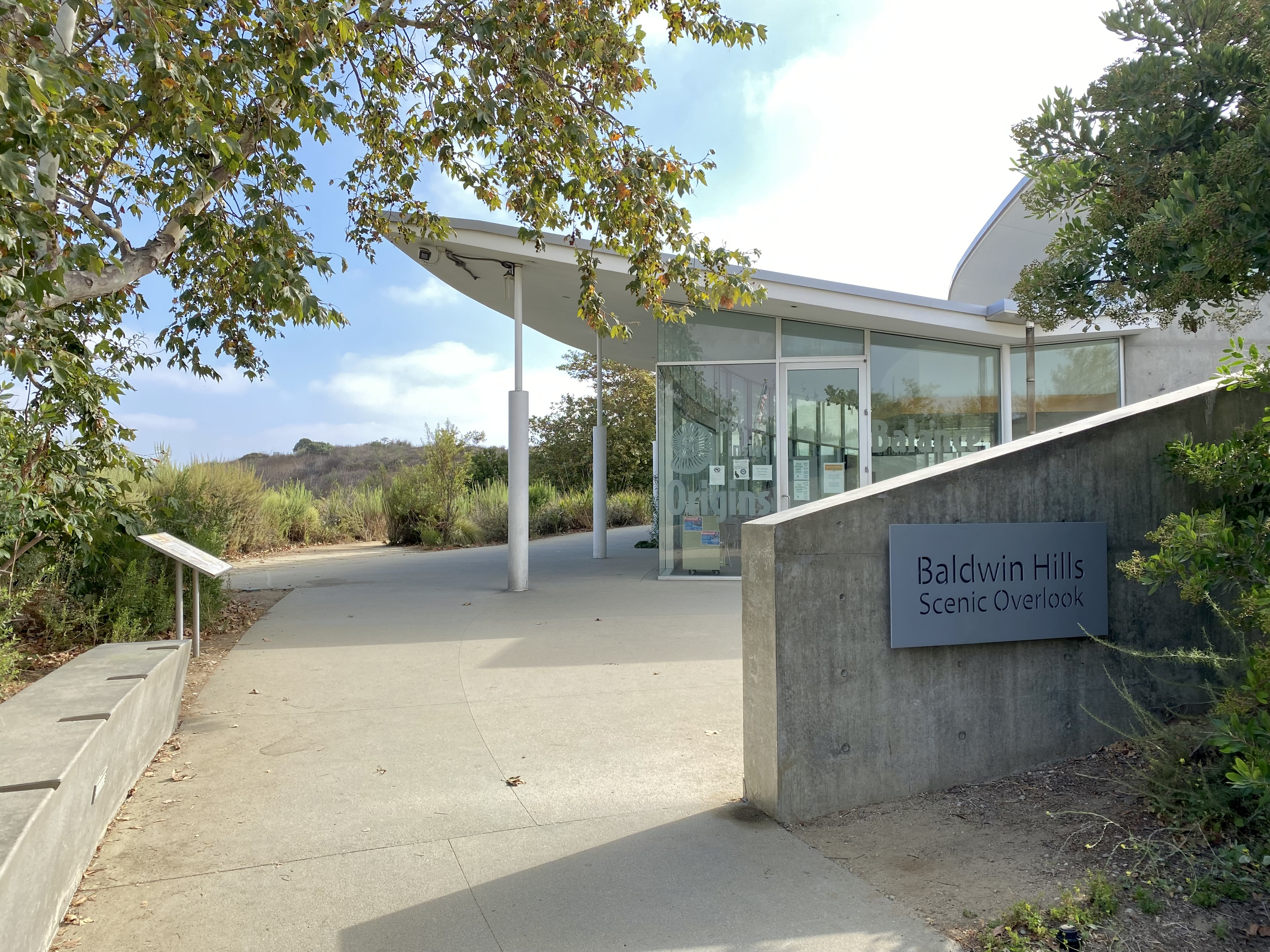
Visitor’s center with bathrooms

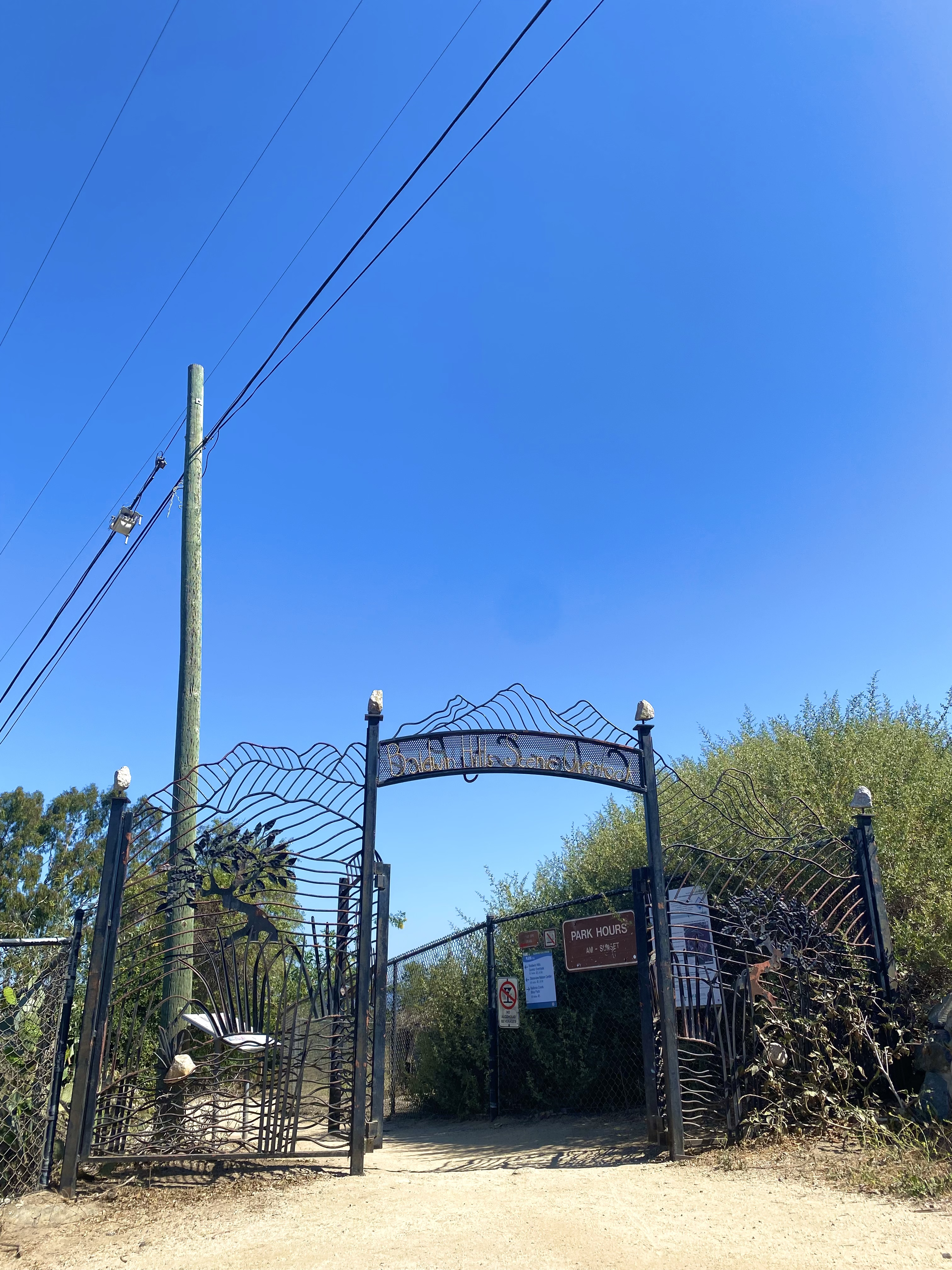
Park to Playa Trail gate

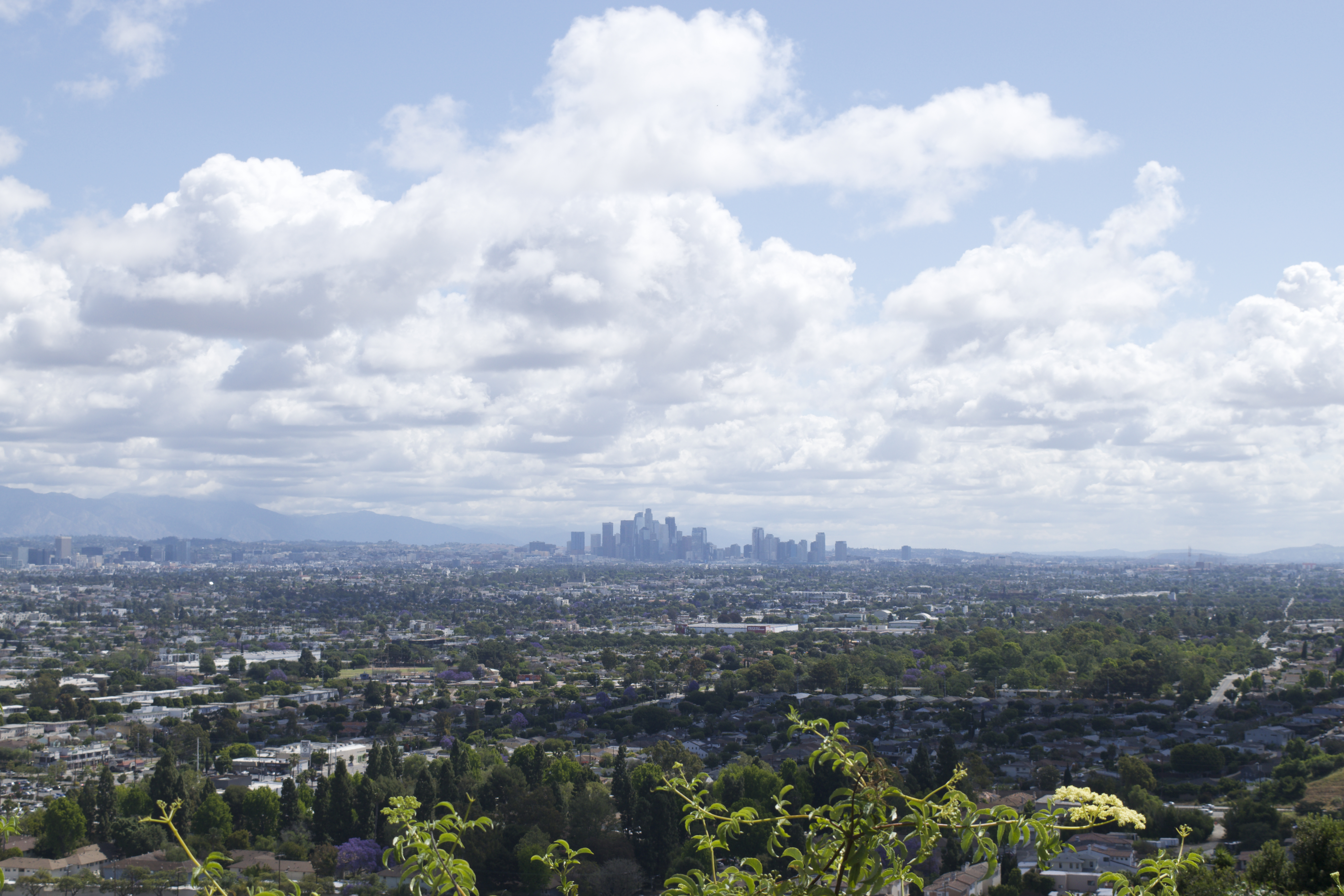
Overlook deck and view of downtown LA

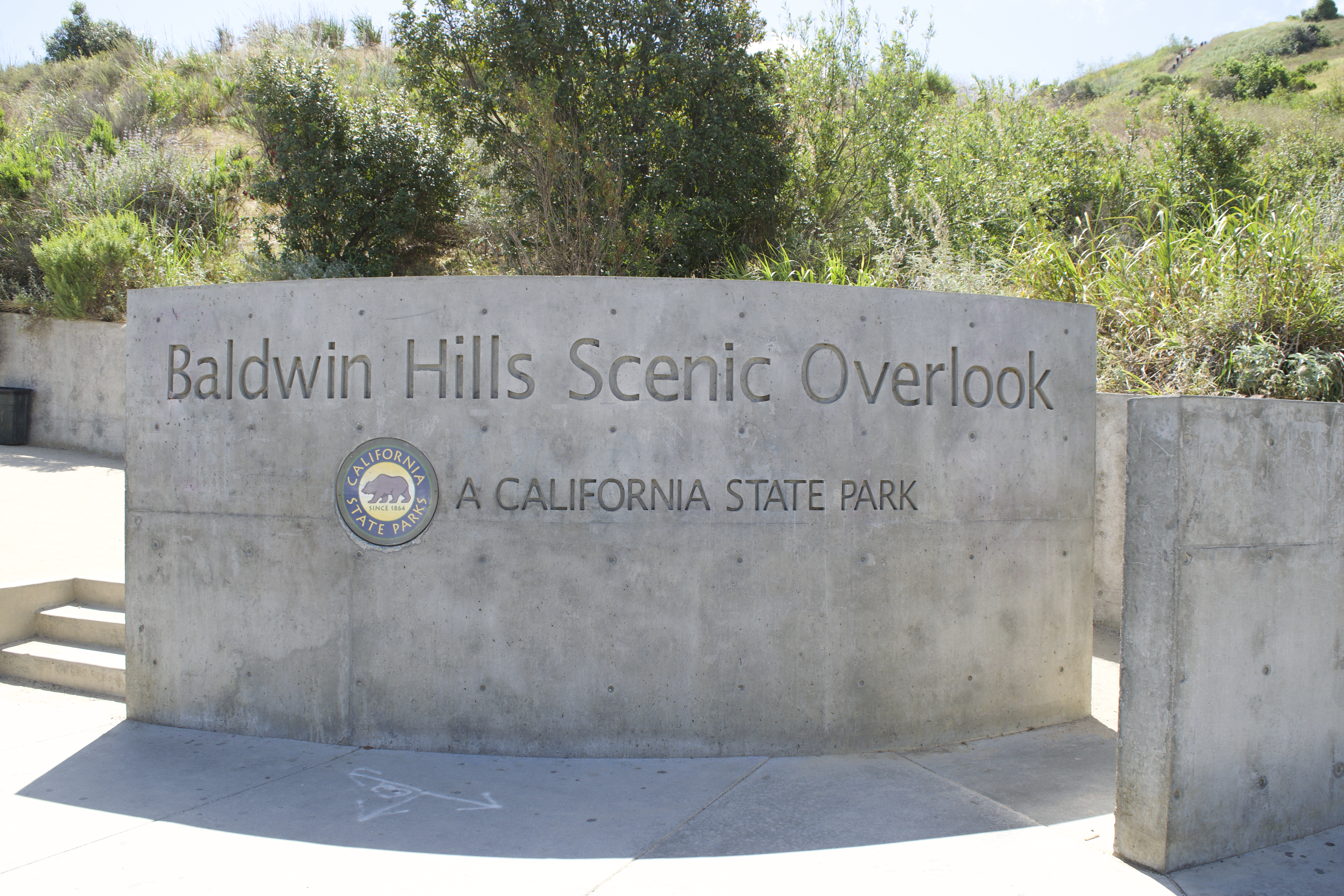
Scenic Overlook sign

== See also ==
- Santa Monica Stairs
- Stair climbing
- Tower running
- Park to Playa Trail
- California State Parks
