= Thomas Dold =

German tower, stair, and backwards runner

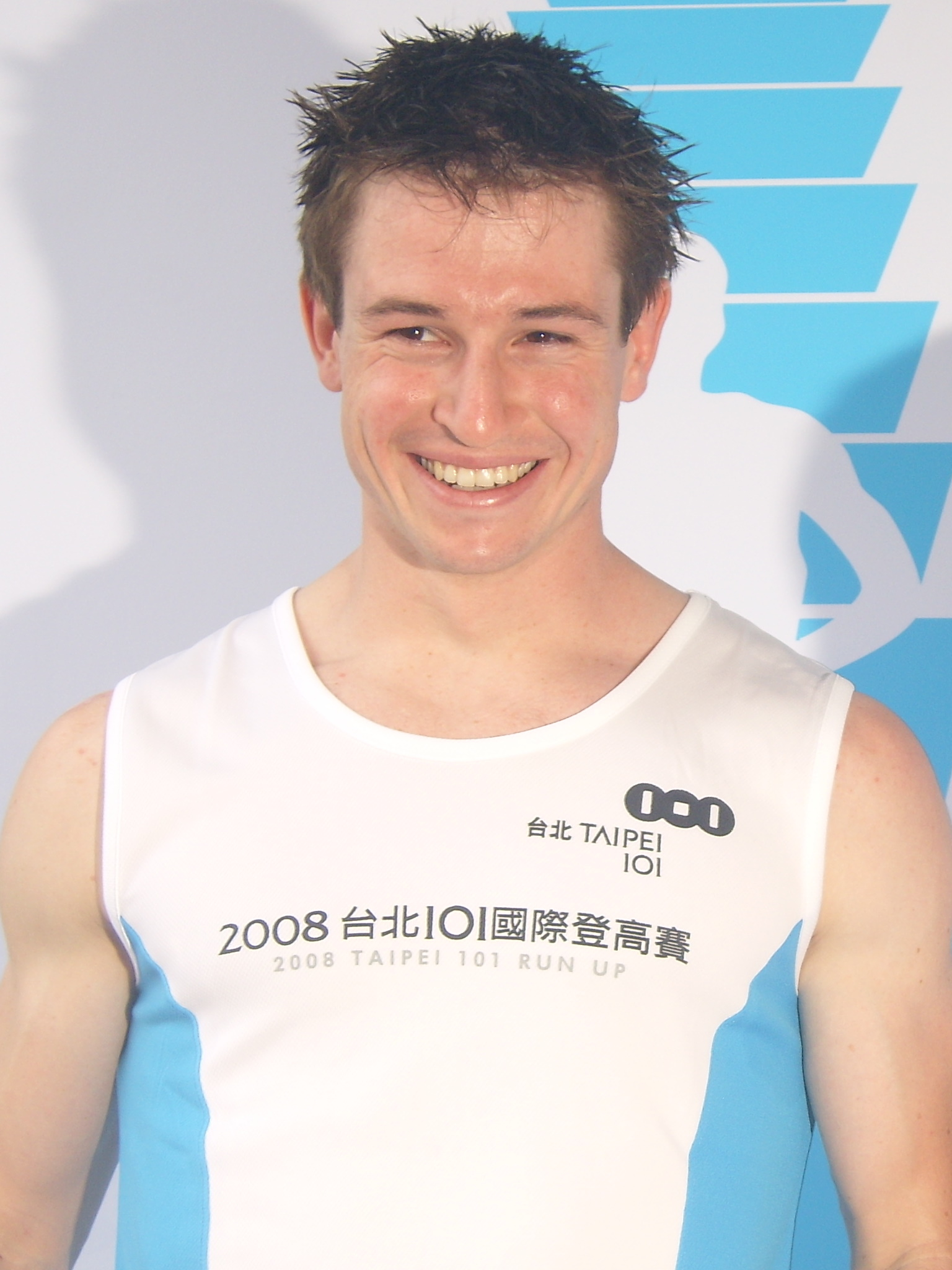
- Thomas Dold after his victory at the 2008 Taipei 101 Run Up

Personal information
- Nationality: German
- Born: September 10, 1984 (age 42) Wolfach
- Height: 176 cm (69 in) (2011)
- Weight: 71 kg (157 lb) (2011)
- Website: www.thomasdold.com

Sport
- Sport: Tower running, Stair climbing, Backward running

Thomas Dold (born September 10, 1984, in Wolfach, Baden-Württemberg) is a German track and field and extreme athlete and a tower runner, stair runner, world-record holding champion backwards runner.

Dold has competed a number of times in the most prestigious tower run of the world, the Empire State Building Run Up in New York. He first participated in 2005 and finished second. The next year he won the competition, the youngest competitor ever to do so. When he participated the third time on February 6, 2007, he was able to defend his title. In February 2008 he finished the run with his personal record time of 10 minutes, 8 seconds and won for the third time in a row. He followed it up with another win in 2009 in a time of 10 minutes and 6 seconds. On June 15, 2008, Thomas Dold won the tower run up 2,046 steps to the 91st level of Taipei 101, which was the highest skyscraper of the world at that time. It took him 10 minutes, 53 seconds.

Thomas Dold is also part of the world elite in backwards running, the so-called Retro-Running. His greatest success was winning two World Championship titles at any one time in 2006 in Rotkreuz/Switzerland and in 2008 in Pietrasanta/Italy. Currently he holds 5 world records in backwards running between 400 meters and a mile.

== Athletic career ==
=== Stair running ===
- 2004: 2nd place Donauturm Run Up, Vienna
- 2004: 1st place Uptown Run Up, Munich
- 2005: 2nd place Empire State Building Run Up, New York City
- 2005: 3rd place Donauturm Run Up, Vienna
- 2006: 1st place Empire State Building Run Up, New York
- 2006: 2nd place Taipei 101 Run Up, Taipei
- 2006: 1st place Sky Run Berlin
- 2006: 1st place Donauturm Run Up, Vienna
- 2006: 1st place Fernsehturmlauf, Stuttgart
- 2006: 1st place Towerruning, Basel
- 2007: 1st place Empire State Building Run Up, New York
- 2007: 2nd place Taipei 101 Run Up, Taipei
- 2007: 1st place Sky Run, Berlin
- 2007: 1st place Donauturm Run Up, Vienna
- 2007: 1st place Fernsehturmlauf, Stuttgart
- 2007: 2nd place Towerruning, Basel
- 2008: 1st place Empire State Building Run Up, New York
- 2008: 1st place Taipei 101 Run Up, Taipei
- 2008: 1st place Swissotel Vertical Marathon, Singapore
- 2008: 1st place Sky Run, Berlin
- 2008: 1st place Fernsehturmlauf, Stuttgart
- 2008: 1st place Pirelli Towerrun, Milan
- 2008: 1st place Towerrun, Benidorm
- 2009: 1st place Empire State Building Run Up, New York
- 2009: 1st place Sydney Tower Run Up, Sydney (7 mins 4 seconds)
- 2010: 1st place Empire State Building Run Up, New York
- 2010: Withdraw the competition Torre Colpatria Run Up, Bogotá - Colombia
- 2011: 1st place Empire State Building Run Up, New York
- 2011: 1st place SkyRun, Frankfurt
- 2011: 1st place Bitexco Vertical Run, Ho Chi Minh
- 2012: 1st place Empire State Building Run Up, New York
- 2013: 1st place China World Summit Wing Hotel Vertical Run, Beijing
- 2013: 1st place Hanoi Vertical Run, Hanoi, Vietnam
- 2015: 1st place Hanoi Vertical Run, Hanoi, Vietnam

=== Backward running ===
- 2004: German Backward Running champion
- 2005: German Backward Running champion
- 2006: Backward Running World Champion (400 and 3000 meters)
- 2008: Backward Running World Champion (400 and 3000 meters)

=== Backward running world records ===
- 2003: 1000 meters (3:32.35, broken in 2008)
- 2004: 800 meters (2:40.00, broken in 2008)
- 2005: 400 meters (1:09.56)
- 2006: 1500 meters (5:24.00)
- 2008: 1000 meters (3:20.09)
- 2008: 800 meters (2:31.30)
- 2015: 10 km (39:20)
