= Santa Monica neighborhoods =

Areas in Santa Monica, California

Coordinates: 34.0242°N 118.4802°W

Santa Monica neighborhoods lists the neighborhoods of the city of Santa Monica in the Los Angeles metropolitan area of Southern California.

== Background ==
Santa Monica is a city near Los Angeles, California defined by its location on the Pacific coast, beaches, and tourist attractions. The city is located in Los Angeles County and is west of Downtown Los Angeles.

== Santa Monica Canyon ==
The Santa Monica Canyon neighborhood is a part of the 90402 ZIP Code assigned to Santa Monica but falls outside municipal boundaries. The neighborhood is named for the historic land grant Rancho Boca de Santa Monica. The boundary between Santa Monica and Los Angeles in this area is Adelaide Drive.

== North of San Vicente / La Mesa Drive ==
Santa Monica Stairs

North of San Vicente Boulevard, the northernmost major street in Santa Monica, is an area that features some of Santa Monica's largest residential lots. The properties have views of the Riviera Country Club, Santa Monica Canyon and the Pacific Ocean. These streets are generally considered a subsection of the North of Montana neighborhood, and include La Mesa Drive, La Mesa Way, Gale Place (developed by one of the region's prolific post-Great Depression contractors, Cecil Gale), Woodacres Road, Esparta Way, Ermont Place, Foxtail Drive, Larkin Place, Winnett Place, Adelaide Drive, and Adelaide Place. Streets north of San Vicente are usually short and contain gated estates.

The area is also a part of the 90402 ZIP Code. The Santa Monica Stairs sit at 4th Street, a set of 189 steps that lead down into the canyon.

== North of Montana ==
The neighborhood north of Montana Avenue consists of larger family homes of varying styles and ages on larger lots. It is one of the most expensive areas on the Westside of Los Angeles. The streets in this portion of Santa Monica are San Vicente Boulevard, Georgina Avenue, Marguerita Avenue, Alta Avenue, Carlyle Avenue, Brentwood Terrace, Ocean Avenue, and numbered streets between 4th Street and 26th Street. Most of the properties are 7,500 square feet (700 m^{2}) on 50 by 150 feet (15 m × 46 m) lots. The streets south of San Vicente Boulevard and north of Montana Avenue provide an understated, conventional, walkable, play-in-street feel. The roads west of 7th Street are coveted for their proximity to Palisades Park and their stately homes on deep, 100' foot-wide lots. The Gillette's Regent Square tract's properties, developed by King Gillette, are 9,000 sq ft on 60' by 150' lots. Some potential home buyers covet the Gillette Regent Square section because of its larger homes, wider lots and mature street trees.

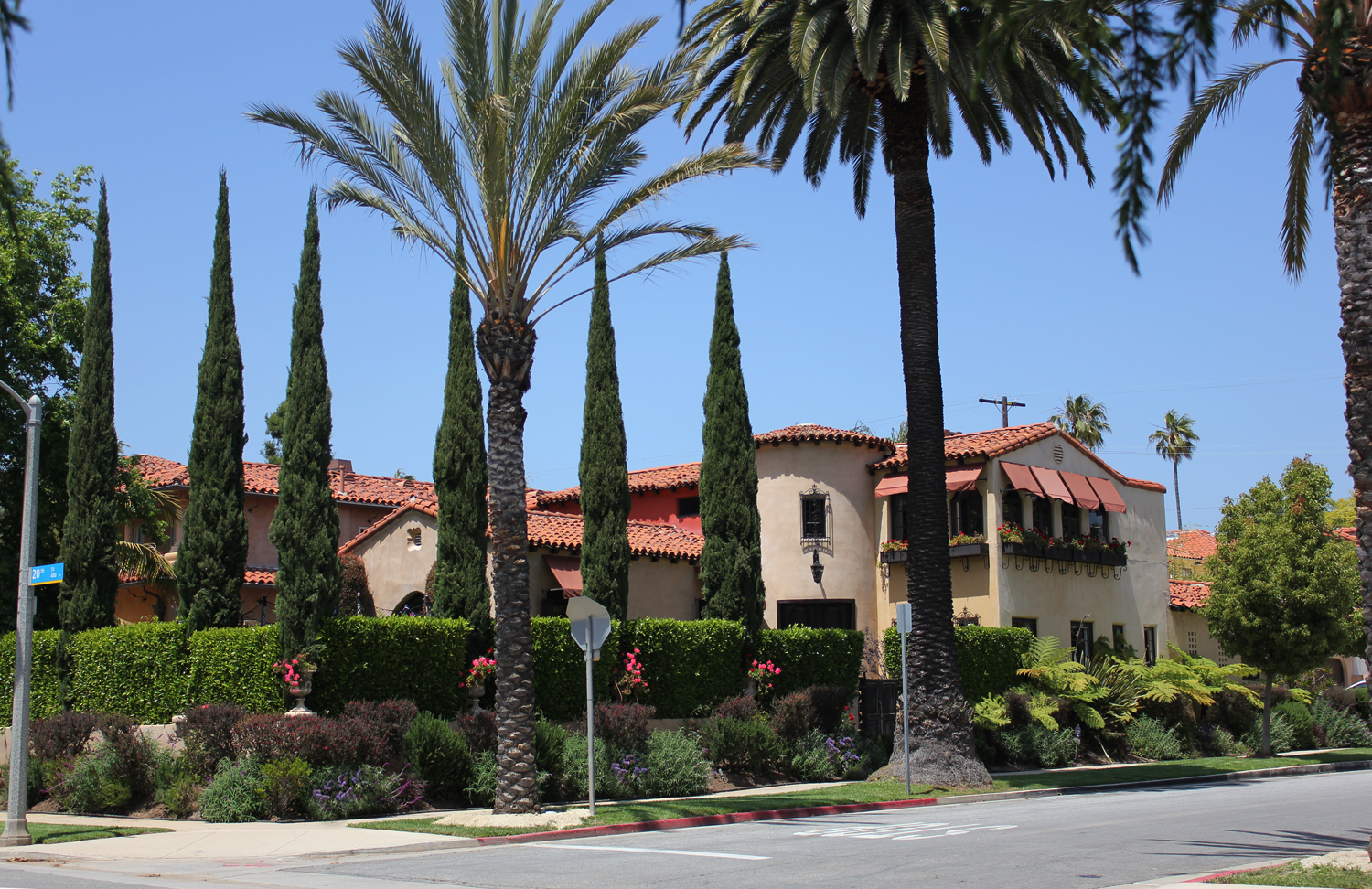
A home in the North of Montana area, Santa Monica, CA

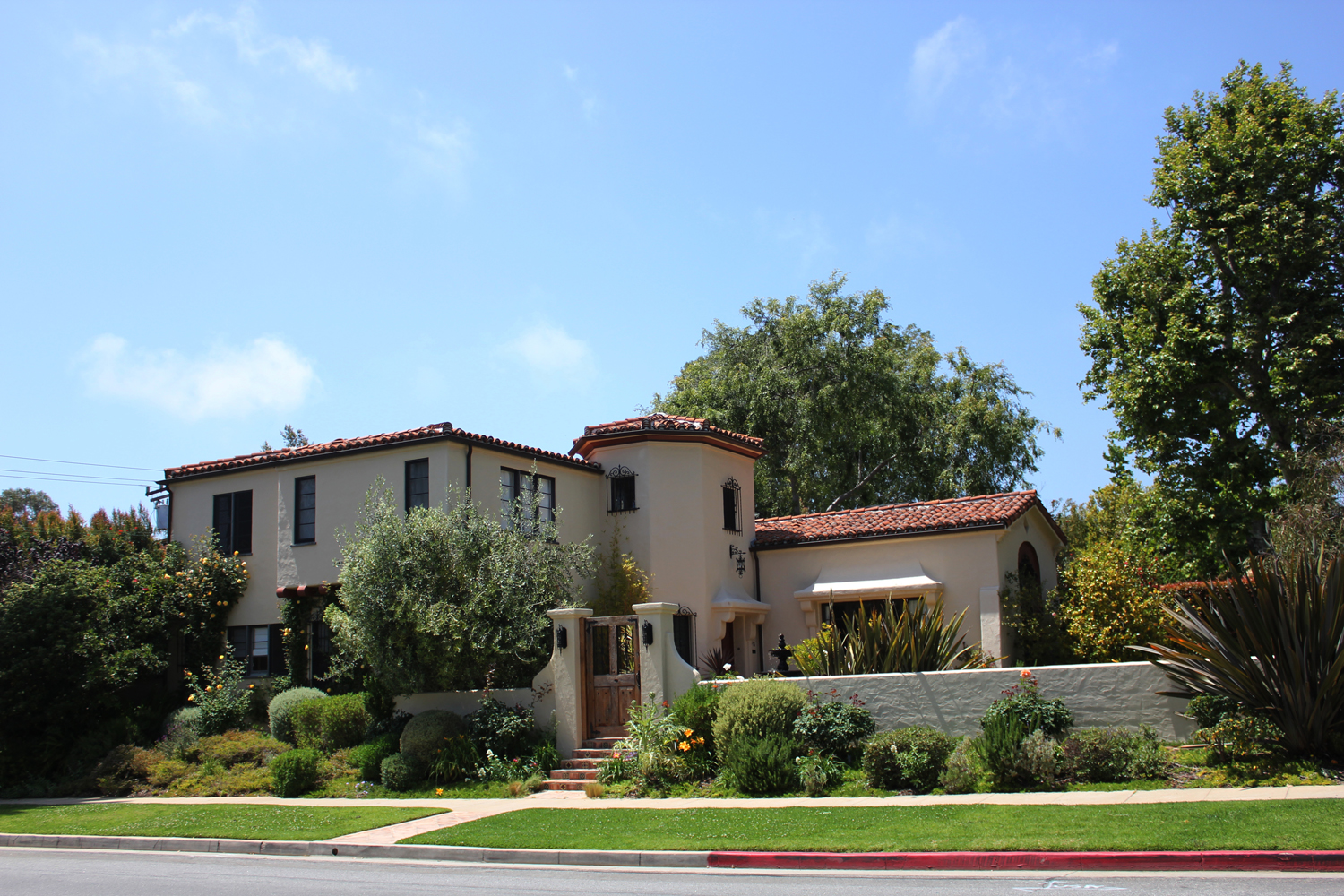
A home in the North of Montana area, Santa Monica, CA

West of 7th and east of Ocean Avenue is a neighborhood noted by 100' x 220' foot lots, some of which have been subdivided. Many of Santa Monica's historically significant homes are located here and a few appear in the National Register of Historic Places.

Two public elementary schools serve North of Montana: Franklin Elementary School for residents from 15th Street east to 26th Street, and Roosevelt Elementary School for families from 14th Street west to Ocean Avenue.

On Halloween, the neighborhood near 16th Street and Georgina Avenue is packed with trick-or-treaters, partiers and gawkers because residents put up elaborate decorations on their homes for the holiday. North of Montana is the only Santa Monica neighborhood with a privately funded 24-hour patrol service managed by the Santa Monica Protective Association. The neighborhood is not represented by an association, but there is an active, organized anti-growth group.

North of Montana, published by Alfred A. Knopf, is also the first book in a mystery series written by Santa Monica resident April Smith. Continuously in print since 1994, the book is a fast-paced thriller that examines complex relationships between upper-class white women and the Hispanic caretakers of their children.

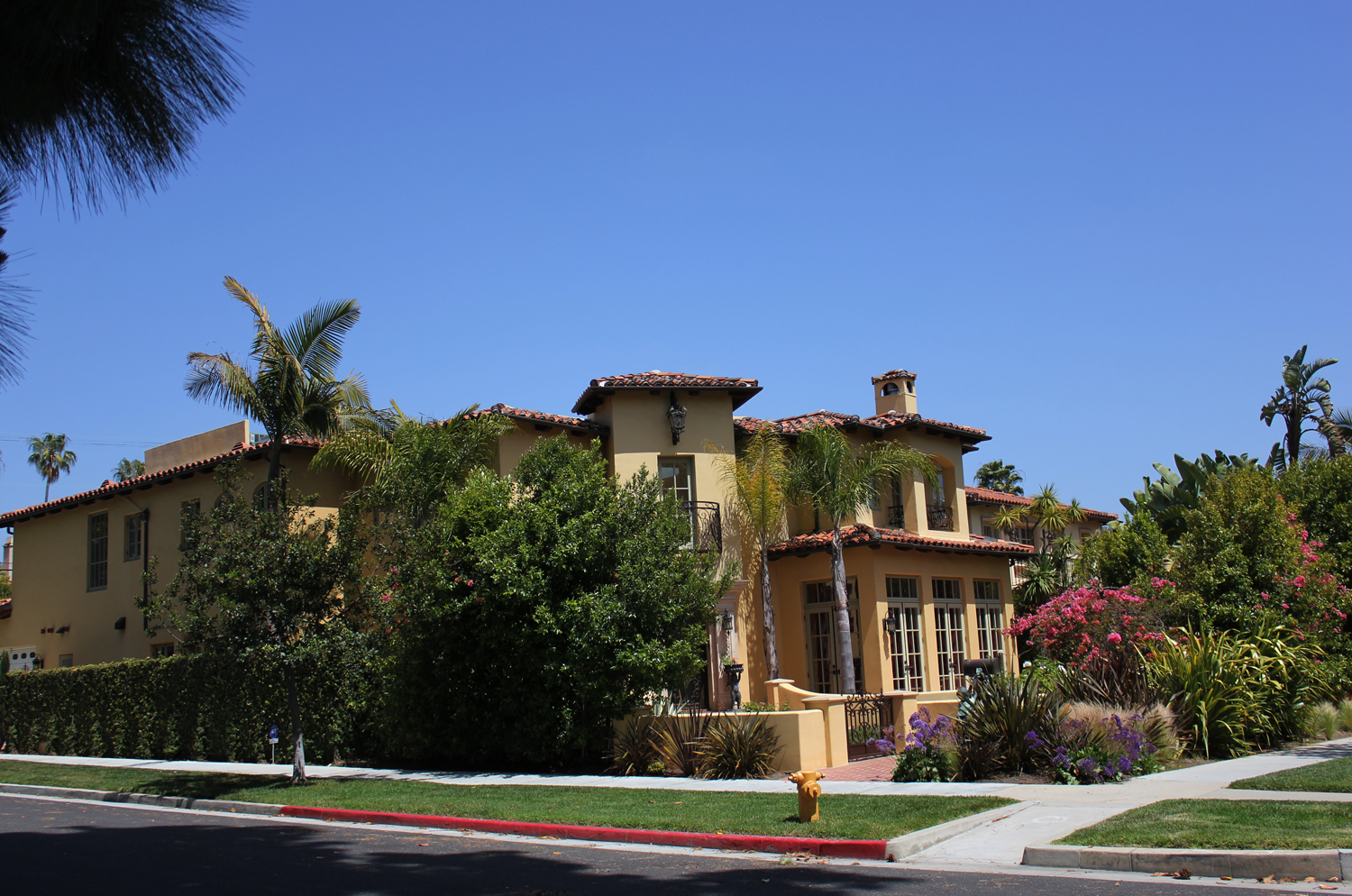
A home in the North of Montana area, Santa Monica, CA

== Montana Avenue ==
Montana Avenue is home to two elementary schools, a public library, and a mile of about 150 businesses, including upscale stores, banks, real estate offices and restaurants. There are several independently owned cafes as well as nationally known coffee chains. The businesses on the street are generally boutiques, along with two national markets.

Montana Avenue also features the 1939 landmark Aero Theater, built by the Donald Douglas Company as an around-the-clock movie theater. It is now a repertory theater operated by The American Cinematheque.

Every December and June, the Montana Avenue Association hosts a neighborhood-wide sale and festival during which stores offer holiday discounts, give out free samples of food and have clearance sales. Montana Avenue is served by the 18 line of the Big Blue Bus.

== Northeast Neighbors ==
North of Wilshire Boulevard and south of Montana Avenue is a primarily residential neighborhood. Laid out on a consistent grid of numbered streets, there are many mid-sized homes and condominiums. On its westernmost end, the neighborhood includes a number of well-preserved Victorian duplex houses. Smaller Craftsman bungalows line the east-west roads like Idaho Avenue, Washington Avenue, and California Avenue. At the corner of Washington Avenue and 22nd Street is the original Gehry House, a deconstructionist masterpiece that signaled a dramatic shift in Frank Gehry's architectural style. Real estate is expensive in this neighborhood, albeit slightly less expensive than the more stately properties north of Montana. The neighborhood is represented by the Northeast Neighbors neighborhood association.

== Ocean Avenue ==
Ocean Avenue is a major thoroughfare in Santa Monica that runs along Palisades Park, with a view of the Pacific Ocean. Ocean Avenue real estate is highly prized, as all residences have a full view of the beach and Pacific Ocean. Some homes have views stretching from Palos Verdes all the way to Malibu.

Several luxury hotels are south of California Avenue, like Shore Hotel, Ocean View Hotel, Shutters, Casa del Mar, The Shangri-La, The Georgian Hotel, The Huntley, The Fairmont Miramar, Hotel Oceana, The Viceroy and Loews. The Santa Monica Pier is located at Ocean Avenue and Colorado Avenue.

== Downtown Santa Monica ==
Downtown Santa Monica is located south of Wilshire Boulevard. The streets that make up downtown Santa Monica are Wilshire Boulevard, Arizona Avenue, Santa Monica Boulevard, Broadway, and Colorado Avenue from 2nd Street to 14th Street. The Third Street Promenade and Santa Monica Place are located in the heart of downtown. Many restaurants, tourist sites and hotels are in downtown Santa Monica.

== Midtown Santa Monica ==
Comprising most of the 90404 ZIP Code, Midtown Santa Monica stretches from 14th Street to Centinela Avenue east to west and Wilshire Boulevard to Olympic Boulevard north-south. Alternating between major thoroughfares and quieter residential lanes, Midtown is less congested than many other parts of the city. Planned on a regular grid, the neighborhood was once home to a number of picturesque Craftsman houses and brightly painted Victorians, though only occasional examples of these can still be found. In the early 1940s, the first wave of suburbanization overtook this part of the city and many preexisting structures were razed and replaced with tiny, square California Bungalows with green lawns and small, private backyards. In the 1960s, a large number of these increasingly dilapidated structures were demolished in favor of four- and five-unit buildings.

The easternmost edge of Midtown Santa Monica represents one of the city's primary gateways. The Big Wave, a sculpture by Tony De Lap, arches over Wilshire Boulevard near Franklin Street and marks the border between Santa Monica and Los Angeles.

== Pico ==
The Pico neighborhood was much larger and an important African-American enclave on the Westside, but when the Santa Monica Freeway opened in the 1960s, it resulted in the destruction of many residences and the relocation of many families. Its boundaries are Lincoln Boulevard to the west, Centinela Avenue to the east, Olympic Avenue to the north and Pico Boulevard to the south. The Santa Monica Freeway runs through the area with access near both Lincoln Boulevard and Olympic Boulevard. Santa Monica High School and Santa Monica College are both on Pico Boulevard. The road in Santa Monica has traffic lights at nearly every block, as well as businesses.

During the era of racial segregation, Pico was one of the only neighborhoods in Santa Monica where nonwhite residents were permitted to live and own property. It is the most ethnically diverse area of Santa Monica, but its diversity is under threat as it is rapidly becoming gentrified. However, due to Santa Monica's rent control laws, many long-term renters have been able to stay despite rising market prices.

While the Santa Monica has a low crime rate compared to surrounding communities, the Pico neighborhood has higher crime rates than the rest of the city. The city's government has been accused of ignoring the area in the past, particularly when it came to issues regarding crime and gang activity.

== Ocean Park ==
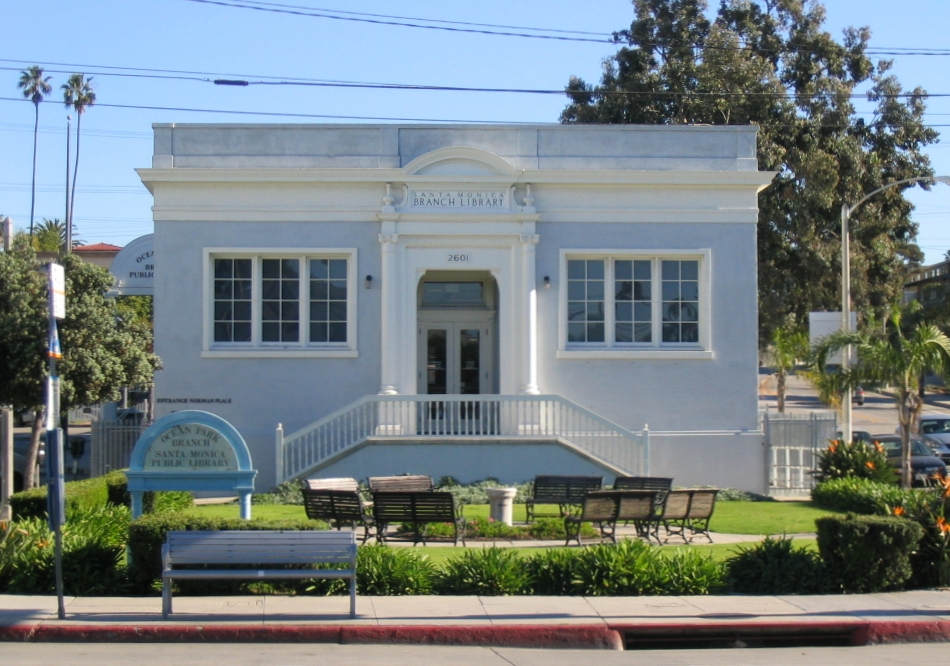
Ocean Park branch library, an original Carnegie library.

The Ocean Park neighborhood sits in the southwest corner of Santa Monica, stretching from the beach east to Lincoln Boulevard and between Pico Boulevard and the southern city limits. It is also known, together with the northern portion of Venice, as Dogtown. One of the oldest parts of the city, it is home to many styles of buildings typical of the early 20th century, such as Craftsman and Victorian houses and apartment buildings. There are also many mid-century apartment complexes and newer, higher-end homes.

The area has a beachy, artsy feel similar to Venice. Like its neighbor, Ocean Park was predominantly working and middle class, but has become much wealthier and more expensive since the 1990s.

Ocean Park was originally founded as an independent city with the involvement of Abbot Kinney. It was home to an oceanfront boardwalk and pleasure pier, which were later developed into Pacific Ocean Park as part of an urban renewal program. Two high-rise apartment towers, along with a few low-rise condominium complexes and the park, were built in their place.

Many Santa Monica residents come to shop on Main Street. The road is home to many boutiques, bars, and restaurants. Main Street also hosts a weekly farmer's market on Sundays. Santa Monica Alternative School House and John Muir Elementary School are located in the neighborhood. Olympic High School, an alternative high school, is also located in the area. The neighborhood association is Ocean Park Association.

== Sunset Park ==
Sunset Park is a residential neighborhood located between Pico Boulevard and the southern city limits and Lincoln Boulevard and the eastern city limits. It is composed primarily of single-family housing. Most of the homes are small one-story houses built in the 1940s for workers at the Douglas Aircraft Factory. Remodeled or rebuilt homes are upscale.

Sunset Park is part of the Santa Monica-Malibu Unified School District. The Will Rogers and Grant Elementary Schools as well as John Adams Middle School are located in the neighborhood. Santa Monica College, a two-year community college, is also located in Sunset Park.

Santa Monica Airport, one of the busiest single-runway airports in the nation, is located along the southern border of the neighborhood. The airport will close at the end of 2028.

Clover Park is a large park in the area with recreation facilities. The neighborhood is represented by the Friends of Sunset Park association.

== Thoroughfares ==
Major east-west thoroughfares in Santa Monica are San Vicente Boulevard, Wilshire Boulevard, Santa Monica Boulevard, Olympic Boulevard, Pico Boulevard, and Ocean Park Boulevard. All of these streets are four lanes in width; however, about half of Ocean Park Boulevard was recently reduced to two general lanes in order to accommodate left-turn lanes. Wilshire Boulevard and Santa Monica Boulevard carry the most traffic. It is fairly easy to travel east-west in Santa Monica.

Traveling north-south in Santa Monica is considerably slower and more difficult. Most north-south roads in the city end relatively quickly, making travel difficult during rush hour. The major streets are Ocean Avenue and Lincoln Boulevard — which goes to Los Angeles International Airport. Those two streets are mostly four lanes. In particular, Lincoln Boulevard becomes congested since it is a main route that leads to the Santa Monica Freeway, Venice, and Marina del Rey.

A number of smaller residential streets allow north-south travel through Santa Monica. Those streets are: 7th Street from Olympic Boulevard to the Pacific Coast Highway, 11th Street from San Vicente Boulevard to Dewey Street, 14th and 20th Streets from San Vicente Boulevard to Ocean Park Boulevard, and 26th Street from San Vicente Boulevard to Olympic Boulevard, where most traffic diverts onto Cloverfield Boulevard. All of those streets are only two lanes — with the exception of a brief portion of 20th Street. However, the streets encounter traffic lights at all intersections, making travel plausible. One alternate route to reach the Santa Monica Freeway going eastbound is to take Cloverfield Boulevard, a short four-lane street that begins off Santa Monica Boulevard.
