= Dwayne Fernandes =

Australian Amputee

- Born: 1985 (age 39–40); Bombay, India
- Website: http://dwaynefernandes.com.au/

Dwayne Fernandes is an Indian-born Australian who holds eight world records for being a double-amputee stair climber competing in the sport of tower running. Fernandes is an advocate for people with disability, and in much of his adult life has worked in various roles focussing on diversity, equity and inclusion in the workplace and in society.

Fernandes also sits on the board of the volunteer based community organisation, Amputees NSW, as the vice president.

== Personal life ==
Born with fibular hemimelia, a severe bone defect in both legs, Fernandes had five surgeries before he was three years of age. By the time he was 11, he underwent further surgery to have both his legs removed below the knee, allowing him to be able to wear prosthetics.

== Professional life ==
Fernandes co-founded a business in 2019 that delivers online social gaming experiences using table top role playing games such as Dungeons & Dragons and other digital games like Minecraft to help build social and communication skills which has been popular with people diagnosed with Autism Spectrum Disorder.

== Stair climbing and retro running ==
Fernandes competed in his first international stair climbing marathon in 2008 completing the 1,504 stair Sydney Tower climb in 23.49 minutes. This achievement set the first world record for amputees. Since then, he has competed in a variety of other tower climbs all around the world to raise awareness of the capability of people with disabilities (PwD).

In addition to competing and setting records as an amputee in stair climbing events, Fernandes also set world records in the 100m and 200m double leg amputee disciplines of the Retro Running (also known as backwards running) World Championships (2016) that took place in Essen, Germany.

== Disability inclusion in space ==
In September 2022, Fernandes was chosen as an ambassador and flight crew member for a parabolic flight in Houston, Texas with AstroAccess, an organisation dedicated to promoting disability inclusion in space exploration. The flight took place on the 50th anniversary of the Apollo 17 mission. A research lead from AstroAccess says, "The work that we're doing at AstroAccess is laying the foundation for the future of human spaceflight. To democratize space, we're expanding the notion of 'the right stuff' and doing the necessary research for inclusion to enable a wide range of people to fly." Leading up to the flight, Fernandes participated in a panel discussion at the International Humans In Space Summit held at UTS in Sydney, Australia, talking about the need to support humans in space, and the challenges and potential solutions required.
