= Towerrunning World Championships =

World championship event for the sport of tower running

- Status: Active
- Genre: World championships tower running
- Inaugurated: 2015
- Organiser: Towerrunning World Association
- Website: towerrunning.com

The Towerrunning World Championships is a global tower running competition organised by the Towerrunning World Association (TWA), the global body for competitive stair climbing. The first edition was held in 2015, and the second edition was held in 2018. It became part of the TWA's Towerrunning Tour for its third edition in 2020, although that competition was postponed due to the COVID-19 pandemic. The venues for the championships are skyscrapers that host annual competitions, with the Aspire Tower and Taipei 101 hosting the 2015 and 2018 events, respectively.

== Editions ==
Edition	Year	City	Country	Date	Venue	Men's champion	Women's champion
1	2015	Doha	Qatar	27–28 March	Aspire Tower	Piotr Lobodzinski	Andrea Mayr
2	2018	Taipei	Taiwan	5 May	Taipei 101	Piotr Lobodzinski	Suzy Walsham
—	2020	Taipei	Taiwan	9 May	Taipei 101	Cancelled	
3	2024	Taipei	Taiwan	4 May	Taipei 101	Soh Wai Ching	Valentia Belotti
