= Plennie L. Wingo =

American man who walked backwards from Santa Monica, California to Istanbul, Turkey

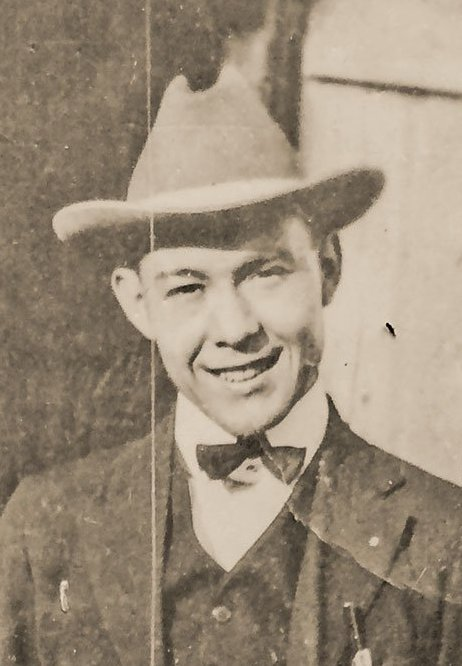
- Wingo c. 1919
- Born: Plennie Lawrence Wingo; January 24, 1895
- Died: October 2, 1993 (aged 98)
- Known for: Walking backwards from Santa Monica, California to Istanbul, Turkey

Plennie Lawrence Wingo (January 24, 1895 – October 2, 1993) was an American man who walked backwards from Santa Monica, California to Istanbul, Turkey, about 8,000 miles (13,000 km), from April 15, 1931 to October 24, 1932, at the age of 36. He remains the Guinness record holder for "greatest extent of reverse pedestrianism".

== Biography ==
Plennie L. Wingo owned a small diner in Abilene, Texas, but it closed with the onset of the Great Depression and Wingo was out of work like much of America in 1931. At the time, "stunts" were commonplace such as flagpole sitting, or Bill Williams who pushed a peanut up Pikes Peak with his nose. Wingo overheard some children say everything had been done, there was nothing left to do, to which Wingo spontaneously responded no one had ever walked around the world backwards. The idea stuck with him, and he thought the stunt could be a way to make some money. He bought a pair of reverse-looking mirrored glasses and trained with a local doctor and on April 15, 1931, facing west, set out east.

Wingo had little money and depended on the kindness of strangers and the selling of signed postcards for twenty-five cents to anyone who stopped and asked him what he was doing walking backwards (he would return 18 months later with $4 to his name). He was often stopped by police but carried copies of local newspaper articles describing his stunt. In New York City, he agreed to walk around the top ledge of a 12-story building in return for money, but he was robbed by a partner. Wingo eventually found the thief, beat him up, and ended up in jail but the judge let him go on learning of the circumstances. Wingo walked to Boston where he took working passage on a ship to Germany under a cruel chief steward who worked Wingo mercilessly. From there he walked through Germany south to Turkey where he was told by authorities that he had to leave the country for his own safety. A wealthy Italian paid for his return to Santa Monica, California where he then walked backwards to Abilene. He wore-out 13 pairs of shoes on the trip.

Although Wingo often made local newspapers on his journey, his fame quickly faded. Years later, he documented his voyage in the book Around the World Backwards. It was published in 1966 with a small publisher that did not sell many copies, but re-released it in 1982 under a new publisher and cover. In July 1976 at the age of 81, he walked across the width of California, selling postcards for a dollar. In preparation Wingo managed to "talk his way" onto the Johnny Carson Show (July 20, 1976) which paid him $342 for the appearance. He died at home age 98 on October 2, 1993, and is buried in Wichita Falls, Texas.

== Legacy ==
A biography of Wingo was published in 2018 by Ben Montgomery, titled The Man Who Walked Backward: An American Dreamer's Search for Meaning in the Great Depression. He remains the Guinness record holder for "greatest extent of reverse pedestrianism". His story was told by The Dollop Podcast, episode 493.

== See also ==
- List of pedestrian circumnavigators
- Backward running
