= Santa Monica Stairs =

Outdoor stairways in Santa Monica, California, United States

- Stairways
- {{{other_names}}}
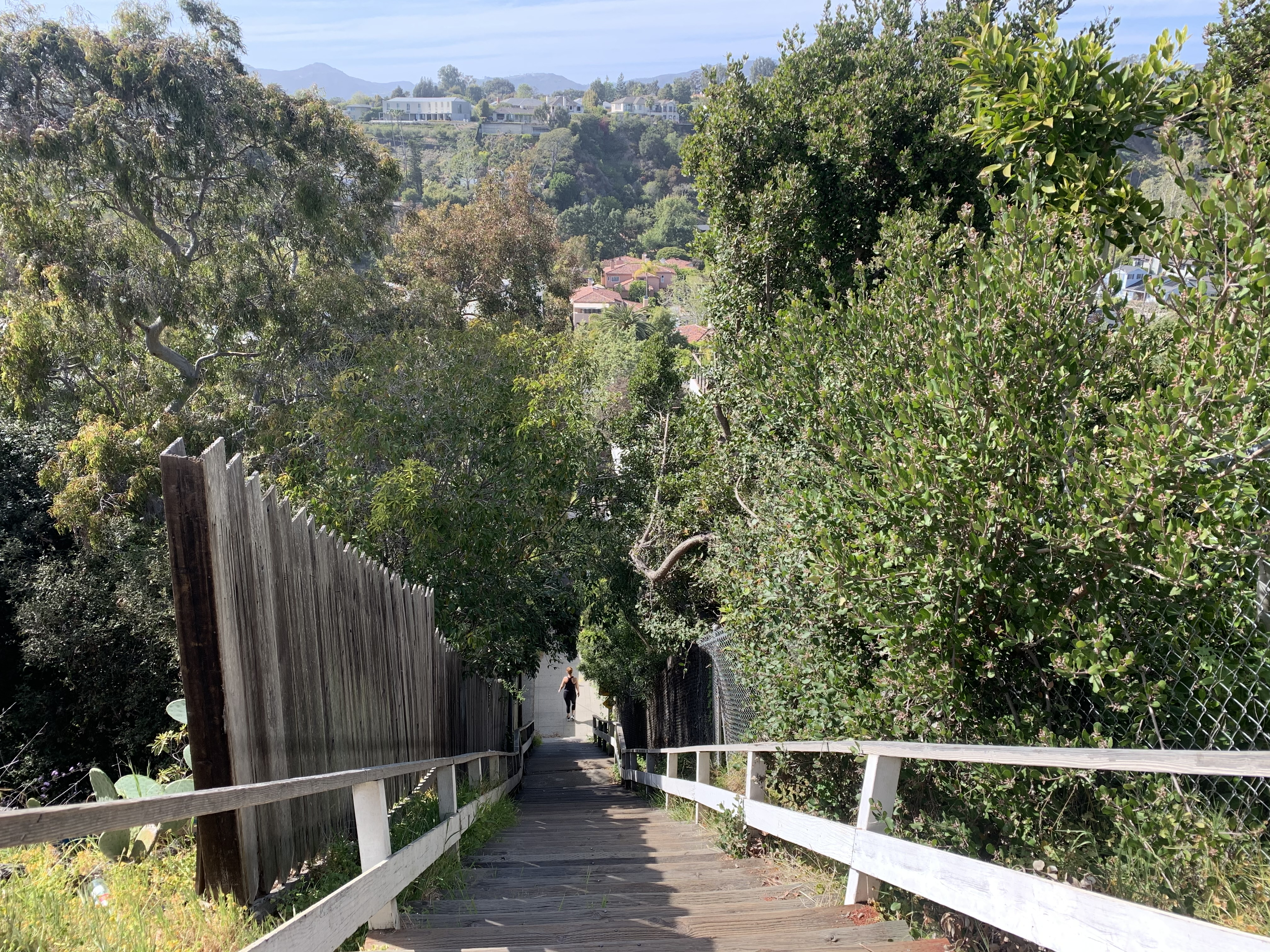
- The stairs descending from Adelaide Drive
- Steps: 170 (500 block Adelaide–Entrada); 189 (4th Ave–Ocean Ave Ext)
- Height: 110 feet (34 m) (500 block Adelaide–Entrada); 115 feet (35 m) (4th Ave–Ocean Ave Ext)
- Surface: Concrete, wood
- Location: Santa Monica, California, United States
- Interactive map of Santa Monica Stairs
- Coordinates: 34°1′55″N 118°30′38″W

The "Santa Monica Stairs" refer primarily to a pair of outdoor stairways in California descending to the northwest from Adelaide Drive in Santa Monica, to Santa Monica Canyon in Los Angeles.

== Canyon stairs ==
The two well-known stairways descend from Santa Monica to Los Angeles (Santa Monica Canyon). The mis-named "7th Street stairway" has its upper end across from 526 Adelaide Drive, and leads down to Entrada Drive, across the street from Amalfi Drive. It consists of 152 wooden steps and 18 concrete steps in a straight path, about 5.5 feet wide, separated by three horizontal landings. Altogether the 170 steps produce an overall vertical change of about 110 feet.

The "4th-street stairway" begins at the intersection of 4th Street and Adelaide, leading down to Ocean Avenue Extension. It consists solely of concrete flights interconnected by right- and left-hand turns. There are 189 steps producing an overall vertical change of about 115 feet.

On the Pacific Palisades side of Santa Monica Canyon is the so-called "secret Mesa stairway", which is much less used although it has more steps than either of the above. The base is on Mesa Road, next to 404 Mesa and about a 10-minute walk from West Channel Road. 201 concrete steps rise about 100 feet to the intersection of Upper Mesa Road and Amalfi Drive. There is no railing except for the topmost 18 steps, so descending requires caution. (The stairs are sometimes incorrectly called the "La Mesa stairs"--La Mesa Drive is elsewhere in Santa Monica, and there is a La Mesa Stairway in the city of La Mesa in San Diego County.)

Public transit access to the Santa Monica Canyon stairs is available via Metro Los Angeles bus 534 and Santa Monica Big Blue Bus line 9.

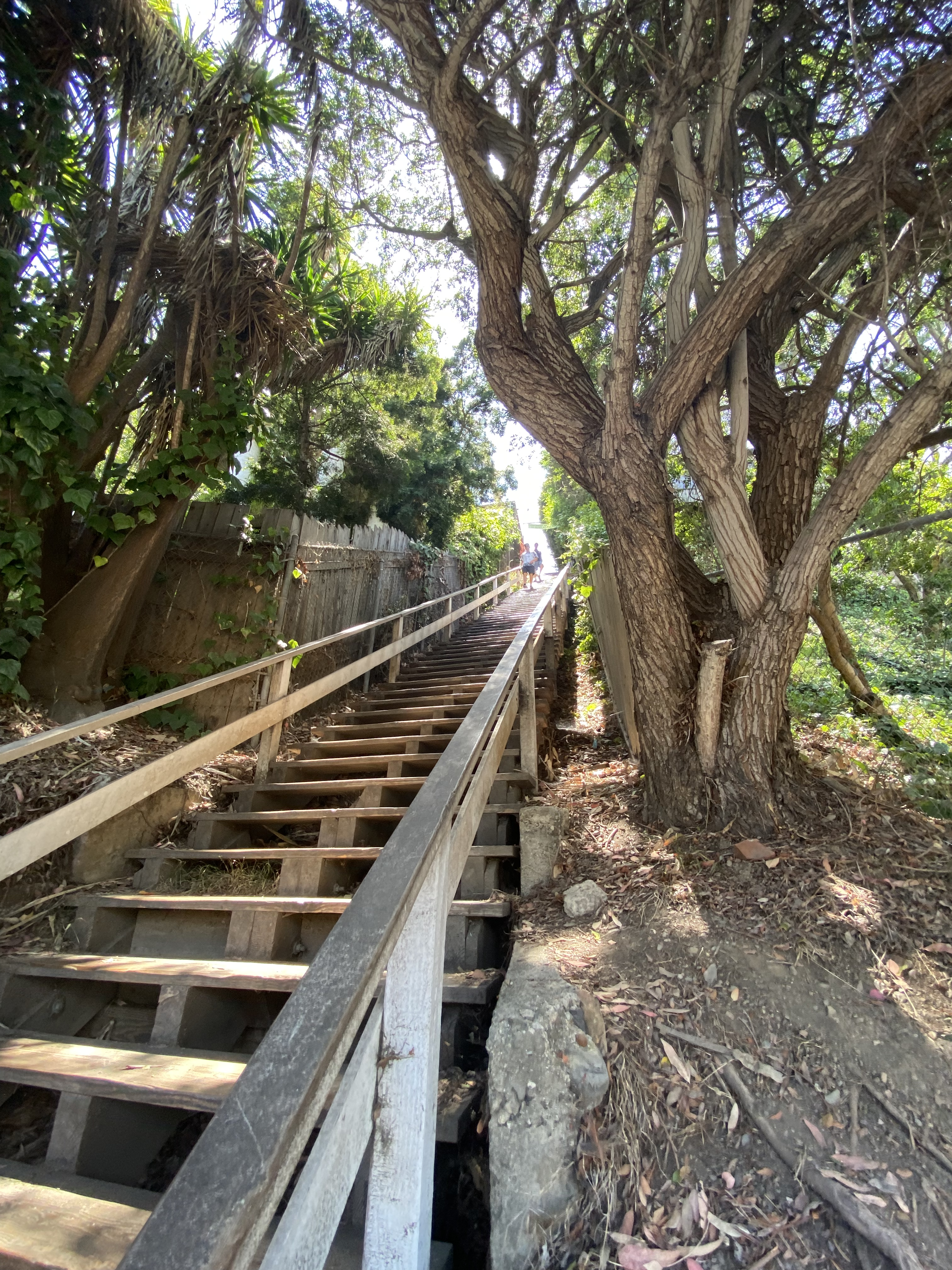
Bottom of the Santa Monica Stairs on Entrada

== Bluffs/beach stairs ==
Several other lengthy staircases nearby descend from Palisades Park bluffs to overpasses crossing Pacific Coast Highway to the beach:

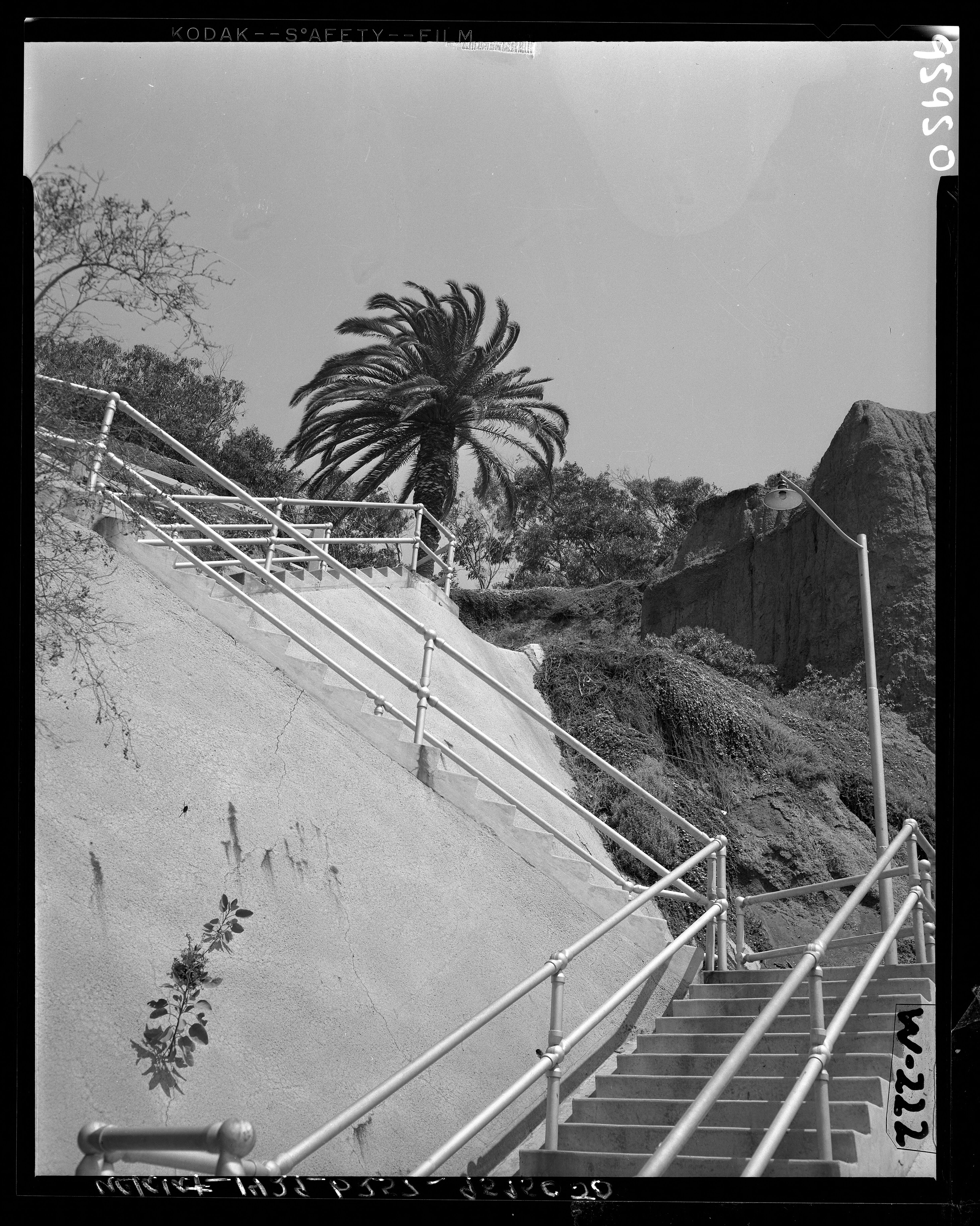
Santa Monica Stairs, view looking from beach up to street, Santa Monica, Calif. (Know Your City No. 232, Los Angeles Times, July 7, 1956)

- The northernmost crossing near Montana Avenue has 172 steps with a vertical change from Palisades Park to the pedestrian path on the beach of about 110 feet.
- Separate ramps, one from the vicinity of Idaho Ave and the other from the top of the California Incline, converge and share the same bridge crossing to the beach, with a vertical change of 105 feet from Idaho, 100 from California. The California route is bicycle-friendly with no steps at all, while the Idaho route has one circular stairway of 41 steps between long sections of ramp.
- One near Arizona Avenue has 115 steps with about 65 feet of vertical change, with the longer inland section made of attractive brick.
- One near Broadway has 83 steps with a vertical change of about 50 feet.

== Controversy ==
Some area residents have complained that the stairs have become too popular, and attract too many exercisers to the wealthy neighborhood of multi-million-dollar properties.

== See also ==
- Culver City Stairs
- Exorcist steps, another long, steep, urban staircase heavily used for exercise.
- Stair climbing
- Tower running
