= Keepie uppie =

Skill game and act of juggling a ball

Ball juggling, also known as keep-ups or kick-ups, is the skill of juggling with a football using feet, lower legs, knees, chest, shoulders, and head, without allowing the ball to hit the ground. It is similar to kemari, a game formerly practiced in the Japanese imperial court.

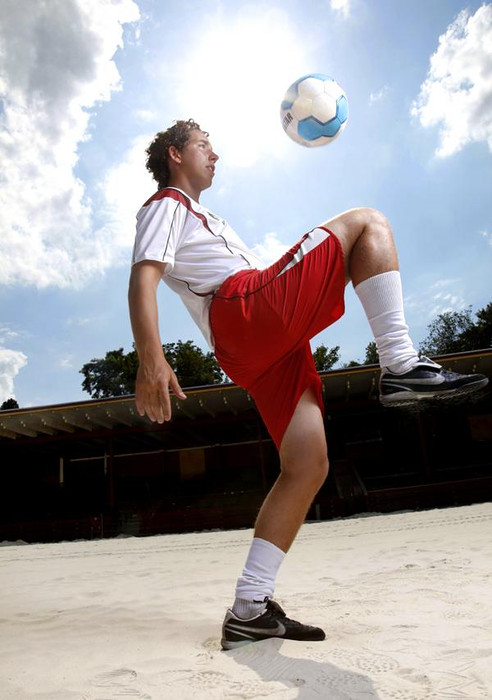
A footballer doing kick-ups

== World records ==
The record for the longest keepie uppie is 28 hours using just feet, legs, shoulders and head; Victor Ericsson completed the feat, which took place in Sweden, in June 2023. The previous men's record was held by Martinho Eduardo Orige of Brazil who kept a regulation football in the air for 19 hours and 30 minutes using only the head, feet and legs. The feat was accomplished on 2 and 3 August 2003.

The fastest completed marathon while ball-juggling was by Abraham Muñoz in the México City Marathon, August 2016. He completed the distance of 42.195 kilometres (26.219 mi) in 5 hours 41 minutes 52 seconds, without the ball ever touching the ground.

Dan Magness is the holder of the longest distance gone while doing keepie-uppie. He managed to go 30 miles (48 km) without letting the ball touch the ground. He achieved this feat on 26 January 2010 in London and in the process visited all the stadiums of the five Premier League teams in London. He started his journey at Fulham F.C.'s Craven Cottage and ended it at Tottenham Hotspur F.C.'s White Hart Lane.

Thomas Ruiz holds the world record for the longest distance covered in one hour while juggling a football ball. He achieved this distance on 30 August 2020, in Saline, Michigan, United States, when he travelled 7.20 kilometres (4.47 mi) while keeping the ball off the ground.

In 2020, Imogen Papworth-Heidel set herself the goal of achieving 7.1 million touches, one for every essential worker in the UK and performed 1,123,586 over 195 days to raise money for charities. The remaining 5,976,414 touches were "donated" by roughly 2,000 people sending in videos, including professional football players from Manchester United F.C.

The most touches of a football in 60 seconds, while keeping the ball in the air, is 274 by Isaac Wood of Australia, set on 25 October 2017 in Melbourne, Australia.

== In football games ==
One of the more famous displays of keepie-uppie was in the 1967 Scotland–England football match, where Scottish midfielder Jim Baxter juggled the ball for some time in front of the English defence, taunting them by keeping possession. This allowed Scotland to keep possession and use up the remaining few minutes, leading to a 3–2 victory for Scotland over the world champions. "That's a defining moment for almost every football fan in Scotland irrespective of where their club allegiance lies," said football historian Bob Crampsey.

== See also ==
- Ferdie Adoboe
- Freestyle football
- Hacky sack
