= Ferdie Adoboe =

Ghanaian record holder

Ferdie Ato Adoboe (born 1964) is a Ghanaian athlete who set a Guinness World Record in 1983 for running backwards. He is also a practitioner of speed juggling, the act of kicking a soccer ball in the air as many times as possible in a short period of time.

Adoboe lobbied Guinness World Records to establish a world record for speed juggling and in 1999, he set the first record at the Ft Lowell Shootout in Tucson, Arizona, by recording 136 touches in 30 seconds and 262 in one minute. He would later speed juggle a soccer ball 141 times in 30 seconds on The Today Show on Aug. 27, 2003.

Adoboe has held two speed-related world records, with a 100m time of 13.6 and a calculated 100 yards time of 12.7, both set on 25 July 1991.

Adoboe acts as a coach at his Soccer-Magic Skills Training Program & Academy, based in Amherst, Massachusetts. He has also served as a soccer and track and field coach at schools including Mt. Holyoke College, University of Massachusetts Amherst, and South Hadley High School (Massachusetts), and in the US Youth Soccer Olympic Development Program.

Players who have worked with Adoboe have gone on to play for US Regional and National teams, NCAA Division I College teams, Major League Soccer, European professional teams, and the UEFA Champions League. Notable alumni include: Robbie Russell, Jay Heaps, and Edson Buddle.

Adoboe was a Sports Illustrated Faces in the Crowd in 1983, and he is also an answer in the 1984 version of the popular trivia game Trivial Pursuit.

Adobe played for Australian club St George-Budapest SC during the 1989 National Soccer League season. He made three appearances.
