= Retro-walking =

Retro-walking refers to the act of walking with the face looking forward while the legs step backward.

== History ==
Retro-walking was recorded in China as early as the 5th century BC in the Kaogongji. Because retreating is seen as a sign of fear, the gesture carried a ritualistic meaning of respect and courteousness in ancient China.

Since the 19th century, there have been records across Europe and North America of retro-walking being undertaken as a long-distance challenge or the result of a wager. In the early 20th century, anecdotal reports also emerged of people completing long journeys by walking backwards, often as a display of endurance or an attempt to set a novel record.

== Physical exercise ==
Retro-walking uses a different gait pattern from normal walking, it can shift the workload to different muscle groups—often increasing activation in the calves and muscles that stabilize the hips and trunk. For safety, it should be practiced on a flat, obstacle-free surface, preferably at a slow pace at first.

== See also ==
- Backward running
- Plennie L. Wingo – American man who walked backwards from Santa Monica, California to Istanbul, Turkey
