= Vietnam Vertical Run =

Running race in Vietnam

Various vertical runs, or tower running races, have been conducted in Vietnam:

- 30 October 2011, Ho Chi Minh City: Bitexco Vertical Run; Thomas Dold won in the men's competition, Valentina Belotti won the women's competition.
- 30 September 2012, Hanoi: Hanoi Vertical Run at Landmark 72
- 15 September 2013, Hanoi: Hanoi Vertical Run at Landmark 72
- 18 April 2015, Hanoi: Hanoi Vertical Run at Landmark 72
- 9 July 2016, Hanoi: Hanoi Vertical Run at Landmark 72
- 29 October 2017, Ho Chi Minh City: HCMC Skyrun at Bitexco Financial Tower
- 28 October 2018, Ho Chi Minh City: HCMC Skyrun at Bitexco Financial Tower
- 27 October 2019, Ho Chi Minh City: HCMC Skyrun at Bitexco Financial Tower
- 30 October 2022, Ho Chi Minh City: HCMC Skyrun at Bitexco Financial Tower
- 29 October 2023, Ho Chi Minh City: HCMC Skyrun at Bitexco Financial Tower
- 08 September 2024, Ho Chi Minh City: Sedona SkyRun at Sedona Suites Ho Chi Minh City
- 10 August 2025, Ho Chi Minh City: Sedona SkyRun at Sedona Suites Ho Chi Minh City

== See also ==
- Sport in Vietnam
- Taipei 101 Run Up Marathon
- Sedona SkyRun
