= ChiRunning =

Form of running influenced by tai chi

ChiRunning is a form of running influenced by tai chi. It has been described as a "quasi-yoga-based style of running that is purported to reduce injury risk".

== Principles ==
ChiRunning has also been described as using "the principles of tai chi to focus on alignment, relaxation and proper form when running and walking". It is said to emphasize posture, core strength, relaxed legs, and "mindfulness".

In supporting the principles of the ChiRunning method, the company maintains a Medical Advisory Board that consists of a panel of healthcare professionals who agree with and approve of the ChiRunning and ChiWalking methods of movement.

== Scientific Evidence ==
A 2012 study, A Comparison of Lower Extremity Joint Work and Initial Loading Rates among Four Different Running Styles, was conducted over the course of one year with 74 runners who were separated into four groups based on distinct running styles: traditional shoe wearing rearfoot strikers, certified Chi runners, minimalist shoe wearing anterior foot strikers, and minimalist shoe wearing rearfoot strikers (MSR). The results of the study suggested that Chi running may be an alternative for runners with a history of overuse injuries of the lower extremities or for runners seeking to reduce lower extremity forces which may potentially cause injury.

== Technique ==
Dreyer has outlined the technique to ChiRunning as follows: "focus your mind", "sense your body", "breathe to tap into Chi", "relax your muscles", "practice good posture", and "start slow". Runners are instructed to have a straight back with a slight forward lean and bent knees. Propulsion is said to be gained through momentum attained through the lean, with a midfoot landing directly under the body.

== Development ==
ChiRunning was developed in 1999 by Danny Dreyer, an American ultramarathon runner, tai chi practitioner, and founder of the North Carolina–based company Chi Running. Instruction of the method is disseminated in several ways, including instructor led courses, books, and videos. A Forbes contributor claims that in 2004, Dreyer's first edition of his book, ChiRunning, was released and sold 150,000 copies however, there was no proper citation within his article to back up that claim.

== Workshops & Instructors ==
Creator and founder Danny Dreyer teaches the ChiRunning technique in a variety of workshops across the world. Additionally, ChiRunning certifies instructors worldwide who demonstrate the ability to accurately and professionally teach runners the ChiRunning technique. ChiRunning-certified instructors must meet a wide variety of criteria, and must renew their certification each calendar year, ensuring that these instructors provide quality instruction to runners.

== Bibliography ==
ChiRunning publishes a wide variety of resources, including Danny Dreyer's books:

- ChiRunning: A Revolutionary Approach to Effortless, Injury-free Running
- ChiWalking: Fitness Walking for Lifelong Health and Energy
- ChiMarathon
