= Eco-running =

Collecting litter while running recreationally

Eco-running is the variation of recreational running in which the participant collects the litter that is found along the path travelled. The founder of Eco-Running is Samuel Huber of Milwaukee, Wisconsin in the United States.
