= Montana Avenue =

Street on West Side of Greater Los Angeles

- Location: Los Angeles County
- West end: Ocean Avenue; 34.0222°N 118.5073°W
- Major junctions: Lincoln Boulevard; Bringham Avenue; --- Gap In Route --- From: 34.0568°N 118.4646°W To: 34.0655°N 118.4637°W; -------End Gap-------: Sepulveda Boulevard to I-405
- East end: Gayley and Veteran Avenues; 34.0703°N 118.4550°W

Montana Avenue is a primarily residential tree-lined street that stretches from Ocean Avenue in Santa Monica, California to the West L.A. Veterans Administration at Bringham Avenue in the Brentwood district of Los Angeles. A non-contiguous segment of Montana Avenue then continues east of the Veterans Administration in the Brentwood Glen neighborhood to Veteran Avenue at UCLA when it becomes Gayley Avenue. Gayley Avenue later becomes Midvale Avenue at its intersection with Wilshire Boulevard.

It is a well-known upscale shopping dining destination for both locals and visitors.

== Shopping and dining district ==
Montana Avenue is most famous for more than 150 upscale boutiques and restaurants in the portion from 7th to 17th Streets in Santa Monica. Many celebrities frequent the district. The district is home to popular restaurants, coffee shops.

== Public transportation ==
The western portion is served by Santa Monica Transit line 18, and the section by UCLA is served by LACMTA line 602.

== North of Montana ==
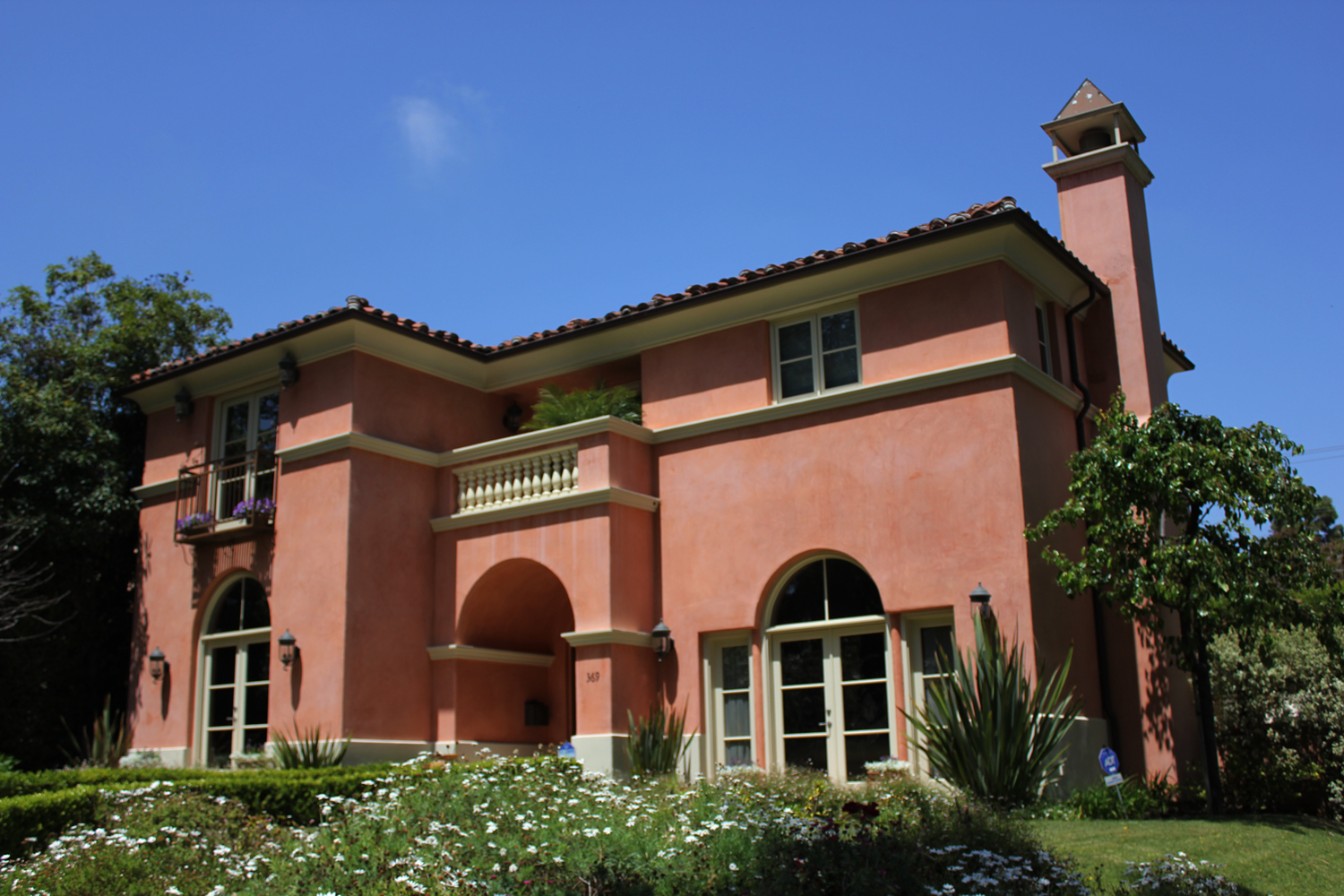
Spanish style Estate North of Montana

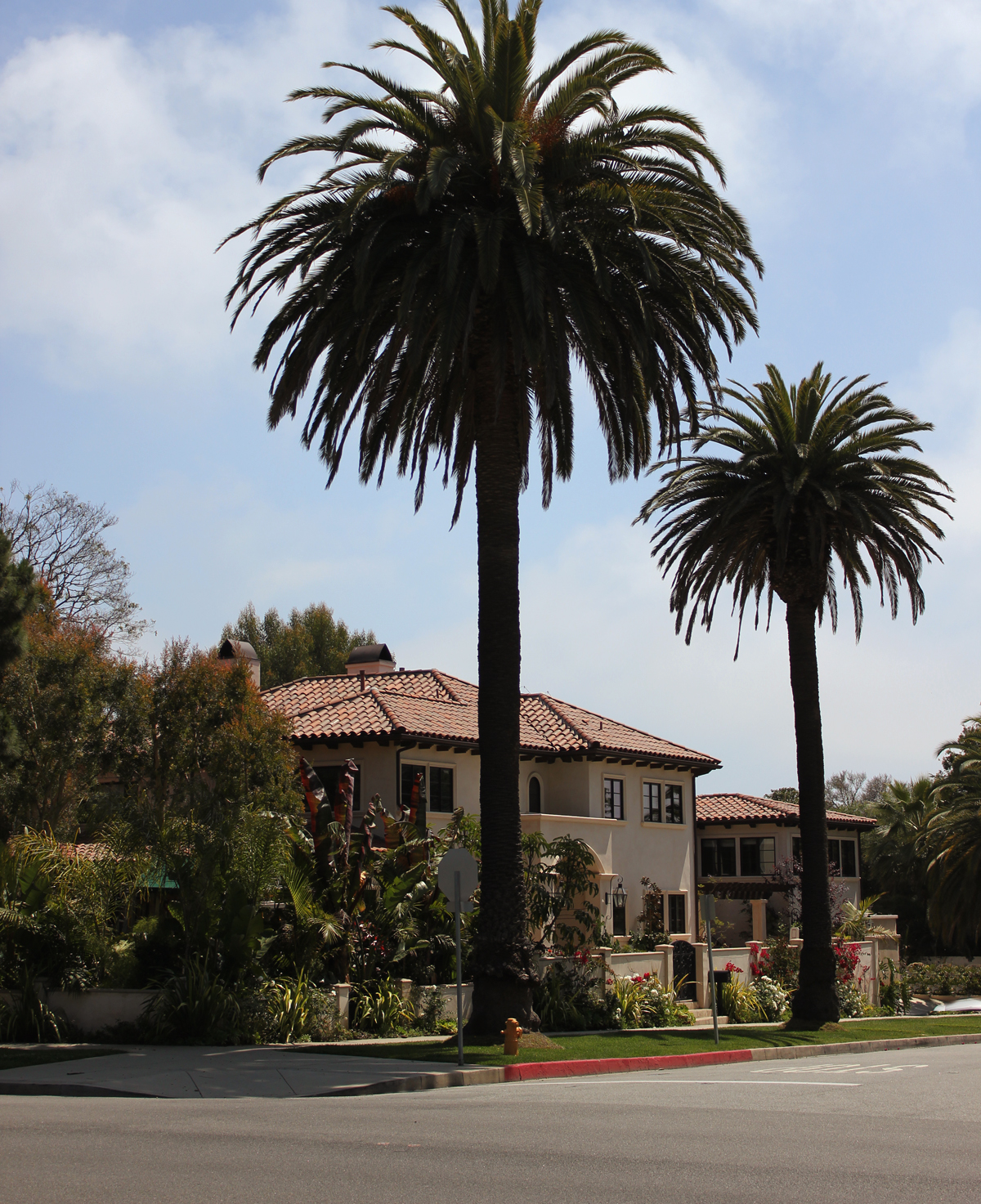
North of Montana Estate

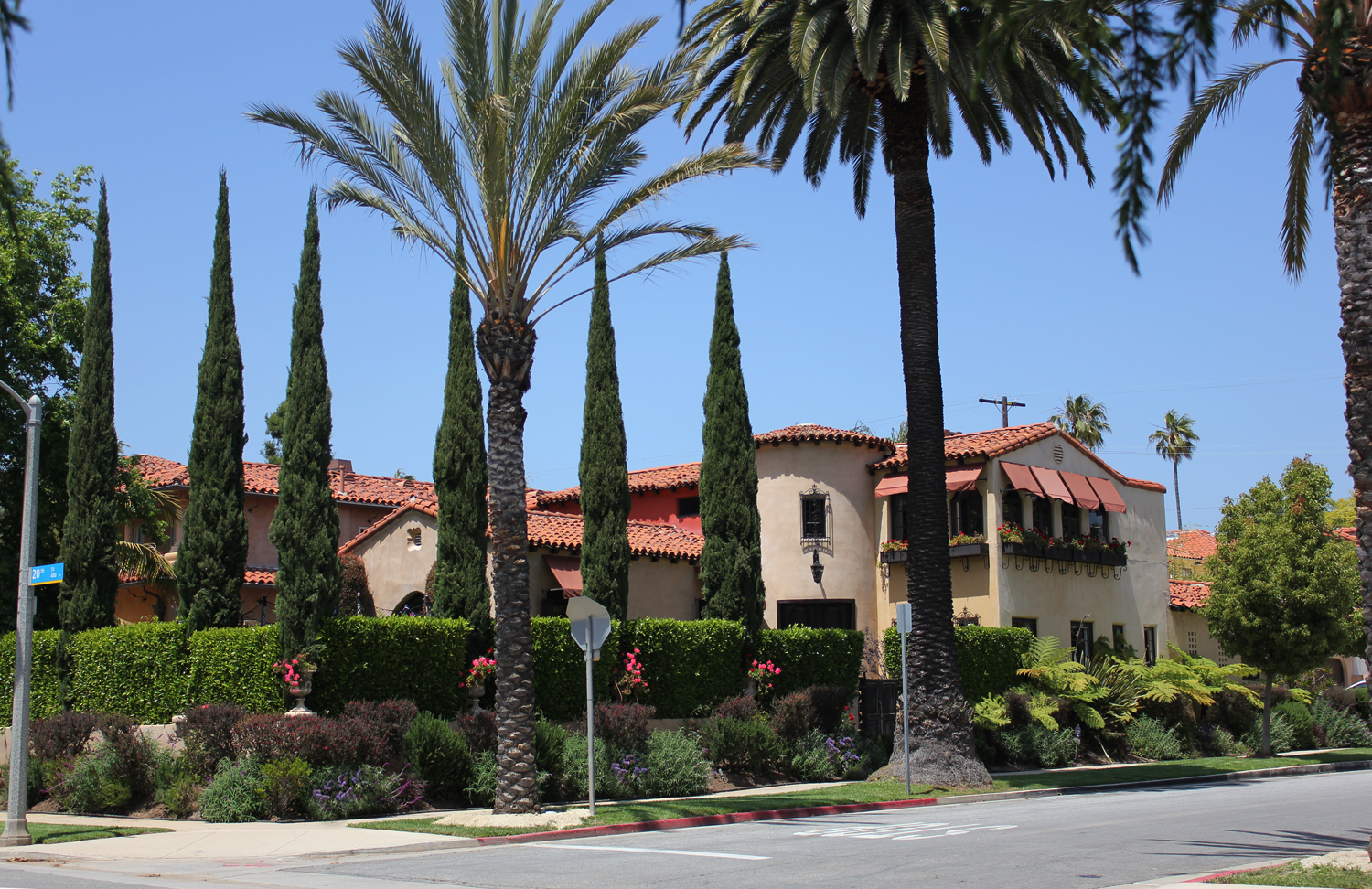
North of Montana Estate

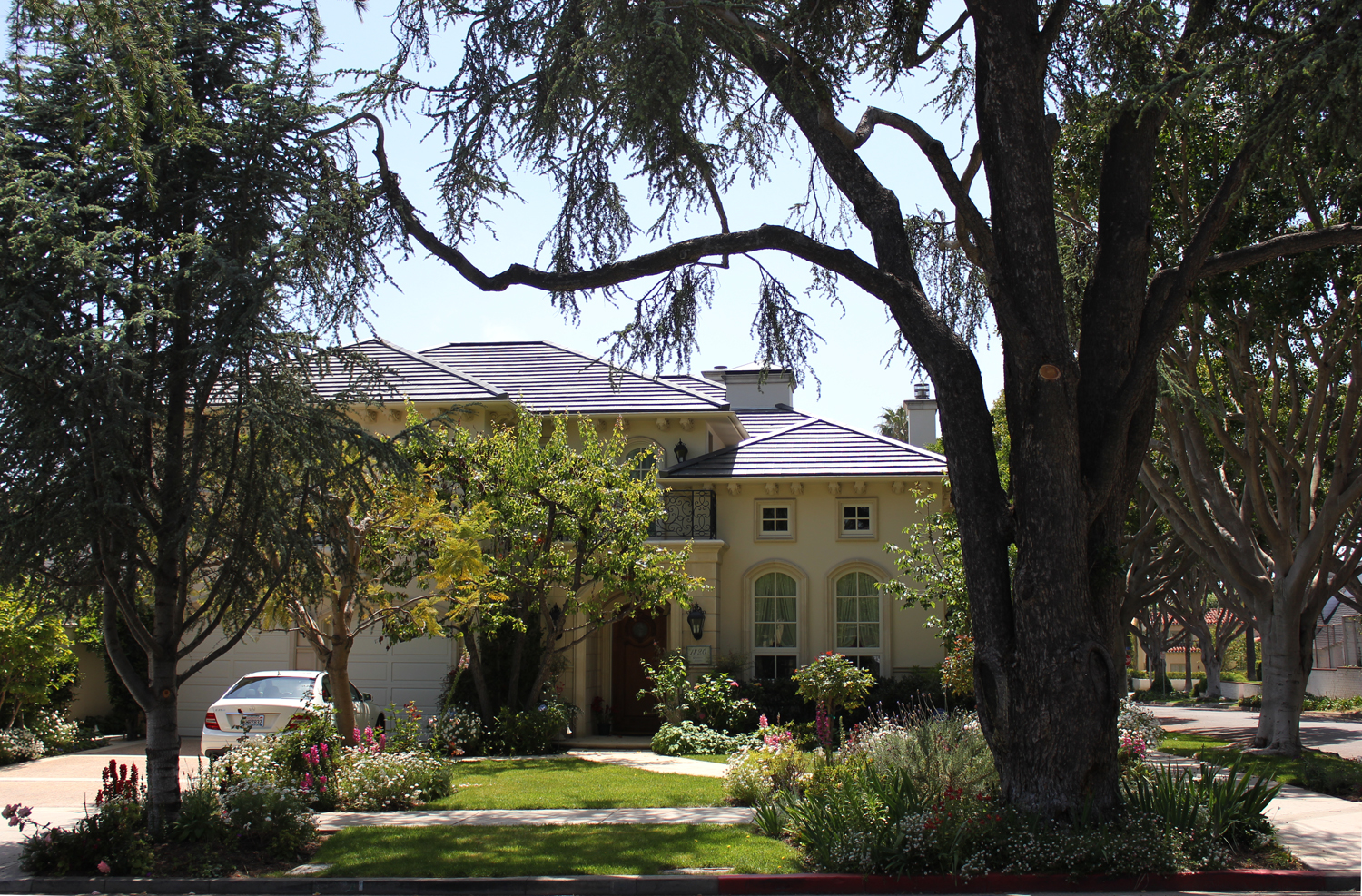
Home North of Montana

Two elementary schools, Roosevelt and Franklin are also on Montana.

Homes north of Montana in the 90402 (Santa Monica) ZIP code are considered to be among the most expensive in Los Angeles County, ranging from $2.5 million to $30 million. South of Montana are mainly businesses, condos and single family homes.
