= Level and incline running =

Terrestrial locomotion by means of a running gait can be accomplished on level surfaces. However, in most outdoor environments an individual will experience terrain undulations requiring uphill running. Similar conditions can be mimicked in a controlled environment on a treadmill also. Additionally, running on inclines is used by runners, both distance and sprinter, to improve cardiovascular conditioning and lower limb strength.

== Gait ==
One complete gait cycle is defined as beginning when one foot comes into contact with the ground and continuing until that same foot contacts the ground again. The gait cycle can be further broken down into a number of component parts. Running, by definition, involves a maximum of one foot in contact with the ground at any given time and often no contact with the ground. When the foot is in contact with the ground it is referred to as the “stance phase”. The “aerial phase” is the period between contralateral foot contacts when the body is airborne. For one specific leg, the time of toe-off until subsequent heel contact is known as the “swing-phase” for that leg. One complete gait cycle involves a stance and swing phase for each leg.

Running is characterized as a “bouncing gait” rather than the inverted pendulum mechanism of walking. The stance phase of running can be sub-divided into two parts; during the first half energy is used to perform the negative work of both slowing and lowering the center of mass. In the second half of the stance phase energy is used to perform positive work to lift and accelerate the body. Because of the synchrony of the fluctuations of kinetic energy and gravitational potential energy experienced by the center of mass, mechanical work during running is performed by optimizing the combination of conserved elastic energy in tendons from lengthening and muscle contraction.

== Kinematics ==
Kinematics of running is concerned with describing the motion of the body and in particular the joint angles realized at the hip, knee, and ankle. In level running the hip reaches maximal flexion prior to the end of the swing phase, followed by extension as the leg moves to meet the ground. Throughout stance phase the hip is extending until toe-off to provide propulsion. Knee joint angle displays a biphasic plot. At initial ground contact the knee flexes to lower the body followed by extending to propel the body. Maximal extension is reached at toe-off, after which the knee again flexes to provide clearance. At the ankle maximal plantarflexion is reached at toe-off and is followed by dorsiflexion until mid-swing when the ankle of dorsiflexion remains nearly constant until initial ground contact is made and further dorsiflexion occurs to lower and support the body. In the second half of the stance phase the ankle begin rapid plantar flexion until toe-off.

A number of studies have been performed examining the kinematics of incline running. Swanson and Caldwell (2000) found greater joint flexion at all three joints during initial foot-strike. Also noted was an increase in extensor range of motion and angular velocity at all three joints during push off. Conversely, Klein et al. had found no changes in joint angles when running on an incline versus level surfaces. However, his subjects ran at a speed equal to anaerobic threshold (average of 3.5 meters/second) that was significantly slower than the subjects in Swanson and Caldwell’s study (4.5 meters/second). Also, grade was 5% in contrast to 30%.

=== Stride Frequency and Length ===
When running at a constant speed, it has been found that stride frequency increases during incline vs. level running with a concomitant decrease in stride length. At a speed of 3 meters/second Gottschall and Kram noted an increase in stride frequency from 1.45±0.06 Hz to 1.51±0.07 Hz at an incline of 9 degrees (15.8%). Telhan et al. validated this finding at a constant speed of 3.13 meters/second and a gradient of 4 degrees (6.98%) when they observed an increase in frequency from 168.5±8.1 steps/minute to 170.5±7.9 steps/minute. Both studies also saw significant decreases in stride length when running on an incline as compared to level running. The previous studies occurred at moderate speeds. When running velocity is increased 4.5 meters/second and grade increased to 30%, the same trends of increasing stride frequency and decreasing stride length are seen.

=== Muscle Activation ===
The quadriceps femoris muscle group and rectus femoris are both responsible for knee extension while the rectus femoris also contributes to flexion at the hip. Electromyographic (EMG) data has shown both to be active in anticipation of and during stance phase to support the body. The rectus femoris is also active in mid-swing phase as a result of its hip flexor capabilities. The major antagonist muscles to the quad set are the gluteal muscles (hip extension) and the hamstrings (hip extension and knee flexion). The hamstring muscles activate in mid-swing phase to help decelerate the lower leg. Both groups are active in late swing phase to begin to extend the hip as well as being active in the first half of the stance phase to perform the same action. Lower leg muscles acting on the ankle are the dorsiflexors (tibialis anterior) and plantarflexors (gastrocnemius and soleus). The gastrocnemius and solius are active in the last part of swing phase to prepare for foot strike and remain active through stance until just before toe-off in order to propel the body forward. The tibialis anterior is active during swing to allow ground clearance and undergoes eccentric lengthening during stance to help control deceleration and lowering.

During incline running increases in activation of the rectus femoris and gastrocnemius were noted by Cai. Yokozawa found incline running to produce increased activation in the vasti group, hamstrings, iliopsoas, and adductors. Neither of these two provided timing on what point of gait these increases occurred. Swanson also recorded EMG data, but compared differences before foot strike (swing phase) and after foot strike (stance phase) as well as on a wider range of muscles. Results showed significant increases in activation of tibialis anterior, gastrocnemius, soleus, rectus femoris, vastus lateralis, medial hamstring, biceps femoris, and gluteus maximus before foot strike. Following foot strike increases were seen in all muscles with the exception of the tibialis anterior and medial hamstring.

== Kinetics ==
The kinetics of running, similar to the kinematics, is used to describe the motion of the body. However, in contrast to kinematics, kinetics also takes into account the relationship between motion and the forces and torques the causing it. These are expressed as joint moments and torques. Telhan et al. observed no change in the joint moments at the hip, knee, or ankle when comparing incline to level running. Also noted was that both general kinetic patterns and peak magnitudes at all three joints were consistent with those in the current literature. The only significant change between the two conditions was an increase in the hip power at early stance phase. In contrast, Yokozawa saw increases in support phase knee and hip torques at the rectus femoris, hypothesizing it as a compensation mechanism for the decreased knee extension torque at the vasti set. Also seen was an increase in the net hip flexion torque during the recovery phase of incline running, allowing a quicker recovery and allowing a greater amount of hip flexion.

=== Ground Reaction Forces ===
Ground reaction forces (GRF) are exerted by the ground on the body in contact with it and reflect the body’s acceleration. During level running, ground reaction forces can be dichotomized into vertical ground reaction forces and horizontal ground reaction forces. In the comparison of incline to level running, the terms normal and parallel ground reaction forces are substituted for vertical and horizontal because when running on an incline the latter terms become inaccurate in describing the direction of force application. Measurements are expressed as a percentage of body weight, where a value of one body weight is the force exerted to support the body when standing. A plot of normal GRF is characterized by its biphasic nature, with an initial impact peak corresponding to the braking portion of the stance phase (heal strike) followed by a larger peak representing the propulsion part of the stance phase (toe off). Typical parallel GRF application during running involves two peaks, one that is negative during breaking and one that is positive during propulsion. Important characteristics of a GRF plot are the magnitude of the peaks (impact and active), the rate of loading, average force, and the total area under the plot.

During level running at a speed of 3meters per second the vertical ground reaction force reaches a peak of approximately 2.5 times body weight. Data on normal GRF during incline running has been sparse because of challenges in force platform construction. Gottschall and Kram (2004) mounted a force treadmill on wedges of varying inclines and found that compared to level running, the initial impact peak was decreased at 3, 6, and 9 degrees of inline. They also found that the braking parallel GRF was absent at 9 degrees of incline in addition to a 75% increase in the propulsive parallel GRF. Tehlan, however, did not find a blunted impact peak with incline running at 4 degrees.
