= Backward running =

Act of running in reverse

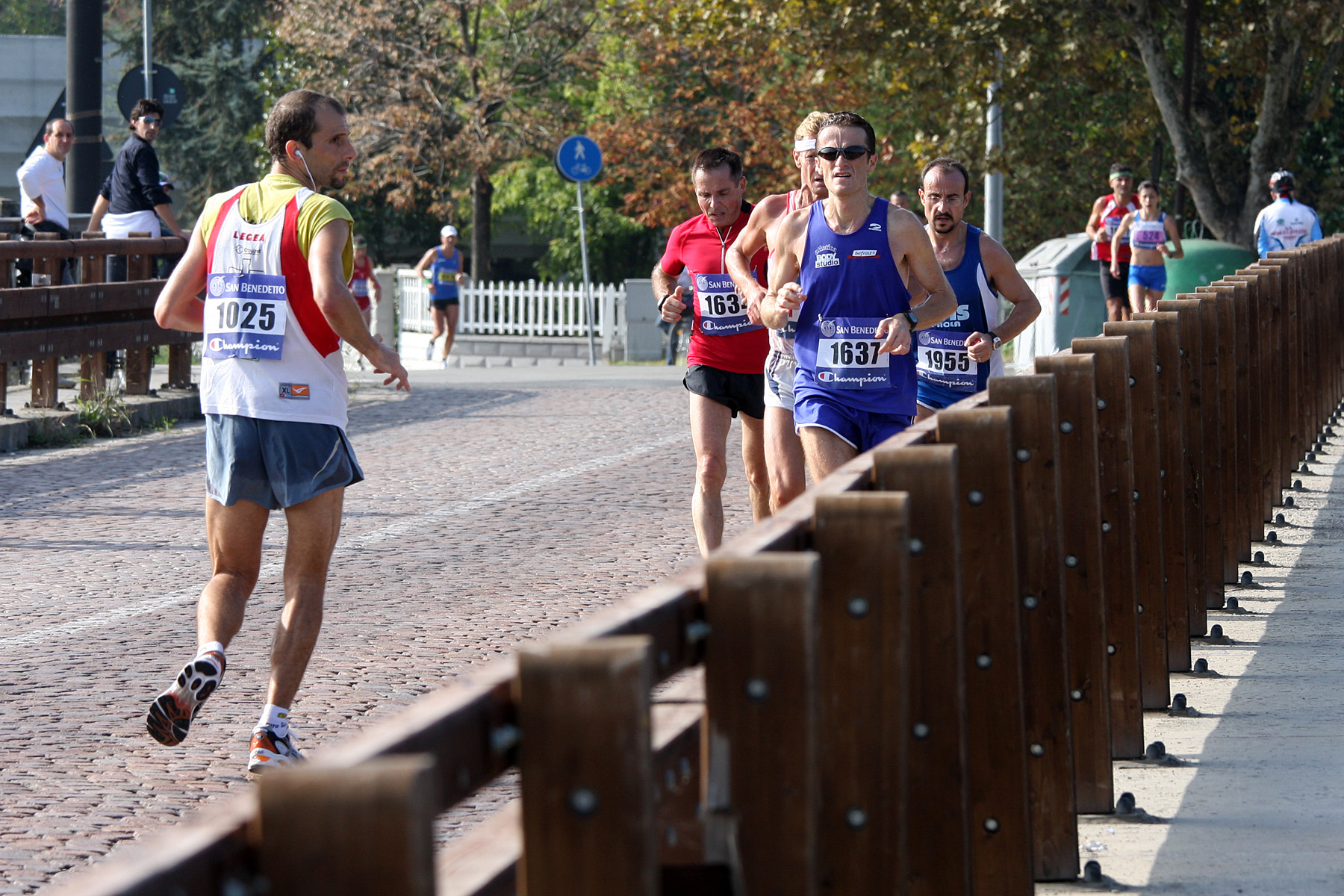
A marathon participant running backwards

Backward running, also known as backwards running, running backwards, reverse running, retro running, or retro locomotion is the act of running in reverse, so that one travels in the direction one's back is facing rather than one's front. It is classed as a retro movement, the reverse of a normal movement.

The fastest time recorded for a marathon running backwards is Irish athlete - Conor J. Fitzgerald at a time of 3 hours and 41 minutes and 52 seconds at the 2024 Sydney Marathon.

Backward running is a less natural motion but can be accomplished with some speed with practice. It is better to start out backward walking (also called retropedaling), which is relatively easy, and increase speed over time. World records indicate that backward running is about 35% slower than ordinary running (5 minutes and 36 seconds versus 3 minutes and 43 seconds for one mile). Like normal running, running up and down hills backwards will add an additional degree of difficulty.

Running backwards up a hill is not very dangerous. It will always be at a lower speed due to the enhanced difficulty, and if one trips there is less of a distance towards the ground and it is easier to absorb the impact with the arms and buttocks so that the head is not as likely to hit.

Running backwards down a hill is more dangerous, and it is advised that someone learn how to drop into a backward roll before attempting it, to deal with any resulting tripping or loss of balance in the prone movement. Although the distance to the ground is greater running downhill backwards, the incline makes it much easier to perform rolls in downhill running, than when running level ground, so it can be done more instinctively. This applies to backward running and the backroll as it does to front running and the front roll.

Another modality is walking backwards as an exercise, sometimes known as retro-walking. It is practised as gait training after lesions. Scientific literature is not certain if the benefits observed are due to the direction of the movement or the higher intensity and concentration. It also increases the risk for geriatric patients. In spite of this, it has become a social trend.

== Biomechanics ==
Backward motion is less energy efficient, but backward running can reduce knee pain, and more freedom of movement is possible with backward running due to less coordination. Training this way can also increase metabolic efficiency with forward running.

== Dangers ==
As the head faces forward, running backwards has the danger in that the runner cannot see anything on the ground or in the way of his or her path. Unlike forward running, it is also much more difficult to brace a backward fall or drop into a roll if one trips.

Turning the head around while running can generally eliminate the visual impediment, although it is awkward, limits speed, and may result in neck strain.

Practicing tumbling and exerting force in a backwards direction with the arms through various exercises like crabwalking or planches may aid in stopping damage or injury from falls or stopping falls.

== Physical benefits ==
The combination of normal forward running and backward running is called mixed running or alternative mixed running. Some believe that running backwards helps balance out the strain brought on by normal running. Reversing the direction works the friction of tissues oppositely. Running flat or uphill, the heel is used to push off rather than the ball of the foot as normally occurs with forward running, working the tibialis anterior muscle (pushes the heel down, raises the front of the foot) more as a prime mover than a shock absorber. When running backward downhill, the ball of the foot is used whereas forward downhill running uses mainly the heel to absorb the force. This requires more coordination and therefore develops brain power along with muscle power.

While downhill backward running is essentially the reverse of uphill running, and uphill backward running of downhill running, they are different in that the fibres would fire differently due to differences in the isotonic motions. The former is an eccentric version of a concentric movement, and the latter is a concentric version of an eccentric movement. Both concentric and eccentric movements have advantages in training, which is why most weight lifters perform both for set times.

With all forms there is an obvious backward lean relative to normal running's forward lean, which can shift the stress of the other muscle fibres a small degree.

Other advantages to backward running are a reduction in fear related to the movement, a form of exercise that is naturally more reserved, gains in balance, and the general enjoyment resulting from entertaining activities like these. Due to constantly having to look behind oneself, or sometimes keeping the eyes fixed, people can learn to run with more neck mobility or without a straight look ahead. This can stress the neck muscles which can be dangerous if done too aggressively, but in the long term could lead to adaptations in them.

Backward running adds another dimension to running, and when complemented by sidestepping in both directions (with and without crossovers front and behind intermittently) covers the essential dimensions of human movement on the two-dimensional plane. Diagonal movement as well as curving running (as is done on long race tracks like 200 m and longer in the Olympics) are additional forms of running.

Backwards running allows referees in sports such as football or rugby to continuously observe an area of play without interfering with play.

== World Championships ==
Competition	Date	Location	Distances
1. IRR World Championships	10 June 2006	Rotkreuz (Switzerland)	100 meters, 400 meters, 3000 meters und 4 × 100 meters
2. IRR World Championships	20/21 September 2008	Pietrasanta (Italy)	100 meters, 200 meters, 400 meters, 800 meters, 1500 meters, 3000 meters, 5000 meters, 10,000 meters, 4 × 400 meters, 4 × 100 meters
3. IRR World Championships	7/8 July 2010	Kapfenberg (Austria)	100 meters, 200 meters, 400 meters, 800 meters, 1500 meters, 3000 meters, 5000 meters, 10,000 meters, 4 × 400 meters, 4 × 100 meters
4. IRR World Championships	24/25 August 2012	Lleida (Spain)	100 meters, 200 meters, 400 meters, 800 meters, 1500 meters, 3000 meters, 5000 meters, 10,000 meters, 4 × 100 meters, 4 × 400 meters
5. IRR World Championships	1–3 August 2014	Saint Christophe, Saint Vincent, Châtillon (Italy)	100 meters, 200 meters, 400 meters, 800 meters, 1500 meters, 3000 meters, 5000 meters, 10,000 meters, half marathon, 4 × 100 meters, 4 × 400 meters
6. IRR World Championships	14–17 July 2016	Essen (Germany)	100 meters, 200 meters, 400 meters, 800 meters, 1500 meters, 3000 meters, 5000 meters, 10,000 meters, half marathon, 4 × 100 meters, 4 × 400 meters
7. IRR World Championships	12–15 July 2018	Bologna (Italy)	100 meters, 200 meters, 400 meters, 800 meters, 1500 meters, 3000 meters, 5000 meters, 10,000 meters, half marathon, marathon, 4 × 100 meters, 4 × 400 meters

== Notable backward runners ==
- Sandra Corcuera (ESP)
- Diego Polino (MXN)
- Ferdie Adoboe (GHA)
- Thomas Dold (GER)
- Surasa Mairer (AUT)
- Michelle Neal (UK)

== Popular culture ==
In 2012, an Australian comedy film called Reverse Runner was released. It was executive produced by Stephen Herek, the director of The Mighty Ducks, and directed by Lachlan Ryan and Jarrod Theodore.

In 2013, the band Atoms For Peace released the song Reverse Running, as part of their debut album Amok.

== See also ==
- Retro-walking
- Level and incline running
