= Stair climbing =

Activity of ascending or descending stairs

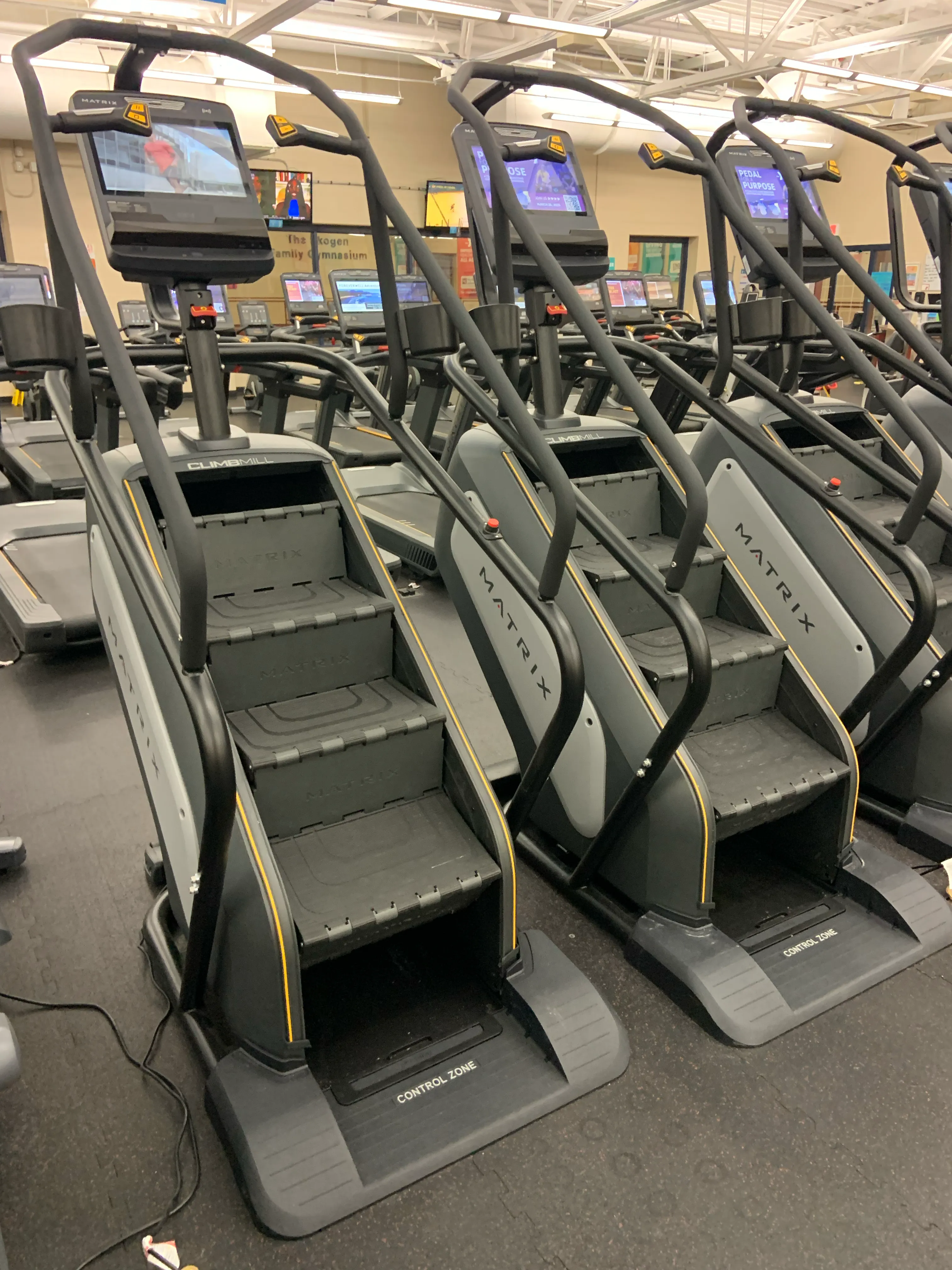
Stair machines for exercise

Stair climbing is the climbing of a flight of stairs. It is often described as a "low-impact" exercise, often for people who have recently started trying to get in shape. A common exhortation in health pop culture is "Take the stairs, not the elevator".

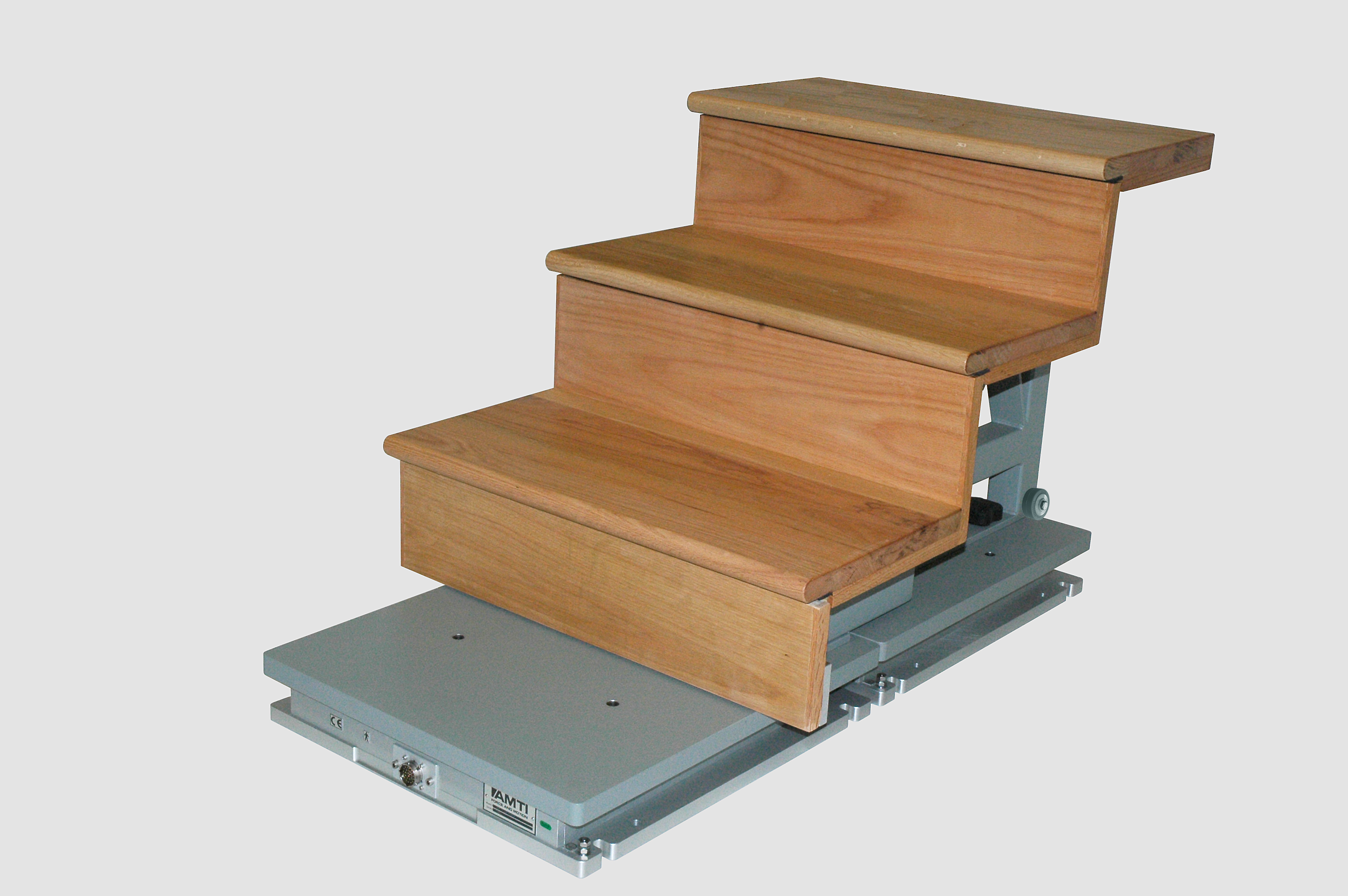
The Force Plate-Mounted Stairs by AMTI are primarily used for research into gait disorders when a subject is walking up and down a set of stairs. Stair ambulation is an essential component of mobility in individuals, making its study critical to determining appropriate clinical intervention.

== Energy expenditure ==
In one study based on mean oxygen uptake and heart rate, researchers estimated that ascending a 15 cm (5.9 inches) step expends 0.46 kJ (0.11 kcal) for the average person, and descending a step expends 0.21 kJ (0.05 kcal). The study concluded that stair-climbing met the minimum requirements for cardiorespiratory benefits, and considered stair-climbing suitable for promotion of physical activity.

== Competitive sport ==
Stair climbing has developed into the organized sport tower running. Every year several stair climbing races are held around the world with the competitors running up the stairs of some of the world's tallest buildings and towers (e.g., the Empire State Building, Gran Hotel Bali), or on outside stairs such as the Niesenbahn Stairway. World class athletes from the running and cycling worlds regularly compete in such events. Some have specialized exclusively in stair climbing races. Prizes, awards, and other accolades are given for the top performers by gender and age group. Stair climbing is one of the most grueling of sports, requiring competitors to move their entire body weight vertically, as well as horizontally. The results of more than 160 races on all continents are evaluated each year for the Towerrunning World Cup. The most important - about 18 so called "Masters Races" - have a predefined factor of 1.5 to 2.5, whereas all other races are given 0.4, 0.7 or 1 depending on class and internationality of the participants. 2010 World Cup winners were Melissa Moon (NZL) and Thomas Dold (GER). 2011 winners are Dold (3rd time) and Cristina Bonacina (ITA). The World Cup Final 2012 was hosted on December 8 in Bogota (COL).

An annual competition, 'Girnar Arohan Spardha', is held in Junagadh, India, and involves a race to climb and descend the steps of the Girnar mountain.

ESPN8 The Ocho has a televised event called "Slippery Stairs".

== Infants and safe stair descent ==
Falling down a flight of stairs or just a couple of steps is very common during infants’ first exposure to stair descent. Infants are more likely to fall down stairs than any other age group. In the United States, approximately 73,000 children between the ages of 6 months and 2 years have reported injury on stairs or steps in 2009.

Stair descent involves perceptual, cognitive and motor abilities. It relies heavily on visual information to enable balance and accuracy. Seeing obstacles ahead helps stair descent, but for infants the action of keeping their heavy head balanced enough to look down at their feet and the objective together, make the process very difficult. (Hurlke, 1998). Not seeing the task ahead causes confusion and disrupts concentration.

Infants tend to adopt one of several strategies closely associated with stair descent:

- Scooting: where the infant sits on the step and thrusts forward using their bottom to land on the next step.
- Backing: where the infant turns around (to counter the motion of climbing), and slowly lowers one foot at a time to descend to the lower step. Backing distributes the weight evenly on all four limbs, but means that the child cannot see what it is doing.
- Walking: where a child descends in an upright position facing the bottom of the staircase, lowering one foot at a time to the next step.

Some limited norms for stair climbing motor milestones have been established, but the process had historically been viewed like any other motor milestone - as a universal skill acquired through development.

One study looked at the typical age onset for stair ascent and descent, and compared them to other developmental milestones. It also looked at the stair climbing strategies that infants use. Consisting of 732 infants, and including parental assessment and documentation of motor skill achievements, along with in-depth interviews parents about the strategies involved and child assessment using laboratory stair apparatus. The results showed that children younger than 9 months of age were unable to go up or down stairs at all, or were only able to go up. By around 13 months, most infants could go upstairs and about half could ascend and descend stairs. Infants typically learned to descend stairs after they have already learned to ascend, with only about 12% achieved both stair-climbing skills at the same time.

On average in this study, infants learned to crawl and cruise before learning to ascend stairs independently. Infants were able to climb up the stairs before they could walk, but walking tended to come before independent stair descent. While most of the infants had prior stair experience, the presence or absence of stairs in the home did not influence the onsets of crawling, cruising or stair descent. However, lack of exposure to stairs resulted in a significant time-lag between first learning to ascend and to descend. Differences in housing types created a so-called 'suburban advantage' (i.e. houses with stairs versus flats/apartments without).

Sliding backwards feet first is the safest approach to descending stairs due to the fact that the midline of the body is closer to the staircase providing an even weight distribution on all four limbs. This might explain why it is exceptionally difficult for older people to descend stairs, because their midline is so far way due to longer arms and legs.

Other research suggests that infants’ descent strategies may be related to their cognitive abilities. This is why most parents teach their children to back down stairs, even though it's the safest it is also the most cognitively difficult descent strategy.

== Records ==
- On 28 September 2014, Christian Riedl climbed Tower 185 in Frankfurt, Germany 71 times in 12 hours for a total of 43,128 ft (13.14 km).
- From 5–6 October 2007, Kurt Hess climbed Esterli Tower in Switzerland 413 times in less than 24 hours for a total of 60,974 ft (18.585 km).
