= Tower running =

Sport, usually taking place on staircases

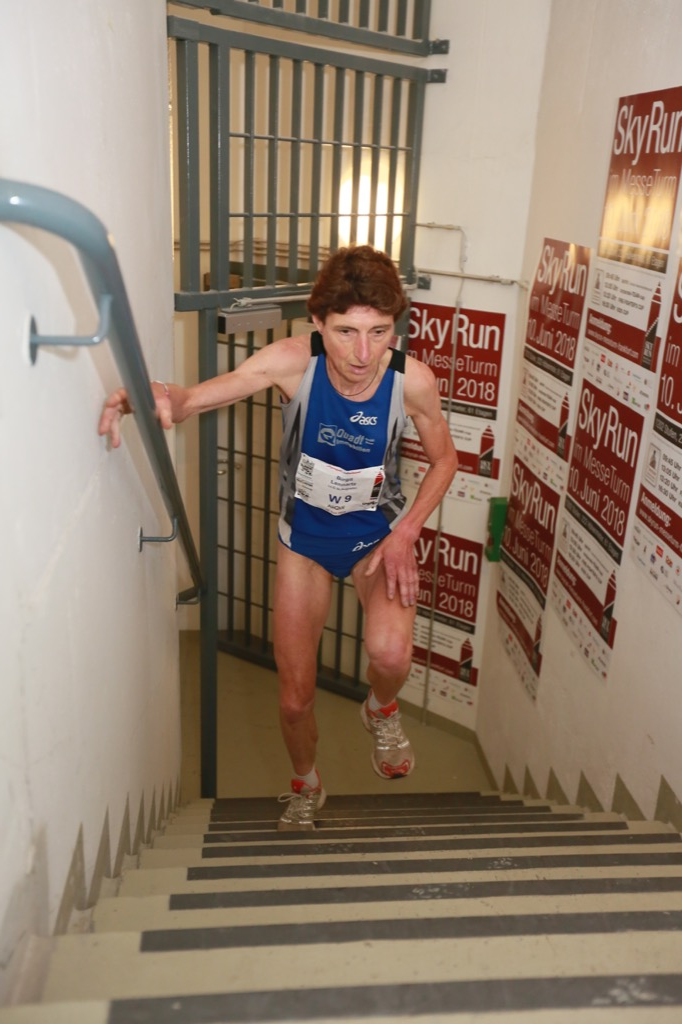

Tower running is a sport which involves running up tall man-made structures. Usually the races take place on the internal staircases of skyscrapers, but the term can cover any foot race which involves a course that ascends a man-made structure.

Tower running races often take place at the world's tallest structures, including Taipei 101 (Taipei), KL Tower (Kuala Lumpur), Willis Tower (Chicago), CN Tower (Toronto), Eiffel Tower (Paris), Varso Tower (Warsaw), Tower 42 (London), Eureka Tower (Melbourne), Swissôtel (Singapore), the Empire State Building (New York), the Bitexco Financial Tower (Ho Chi Minh City), and the Torre Colpatria (Bogotá). Races are held in either time trial or mass-start format and attract elite athletes from various sports, often with large sums of prize money.

The results of more than 160 races on all continents are evaluated each year for the Towerrunning World Cup. The most important – about 15 so called "Masters Races" – have a predefined factor of 1.5 to 4, whereas all other races are given 0.5 or 1 depending on the class and internationality of the participants.

== History ==
One of the first known reports of stair running took place in London, England in 1730. A barman at the Baptist Head Tavern on the Old Bailey took part in a challenge to see if he could run up the 311 steps of the Monument to the Great Fire of London and back down again in three minutes or less. He managed to complete the challenge in 2:32, which was deemed ‘an extraordinary performance’.

The first recorded competitive stair race was held on Bastille Day (14 July) 1903 in Paris. Organised by a publication called Revue Sportive, the event took place on the steps of the famous Rue Foyatier in the 18th arrondissement of the city.

In 1905 the first known tower race was held at the Eiffel Tower. It took place on Sunday 26 November and was organised by a publication called Les Sports. The magazine's aim was to pit champions and elite athletes from various sporting traditions against each other in the ultimate test of fitness. Runners, cyclists, footballers plus amateurs were all among the 283 people who took part in the first ever tower race.

The event was repeated again in 1906, and the course record was broken. Further events followed at the Eiffel Tower in 1946 and 1995. After a 20-year break, tower running returned to the Eiffel Tower in 2015 with the inaugural La Verticale de la Tour Eiffel event. That race has now become one of the premier events on the tower running circuit.

In 1968, the sport made its debut in the United Kingdom. Teams from the University of London and the University of Edinburgh went head-to-head at the BT Tower in London, with the Edinburgh team taking victory. That inter-university event was repeated in 1969 and 1970, after which there were years of inactivity for the sport in the UK.

Tower running made its debut in the United States in 1978, when Fred Lebow organised the first Empire State Building Run Up (ESBRU). The ESBRU event has run every year since, except for being canceled in 2020 due to COVID-19, and is the longest continuously running stair racing event in the world.

Several more races popped up in the US, and at other venues around the world, such as Singapore, throughout the 1980s, and the sport has been slowly growing since.

2015 saw the inaugural World Championship in Doha, Qatar, with Andrea Mayr (AUT) and Piotr Łobodziński (POL) crowned champions. The 2018 World Championship was held on 5 May at Taipei 101 in Taiwan. Piotr Łobodziński (POL) retained his title, while Suzy Walsham (AUS) won the women's title. The planned 2020 World Towerrunning Championship event at Taipei 101 was cancelled due to the COVID-19 pandemic.

== See also ==
- Taipei 101 Run Up (zh:台北101垂直馬拉松)
- Vietnam Vertical Run
