= C. P. Wang =

Taiwanese architect

Wang Chung-ping
- Born: 1947 (age 78–79); Peking
- Education: Tunghai University (BS); Washington University in St. Louis (MArch)
- Occupation: Architect
- Buildings: Taipei 101

C. P. Wang (Wang Chung-ping) (born 1947 in Beijing, China) is a Taiwanese architect. He received his bachelor's degree from Tunghai University in 1971 and his Master of Architecture from the School of Architecture at Washington University in St. Louis in 1973. He is co-principal of the architectural firm C.Y. Lee & Partners, located in Taipei, Taiwan. C.P. Wang was one of the prominent designers of Taipei 101, which was the world's tallest skyscraper from 2004 to 2010.

== List of major designs ==
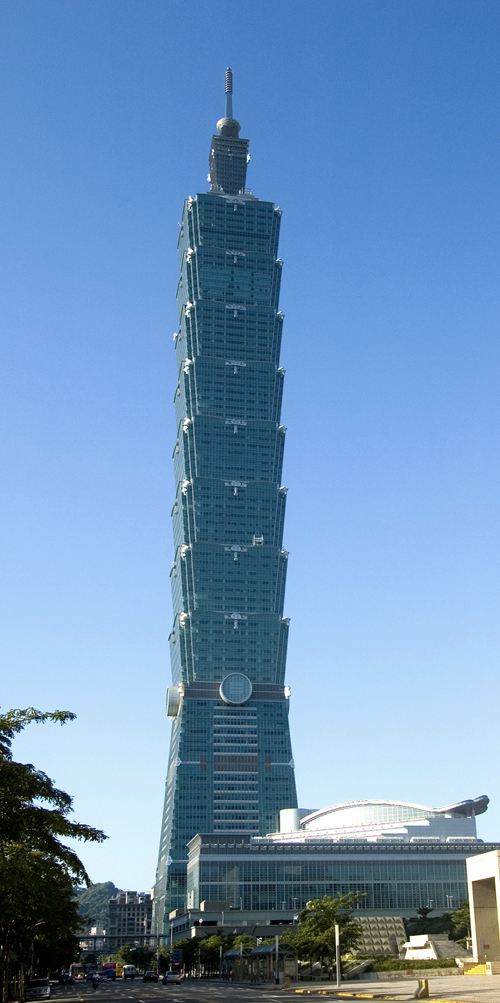
Taipei 101 was the most famous design by C.P. Wang and C. Y. Lee.

- Taiwan
  - Hung Kuo Building, Taipei, 1989.
  - Grand 50 Tower, Kaohsiung, Taiwan's tallest building from 1992 to 1993.
  - Far Eastern Plaza I & II, Taipei, 1994.
  - Tuntex Sky Tower, Kaohsiung, Taiwan's tallest building from 1997 to 2004.
  - Splendor Hotel, Taichung, 1997.
  - Taiwan Taoyuan International Airport-Terminal 2, Taoyuan, 2000.
  - Chung Tai Chan Monastery, Nantou, the tallest Buddhist temple in the world since 2001, and the tallest Buddhist Building in the world from 2001 to 2006.
  - New Chien-Cheng Circle, Taipei, 2003.
  - Taipei 101, Taipei, Taiwan's tallest building since 2004, and the tallest skyscraper in the world from 2004 to 2009.
- China
  - Post & Telecommunications Center, Tianjin, 1998.
  - Yuda International Trade Center, Zhengzhou, 1999.
  - Fangyuan Mansion, Shenyang, 2001.
  - Jinsha Plaza, Shenyang, 2001.
  - Pangu 7 Star Hotel, Beijing, 2008

== Quotes ==
""I grew up in Taipei in the 1960s, so I was used to seeing tall buildings, but the architectural landscapes I saw in Chicago and New York were dazzling—and so diverse. Seeing these was a magical experience."

"As a Chinese architect trained in the United States, I'm especially interested in architecture that synthesizes Western and Eastern cultures."

"It's rewarding to conceptualize a design that serves not only the client but also represents the culture and serves the needs of a building's inhabitants."

== See also ==
- Taipei 101
- C.Y. Lee, C.P. Wang's architect partner
