= AG Neovo =

Computer electronics manufacturer in Taiwan

Associated Industries China, Inc.
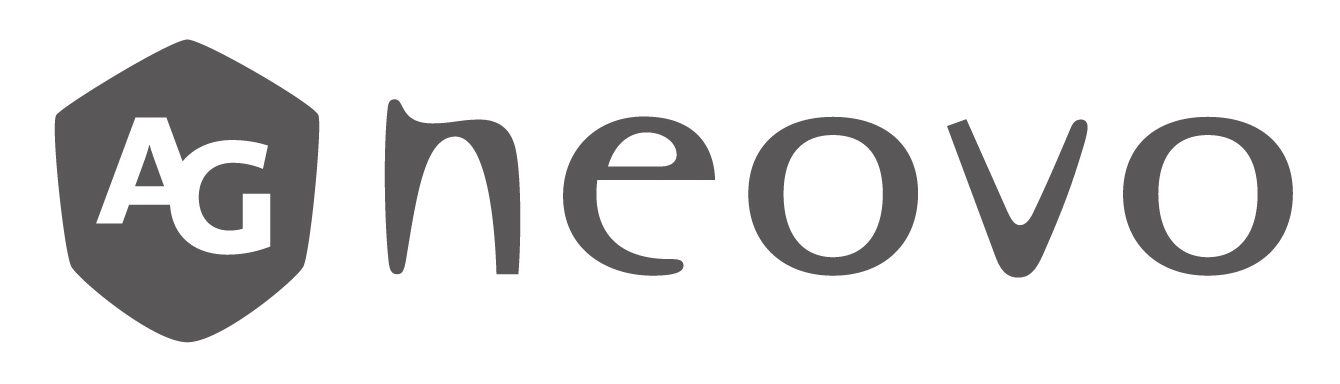

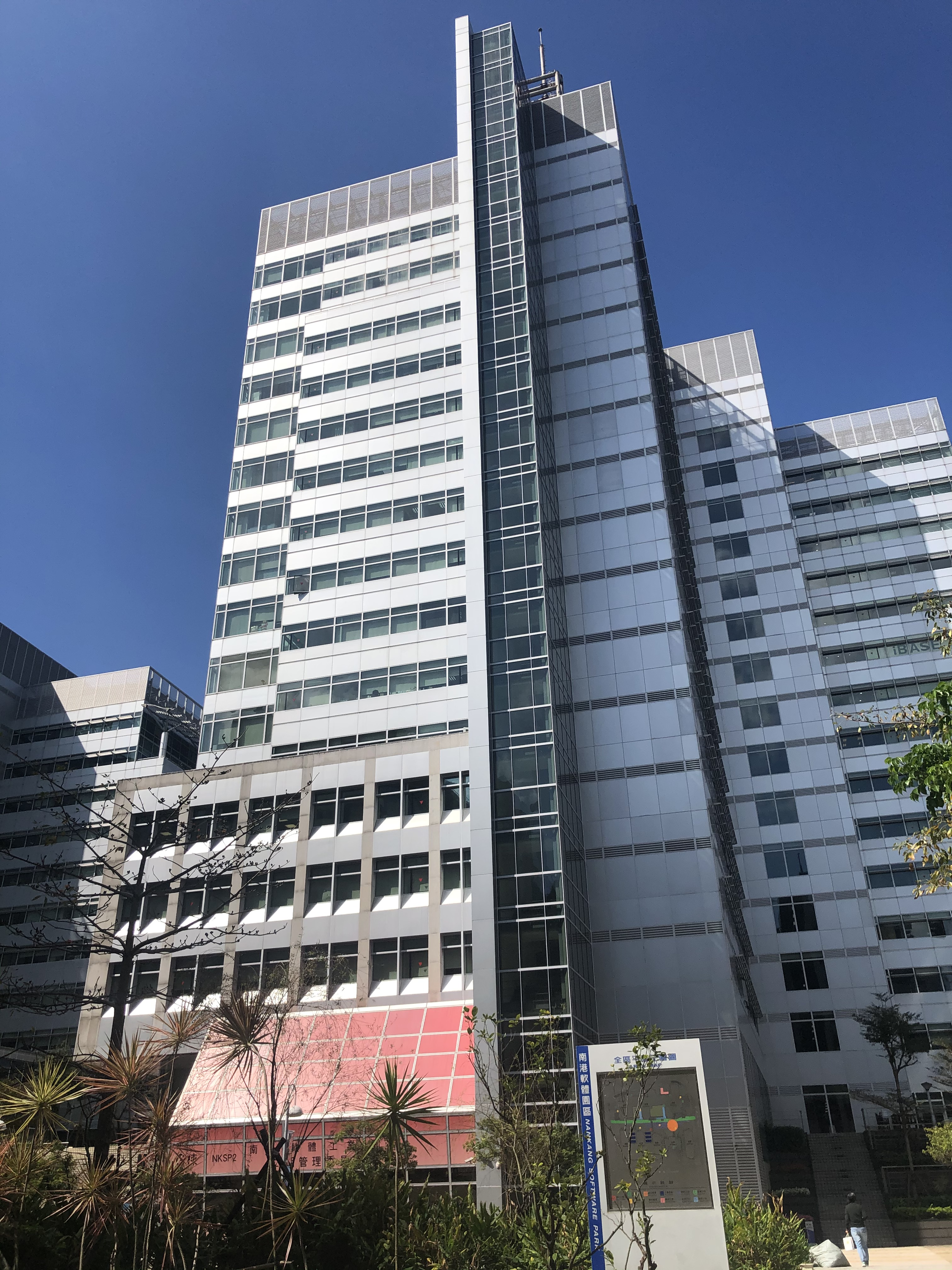
- Taipei Nangang Software Park Building G AG Neovo Global Headquarter Office in Taipei Nangang Software Park
- Trade name: AG Neovo
- Native name: 偉聯科技股份有限公司
- Type: Listed Company
- Traded as: TWSE: 9912
- Industry: Computers, electronics
- Founded: 18 May 1978; 48 years ago
- Headquarters: Park Street, No.3-1, 5F-1 (Nankang Software Park), Nangang District, Taipei, Taiwan
- Area served: Worldwide
- Products: Liquid-crystal display Computer monitor Digital Signage; Commercial Display; Surveillance Display Clinic Display; Touch Display
- Revenue: ▼NT$538.991 Million (Fiscal Year Ended 31 December 2020)
- Operating income: ▲ –NT$14.673 Million (Fiscal Year Ended 31 December 2020)
- Net income: ▲ –NT$30.310 Million (Fiscal Year Ended 31 December 2020)
- Total assets: ▼NT$691.393 Million (Fiscal Year Ended 31 December 2020)
- Total equity: ▼NT$419.575 Million (Fiscal Year Ended 31 December 2020)
- Number of employees: 200
- Subsidiaries: AG Neovo Technology B.V. AG Neovo Technology Corporation
- Website: www.agneovo.com

Associated Industries China, Inc. (Chinese: 偉聯科技股份有限公司; pinyin: wěi lián gǔfèn Yǒuxiàn Gōngsī, TWSE: 9912), known as AG Neovo, is a Taiwan-based multinational computer hardware and electronics company, headquartered in Nangang District, Taipei, Taiwan. Its main products include computer monitors, digital signage, commercial display, large format display, surveillance display, and healthcare displays.
The company was established on May 18, 1978. In 1999, it transitioned its business direction to the development of electronic technology. In October of the same year, the company launched its owned brand - AG Neovo, with branch offices for Europe, Asia, and North America. Its digital photo frames and desktop computer monitors were once awarded by IF Product Design Award and Taiwan Excellence Awards.

== Brand Name ==
AG Neovo. AG is an abbreviation of Aktiengesellschaft, which is a German term for a public limited company. Neovo is said to be a portmanteau of two Greek words, Neo and Vo.

== History ==
Associated Industries China, Inc. was founded in 1978 in Taipei, Taiwan, producing steel intermodal containers as the revenue source. In 1992, it was first listed on the Taiwan Stock Exchange under the ticker code 9912. In October 1999, it launched its own brand name AG Neovo.

In 2000, the company's business direction changed to the hi-tech industry. At the beginning, the business covered both Liquid-crystal display OEM and AG Neovo owned-branded product sales and marketing. In 2003, it withdrew from the OEM business, focusing on brand owned business. The product line includes computer monitors, commercial-grade displays for Closed-circuit television, digital photo frames, video wall, and digital signage display products.

In 2014, it set up the healthcare business unit. This product line includes dental handpieces and portable dental units. In 2017, it set up the Solutions business unit. This product lines includes cloud-based digital signage, Interactive Whiteboard and display management software.

== Products ==
- Monitor and Hardware Displays: Desktop monitors, security monitors, clinic monitors, transportation monitors.
- Digital Signage Displays: Large format commercial displays, video wall displays.
- Touchscreens: Industrial multi-touch displays, interactive flat panel displays, Smart Boards.
- Hardware and Software: Digital signage cloud-based content management system, PID command and control software, interactive meeting software.
- Accessories: Monitor mounts, stand mounts, on-desk mounts, display open frame, video signal extension.
- Dentist Equipment: High speed and low speed handsets, portable dental units.

== See also ==
- List of glossy display branding manufacturers
- List of computer system manufacturers
- List of companies of Taiwan
