= Tuntex Tower =

Skyscraper office building in Da'an, Taipei, Taiwan

Tuntex Tower 敦南東帝士大樓
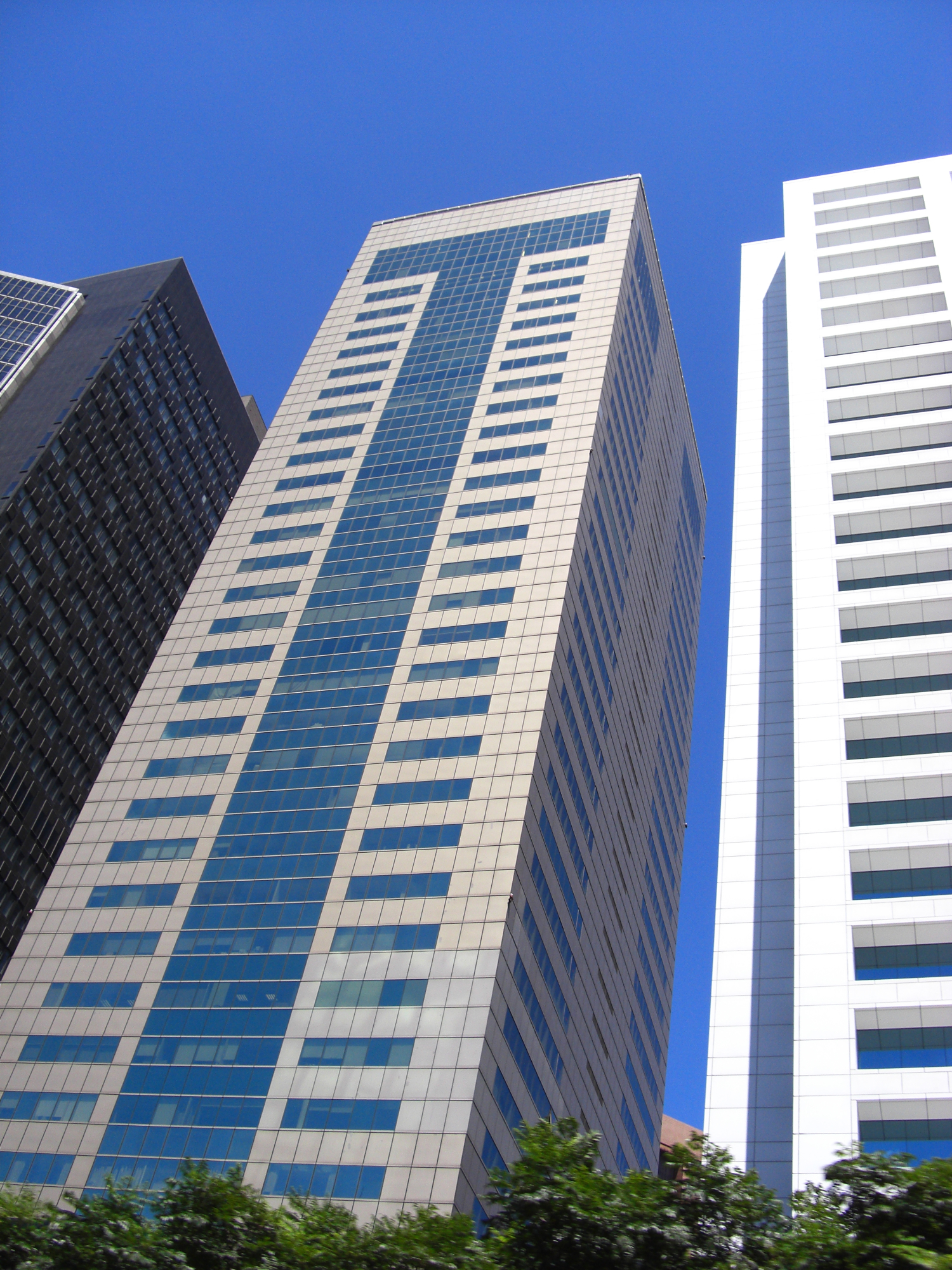

General information
- Type: Office
- Location: 97-101, Section 2, Tun Hwa South Road, Daan District, Taipei, Taiwan
- Coordinates: 25°01′44″N 121°32′57″E
- Completed: 1990

Height
- Architectural: 143 m (469 ft)

Technical details
- Floor count: 38
- Floor area: 49,884.86 m^{2} (536,956.2 sq ft)

Design and construction
- Architect(s): TMA Architects & Associates

The Tuntex Tower (Chinese: 敦南東帝士大樓) is a skyscraper office building in Daan District, Taipei, Taiwan. The height of building is 143 m (469 ft), with a floor area of 49,884.86 m^{2} (536,956.2 sq ft), and it comprises 38 floors above ground, as well as four basement levels. The tower was completed in 1990 and was designed by TMA Architects & Associates. The exterior glass façade of the building forms a pattern to represent the first letter "T" of the Tuntex Group.

== History ==
The building overtook the TWTC International Trade Building in 1990 and became the tallest building in Taiwan from 1990 to 1992, before it was overtaken by Asia-Pacific Financial Plaza in Kaohsiung. However, it remained the tallest in Taipei until it was surpassed by Shin Kong Life Tower in 1993.

A fire broke out on the 10th floor of the tower on 1 July 2001, resulting in seven people being treated for smoke inhalation. The fire broke out not long after the tower did not pass a safety inspection done by the Taipei City Government, during which it failed in a total of five categories: smoke detectors, sprinkler systems, fire alarm systems and carbon dioxide detectors.

== See also ==
- List of tallest buildings in Taiwan
- List of tallest buildings in Taipei

Preceded by TWTC International Trade Building	Tallest building in Taiwan; 1990 – 1992	Succeeded by Asia-Pacific Financial Plaza
