= New Kinpo Group Headquarters =

Skyscraper in Beitou, Taipei, Taiwan

Kinpo Group Headquarters 金仁寶總部大樓
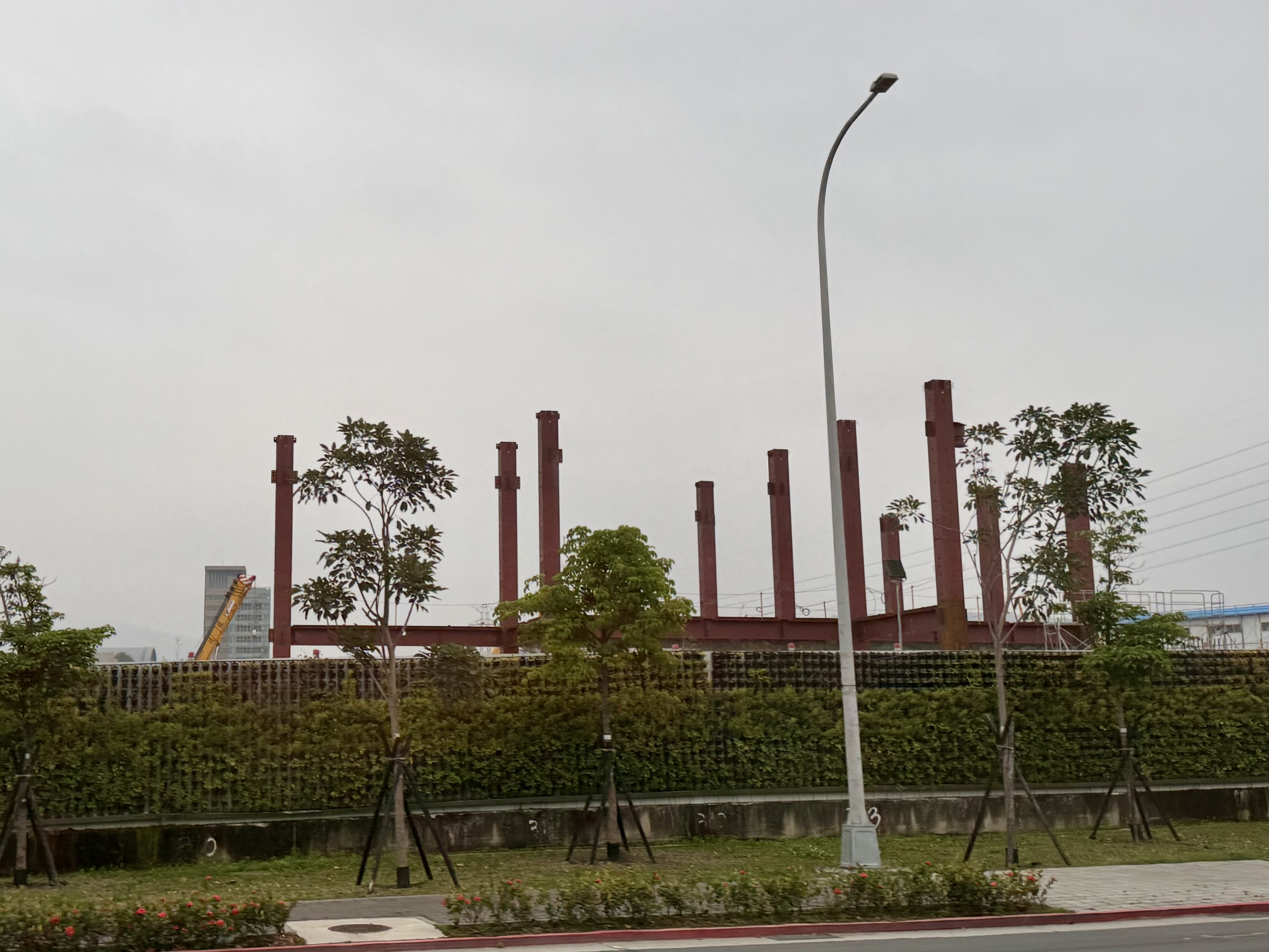
- New Kinpo Group Headquarters construction progress March 2026
- Interactive map of the Kinpo Group Headquarters 金仁寶總部大樓 area

General information
- Status: Under construction
- Type: Office
- Location: Beitou-Shilin Technology Park, Beitou District, Taipei, Taiwan
- Coordinates: 25°6′1.6″N 121°30′49″E
- Construction started: 8 February 2023
- Completed: 2026

Height
- Architectural: 266 m (873 ft)

Technical details
- Floor count: 55 above ground 5 below ground

Design and construction
- Architect: Chu-Yuan Lee

Kinpo Group Headquarters (Chinese: 金仁寶總部大樓; pinyin: Jīnrénbǎo zǒngbù dàlóu), is an under-construction, 266 m (873 ft), 55-storey skyscraper office building located in Beitou-Shilin Technology Park, Beitou District, Taipei, Taiwan. Designed by the famous Taiwanese architect Chu-Yuan Lee, the ground breaking ceremony of the building was held on 8 February 2023. The building will become the fifth tallest building in Taipei and the seventh tallest in Taiwan upon its estimated completion in Q4 of 2026. The building will serve as the new headquarters for New Kinpo Group and is expected to create over 7,000 job openings, bringing roughly NT$22.3 billion in terms of financial benefits for the Taipei City Government.

== See also ==
- List of tallest buildings in Taiwan
- List of tallest buildings in Taipei
- Beitou-Shilin Technology Park
