= List of glossy display branding manufacturers =

Most display manufacturers label their glossy screens under a variety of brand names:

Manufacturer	Brand name
Acer	CrystalBrite, CineCrystal
Acorn	Vybrio
AG Neovo	NeoV Optical Glass
Ahtec	Glare
Alienware	ClearView
Apple	Glossy Display
ASUS	Color Shine, Glare Type
Averatec	AveraBrite
Dell	TrueLife
Edge10	Optic10 Toughened Optical Glass
Everex	Diamond Brite
Fujitsu	Crystal View, SuperFine
GammaTech	DuraBrite
Gateway	Ultrabright
HP/Compaq	BrightView Infinity
IBM/Lenovo	VibrantView
LG	Fine Bright
NEC	OptiClear, SuperShine
Packard Bell	Diamond View
Philips	Crystal Clear
ProStar	GlassView
Sager	Super Clear Glare Type
Samsung	SuperBright, Ultra Clear Panel
Sony	XBRITE, X-black, Clear Bright, Clear Photo LCD
Toshiba	TruBrite, Clear SuperView
