= Neihu Technology Park =

Industrial park in Taipei, Taiwan

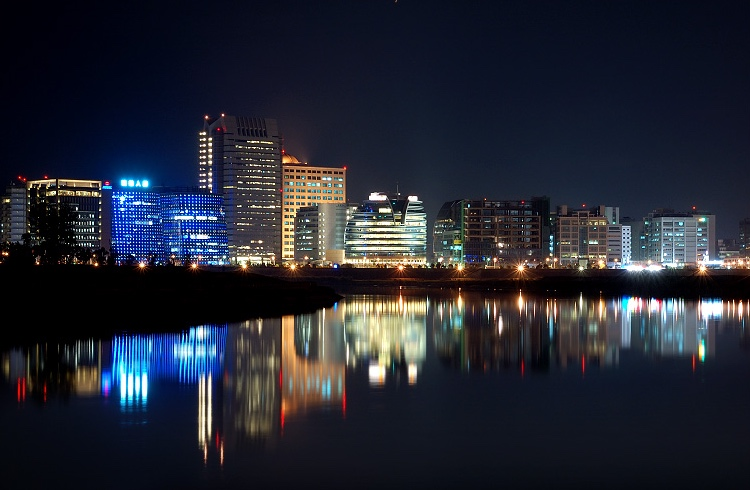
Neihu Technology Park at night

The Neihu Technology Park (Chinese: 內湖科技園區; pinyin: Nèihú Kējì Yuánqū) is an industrial park located in the western part of Neihu District, Taipei, Taiwan. Established as Taiwan's first metropolitan technology park developed through both private investment and government deregulation, it has become a key hub for the knowledge-based economy and high-tech industries in Northern Taiwan.

== Location ==
Neihu Technology Park spans an area of approximately 5.42 km^{2} (2.09 sq mi). Its boundaries include Tiding Boulevard on the east, the southern side of Section 1 of Neihu Road (from Tiding Boulevard to Gangqian Road), the western side of Gangqian Road (from Neihu Road to Ruiguang Road), and Ruiguang Road (up to Minquan East Road).

== Overview ==
As a cornerstone of Taiwan's high-tech sector, Neihu Technology Park connects technology parks across the country via a comprehensive highway network. It hosts industries focused on research and development, marketing, and services in areas such as Information Technology, Communications, Digital Content, and Biotechnology.

In recent years, the park has seen significant growth. By 2017, it registered 5,750 companies and employed 156,808 people, with annual revenue reaching NT$4.9 trillion. Development within the park has reached 95%, prompting the Taipei City Government to expand available space by integrating nearby industrial and business zones. Neihu Technology Park has positioned itself as an attractive location for global corporate headquarters. Companies such as ]Lite-On, Compal Electronics, BenQ, Samsung Electronics, Nvidia, and LG Electronics have established their headquarters or branches within the park.

== Transportation ==
=== Metro ===
- Wenhu line:
  - Xihu metro station
  - Gangqian metro station

== See also ==
- Economy of Taiwan
- Beitou-Shilin Technology Park
- Nankang Software Park
