= Beitou-Shilin Technology Park =

Industrial park in Taipei, Taiwan

The Beitou-Shilin Technology Park (BSTP; Chinese: 北投士林科技園區; pinyin: Běitóu Shìlín Kējì Yuánqū) is an industrial park located in the Zhoumei area on the south side of Beitou District, Taipei City, Taiwan.

== Location ==
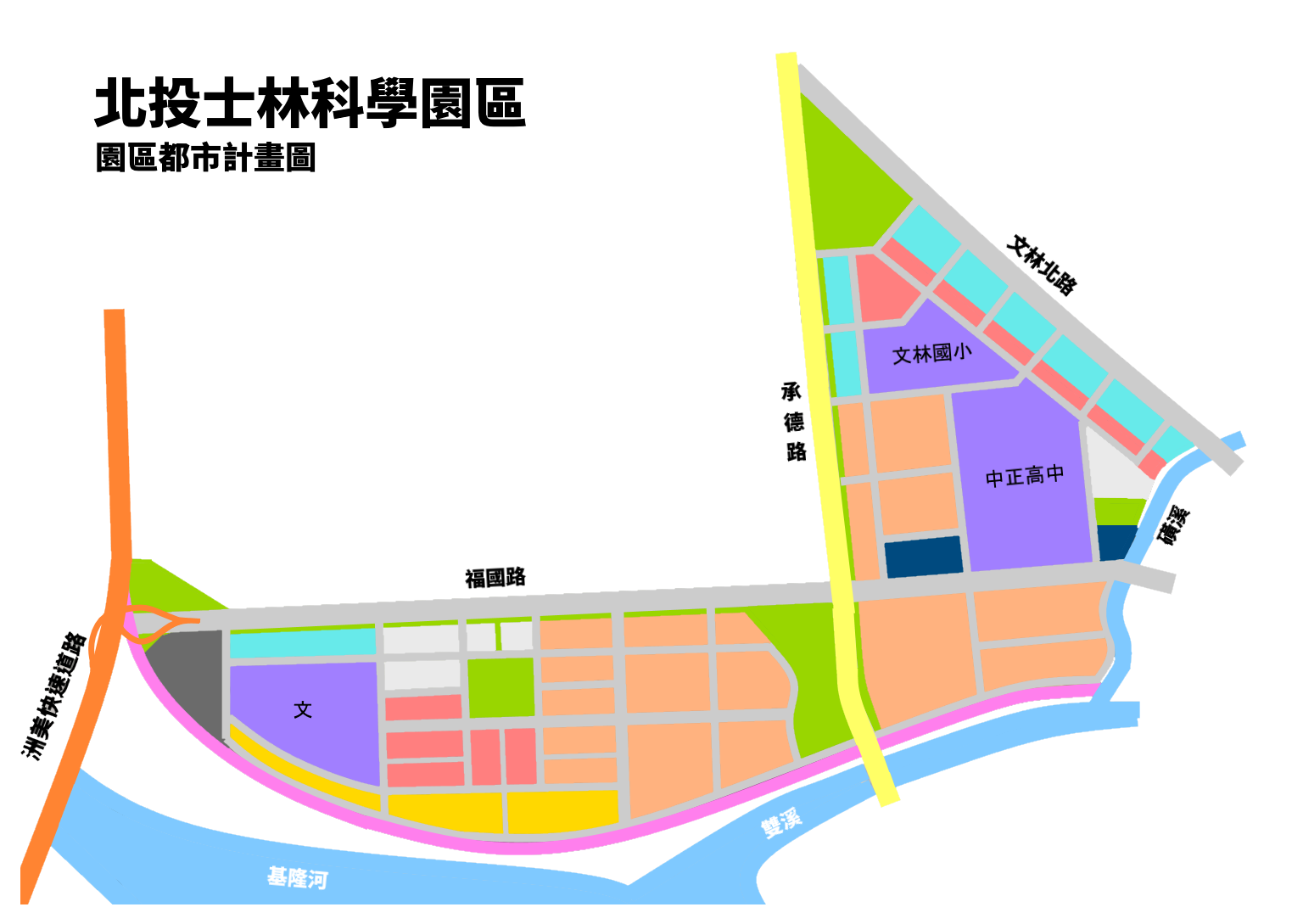
Map of Beitou-Shilin Technology Park

Beitou-Shilin Technology Park covers an area of about 94,000 m^{2} (1,010,000 sq ft). It is located at the junction of Beitou District and Shilin District, bordering on academic landmarks such as Taipei Children's Amusement Park, National Taiwan Science Education Center, and Taipei Astronomical Museum. There are several hospitals, National Yang Ming Chiao Tung University, Taipei Veterans General Hospital and other landmarks nearby. Therefore, the park is developed with the "smart health industry" as the main axis, and is regarded by Taipei City as the next emerging industry development area in the city.

== Overview ==
The Beitou-Shilin Technology Park aims to introduce private capital and resources, attract high-end industries such as ICT, biotechnology, other emerging technologies as well as promoting the overall industrial development of the city.

== Transportation ==
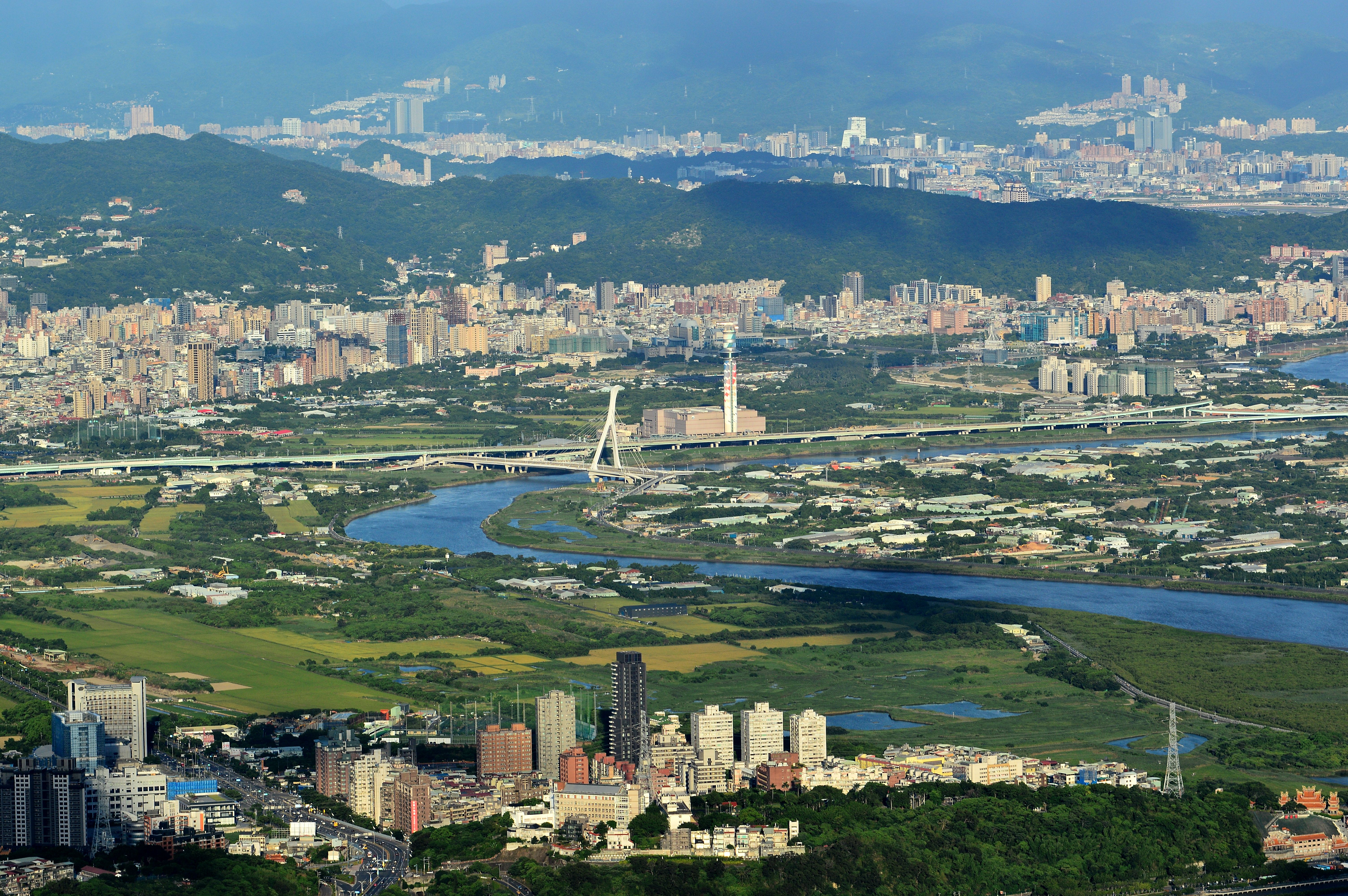
ZhouMei Expressway

=== Metro ===
- Tamsui–Xinyi line:
  - Mingde metro station
  - Zhishan metro station

=== Road ===
- ZhouMei Expressway

== Notable buildings ==
- New Kinpo Group Headquarters

== See also ==
- Economy of Taiwan
- Nankang Software Park
- Neihu Technology Park
