= Chu-yuan Lee =

Taiwanese architect

Chu-yuan Lee 李祖原
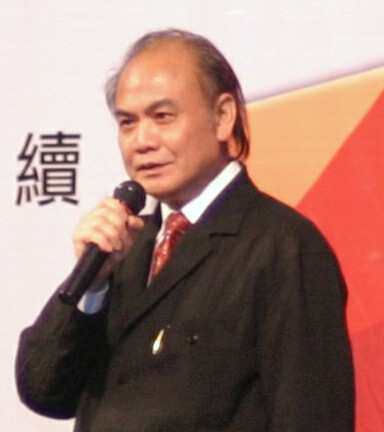
- Born: 30 December 1938 (age 87); Jiedong, Jieyang, Guangdong, Republic of China
- Education: National Cheng Kung University (BS); Princeton University (MArch)
- Occupation: Architect
- Buildings: Taipei 101

Chu-yuan (C. Y.) Lee (Chinese: 李祖原; pinyin: Lǐ Zǔyuán; Wade–Giles: Li Tsu-yuan; born 30 December 1938) is a Taiwanese architect best known for designing the skyscraper Taipei 101.

== Biography ==
Lee was born in Guangdong, China, on December 30, 1938. After high school, he graduated from National Cheng Kung University with a Bachelor of Science (B.S.) and earned a Master of Architecture (M.Arch.) from Princeton University in 1966. He directed the design of Taipei 101, the world's tallest skyscraper at the time of completion, in 2004.

== List of major designs ==
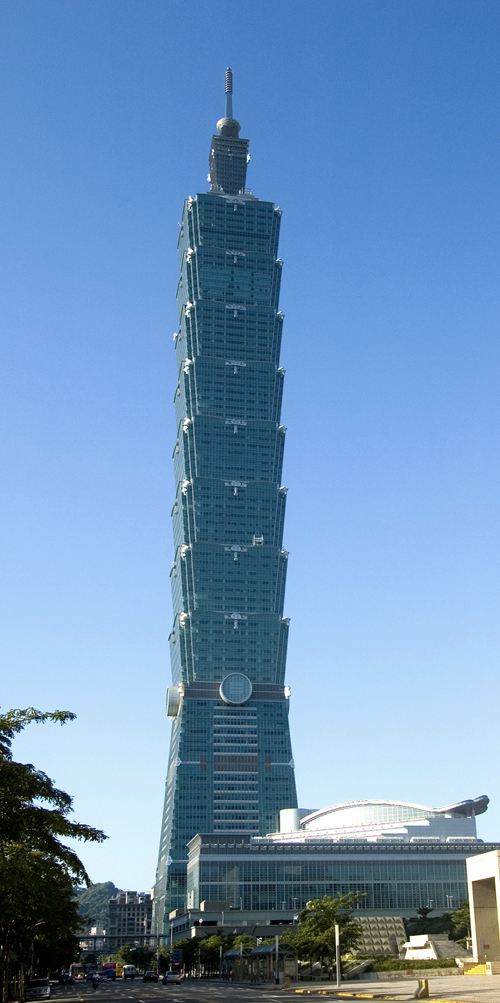
Taipei 101 is the most famous design by C. Y. Lee.

=== Taiwan ===
- Hung Kuo Building, Taipei, 1989.
- Asia Plaza Building, Taipei, 1990.
- Grand 50 Tower, Kaohsiung, Taiwan's tallest building from 1992 to 1993.
- Far Eastern Plaza I & II, Taipei, 1994.
- 85 Sky Tower, Kaohsiung, Taiwan's tallest building from 1997 to 2004.
- The Splendor Hotel Taichung, Taichung, 1997.
- Lihpao Land, Taichung, 1998.
- Chung Tai Chan Monastery, Puli, Nantou, 2001.
- New Chien-Cheng Circle, Taipei, 2003.
- Taipei 101, Taipei, Taiwan's tallest building since 2004, and the tallest skyscraper in the world from 2004 to 2010.
- Glory Tower, Keelung, 2007.
- Taipei Bus Station, Taipei, 2009.
- Farglory Financial Center, Taipei, 2012.
- Farglory THE ONE, Kaohsiung, 2020.
- New Kinpo Group Headquarters, Taipei, 2026.

=== China ===
- Post & Telecommunications Center, Tianjin, 1998.
- Yuda International Trade Center, Zhengzhou, 1999.
- Fangyuan Mansion, Shenyang, 2001.
- Jinsha Plaza, Shenyang, 2001.
- Ten-faced Puxian Stupa on Jinding, Mount Emei, 2006
- Pangu 7 Star Hotel, Beijing, 2008

== See also ==
- Taipei 101
- C. P. Wang – C. Y. Lee's architect partner.
