= Chang-Gu World Trade Center =

Skyscraper in Kaohsiung, Taiwan

- 長谷世貿聯合國大樓
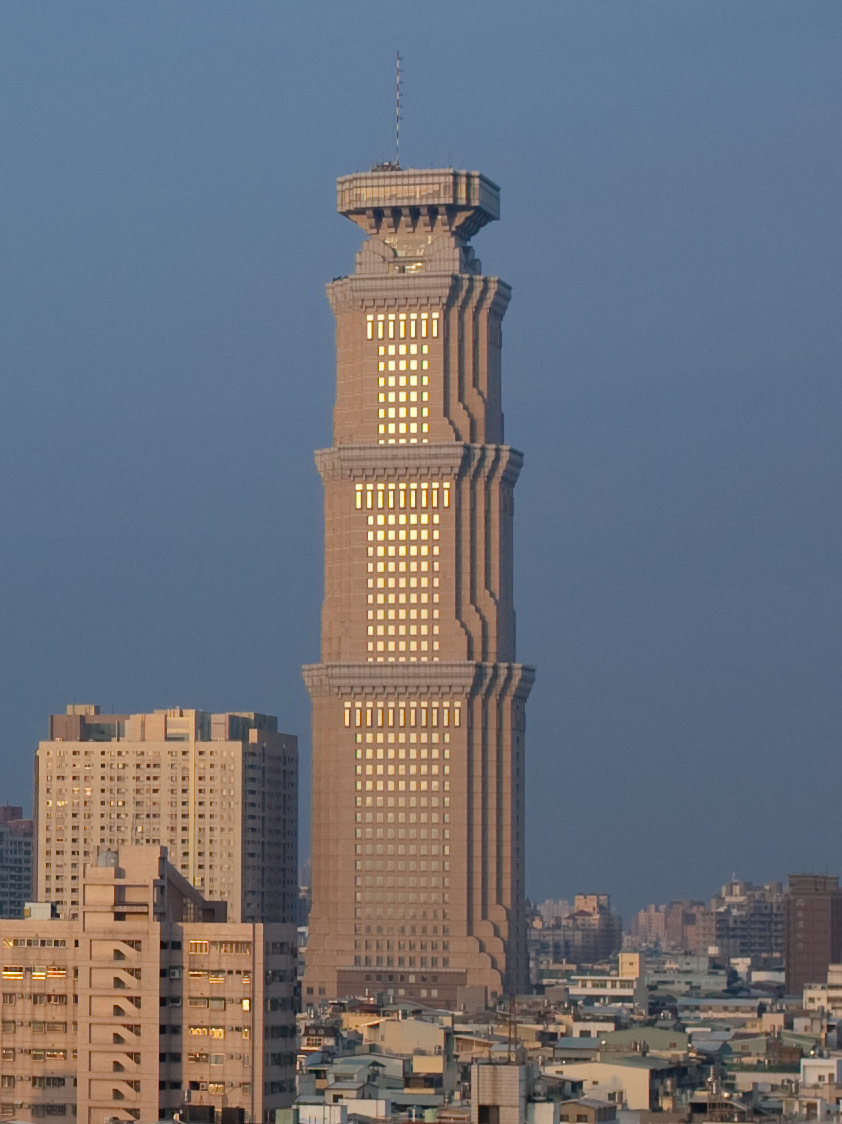

- Location within Taiwan
- Alternative names: Grand 50 Tower

Record height
- Tallest in Taiwan from 1992 to 1993^{[I]}
- Preceded by: Asia-Pacific Financial Plaza
- Surpassed by: Shin Kong Life Tower

General information
- Status: Completed
- Type: Skyscraper
- Architectural style: Oriental revivalism
- Classification: Commercial
- Location: Sanmin District, 80 Min-Tzu 1st Road, Kaohsiung City, Taiwan
- Coordinates: 22°38′35.2″N 120°18′53.7″E
- Completed: 1992
- Client: Chang Ku Building Company

Height
- Architectural: 222 metres (728 ft)
- Tip: 222 metres (728 ft)

Technical details
- Floor count: 55 (50 above and 5 below)
- Grounds: 83,310 square metres (896,700 sq ft)

Design and construction
- Architecture firm: C.Y. Lee & Partners
- Structural engineer: Evergreen Consulting Engineering
- Main contractor: Turner Construction

Other information
- Parking: 281-space underground parking garage

The Chang-Gu World Trade Center (Chinese: 長谷世貿聯合國大樓; pinyin: Chánggǔ Shìmào Liánhéguó Dàlóu), also known as Grand 50 Tower, is a 222-metre (728 ft) tall skyscraper in Sanmin District of Kaohsiung, Taiwan. It was completed in 1992 and was designed by C.Y. Lee & Partners, who also designed the 85 Sky tower, and the Taipei 101. It was the first building in Taiwan to reach a height of 50 floors, as is highlighted by its alternative name.

== History ==
After its completion in 1992, the Chang-Gu World Trade Center became the tallest building in Taiwan surpassing the 169.8 meters high Asia-Pacific Financial Plaza in Kaohsiung. But it only kept this title for 6 months when the Shin Kong Life Tower in Taipei was completed on 21 December 1993. It kept the title as the tallest building in Kaohsiung for 5 years until the completion of the 85 Sky Tower in 1997. The building is currently the 188th tallest building in the world and 5th tallest in Taiwan.

The building follows a Chinese pagoda style and has an octagonal base to be stable against high winds which are typical in Taiwan as it is prone to typhoons. During the building’s test phase, it was tested to pressures equivalent of wind speeds in excess of 300 mph (480 km/h). It was also tested to withstand earthquakes which are commonplace in Taiwan.

The building’s crown follows the same perimeter as the rest of the building however it stands on an elaborate, thin base. The underside of the crown is lit up at night, however, the rest is not. The top floor was home to the Grand 50 Club which was managed by the Peninsula Group based in Hong Kong. The Grand 50 Club was known as a prestigious night-spot. As of 2024, the top floor is closed for renovation.

The building contains a car park with 280 spaces available. This located underneath the building, covering five underground floors. The atrium is 21 stories high and is clad in Spanish granite. At the top of the building is a helicopter pad.

== Transportation ==
The building is accessible within walking distance North East from Kaohsiung Station of the Kaohsiung MRT or Taiwan Railway.

== See also ==
- 85 Sky Tower
- List of tallest buildings in Kaohsiung
- List of tallest buildings in Taiwan

Preceded by Asia-Pacific Financial Plaza	Tallest building in Taiwan; 1992 – 1993	Succeeded by Shin Kong Life Tower
