= Asia-Pacific Financial Plaza =

Skyscraper in Lingya, Kaohsiung, Taiwan

- 宏總亞太財經廣場
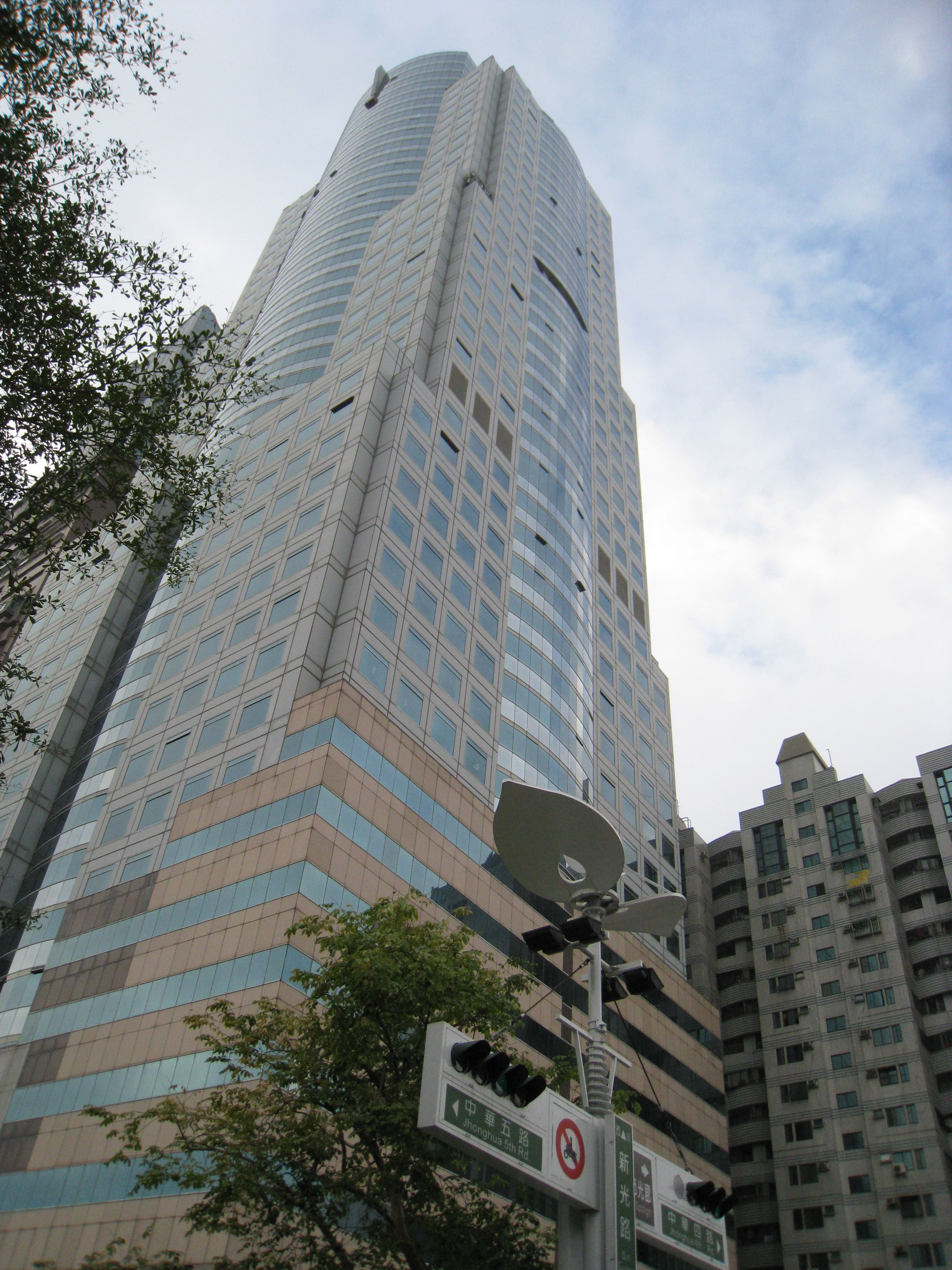
- Interactive map of the Asia-Pacific Financial Plaza area

General information
- Status: Completed
- Type: skyscraper
- Classification: Commercial
- Location: Lingya, Kaohsiung, Taiwan
- Coordinates: 22°36′42″N 120°18′07″E
- Completed: 1992

Height
- Architectural: 169.8 metres (557 ft)
- Tip: 169.8 metres (557 ft)

Technical details
- Floor count: 47 (42 above and 5 below)
- Lifts/elevators: 15
- Grounds: 72,331.82 square metres (778,573.2 sq ft)

Design and construction
- Architecture firm: Hoy Architects & Associates

The Asia-Pacific Financial Plaza (Chinese: 宏總亞太財經廣場; pinyin: Hóng zǒng yàtài cáijīng guǎngchǎng) is a 169.8-metre (557 ft) tall skyscraper in Lingya District of Kaohsiung, Taiwan. It was completed in 1992 and was designed by Hoy Architects & Associates. It was the first building in Taiwan to reach a height of 150 m.

== History ==
After its completion in April 1992, the Asia-Pacific Financial Plaza became the tallest building in Taiwan surpassing the 143.4-meter-high Tuntex Tower in Taipei. However, it only kept this title for 3 months when the Chang-Gu World Trade Center in Kaohsiung was completed on 9 July 1992.

Preceded by Tuntex Tower	Tallest building in Taiwan; April 1992 – July 1992	Succeeded by Chang-Gu World Trade Center

== See also ==
- List of tallest buildings in Asia
- List of tallest buildings in Kaohsiung
- List of tallest buildings in Taiwan
