= Pangu Plaza =

Building in Beijing, China

Coordinates: 39.9896°N 116.3866°E

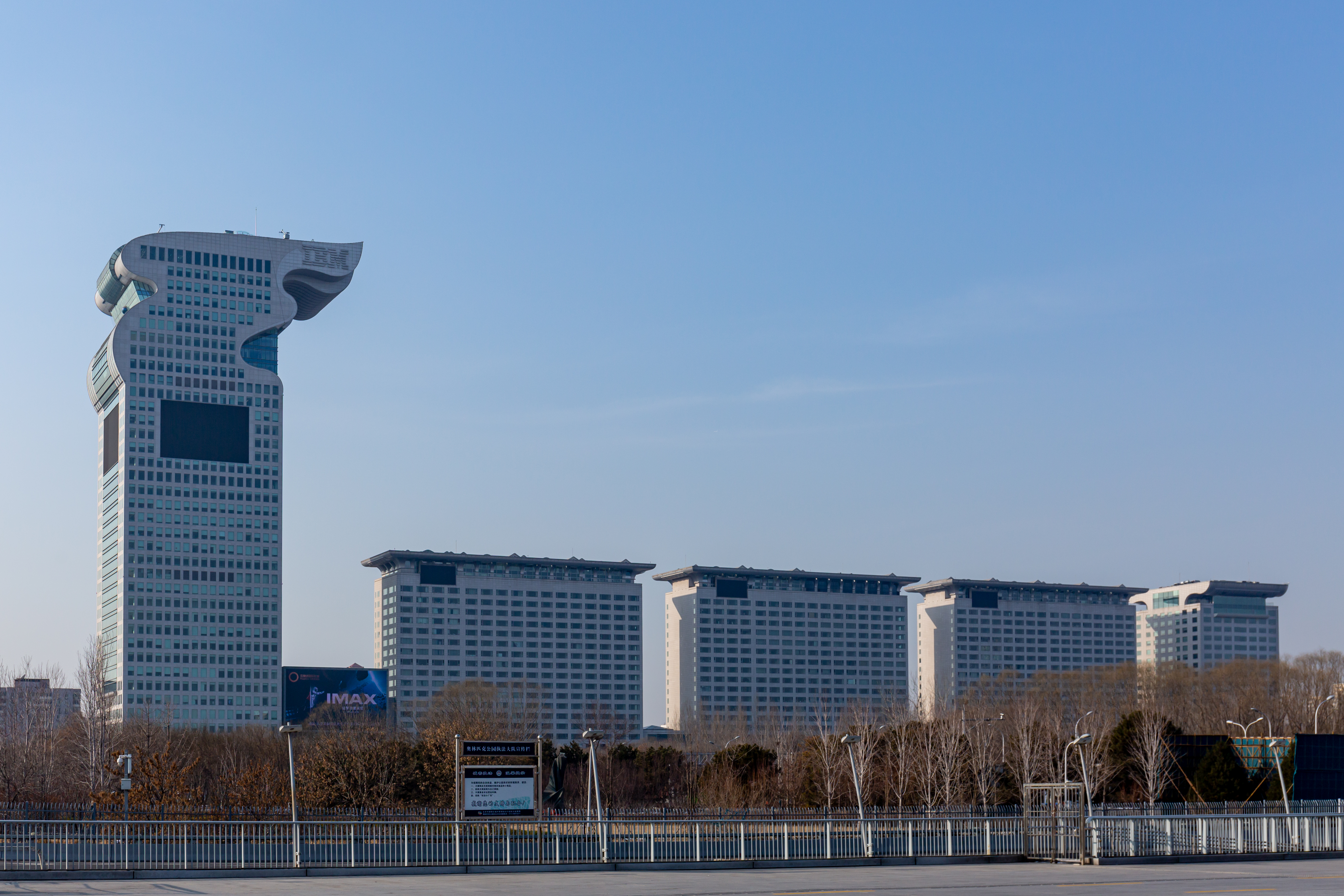
Pangu Plaza in January 2020

The Pangu Plaza (Chinese: 盘古大观) is a five building mixed use complex comprising an office building, three apartment buildings, clubs, retail shops and the Pangu 7 Star Hotel (Pangu Seven Star Hotel), located at 27, North 4th Ring Middle Road, Chaoyang, Beijing, China.

Shaped like a dragon, it is a neighbour of many of the 2008 Beijing Olympic venues, including the Beijing National Stadium (Bird Nest) and the Beijing National Aquatics Center (Water Cube). Also, it is close to the National Library, the fourth largest library in the world and the largest one in China.

The Pangu Plaza was designed by Chu-Yuan Lee of C.Y. Lee & Partners, the Taiwan-based architecture firm responsible for Taipei 101, for the world's first traditional Chinese “courtyard in the sky". The Pangu 7 Star Hotel occupies the first block of the "Pangu", and it contains two pavilions, a temple, a French restaurant, a Japanese restaurant, 234 guest rooms, with 140 suites and a 600-metre-long (2,000 ft) corridor.

The Pangu Plaza was financed and built by Guo Wengui in 2008.

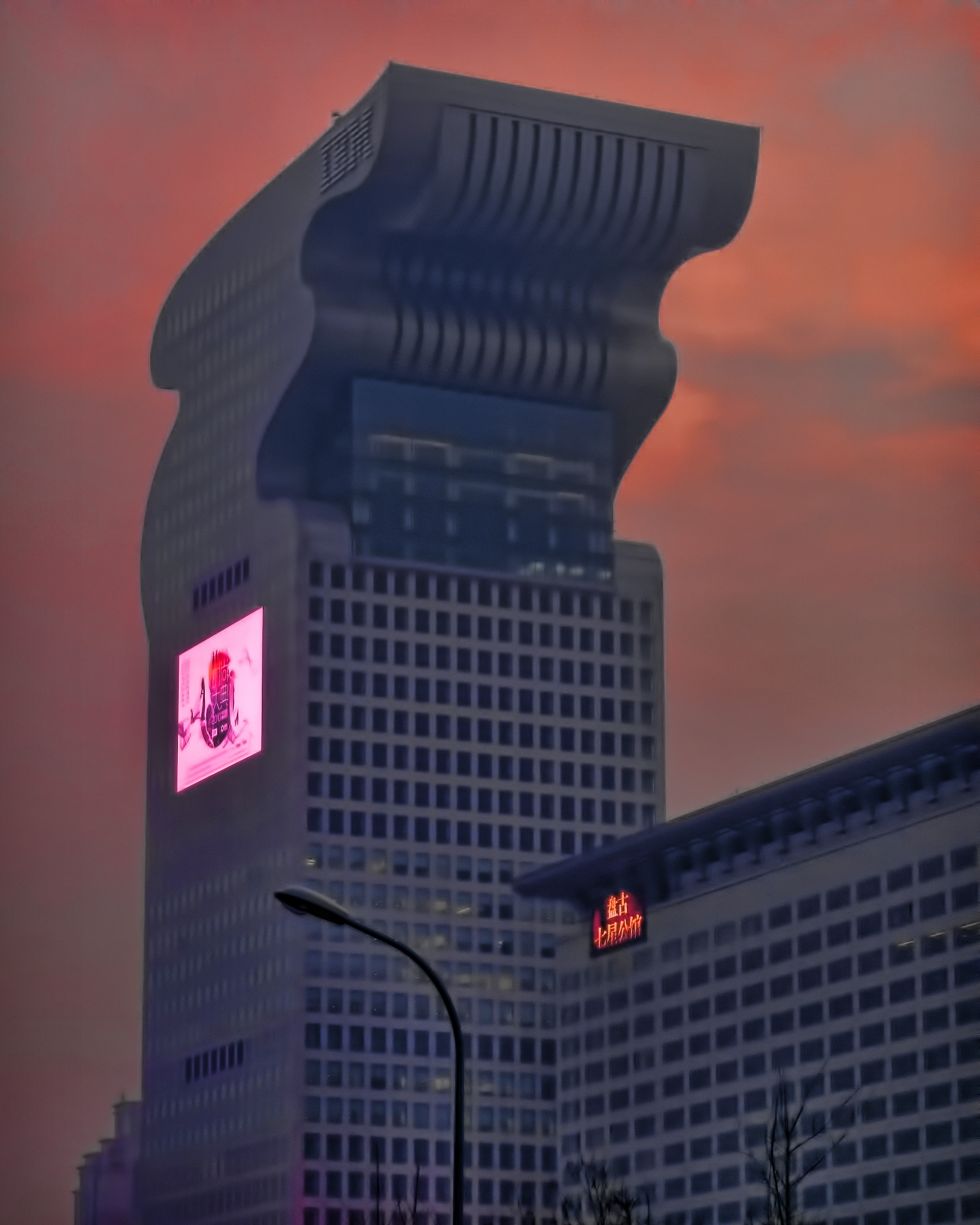
Pangu Plaza Tall Building at Dusk, showing illuminated advertising panels and smog

== Rating and further information ==
The “tail” building of Pangu Plaza "Pangu 7 Star Hotel" is one of the world's only two 7-star hotels. The hotel is named "Pangu 7 Star Hotel Beijing" even though no traditional organisation or formal body awards or recognises any rating over "five-star deluxe", and despite that customarily a hotel does not award itself stars. Traditionally, hotel rating have a maximum of 5 stars. The Pangu 7 Star Hotel is considered to be the top luxury hotel in Beijing. Bill Gates, the founder of Microsoft Corp., stayed at the hotel during the Beijing Olympics.

Chinese authorities seized ownership of the tallest building of Pangu Plaza in 2016 and auctioned it for nearly 5.19 billion yuan. This building also houses the headquarters of IBM's China division.

== Demolition of the Dragon Head ==
In 2022, the "dragon head" of the primary tower was demolished and replaced with a simpler rectangular crown.

== See also ==
- List of hotels in Beijing
