= Shin Kong Life Tower =

Skyscraper in Taipei, Taiwan

Shin Kong Life Tower 新光人壽保險摩天大樓
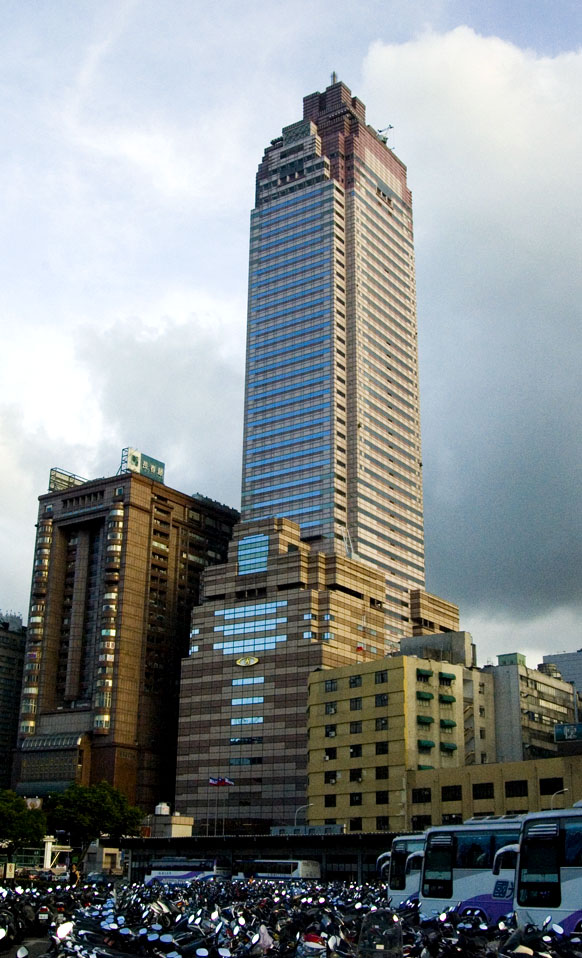

General information
- Type: Mixed
- Location: 66 Zhongxiao West Road; Zhongzheng District, Taipei, Taiwan
- Coordinates: 25°2′45.40″N 121°30′55.21″E
- Completed: December 21st, 1993

Height
- Antenna spire: 245 m (804 ft)

Technical details
- Floor count: 51

Design and construction
- Architect(s): Kaku Morin

Shin Kong Life Tower (Chinese: 新光人壽保險摩天大樓; pinyin: Xīnguāng Rénshòu Bǎoxiǎn Mótiān Dàlóu), at 51 stories and a height of 245 meters (803.8 ft), is one of Taiwan's earliest skyscrapers. The rose-colored tower topped by a pyramid stands in Zhongzheng District, Taipei, and dates from 1993. Its first twelve floors and two underground floors house a Shin Kong Mitsukoshi Department Store; the remaining floors provide office space and serve as headquarters for the Shin Kong Life insurance company. The building stands across Zhongxiao Road from Taipei Main Station near the Asiaworld Department Store.

The Shin Kong Life Tower was Taiwan's tallest building when it opened in 1993. The twin towers of the nearby Far Eastern Plaza, built at the same time, approached it in height. In 1997, the Tuntex 85 Sky Tower in the city of Kaohsiung became Taiwan's tallest. New height records were then set by Taipei 101 in 2004.

== Design and construction ==
The site currently occupied by the Shin Kong Life Tower was home to the luxurious Taiwan Railway Hotel from 1908 to 1945 when it was destroyed by allied bombing. The hotel was the most luxurious in Taiwan and mostly served a Japanese and foreign clientele.

The 10,000-square-meter plot of land across from Taipei Main Station was owned by four companies in 1981 when discussions began about ways to develop the site. Agreement on a plan was never reached and ownership of the land passed to two companies in 1985. The company that held the eastern half, Asiaworld International Group, built the Asiaworld Department Store on its parcel; the store opened in 1990. The company that held the western half, Shin Kong Life Insurance Company, hired Kaku Morin Group (KMG) Architects and Engineers of Japan to build a dual-use tower that would house offices and a major department store.

Space limitations and heavy traffic at the site made the task a challenge. KMG created a 1,170-square-meter plaza around the tower by setting the front of the building 31 m back from the street and setting other sides back to allow wide pedestrian walkways. Inspectors from National Taiwan University were consulted to help ensure the building's stability in earthquakes. The design featured an observatory level at the 46th floor. Separate elevators were installed to serve department store customers, office workers, and visitors to the observatory. Mindful of Taiwan's typhoons and tropical sun, designers used aluminum for the exterior so it would weather well. The rose color chosen for the exterior was inspired by the national flowers of both Taiwan and Japan, the plum blossom and cherry blossom, respectively.

Construction of the Shin Kong Life Tower began in 1989. The building was completed at a cost of US$270 million and opened on December 21, 1993.

As a design the Shin Kong Life Tower drew a shrug from architects in and beyond Taiwan. It was generally regarded as a rather plain and old-fashioned design with only height to offer as a distinguishing characteristic. Some saw a design flaw in the placement of retail and office entrances on the same side of the building. Architect Kaku Morin conceded that his design made no novel architectural statement but expressed satisfaction in producing a "healthy" structure. "Construction is as important as design," he told the Taiwan Review in 1995. "A building is like a human body--if it is not healthy, it is nothing no matter how beautiful it is."

== Today ==
The Shin Kong Life Tower lived an especially bustling life in the decade after it opened. Its 46th-floor observatory, the highest in Taiwan at the time, opened to the public in 1994 under the management of TopView Taipei Observatory. Over the next twelve years the observatory hosted over four million visitors. The number of guests dropped dramatically after Taipei 101 opened a new observatory at nearly twice the height in January 2005, however, and TopView closed when the company's lease expired in December 2006. Now the 46th-floor observatory is occupied by Naturally-Plus as their headquarters for Taiwan operation and the entrance is free of charge for their members.

Other retailers in the building continue to maintain a busy existence. The location of the tower across from Taipei Main Station ensures heavy pedestrian traffic along the Shin Kong Mitsukoshi and Asiaworld storefronts. Weekdays find the streets filled with students attending 'cram schools' in the area. Weekends find Taipei residents enjoying outdoor concerts in the plaza or on the grounds of the nearby station.

== Nomenclature ==
English speakers sometimes refer to the Shin Kong Life Tower as the "Mitsukoshi Building" because that store's name appears on the tower's exterior. This invites confusion, though, as the store operates in more than one location. Taipei 101 has its own Shin Kong Mitsukoshi outlet facing Shin Kong Mitsukoshi Square.

== Transportation ==
The tower is accessible within walking distance south west of Taipei Railway Station.

== See also ==
- List of tallest buildings in Taiwan
- List of tallest buildings in Taipei

Preceded by Chang-Gu World Trade Center	Tallest building in Taiwan; 1993–1997	Succeeded by Tuntex Sky Tower
