= Chien-Cheng Circle =

Former food market in Taipei, Taiwan

- 建成圓環
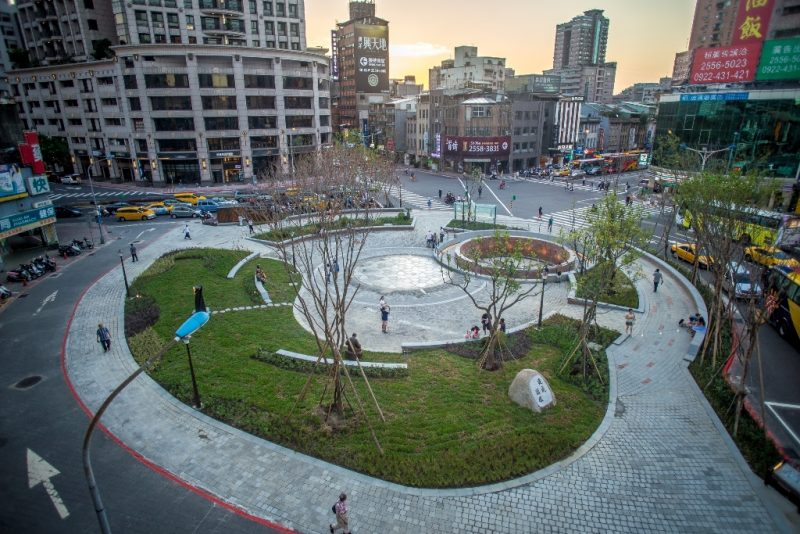

Location
- Datong, Taipei, Taiwan
- Coordinates: 25°03′14″N 121°30′53″E

Construction
- Type: Roundabout
- Opened: 1908 (original structure); 2017 (current structure)

The Chien-Cheng Circle (Chinese: 建成圓環; pinyin: Jiànchéng Yuánhuán; Pe̍h-ōe-jī: Kiàn-sêng Îⁿ-khoân) or Taipei Circle (Chinese: 臺北圓環; pinyin: Táiběi Yuánhuán; Pe̍h-ōe-jī: Tâi-pak Îⁿ-khoân) is a public plaza in Datong District, Taipei, Taiwan. Formerly it was a traffic circle, and the area used to host a bustling night market.

== History ==
The original night market was a circular structure located on a roundabout between Nanjing West Road (南京西路) and Chongqing North Road (重慶北路). It covered an area of 1,722 square meters and dated to the Japanese colonial era.

=== Beginnings ===
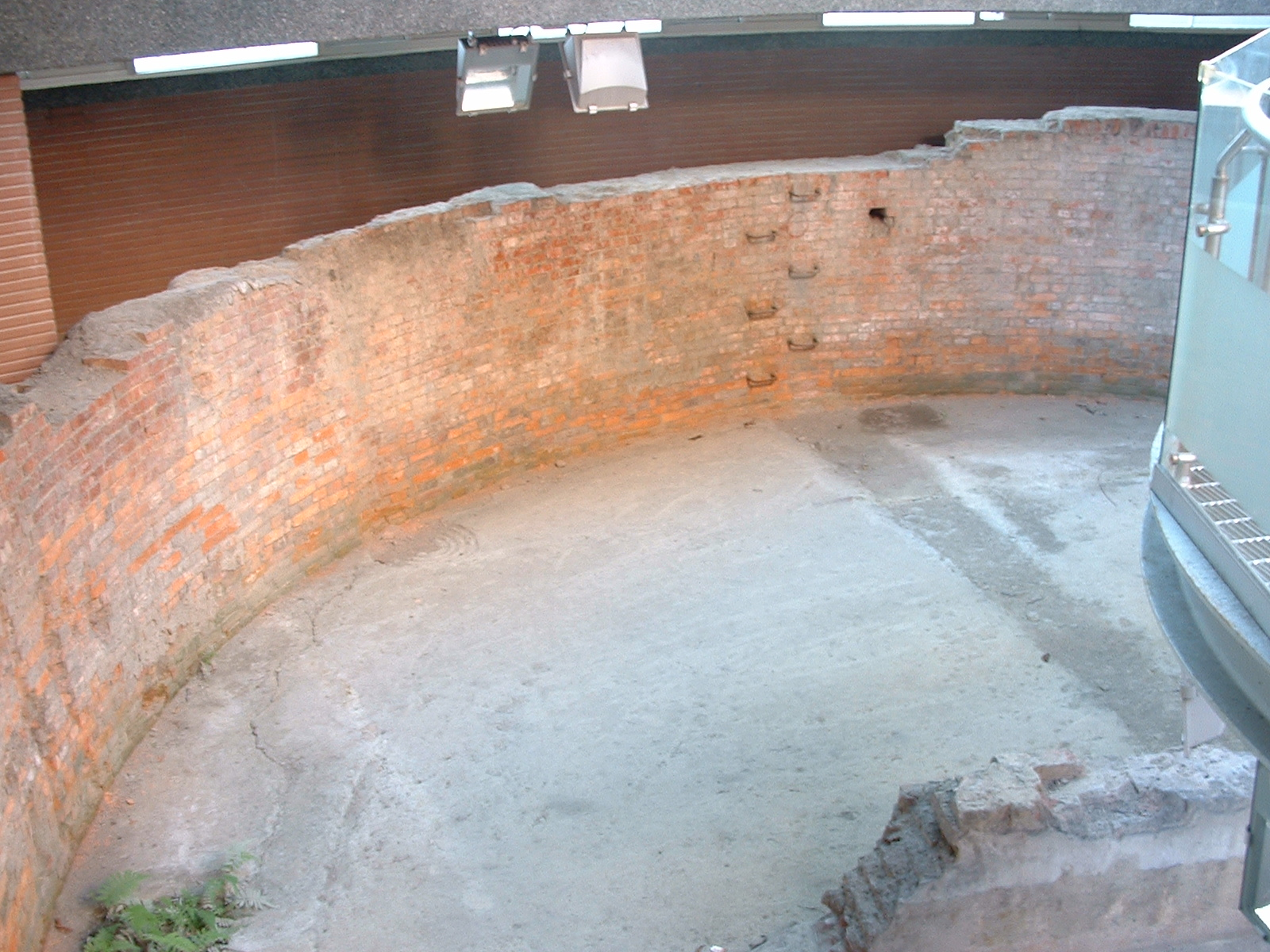
Remnants of the Japanese era reservoir at Chien-Cheng Circle.

The circle started out as a fish pond at the intersections of the two roads which the Japanese Government at the planted with trees at the edges and turned into a park. Due to its location, the park attracted a wide variety of cart-based food vendors turning it into the most popular night market in northern Taiwan during the Japanese rule, with the vendors operating well beyond 4am. A bomb shelter was also constructed there during World War II and the pond used as a reservoir for water to put out fires from air raids.

Following the war, the reservoir was drained and vendors began setting up permanently at the park, growing into and organizing the space among themselves organically, eventually converting all the park space into restaurants. The 1960s and 1970s were the heyday of the night market with booths numbering close to 200 and serving Taiwanese snacks and delicacies such as glutinous rice dumplings, oyster omelettes, fish ball noodles, and unfried spring rolls.

=== Reconstruction ===
Two fires in 1993 and 1999 contributed to the market's decline, and in March 2001 Taipei Mayor Ma Ying-jeou ordered the demolition of Chien-Cheng Circle. He proposed its reconstruction as part of several projects to revitalize Taipei's older districts. At 10 AM on 29 March 2001, the Chien-Cheng Circle was demolished to make way for its new construction located five meters further south of the original site. The new two-storey cylindrical glass building was designed by Taiwan-based architect C. Y. Lee and cost the Taipei city government NT$160 million in construction fees. An additional NT$50 million in compensation was paid to vendors of the former building. The roundabout was transformed into a crossroad and the surrounding trees were moved to an elementary school in the Xinyi district. During the reconstruction, the engineering team unearthed an old reservoir built by Japanese soldiers during World War II at the center of the circle. The city government decided to make the reservoir the 105th historic spot in Taipei.

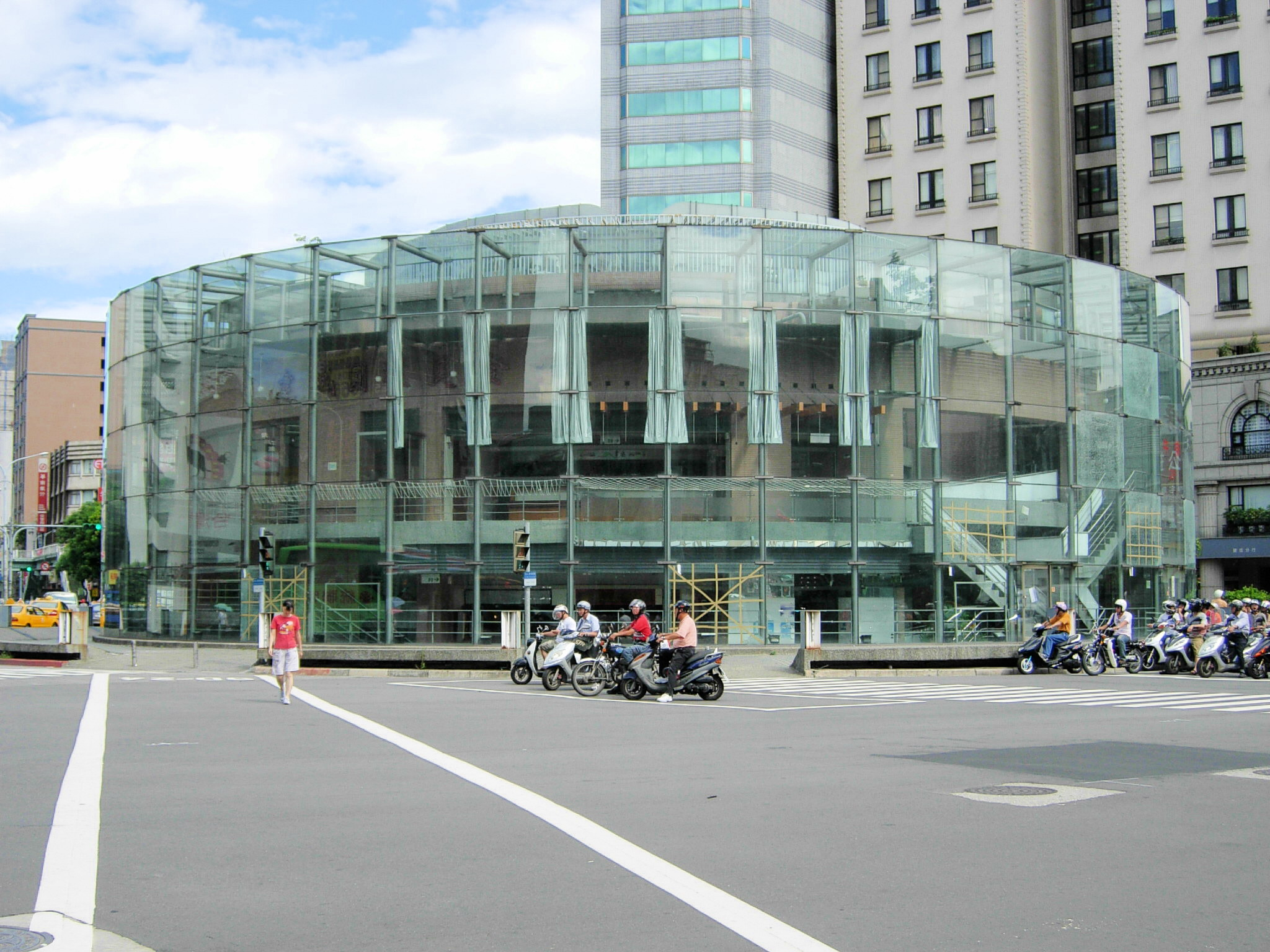
The glass structure at the Chien-Cheng Circle from 2001 to 2016

The new Chien-Cheng Circle was opened in the evening of 4 October 2003, housing 20 food booths and a performing arts center at the top of the building. To promote the opening, the city government gave away 700 food-tasting coupons worth NT$100 each and organized a tour led by Chuang Yung-ming (莊永明), vice-chairman of the municipal research department and professor at the Taipei Medical University. Although the new building was intended to revitalize the market, food vendors had complained that the modern building did not reflect the market's history and lacked a traditional, cultural feeling. They also said that a lack of promotion and assistance from the city government had hurt business.

=== Closing ===
Taipei City Councilwoman Chen Yu-mei held a press conference on Thursday (29 June 2006) to announce the closure and called residents to visit the facility before the official closing on Sunday. The Chien-Cheng Circle had been in decline since its reopening in 2003 and prior to its closing all the stalls on the second floor and five stalls on the first floor had closed with only six stalls on the first floor still in operation. The Taipei City Markets Administration Office in a written statement on 1 July 2006 stated that the renovation project had failed to regain its competitiveness due to the building's design and also problems with vendors. It has given each vendor a sum of NT$800,000 in relocation subsidies.

=== Planned reopening ===
In 2008, the Taipei City Government announced that the Chien-Cheng Circle is undergoing a replanning. It was scheduled to reopen in June 2009. However, as of summer 2010 the structure remains derelict and some have postulated the Circle may not return to its former commercial prosperity. In May 2011, the reopening of the Circle was once again postponed due to disputes on lease. Older tenants of the Taipei Circle have blamed the government of the then mayor Ma Ying-jeou for causing the demise of business at the circle.

=== Public plaza ===
In 2016, the glass building at the Chien-Cheng Circle was slated for demolition with plans to begin on November 26, 2016, and completed in March 2017. The public plaza, with green space and fountain was completed in July 2017.
