= Yuda International Trade Center =

Skyscraper in Zhengzhou, Henan, China

- 裕达国际贸易中心
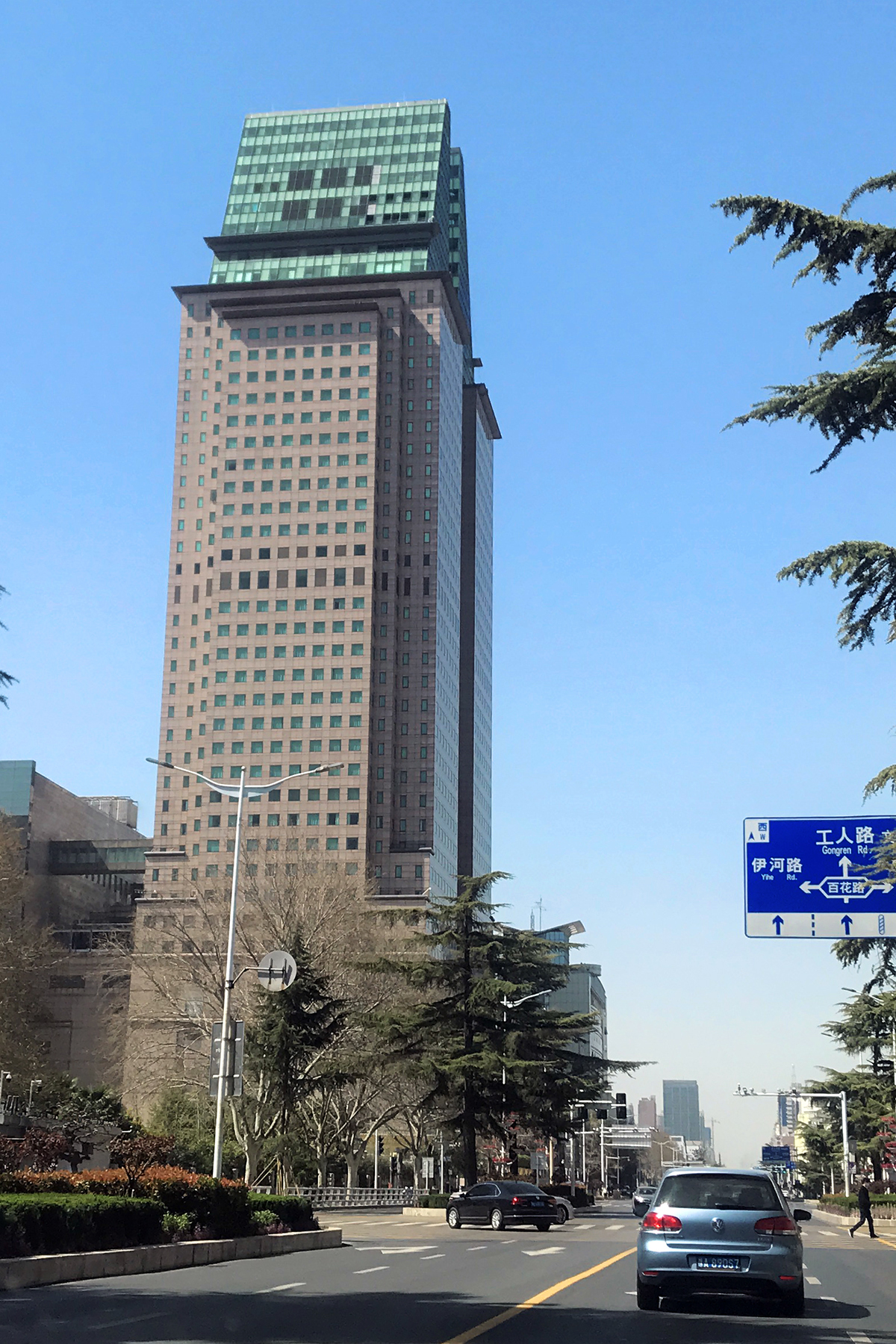
- Interactive map of the Yuda International Trade Center area

General information
- Status: Completed
- Location: 220 Zhongyuan M. Road, Zhongyuan District, Zhengzhou, Henan, China
- Coordinates: 34°44′53″N 113°37′1″E
- Construction started: 1995
- Completed: 1998
- Opened: 1998

Height
- Architectural: 199.7 metres (655.2 ft)
- Antenna spire: 199.7 metres (655.2 ft)
- Roof: 185 metres (607.0 ft)
- Top floor: 45

Design and construction
- Architect: C. Y. Lee & Partners

Yuda International Trade Center is a skyscraper in Zhengzhou, Henan, People's Republic of China.

With a height of 199.7 metres (655.2 ft), the building used to be the tallest skyscraper in Zhengzhou and Henan from 1998 to 2012, until the opening of the 280-metre (918.6 ft) high Zhengzhou Greenland Plaza.

== See also ==
- List of tallest buildings in China
