= Nangang Software Park =

Area of Taipei, Taiwan

Coordinates: 25°3′27.1″N 121°36′52″E

The Nangang Software Park (NKSP; Chinese: 南港軟體產業園區; pinyin: Nángǎng Ruǎntǐ Chǎnyè Yuánqū) is located in the 87-hectare Nangang Trade and Economic Park, Taipei, Taiwan. It is also known as Nangang Software Industrial Park (Chinese: 南港軟體工業園), Nangang Industrial Park (Chinese: 南港工業園), and Nangang Science Park (Chinese: 南港科學園).

== Location ==
The Nangang Software Park is located Nangang District, Taipei. The park is accessible by three highways, one expressway, two metro lines, the railway, bullet train, and more than 30 public bus lines. There are several restaurants and public art works located in the park. The park is open to the public, but access badges are required for the office floors.

== Overview ==
The Ministry of Economic Affairs initiated the Nangang Software Park project in 1991 and initially planned to break ground in December 1993. The project encountered repeated setbacks caused by disputes over rent pricing, investment returns, and land leasing, making the start date for construction uncertain. Lien Chan, Taiwan's premier, led the groundbreaking ceremony for the project in May 1994 which was billed as Asia–Pacific's largest software industrial park once completed.

NKSP was designed by the Industrial Development Bureau (IDB), a division of Taiwan's Ministry of Economic Affairs, and Century Development Corporation. The Software Park was developed three phases. Phase I of the Software Park was completed in October 1999. Phase I consists of five connected buildings with 187,334 m2 of floor space on 3.97 hectares of land. IBM, TECO, Tradevan, NXP, and YAO5DX are a few of the 107 companies located in Phase I. Phase II was completed in September 2003 with 252,525 m2 of floor space on 4.18 hectares of land. Siemens Medical, HSBC, Sony, AMD, and two Biotech Incubator Facilities are located in Phase II. Phase III was completed in August 2008, and has 171,500 m2 of floor space on 1.52 hectares of land. This Phase is home to one of the Asian Headquarters for Hewlett-Packard, Yahoo, the Microsoft Innovation Center, Alcor Semiconductor, TDK-Epcos, Freescale Semiconductor, IBM, Intel, ASE (USI), A10 Networks,KKBOX, NEC, Philips, Philips, Titansoft and several other technology firms.

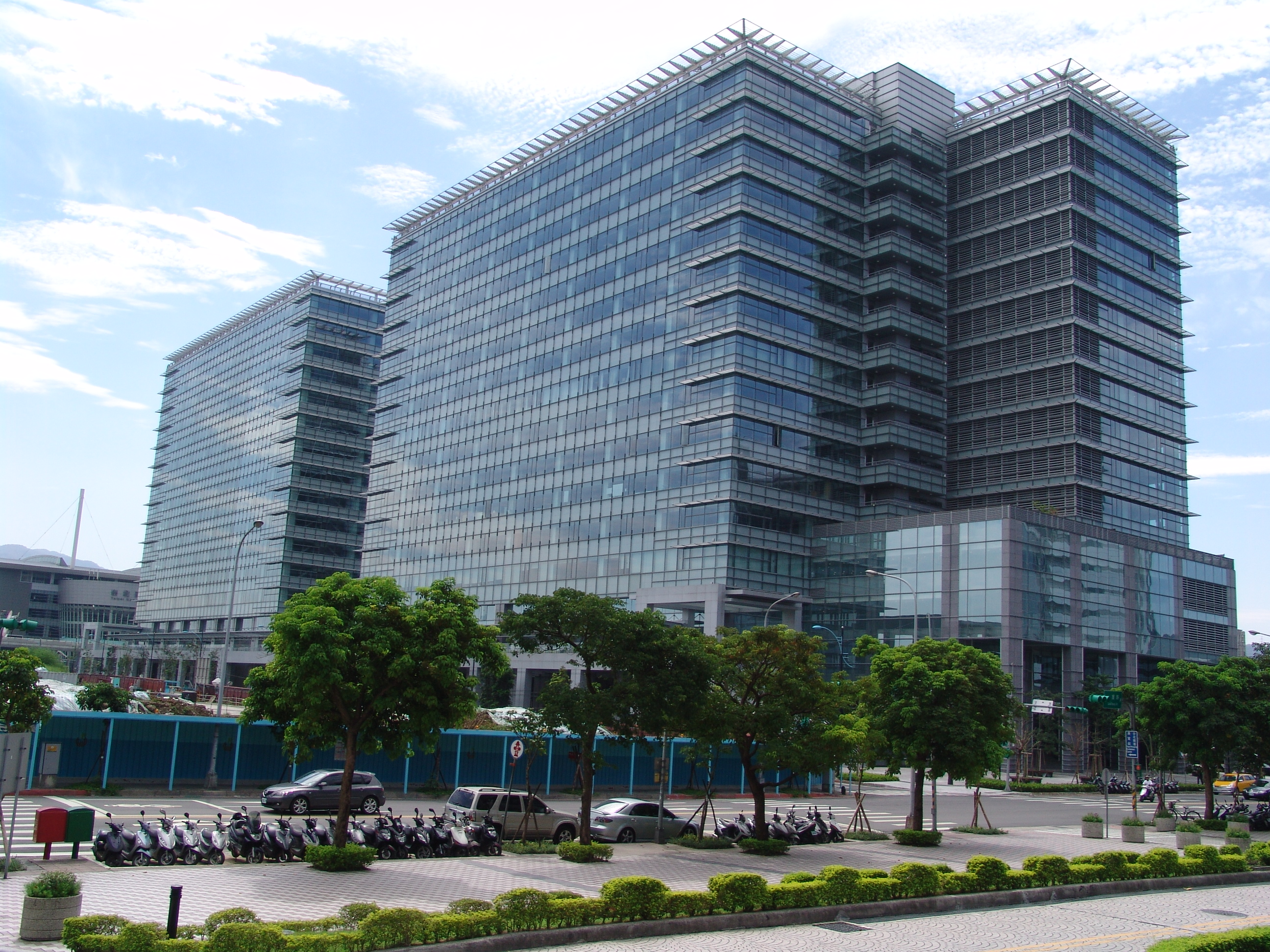
Nankang Software Park, Phase III

== Distinctions ==
Wired Magazine profiled the Nangang Software Park in 2000, when it named Taipei City the Number 1 Digital City in Asia (No. 8 in the World). In the article, it sited NKSP as one of the primary reasons for Taipei City's strong rating. The Software Park has also been profiled in Harvard Business Review, Scientific American, and Business Today (Taiwan). In 2005, the Nangang Software Park was named one of the three Intelligent Buildings of the Year by the Intelligence Community Forum (New York, NY, USA). In 2008, the Economist Intelligent Unit ranked the Nangang Software Park as the top rated software park across four categories among a select group of Asian Software Parks. NKSP is highly regarded for the annual production it adds to the economy each year, the strength of the companies in its incubator centers, and the mixture of local and international clients. In 2007, the park contributed around US$6 billion in production annually and employed approximately 14,000 people. It is estimated that with the inclusion of Phase III the Park's production will increase to approximately US$28 billion and employ over 28,000 technology workers.

The Nangang Software Park, Neihu Technology Park, and the Hsinchu Science Park are often credited for being the catalyst in the development of Taiwan's high tech industries and the dramatic increase in Taiwan's share of intellectual property. The Nangang Software Park, Neihu Technology Park, and greater Xizhi Economic and Trade Park also create the Taipei tech triangle as they house many of Taiwan's top tech corporate headquarters.

== Difficulties and challenges ==
The Nari Typhoon brought flooding to large portions of Taipei City including the Nangang Software Park in 2001. During that flood, some of the electrical systems in the basement of the Software Park were damaged. The Taipei City Government has built a large pumping station along the Jilong River to reduce the risk of flooding. Phase I was retrofitted with flood gates to help reduce the risk of future flooding. In addition, new sections of the park have been designed with protection above the 200-year flood line.

== How to Get There ==
Public Transportation: To arrive at the Nangang Software Park take Bannan line to Nangang Exhibition Center Station and transfer to Wenhu line, the second stop will be Nangang Software Park Station.

== See also ==
- Economy of Taiwan
- Beitou-Shilin Technology Park
- Kaohsiung Software Park
