= 85 Sky Tower =

Skyscraper in Lingya, Kaohsiung, Taiwan

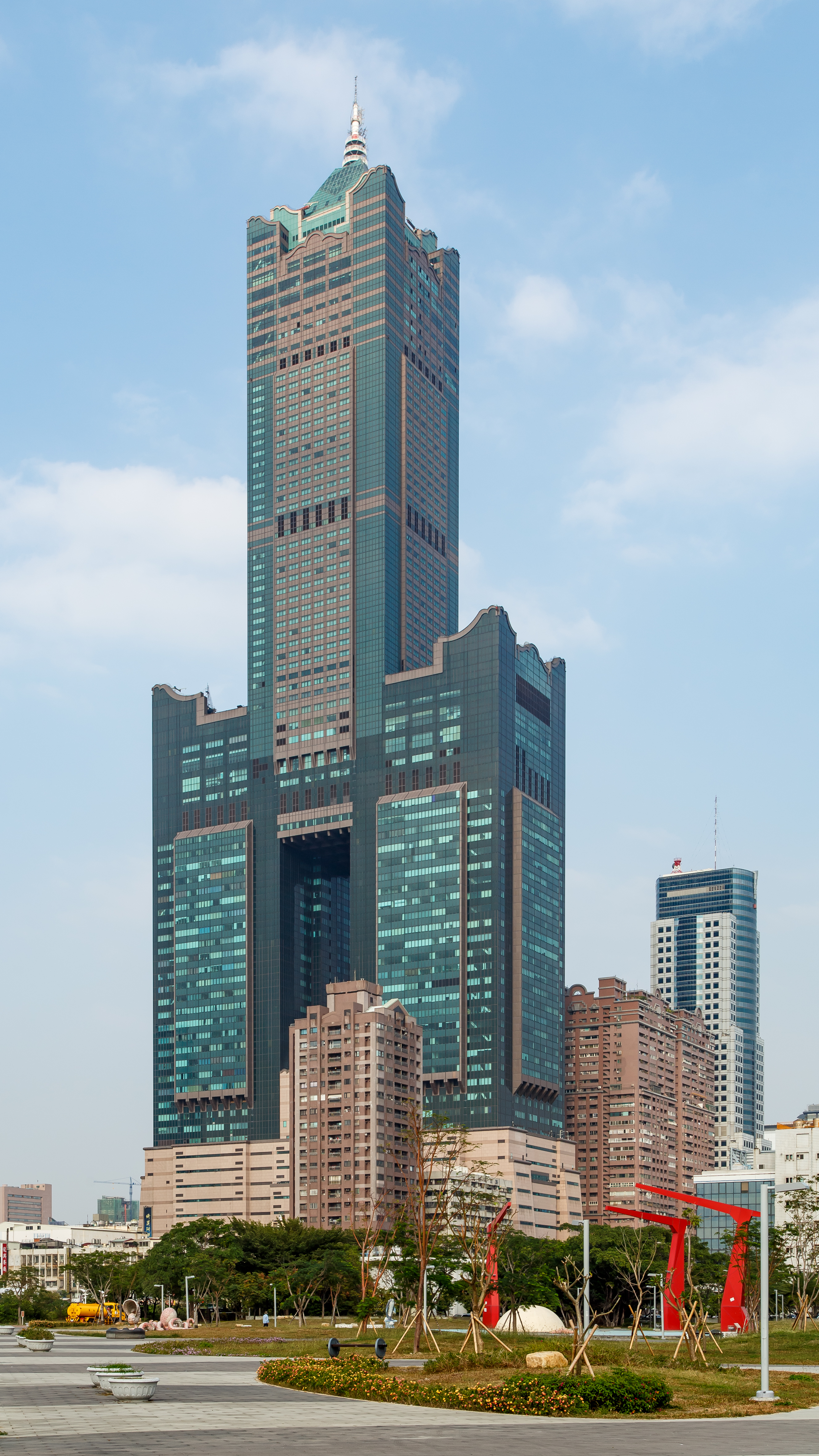
- Interactive map of the 85 Sky Tower area

General information
- Status: Completed
- Type: Mixed Use (Office building, Hotel, Shopping mall)
- Location: Lingya, Kaohsiung, Taiwan
- Coordinates: 22°36′42″N 120°18′00″E
- Construction started: 1994
- Completed: 1997
- Cost: NT$ 5 billion

Height
- Architectural: 347.5 m (1,140 ft)
- Tip: 378.0 m (1,240 ft)
- Antenna spire: 378.0 m (1,240 ft)
- Roof: 347.5 m (1,140 ft)
- Top floor: 341.0 m (1,119 ft)
- Observatory: 341.0 m (1,119 ft)

Technical details
- Floor count: 85 (+5 basement floors)
- Floor area: 306,337 m^{2} (3,297,384 sq ft)
- Lifts/elevators: 54

Design and construction
- Architect: C.Y. Lee
- Structural engineer: Evergreen Consulting Engineering

85 Sky Tower (Chinese: 高雄85大樓; pinyin: Gāoxióng 85 Dàlóu; Pe̍h-ōe-jī: Ko-hiông 85 Tōa-lâu), formerly known as the T & C Tower or Tuntex Sky Tower, is an 85-story skyscraper in Lingya District, Kaohsiung, Taiwan. The structure is 347.5 m (1,140 ft) high. An antenna increases the pinnacle height to 378 m (1,240 ft). Constructed from 1994 to 1997 by the now-defunct Tuntex Group, it is the tallest building in Kaohsiung, and the 2nd tallest in Taiwan after the Taipei 101.

As of 2023, the building is almost entirely unoccupied except for a few condominiums (some subleased as short-term rentals) and offices from the 12th to 35th floors. Many floors have not been used in decades, and their conditions have become dirty and run-down. When the building first opened, it once housed a department store, indoor amusement park, five-star hotel, observatory, steakhouse and disco, VIP club and spa, and other amenities.

The building was designed by C.Y. Lee & Partners and Hellmuth, Obata & Kassabaum, and has an unusual 'prong' design with two separate 39-floor sections, which merge into a single central tower rising to a spire. This unique design leaves a substantial space below the central part of the tower. The design was inspired by the Chinese character Gāo (高), which means "tall" and is part of the city's Chinese name. John W. Milton was Project Director on behalf of Turner International Inc. (New York), a subsidiary of Turner Construction.

There is no 44th floor in the building due to tetraphobia, so the 43rd floor connects directly to the 45th floor; the 57th floor, a mechanical floor, is numbered 57A. The pyramid shaped crown is the equivalent of three stories high and is hence marketed as 83–85 to arrive at a round number. There is no elevator access to floors above 80.

== Occupancy ==
Floor 34 and 35 are currently leased by Look Hotel Group (Chinese: 樂活商旅租). The 85 Sky Tower Hotel (ceased operations) (Chinese: 君鴻國際酒店) occupied floors 37 to 85, and it owned the observation deck. Office space and studio apartments occupy each side of the lower floors.

== Atrium ==
There is an atrium that extends from Level 45's Shimmer Ballroom (as of 2015 the entire floor is dark and unoccupied) to Level 83; it is one of the highest continuous atriums in the world.

== Floor directory ==
- 83–85: Mechanical
- 81: Radio Broadcasting Facility
- 77–79: Palace VIP Private Club and Spa (ceased operations)
- 76: Sexy Disco Bar (ceased operations)
- 75: Teppanyaki restaurant (ceased operations)
- 74: Observatory (ceased operations)
- 71–73: unoccupied
- 46–70: Guest Rooms (ceased operations)
- 43–45: Meeting Rooms and Ballrooms (no 44th floor) (ceased operations)
- 38–42: Hotel Facilities (ceased operations)
- 36–37: Mechanical, Electrical, and Plumbing (M/E/P)
- 13–35: Offices and Residential condominiums (School of Banking and Finance, NSYSU)
- 12: Nikko Plaza (sky lobby for offices and condominiums)
- 8–11: Chien-Tai Indoor Amusement Park (ceased operations)
- B1, 2–7: Chien-Tai Daimaru Department Store (ceased operations)
- 1: Lobby
- B5–B3: Parking garage

== Transportation ==
The building is accessible within five blocks' walking distance west of Sanduo Shopping District Station of the Kaohsiung MRT, and within two blocks' walking distance east of the Kaohsiung Exhibition Center light rail station.

== See also ==
- List of tallest buildings in Taiwan
- List of tallest buildings in Kaohsiung
- List of tallest buildings
- List of tallest freestanding structures in the world
- List of tallest freestanding steel structures

== Gallery ==
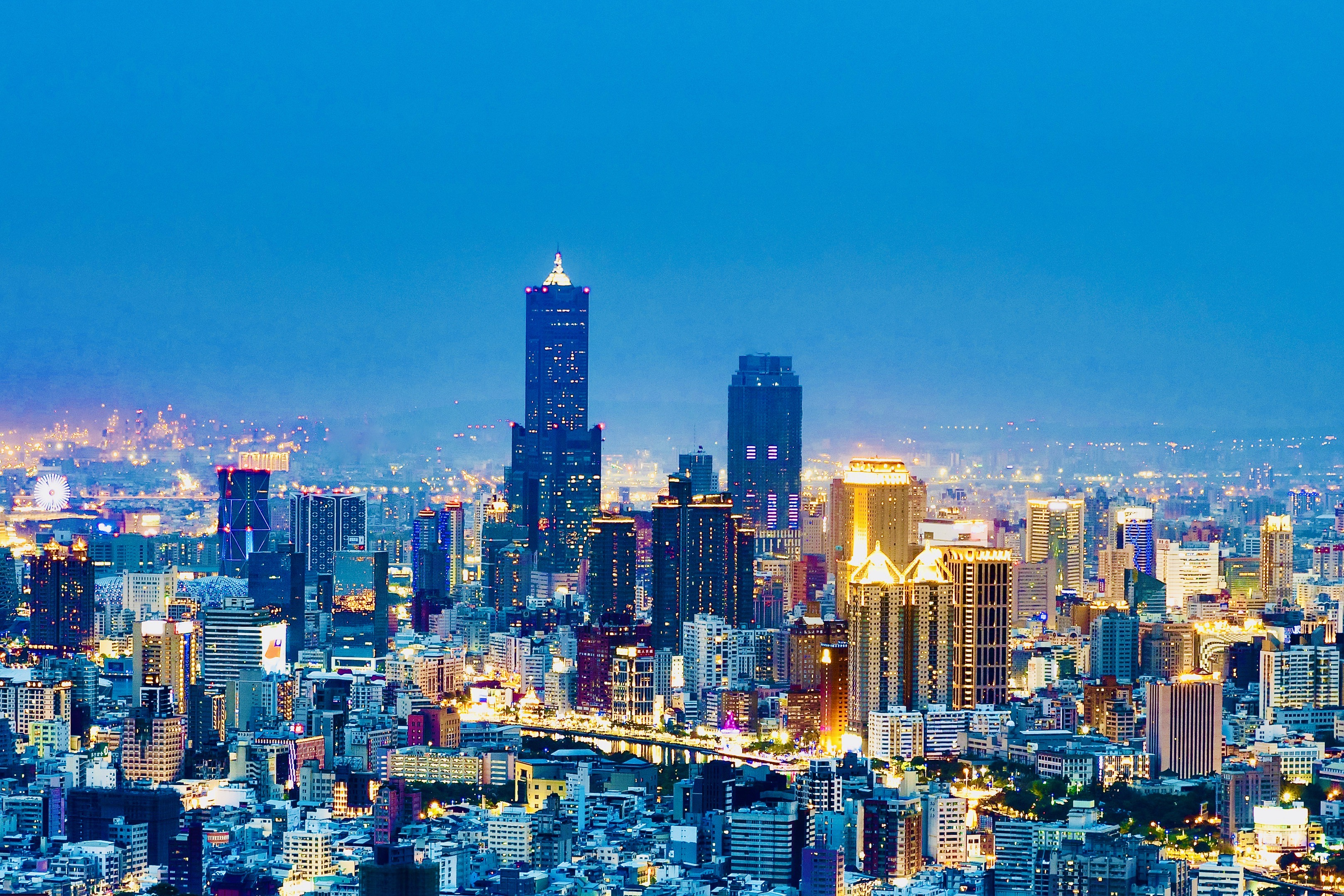
85 Sky Tower viewed at night

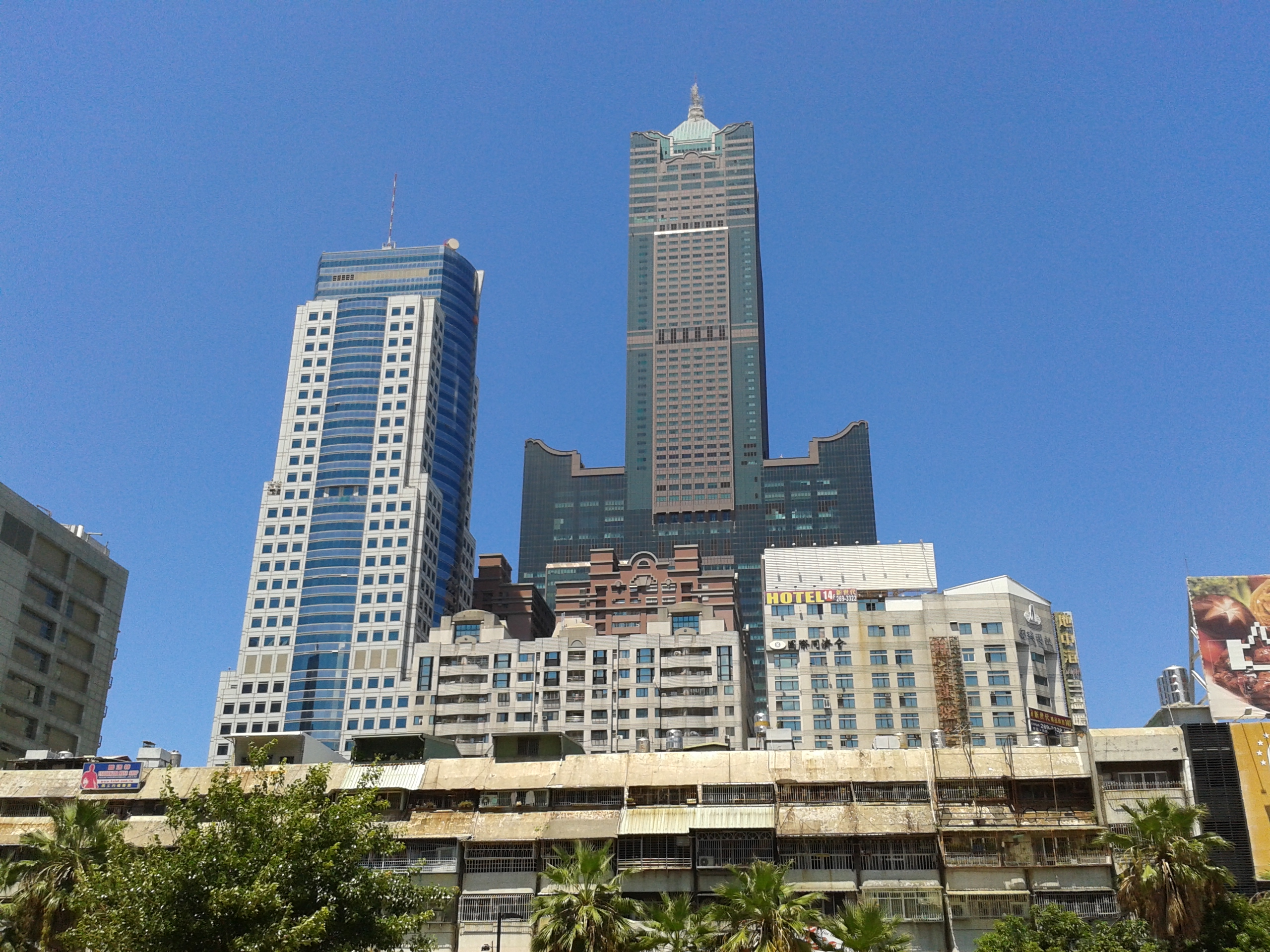
85 Sky Tower dominating Kaohsiung's skyline

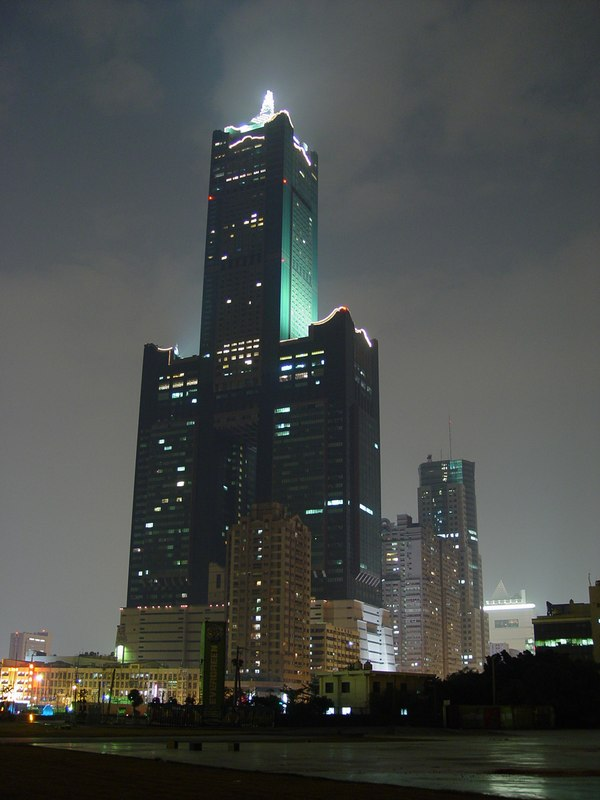
85 Sky Tower illuminated at night

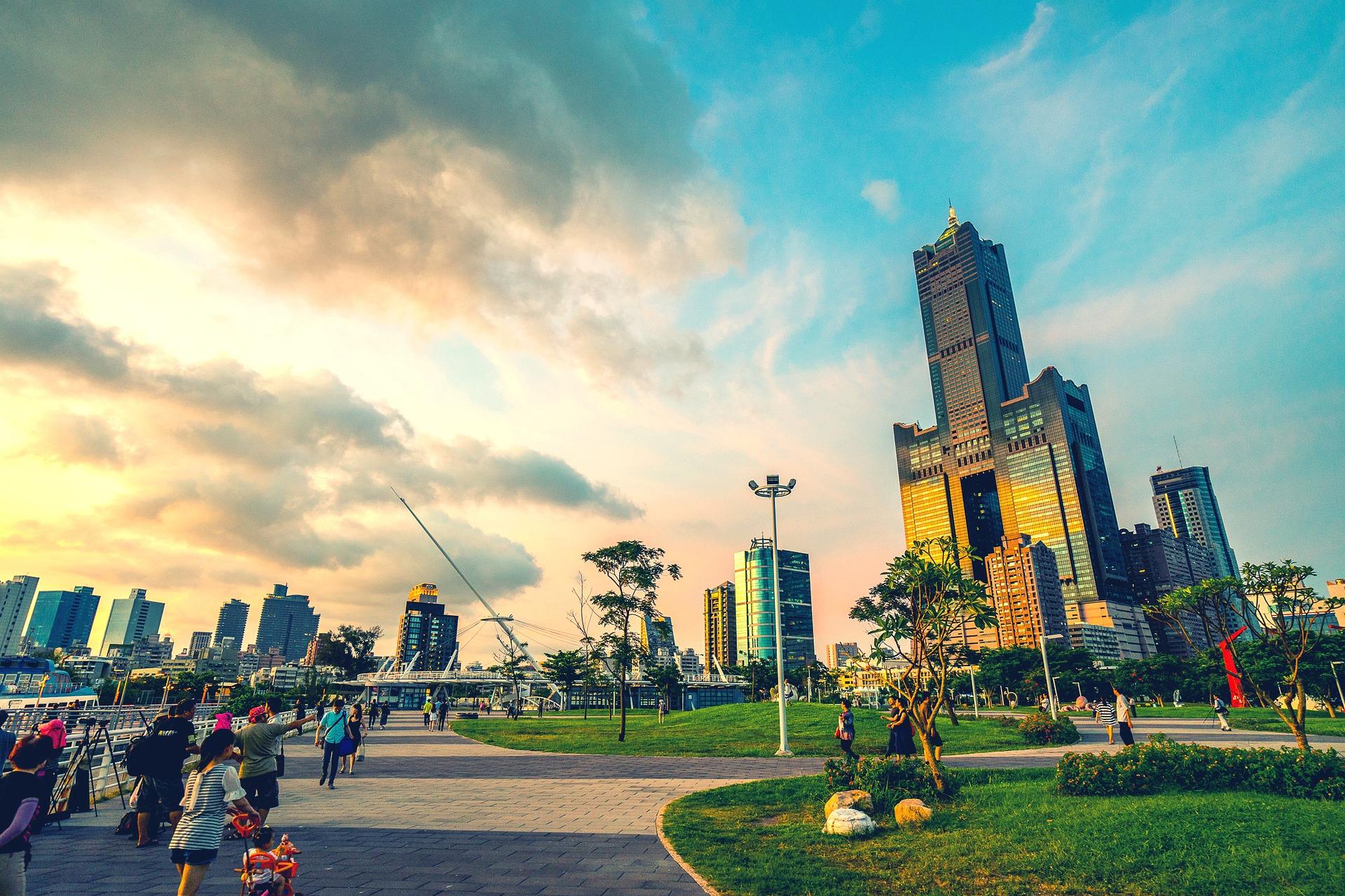
85 Sky Tower at sunset

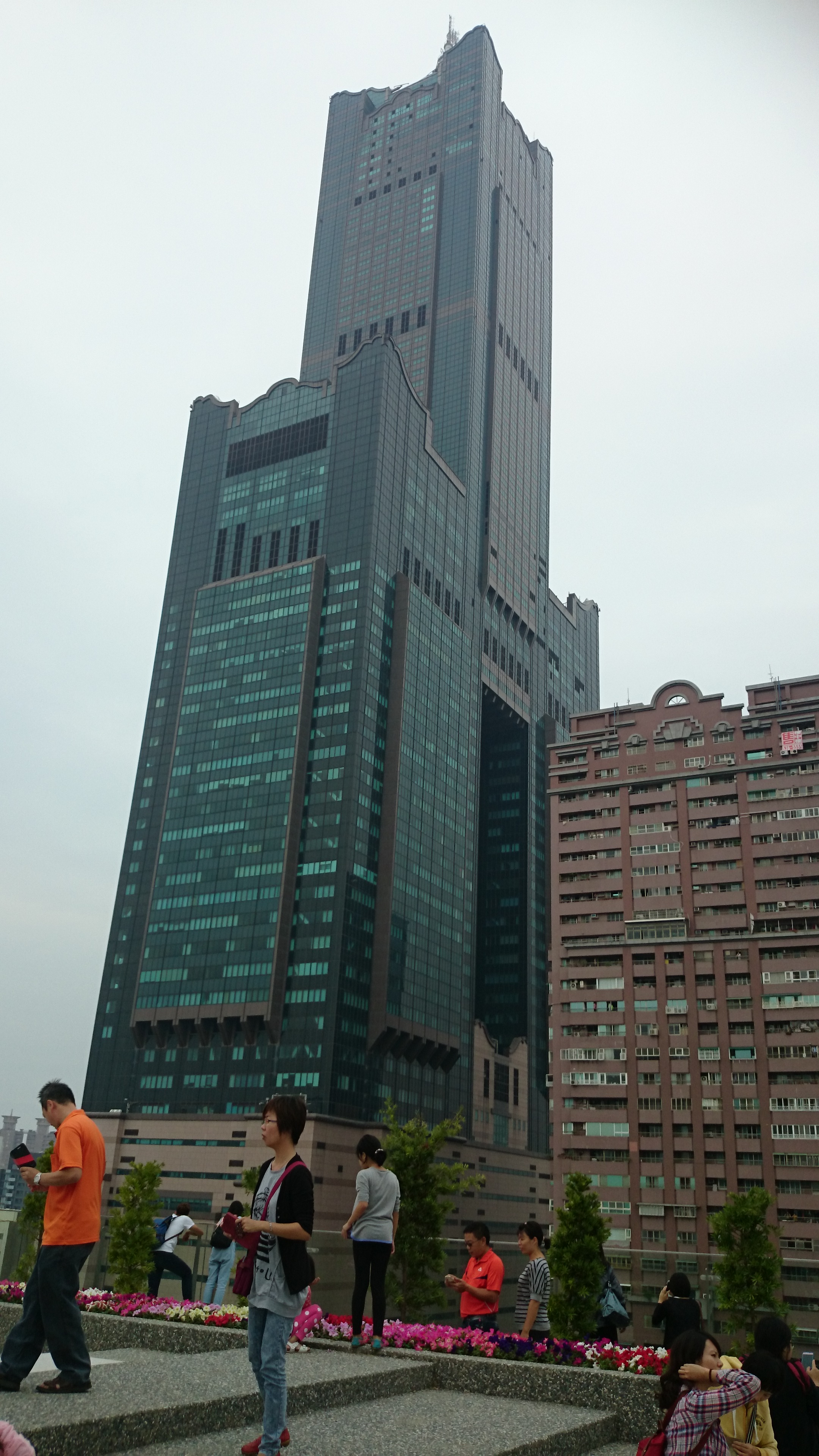
85 Sky Tower viewed from below

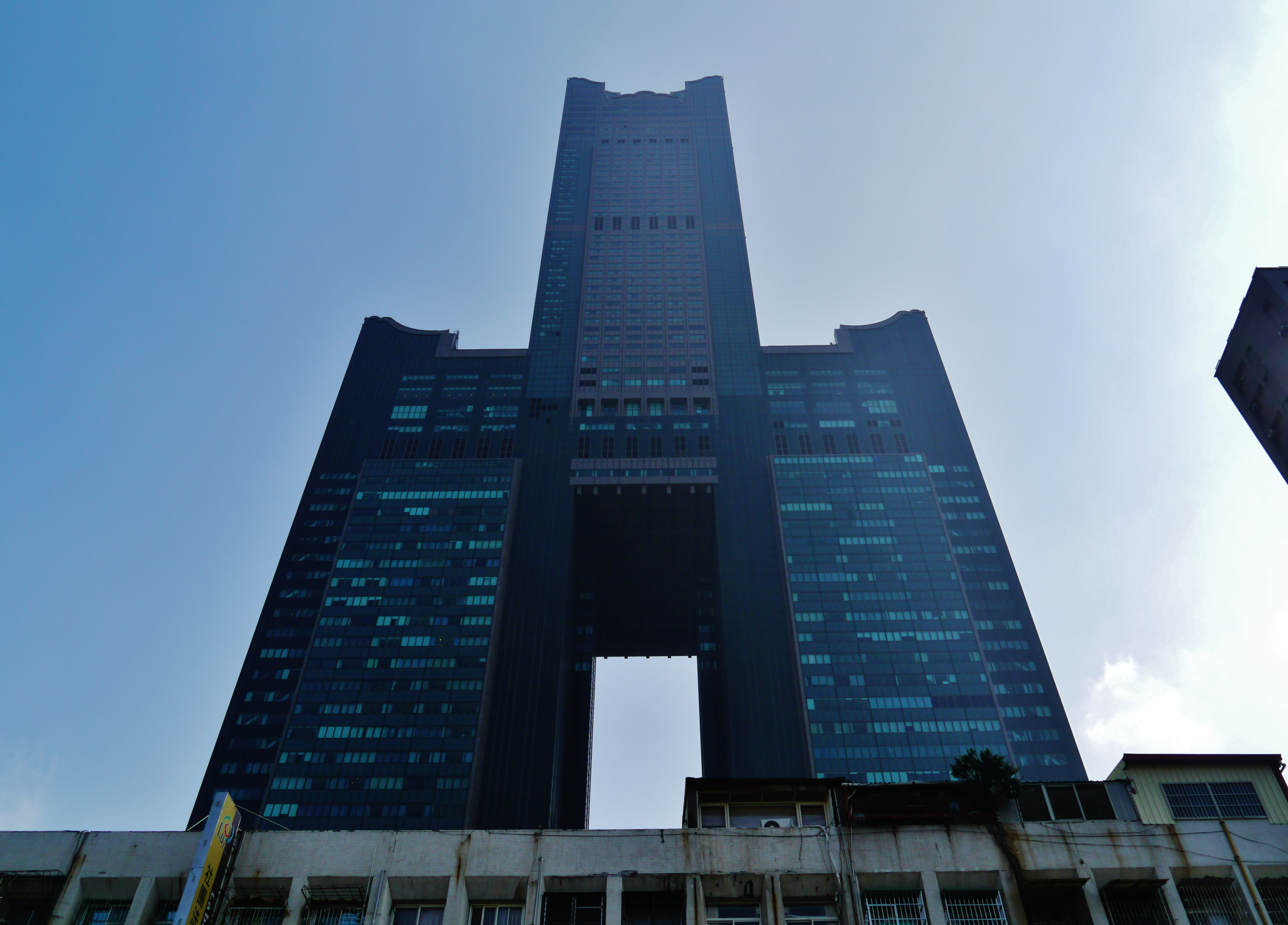
85 Sky Tower viewed from below

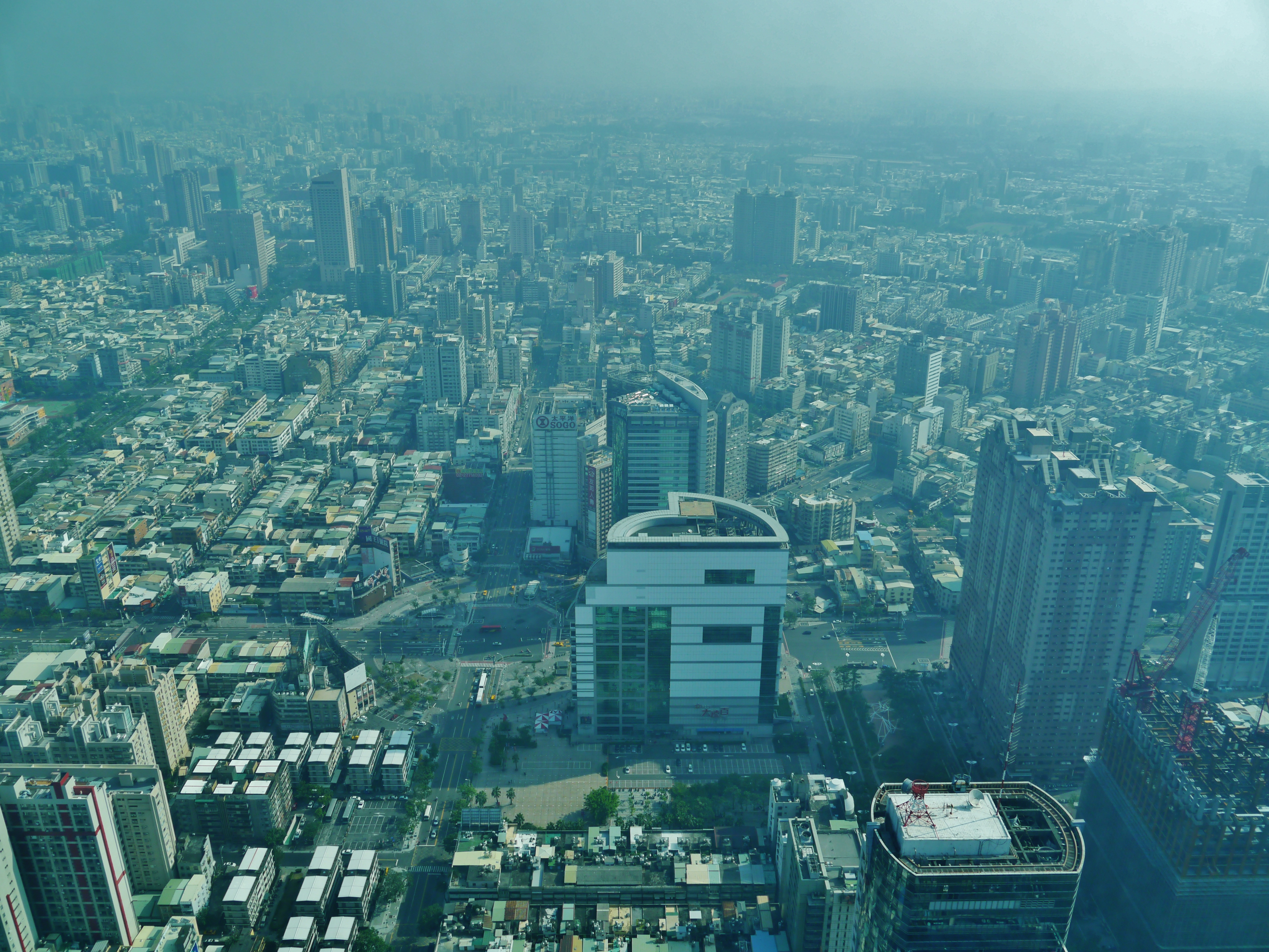
View of Kaohsiung's streets from 85 Sky Tower's observation deck

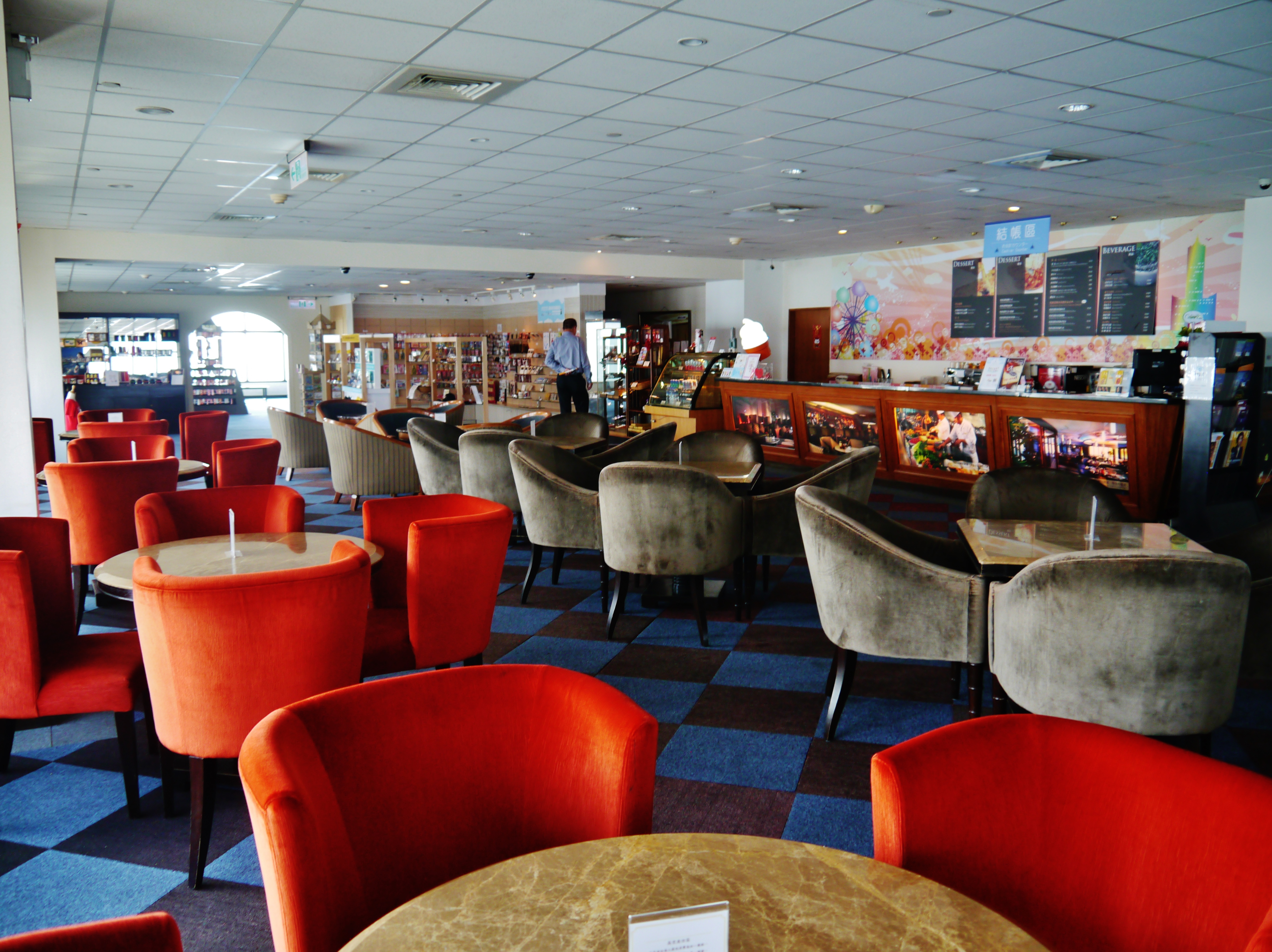
85 Sky Tower Observation Deck (ceased operations)

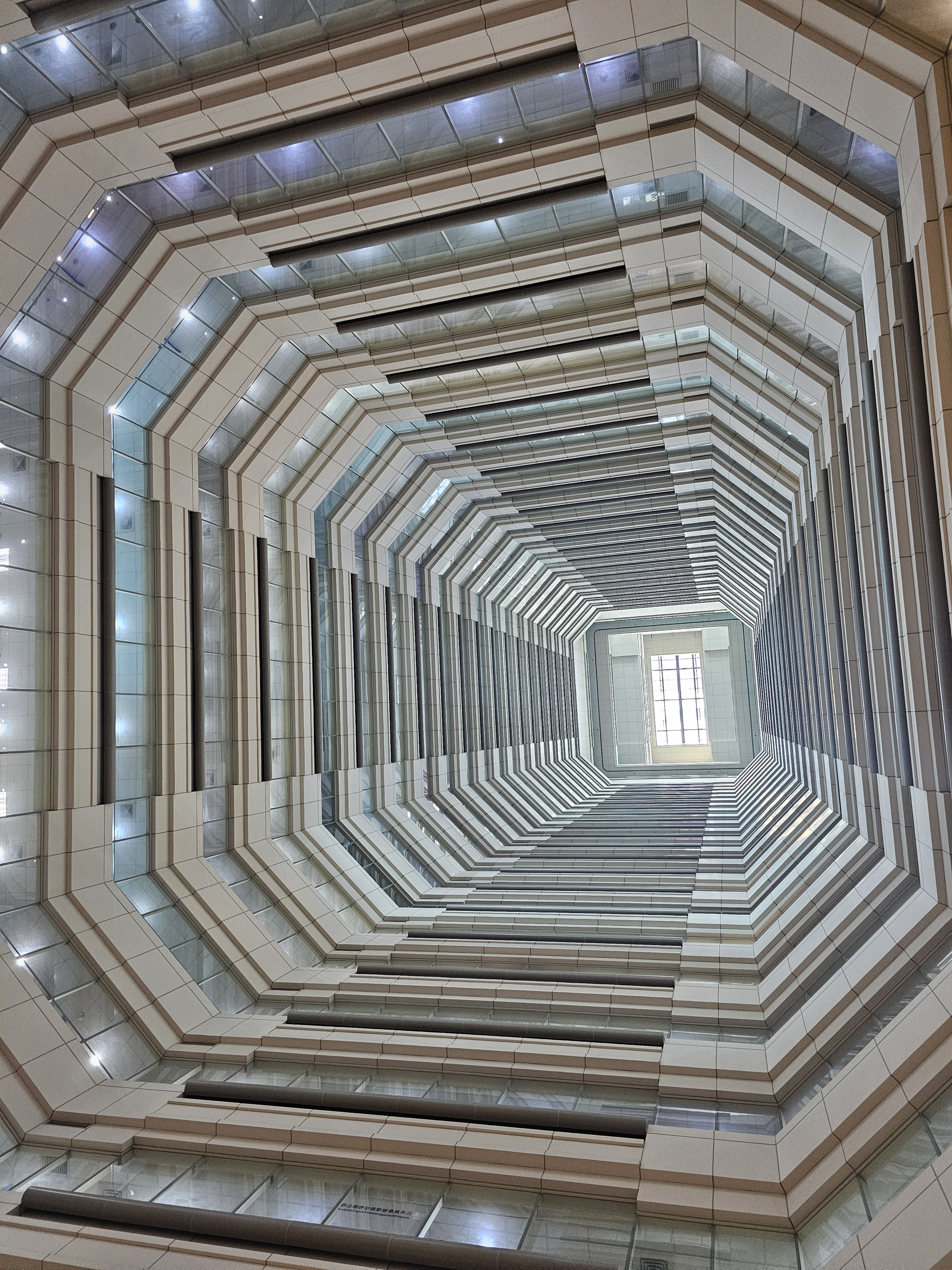
Interior atrium of 85 Sky Tower, one of the highest continuous atriums in the world, looking up toward the skylight

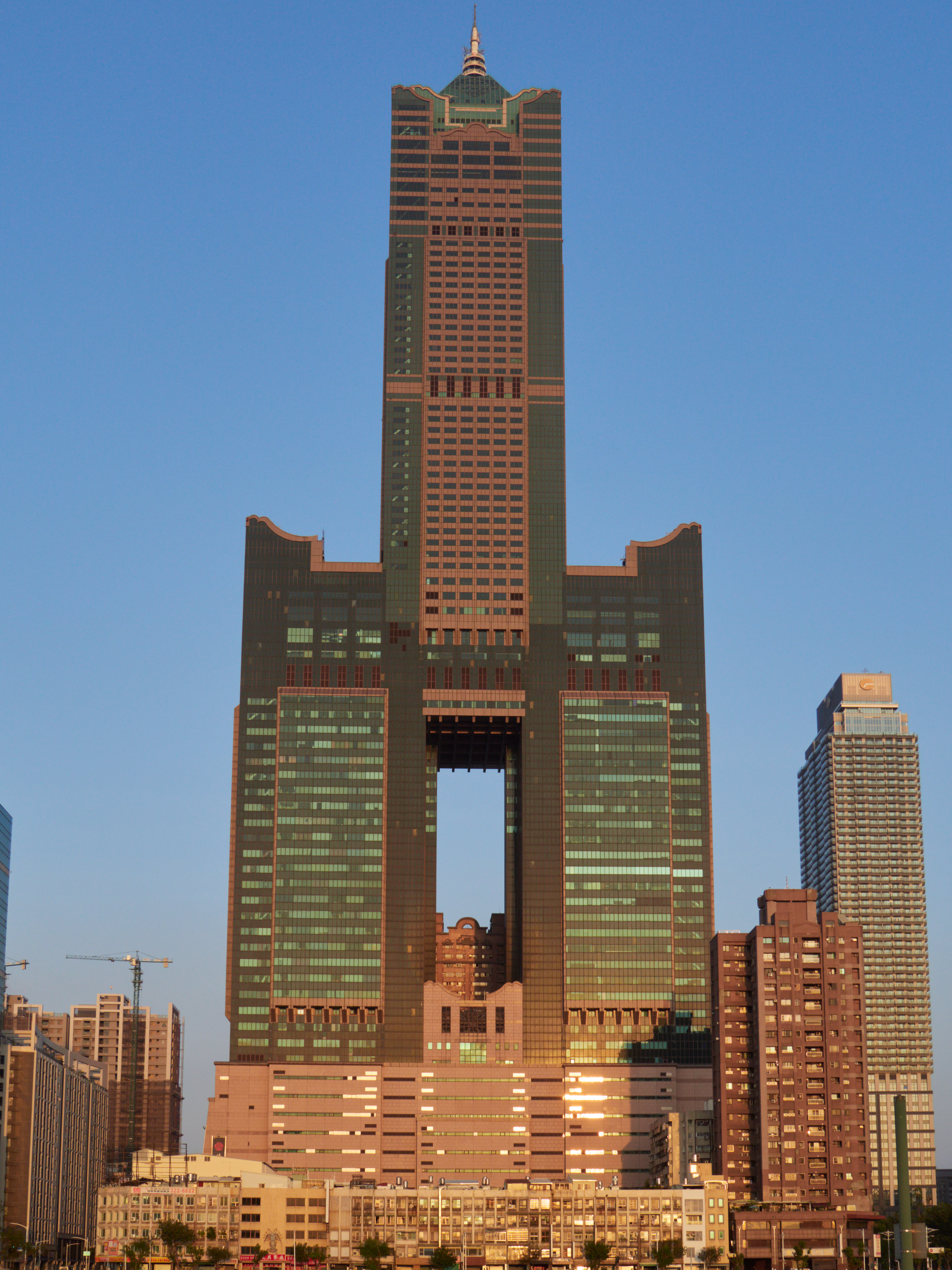
Forward facing view

Preceded by Shin Kong Life Tower	Tallest building in Taiwan; 1997 – 2004	Succeeded by Taipei 101
