= Shangri-La's Far Eastern Plaza Hotel Tainan =

Skyscraper hotel in East District, Tainan, Taiwan

Shangri-La's Far Eastern Plaza Hotel Tainan 香格里拉台南遠東國際大飯店
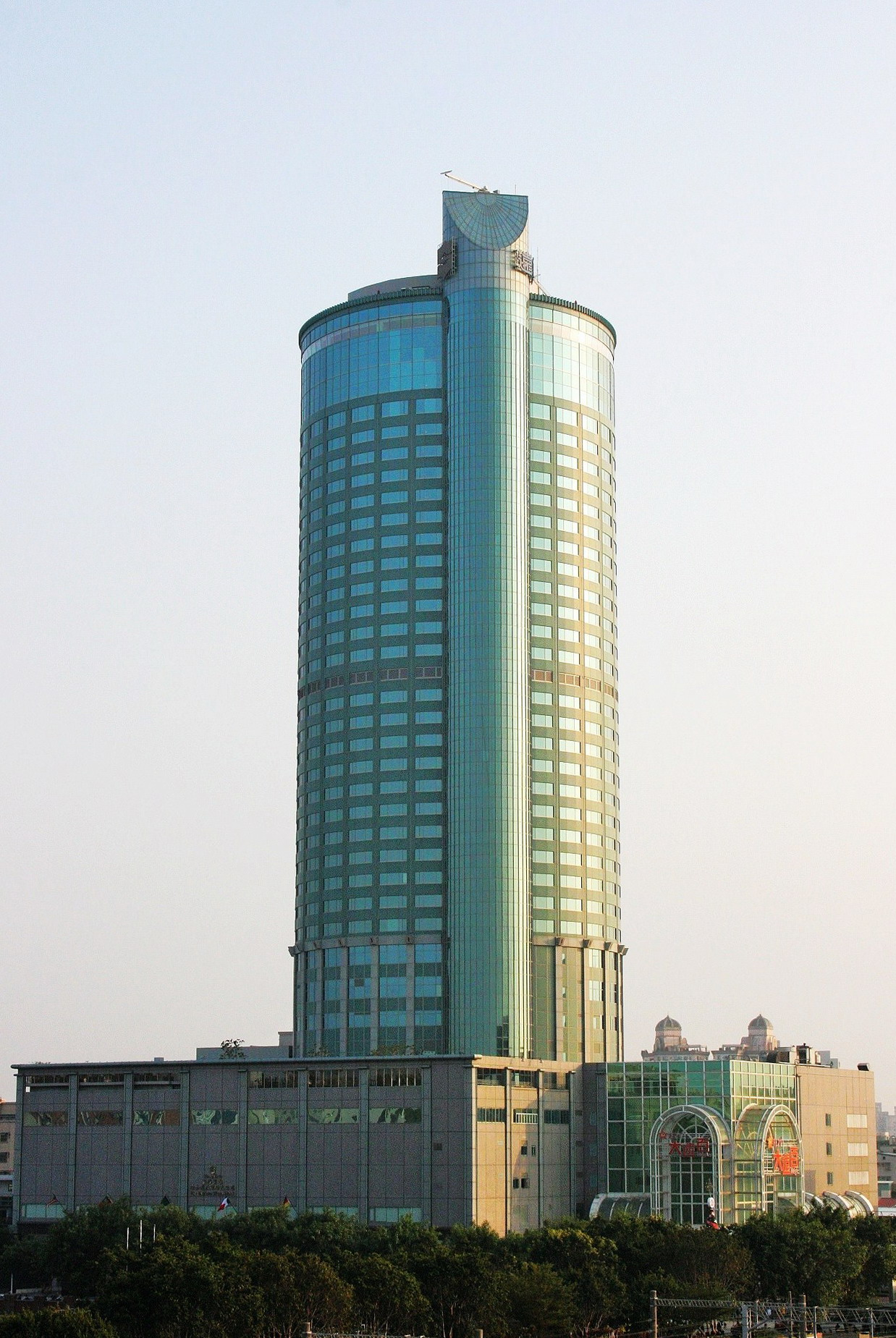
- Interactive map of the Shangri-La's Far Eastern Plaza Hotel Tainan 香格里拉台南遠東國際大飯店 area

General information
- Type: Hotel
- Location: East District, Tainan, Taiwan
- Coordinates: 22°59′48″N 120°12′51″E
- Completed: 1993

Height
- Architectural: 140 m (460 ft)
- Tip: 153 m (502 ft)

Technical details
- Floor count: 38

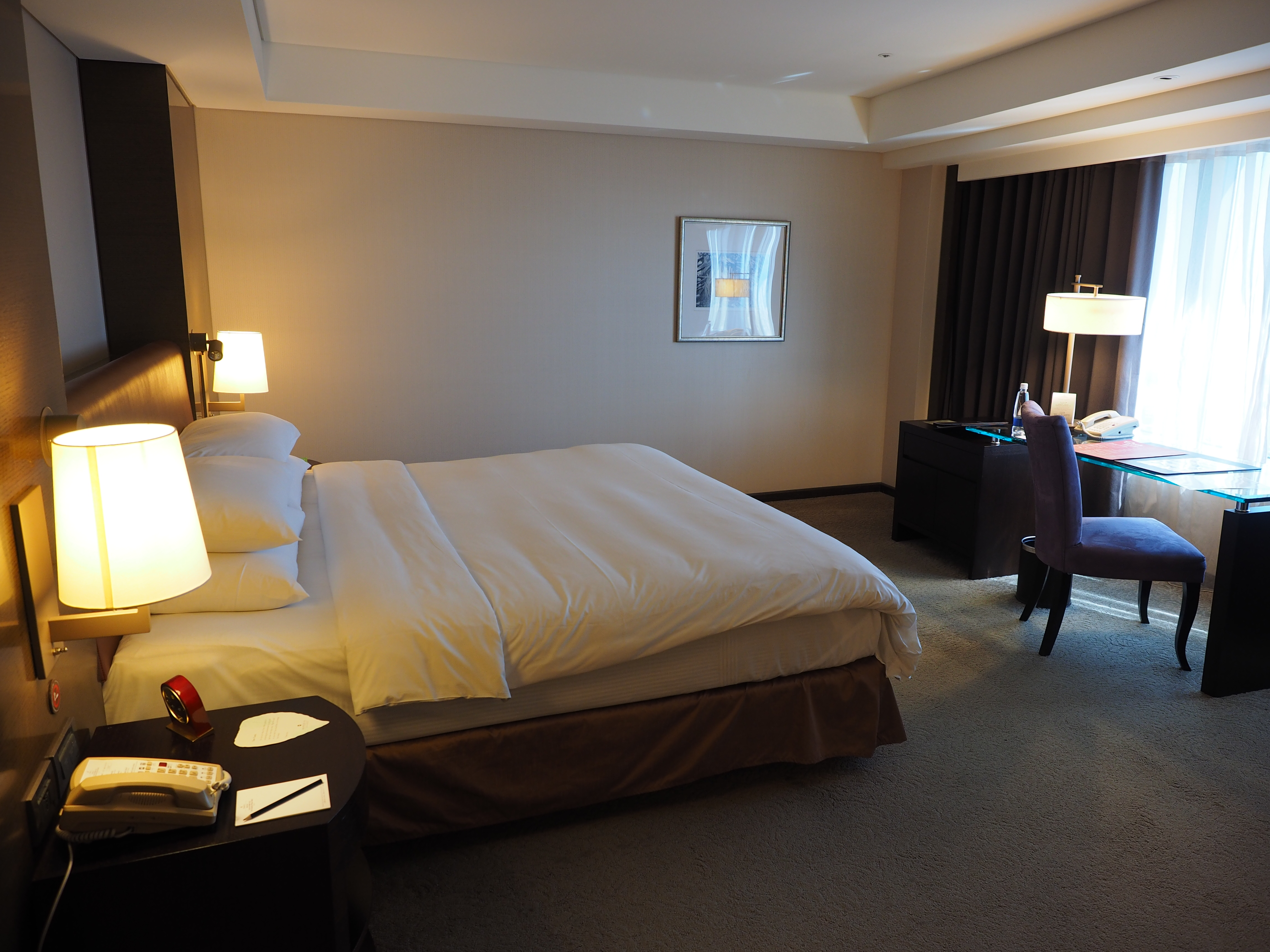
A room in the hotel

The Shangri-La's Far Eastern Plaza Hotel Tainan (Chinese: 香格里拉台南遠東國際大飯店; pinyin: Xiānggélǐlā táinán yuǎndōng guójì dà fàndiàn), is skyscraper hotel completed in 1993 in East District, Tainan, Taiwan. It is one of the earliest skyscrapers in Tainan and as of December 2020, it is still the tallest building in the city. The architectural height of the building is 140 m (460 ft) with its antenna reaching 153 m (502 ft), and it comprises 38 floors above ground, as well as six basement levels, with a floor area of around 70,000 m^{2} (750,000 sq ft).

The lower floors of the building houses the Far Eastern Department Store and the upper floors houses a hotel, which is managed by the Shangri-La Hotels and Resorts. The hotel has a total of 331 rooms and 5 restaurants and bars and is one of the top luxury hotels in Tainan. This is Shangri-La's one of two bases in Taiwan, with the other base being located in Far Eastern Plaza in Taipei.

== See also ==
- Shangri-La Far Eastern, Taipei
- List of tallest buildings in Asia
- List of tallest buildings in Taiwan
- List of tallest buildings in Tainan
- Unique Golden Triangle
