= List of tallest buildings in Tainan =

Skyline of Tainan 台南天際線
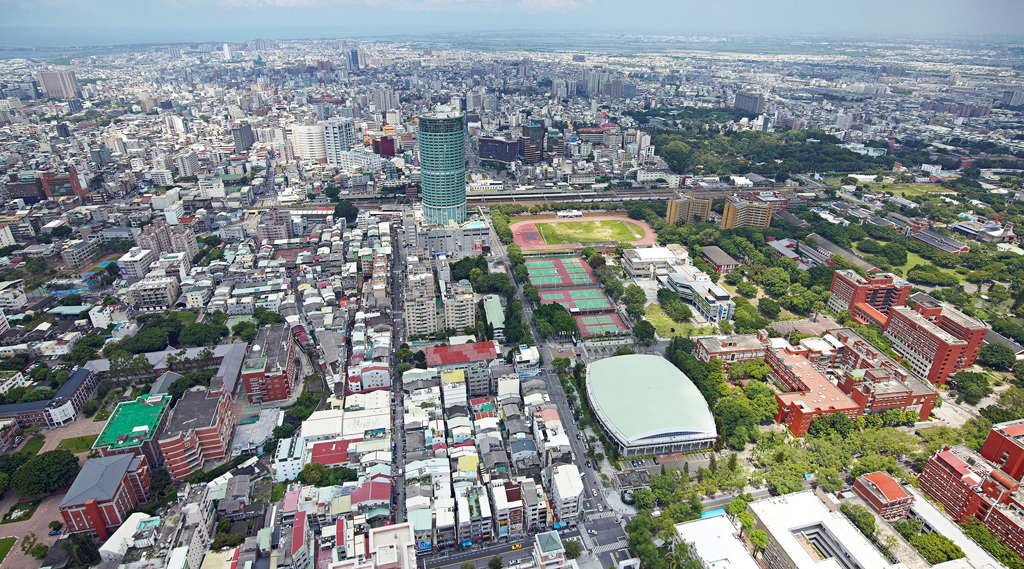
- An aerial view of Tainan in 2012
- Tallest building: Shangri-La's Far Eastern Plaza Hotel Tainan (1993)
- Tallest building height: 140 m (459 ft)

Number of tall buildings (2026)
- Taller than 100 m (328 ft): 13

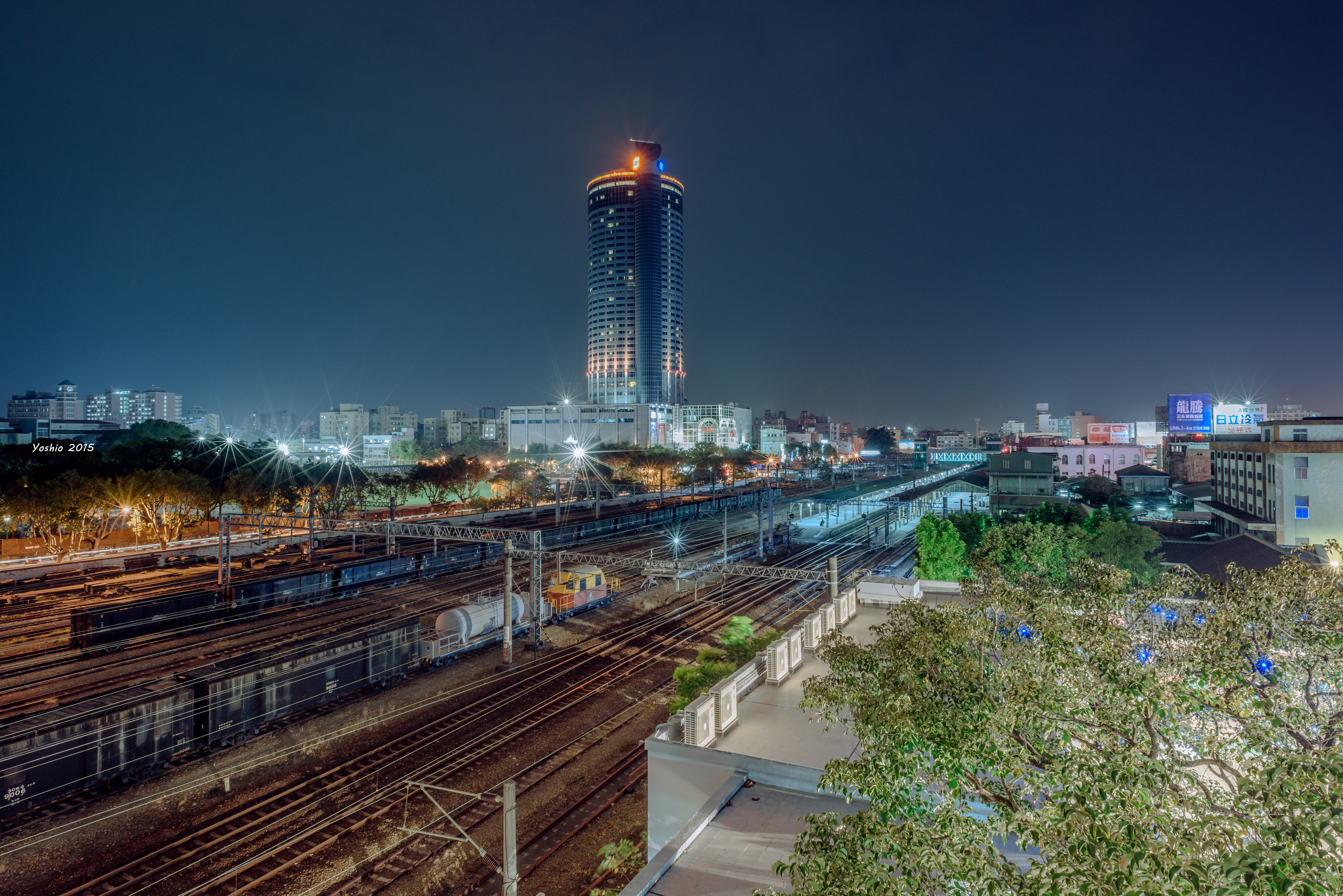
Tainan at night in 2015, with the Shangri-La hotel standing prominently in the centre

Tainan is a city located in southern Taiwan, with a population of 1,874,917 as of 2020. It is the second largest city in southern Taiwan, after Kaohsiung, and the fifth largest metropolitan area in the country. Despite being the oldest city in Taiwan, Tainan has relatively few tall buildings, relative to other major cities in Taiwan. The tallest building in the city is the 140 m (459 ft), 38-story Shangri-La's Far Eastern Plaza Hotel Tainan, which has been the city's tallest building for over 30 years since it was built in 1993.

The first high-rises in the city appeared towards the late 1980s and early 1990s. Tainan's skyline is recent with most tall buildings being built after 2000. Commercial high-rises are relatively uncommon, with the tallest being the Fubon Financial Center, built in 2002. Instead, most of the city's high-rises are residential, and there have been a growing number of them built starting from the 2010s. With only four buildings above 100 m (328 ft) in 2010, this boom has led to the city having 13 of them as of 2026. However, none of them reach over 150 meters (492 feet).

The skyline of the city is quite disperse, with no particular area having the largest concentration of tall buildings. The city's tallest buildings are located in three central districts of Anping, West Central District (also known as Zhongxi District) and East District. The tallest residential high-rises that were built recently are mainly located in Anping and West Central District. Further projects under construction will add taller buildings to Annan and Shanhua districts above 100 m (328 ft).

== History ==
=== 1990s–2000s ===
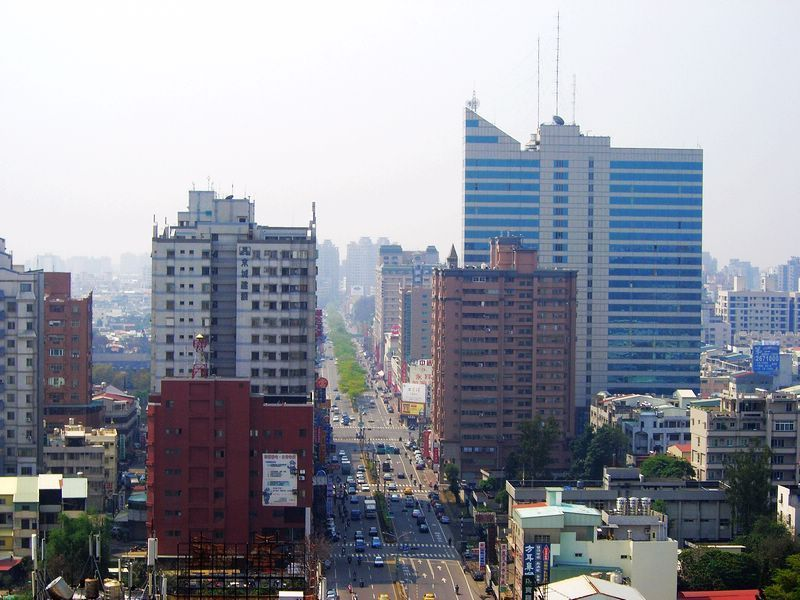
High-rises along a street in Yongkang

The first high-rises in Tainan appeared around the late 1980s and early 1990s. One of the earliest notable tall buildings was the Unique Golden Triangle, which became the city's tallest building at 101 m (332 ft) when it was complete in 1990. It would only hold that title momentarily, as it was soon overtaken by the Shangri-La's Far Eastern Plaza Hotel Tainan, which is still the city's tallest building today. At a height of 140 m (459 ft), the 38-story building houses a hotel managed by the Shangri-La Hotels and Resorts, while its lower floors contain a Far Eastern Department Store. Taking its antenna into account, the building reaches a height of 153 m (502 ft).

Other commercial high-rises built in this decade include Jing-Wei World (經緯天廈), built in 1991, and World Chinese Plaza (世華廣場), built in 1995, both between 90 and 100 m (295 to 328 ft) tall. Some of the earliest residential high-rises in the city were The First Garden (皇龍第一園) and Imperial Palace (天闕). With the exception of World Chinese Plaza, which is in Anping, the aforementioned buildings were all built on the eastern side of the city, in East District and Yongkang District.

In the 2000s, two high-rises were built that were taller than 100 m (328 ft), both office buildings in West Central District, along the Tainan Canal, the canal that separates West Central District from Anping. These are the Fubon Financial Center and Shin Kong Life Building. They are still the tallest buildings in West Central District.

=== 2010s-present ===
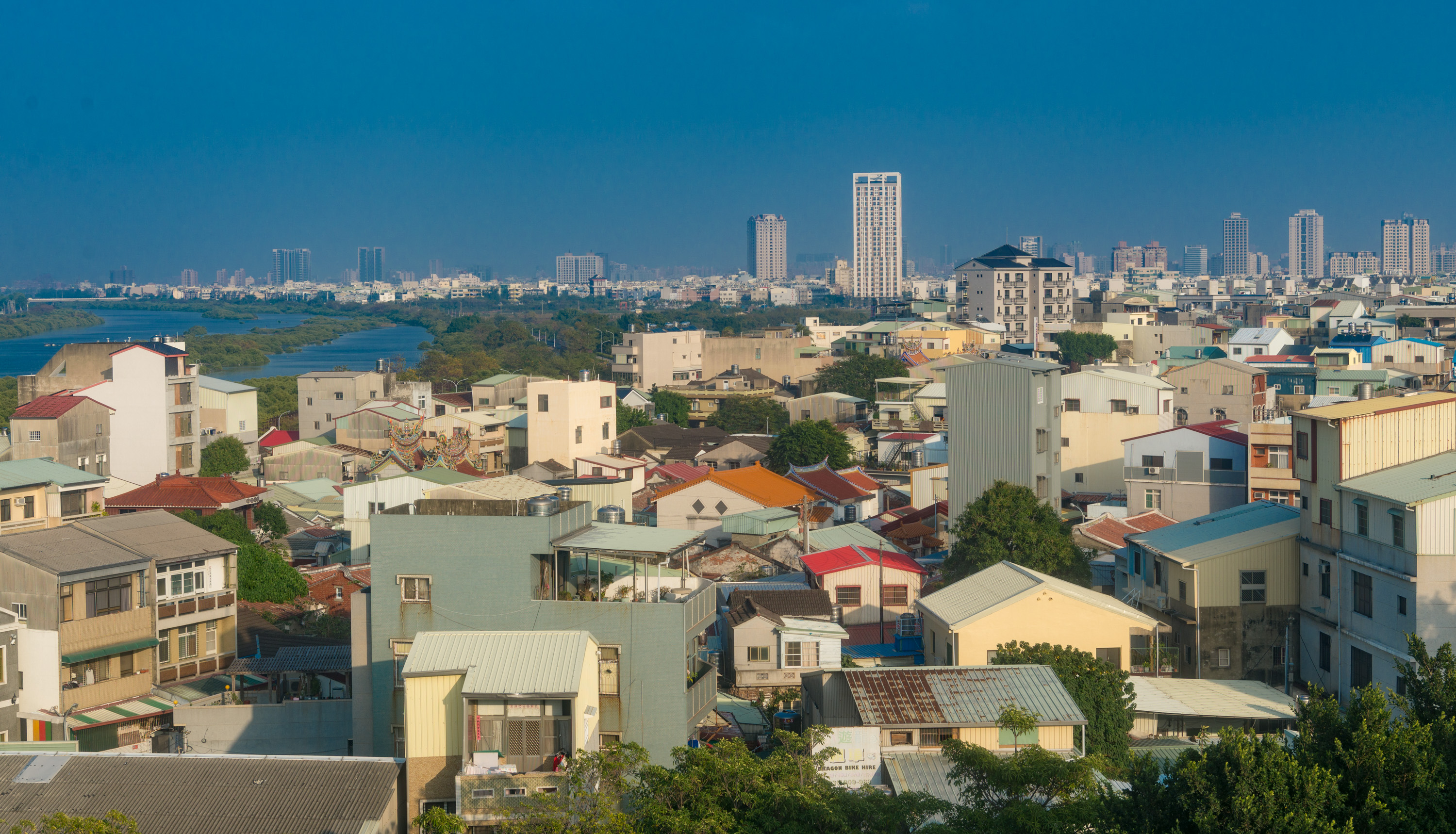
High-rises in the background in Anping

The 2010s would see a trend of increasing height in Tainan's residential high-rises. Beginning with Water & Cloud (水雲間) in 2013, residential towers greater than 100 m (328 ft) in height started to be built in Anping. This was followed by Xinyue City complex (新悅城) in 2016, Whole New Center I (龍騰領袖特區) in 2017, and Whole New Center II (龍騰菁英特區) in 2018.

This has continued into the 2020s, with new residential high-rises in Anping including Lianshang Haitang (聯上海棠) in 2023 and Love in the City (興富發愛琴海) in 2025; the latter is now the third tallest building in the city. Meanwhile, in West Central District, the residential high-rise The King (湖美帝璟) was completed in 2022, directly facing the wetlands to its northwest. Another high-rise built in the district was FULL One in 2020.

At the far northeast of the city's built-up area, in the suburban Shanhua District, the two-tower Greaten Group I complex was completed in 2023. Becoming the tallest buildings in the district at a height of 107 m (351 ft), the buildings reflect an increase in residential high-rises in Shanhua since the late 2010s.

== Map of tallest buildings ==
The following map shows the location of high-rises in the centre of Tainan that are taller than 100 m (328 ft). Each marker is numbered by the building's height rank, and colored by the decade of its completion.

Skyscrapers taller than 100 m in central Tainan. An asterisk (*) next to the name of the building indicates it is located outside the map.
- 1990s
- 2000s
- 2010s
- 2020s
1 Shangri-La's Far Eastern Plaza Hotel Tainan
2 Fubon Financial Center
3 Love in the City
4 Shin Kong Life Building
5 Whole New Center I
6 The King
7 Whole New Center II
8 Lianshang Haitang
9 Greaten Group I Tower 1*
10 Greaten Group I Tower 2*
11 FULL One
12 Unique Golden Triangle
13 Water & Cloud

== Tallest buildings ==
This list ranks completed buildings in Tainan that stand at least 100 m (328 ft) tall, based on standard height measurement. This height includes spires and architectural details but does not include antenna masts. The "Year" column indicates the year of completion. Buildings tied in height are sorted by year of completion with earlier buildings ranked first, and then alphabetically.

Was the tallest building in Tainan upon completion

Rank	Name	Image	Location	Height m (ft)	Floors	Year	Purpose	Notes
1	Shangri-La's Far Eastern Plaza Hotel Tainan (香格里拉台南遠東國際大飯店)		East District 22°59′47″N 120°12′52″E	140 (459)	38	1993	Hotel	Tallest building in Tainan since 1993. Tallest building completed in Tainan in the 1990s.
2	Fubon Financial Center (富邦台南金融中心)	–	West Central District 22°59′47″N 120°11′31″E	125.2 (411)	19	2002	Office	Tallest office building in Tainan. Tallest building completed in Tainan in the 2000s.
3	Love in the City (興富發愛琴海)	–	Anping District 22°58′57″N 120°10′01″E	122.7 (403)	34	2025	Residential	Tallest residential building in Tainan. Tallest building completed in Tainan in the 2020s.
4	Shin Kong Life Building (新光人壽臺南運河大樓)	–	West Central District 22°59′49″N 120°11′27″E	109.1 (358)	24	2001	Office	
5	Whole New Center I (龍騰領袖特區)	–	Anping District 22°59′30″N 120°10′11″E	109 (358)	29	2017	Residential	Tallest building completed in Tainan in the 2010s.
6	The King (湖美帝璟)	–	West Central District 23°00′18″N 120°10′37″E	109 (358)	29	2022	Residential	
7	Whole New Center II (龍騰菁英特區)	–	Anping District 22°59′25″N 120°10′46″E	108.9 (357)	29	2018	Residential	
8	Lianshang Haitang (聯上海棠)	–	Anping District 22°59′01″N 120°10′00″E	108.7 (357)	29	2023	Residential	
9	Greaten Group I Tower 1 (桂田盤古一期)	–	Shanhua District 23°07′57″N 120°18′14″E	106.9 (351)	26	2023	Residential	
10	Greaten Group I Tower 2 (桂田盤古一期)	–	Shanhua District 23°07′59″N 120°18′15″E	106.9 (351)	26	2023	Residential	
11	FULL One (福容ONE)	–	West Central District 22°59′54″N 120°11′14″E	105.2 (345)	27	2020	Residential	
12	Unique Golden Triangle (良美金三角大樓)		Yongkang District 22°59′56″N 120°14′03″E	101 (331)	24	1990	Residential	Tallest building in Tainan from 1990 to 1993.
13	Water & Cloud (水雲間)	–	Anping District 22°59′32″N 120°09′55″E	100.2 (329)	26	2013	Residential	

== Tallest under construction or proposed ==
=== Under construction ===
The following table ranks buildings that are under construction in Tainan that are expected to be at least 100 m (328 ft) tall as of 2026, based on standard height measurement. The “Year” column indicates the expected year of completion. Buildings that are on hold are not included. A dash "–" indicates information about the building's floor count or year of completion.

Name	Location	Height m (ft)	Floors	Purpose	Year	Notes
Mansion of Waterfront (上曜湖映白)	Annan District	124.3 (408)	35	Residential	2027	
Greaten Group II (桂田磐古 II)	Shanhua District	117 (384)	30	Residential	2029	
Boundless Vision (浩瀚無極)	East District	106 (348)	29	Residential	2028	
Vast Expanse (富立元翰門)	Anping District	102.5 (336)	26	Residential	2026	

== Timeline of tallest buildings ==
Name	Image	Years as tallest	Height m (ft)	Floors
Unique Golden Triangle (良美金三角大樓)		1990–1993	101 (332)	24
Shangri-La's Far Eastern Plaza Hotel Tainan (香格里拉台南遠東國際大飯店)		1993–present	140 (459)	38
