= Shangri-La Far Eastern, Taipei =

Hotel in Da'an, Taipei, Taiwan

- 台北遠東香格里拉飯店
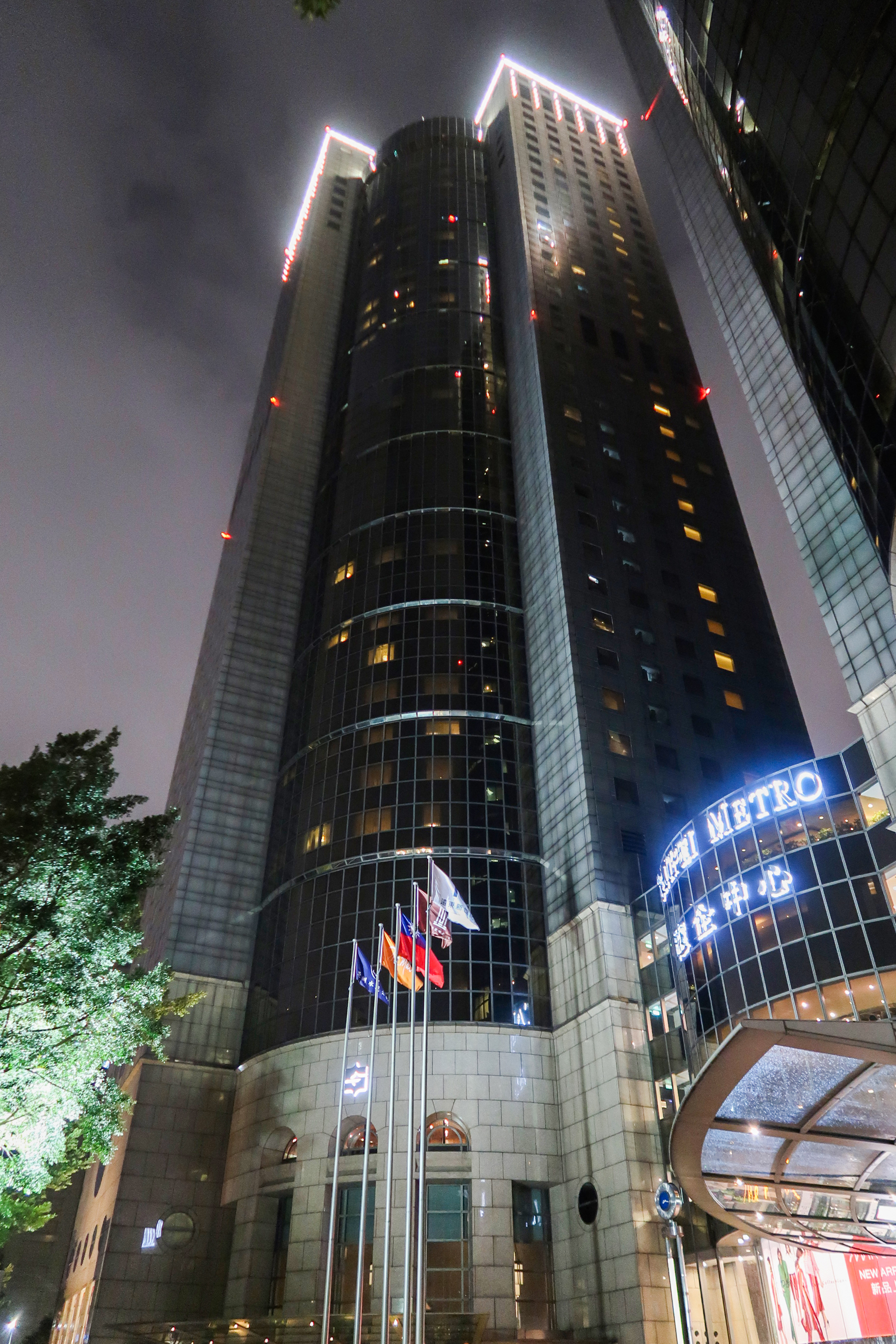
- Shangri-La Far Eastern, Taipei at night

- Location within Taiwan

General information
- Status: Completed
- Type: Hotel
- Architectural style: Skyscraper
- Location: No. 201, Section 2, Dunhua South Road, Da'an District, Taipei, Taiwan
- Coordinates: 25°1′35″N 121°32′56″E
- Completed: 1994
- Opening: December 1994
- Operator: Shangri-La International Hotel Management Limited

Technical details
- Floor count: 43

Design and construction
- Architects: Palmer and Turner and Chu-Yuan Lee
- Other designers: Chhada Siembieda Remedios Inc.

Other information
- Number of rooms: 420
- Number of suites: 53

Website
- Shangri-La Far Eastern, Taipei

Shangri-La Far Eastern, Taipei (Chinese: 台北遠東香格里拉飯店) is a five-star luxury hotel located in Da'an District, Taipei, Taiwan. It is managed by Shangri-La Hotels and Resorts. The hotel has 420 rooms and suites and opened in December 1994.

Shangri-La Far Eastern, Taipei has received many distinguished guests in the past, including former U.S. President Bill Clinton, Hollywood movie stars Tom Cruise and Pierce Brosnan, action hero Jackie Chan, as well as directors Ang Lee and John Woo.

== Design and construction ==
Shangri-La Far Eastern, Taipei was designed by architects Palmer and Turner from Hong Kong and Chu-Yuan Lee from Taiwan as part of the Far Eastern Plaza complex in the center of the city. The original interior design was created by Chhada Siembieda Remedios Inc., taking inspiration from the Song dynasty, featuring era-inspired sculptures and specially commissioned paintings throughout the hotel.

== Features ==
The hotel has 420 rooms of which 53 are suites. The hotel also has six restaurants, 3 bars and lounges, a rooftop pool and a Shiseido-branded spa.

=== Restaurants ===
- Café at Far Eastern: A buffet restaurant with open-kitchen and 12 themed gourmet zones offering cuisines from around the world.
- ibuki: A Japanese style restaurant offering a wide range of Japanese dishes, including teppanyaki and sushi.
- Marco Polo: An Italian restaurant with a view of Taipei.
- Shang Palace: A Cantonese restaurant providing dim sum and a selection of other traditional delicacies.
- Shanghai Pavilion: A Shanghainese restaurant on the 39th floor, with a view of Taipei's skyline.
- The Cake Room: A pastry shop offering a variety of breads, cakes, pastries and desserts.

=== Bars and Lounges ===
- Li Bai Lounge: East and West fusion style bar.
- Lobby Court: A gin bar with over 40 brands of gin from around the world and live music performances.
- Marco Polo Lounge: Located on the top floor, the lounge provides afternoon tea featuring handmade sandwiches and delicate desserts with a view of the Taipei 101.

== Awards ==
It was voted the “Best Business Hotel in Taipei” by CNN Business Traveller Asia Pacific for five consecutive years and recently voted as “The Most Fabulous Hotel in Taiwan” by EZtravel.

== Gallery ==
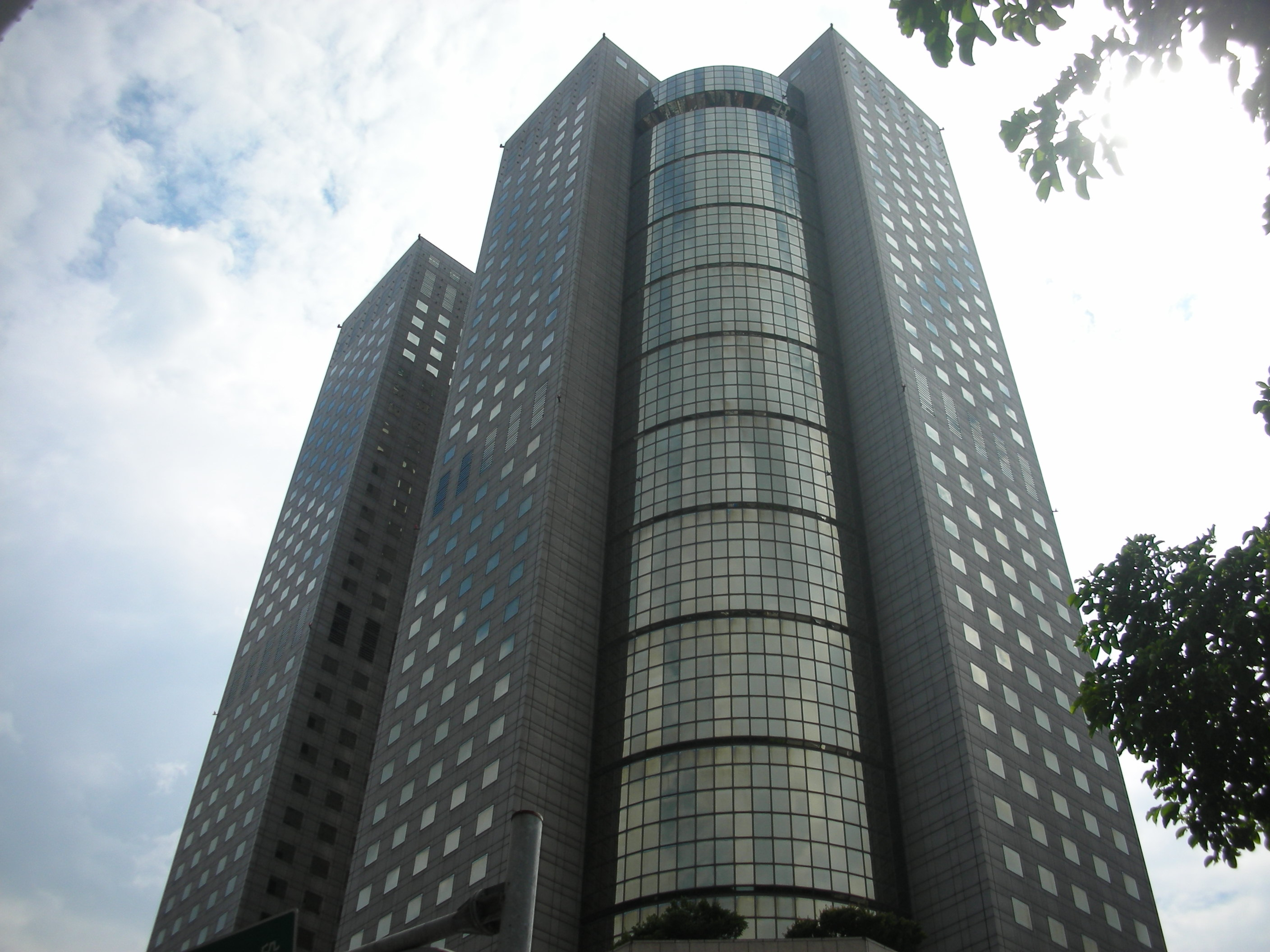
Exterior

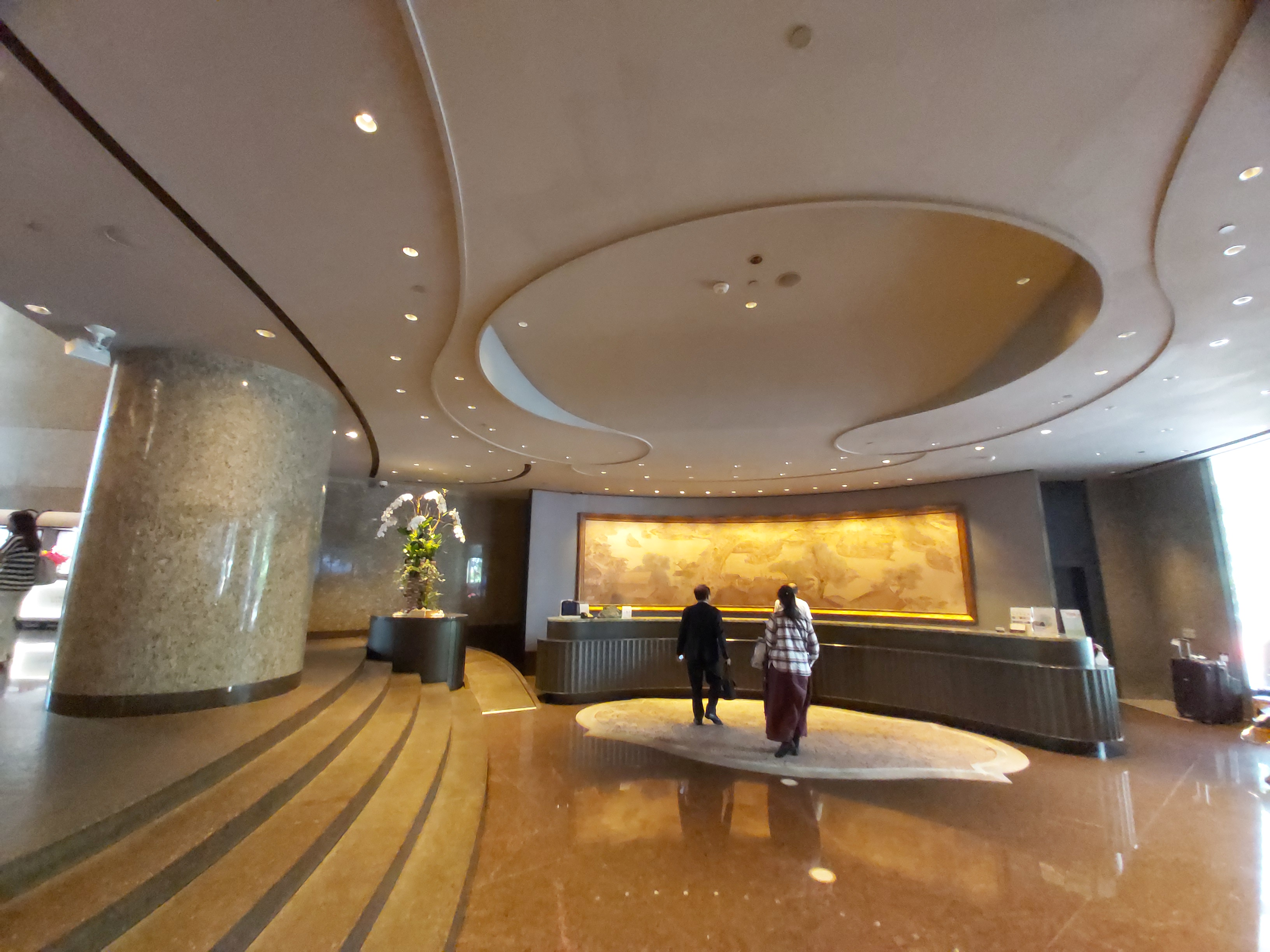
Lobby

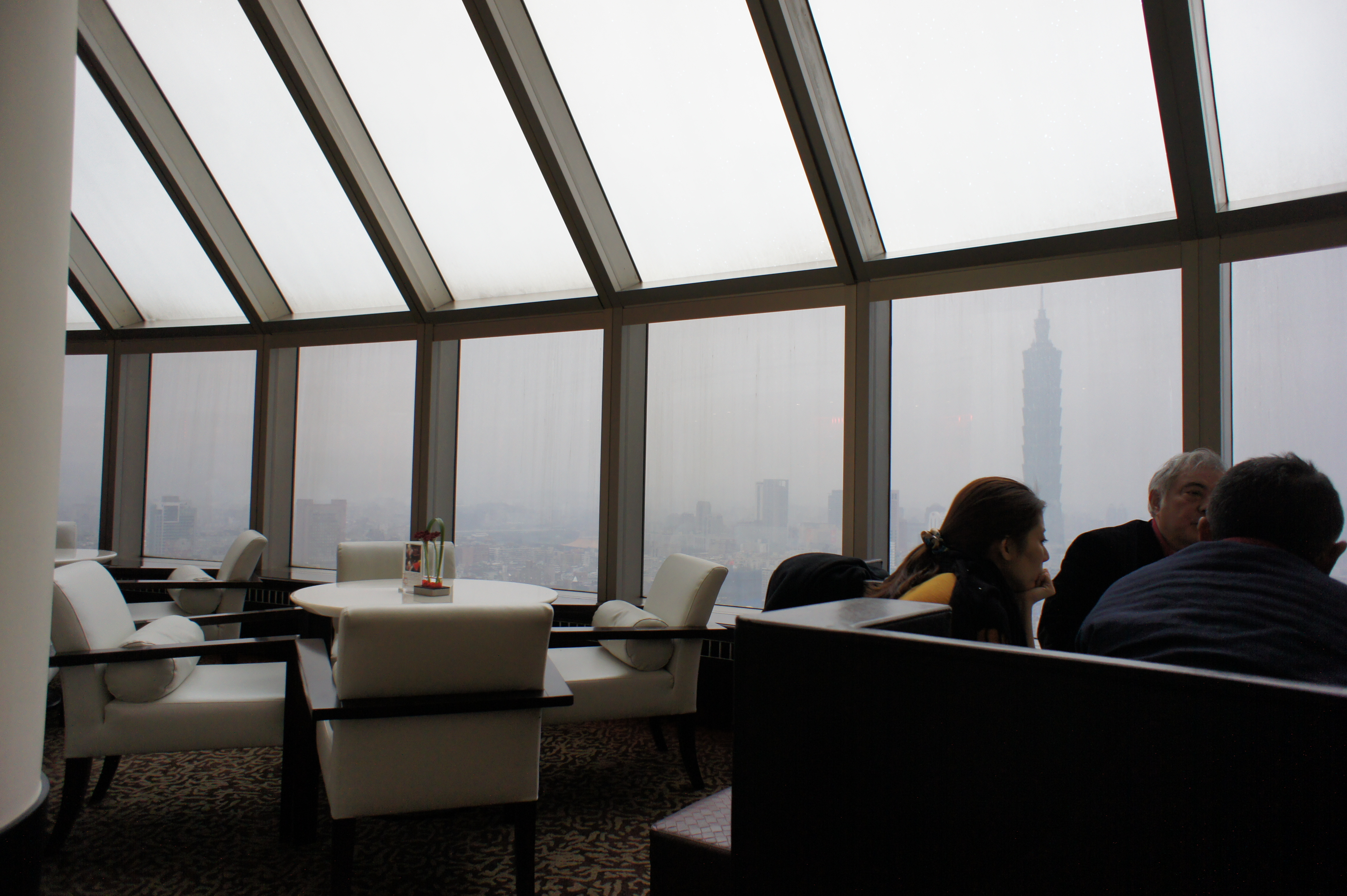
Marco Polo Lounge

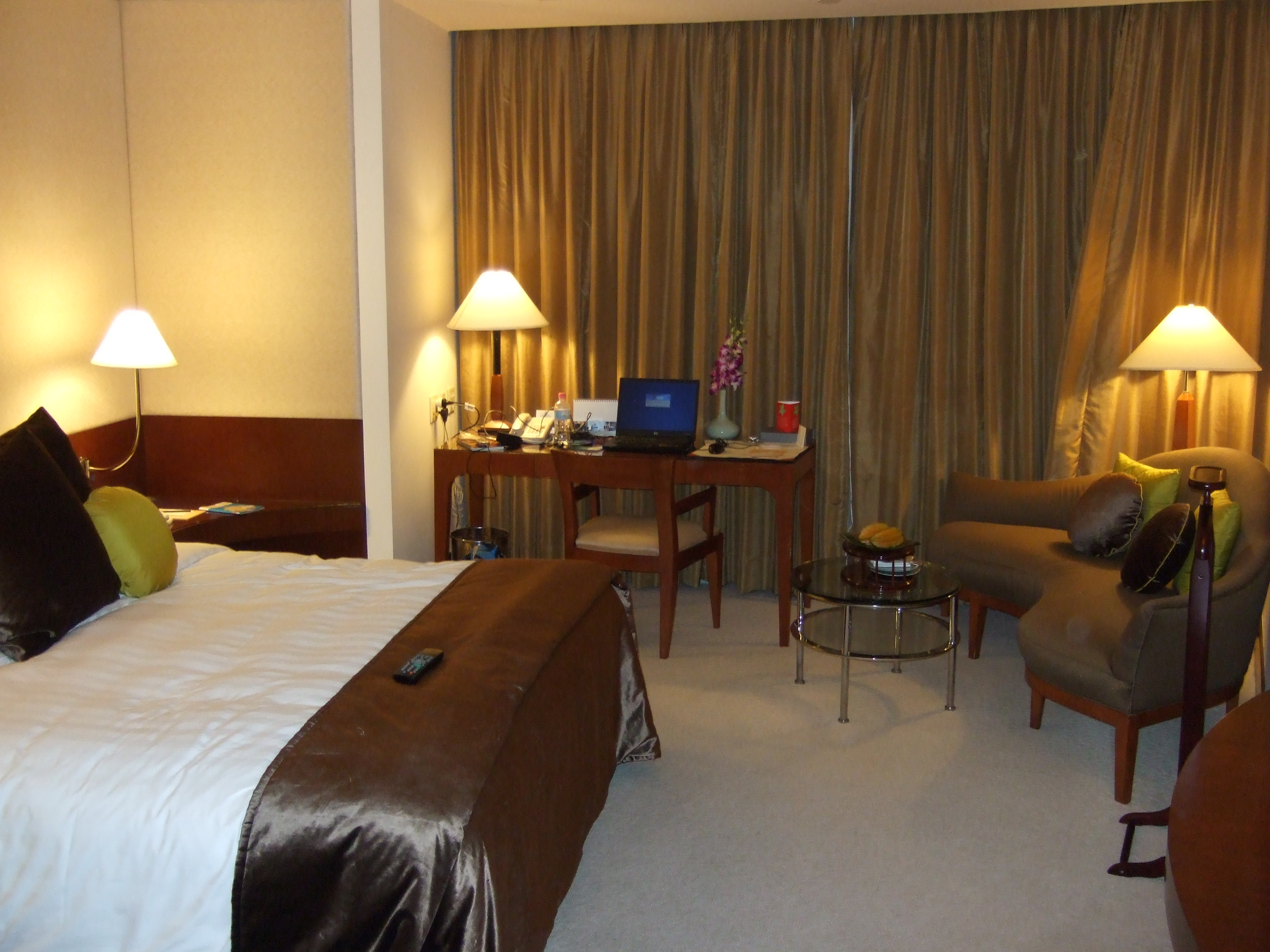
Room in 2007

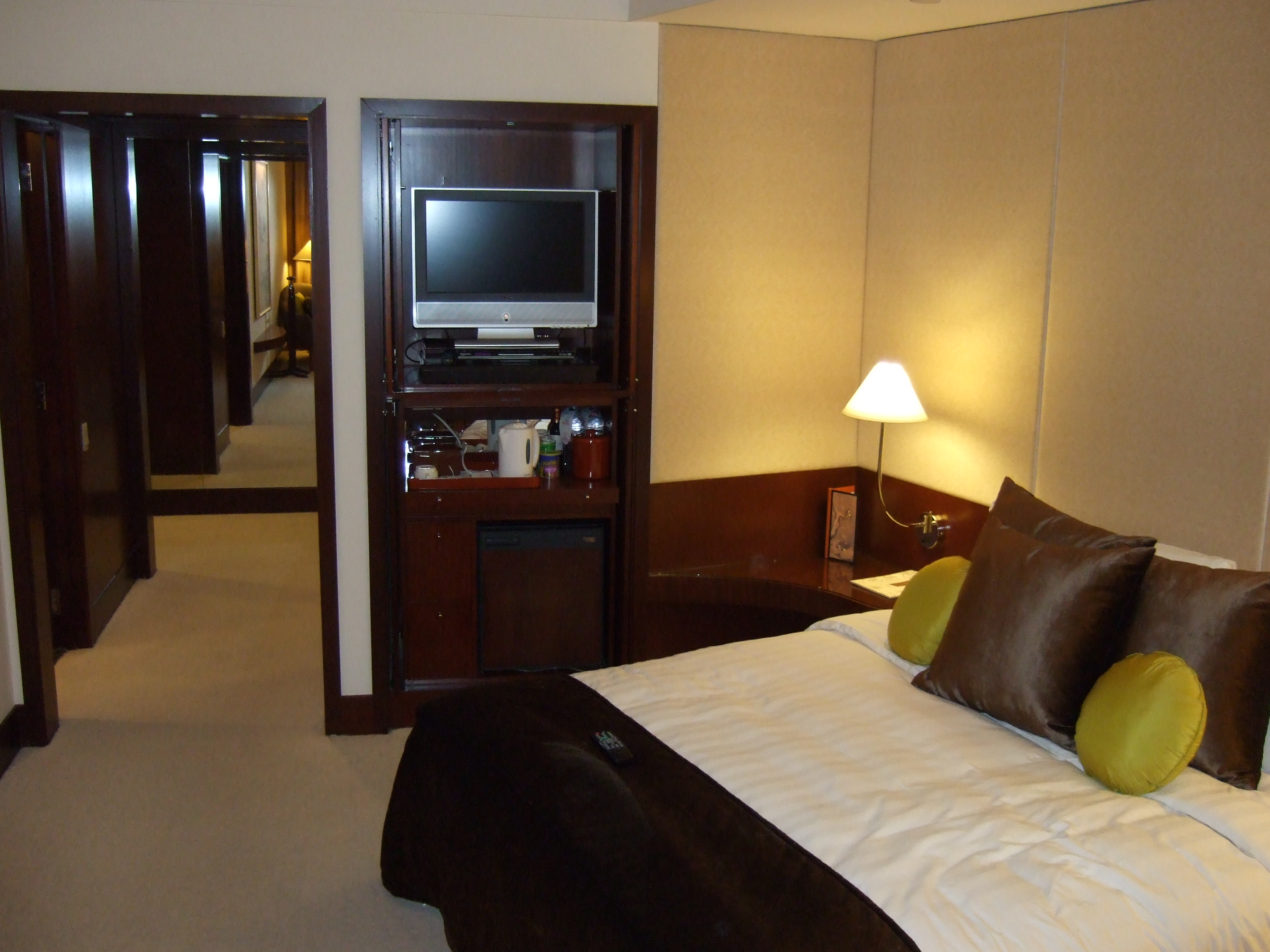
Room in 2007

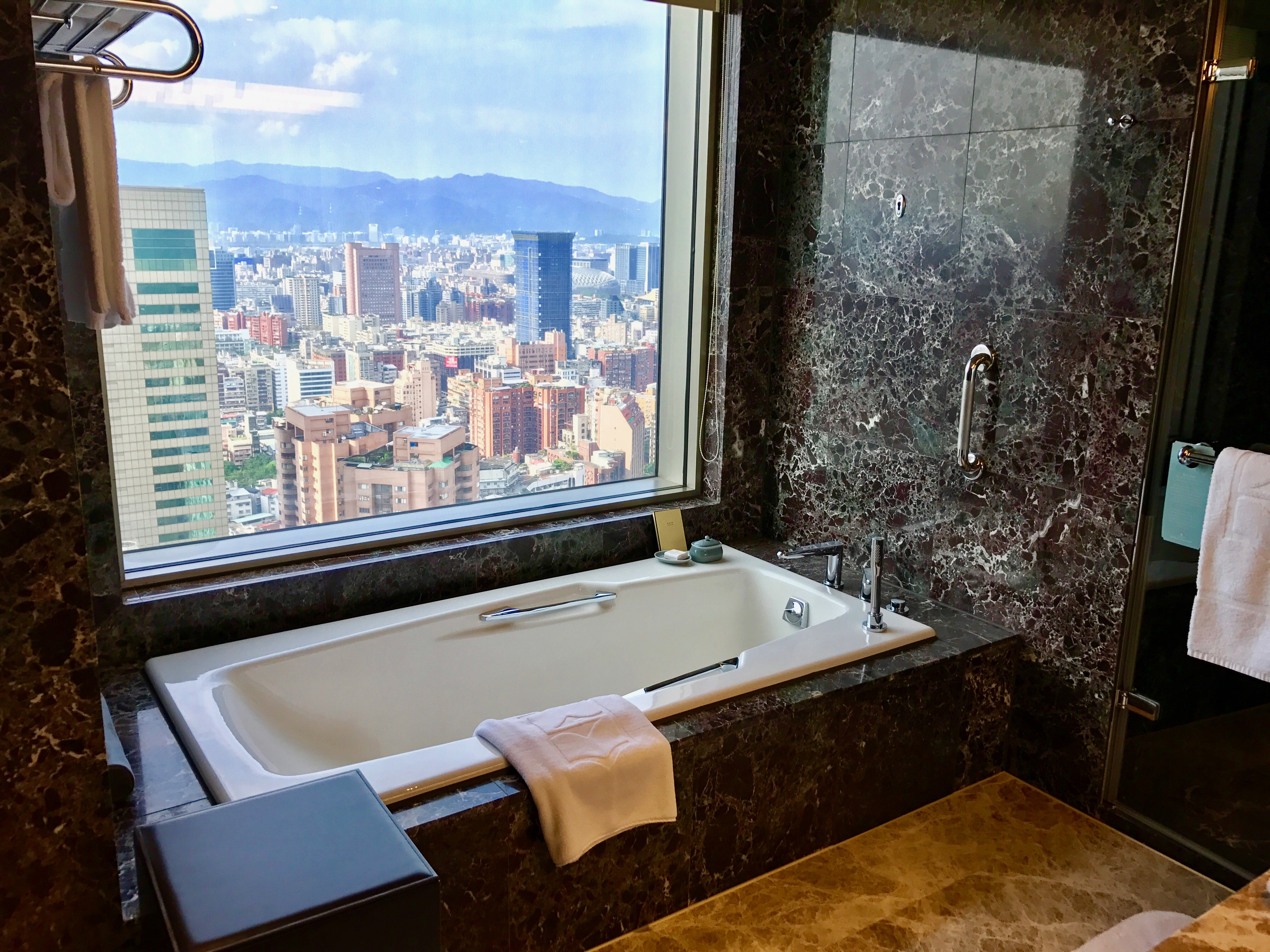
Bathroom

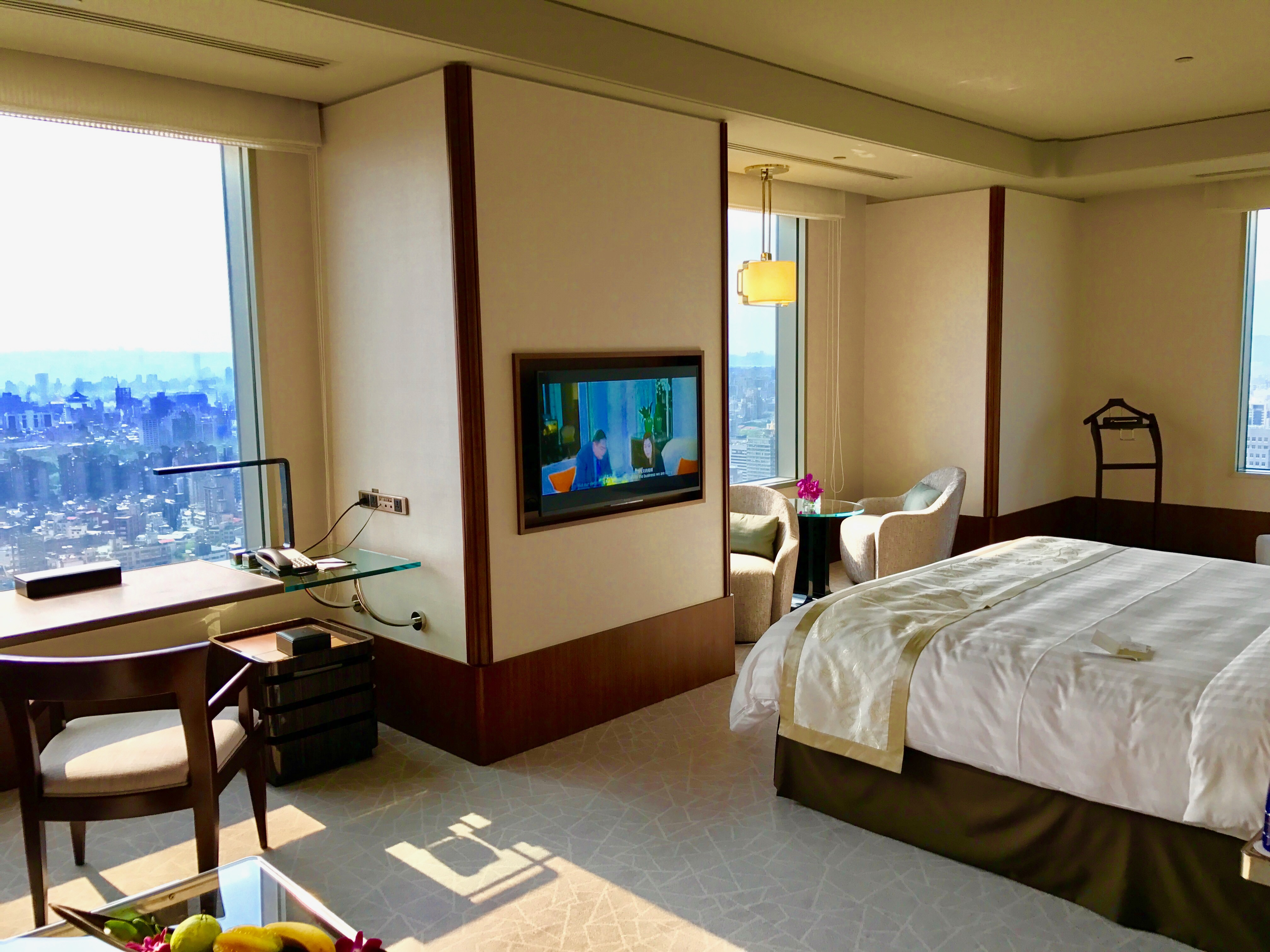
Room in 2017

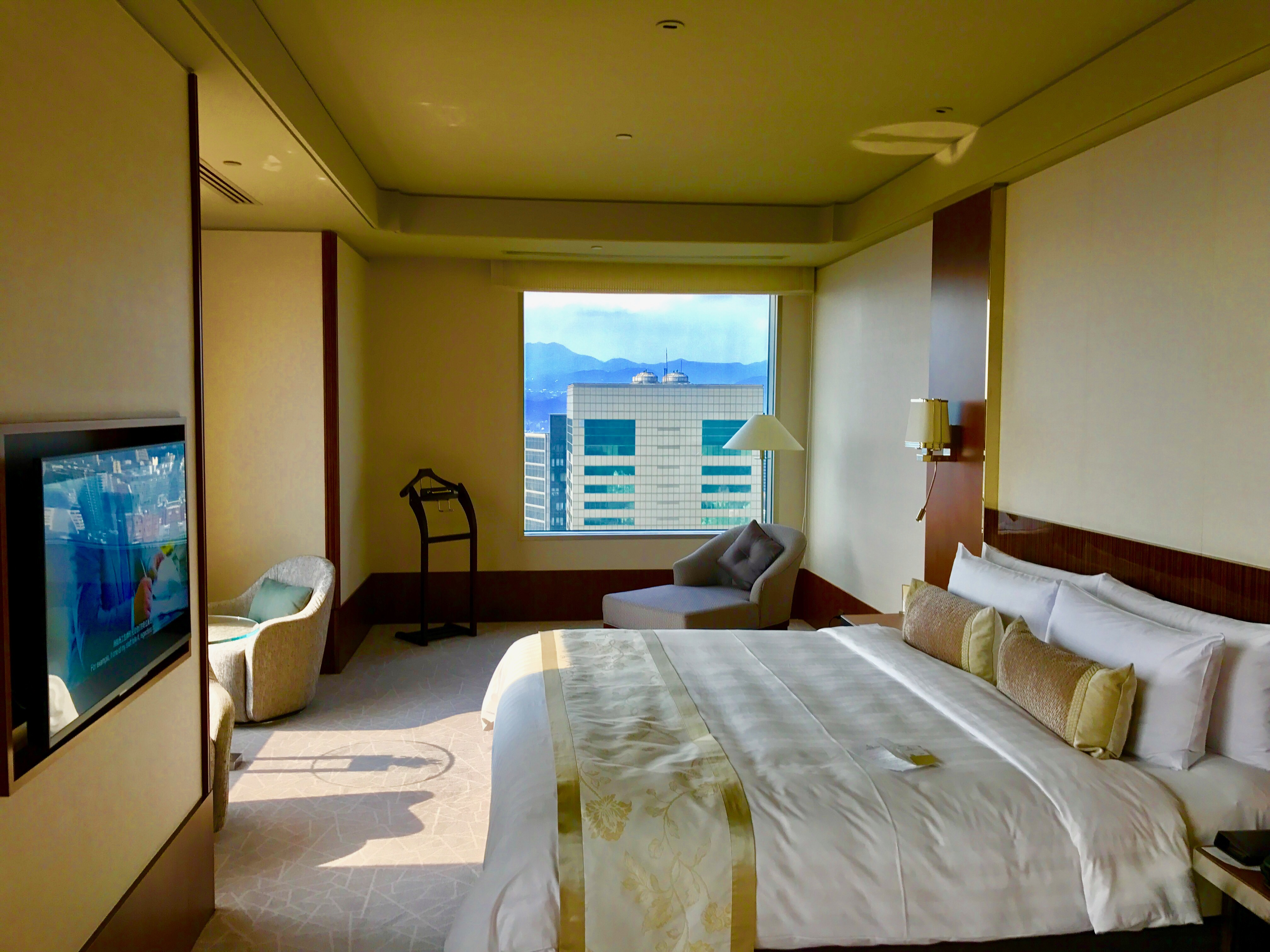
Room in 2017

== See also ==
- Shangri-La's Far Eastern Plaza Hotel Tainan
- Shangri-La Hotels and Resorts
- Far Eastern Plaza
