= Far Eastern Plaza =

Taiwanese skyscraper comples

- 遠企中心辦公大樓
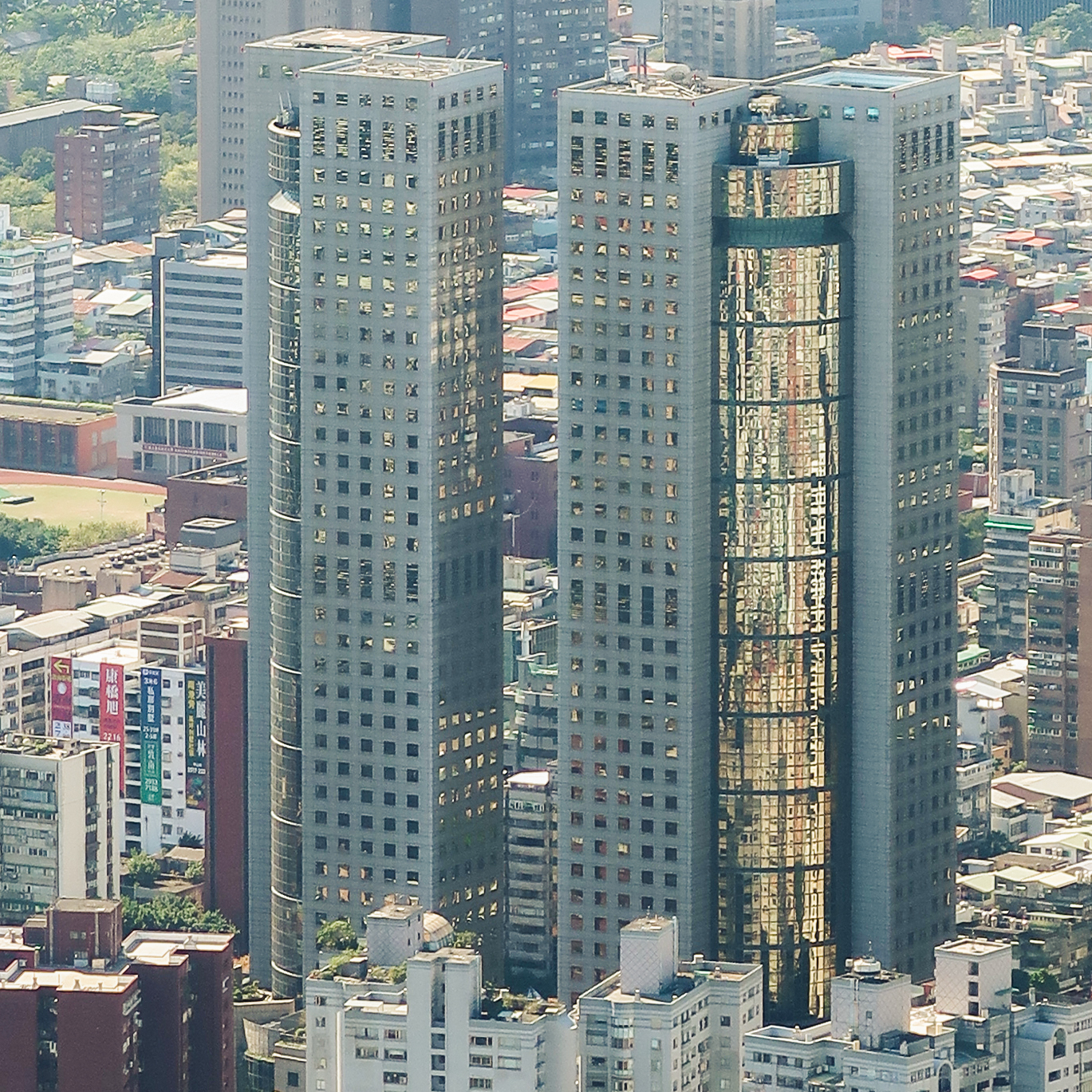
- Interactive map of the Far Eastern Plaza area

General information
- Status: Completed
- Type: Office building, Shopping mall
- Location: Daan District, Taipei, Taiwan
- Coordinates: 25°1′35″N 121°32′56″E
- Construction started: 1990
- Completed: 1994

Height
- Roof: 165 m (541 ft)

Technical details
- Floor count: 41

Design and construction
- Architect: Chu-Yuan Lee

The Far Eastern Plaza (Chinese: 遠企中心辦公大樓; pinyin: Yuǎn qǐ zhōngxīn bàngōng dàlóu) is a set of twin skyscrapers located in Daan District, Taipei, Taiwan. The buildings are each 165 m (541 ft) in height, rising 41 floors above the ground. The towers, designed by the Taiwanese architect Chu-Yuan Lee and the P&T Group, were completed in 1994 and were among the earliest skyscrapers in Taipei.

The south tower mainly contains offices whilst the north tower houses Shangri-La Far Eastern, Taipei. It is managed by the Shangri-La Hotels and Resorts and has a total of 420 rooms. This is Shangri-La's second base in Taiwan, along with Shangri-La's Far Eastern International Hotel, Tainan. In recent years, it has won a medal from the Environmental Protection Administration for energy conservation and environmental protection. The Mall at Far Eastern Plaza opened in 1994 and currently houses the citysuper retail chain as well as Muji.

== Gallery ==
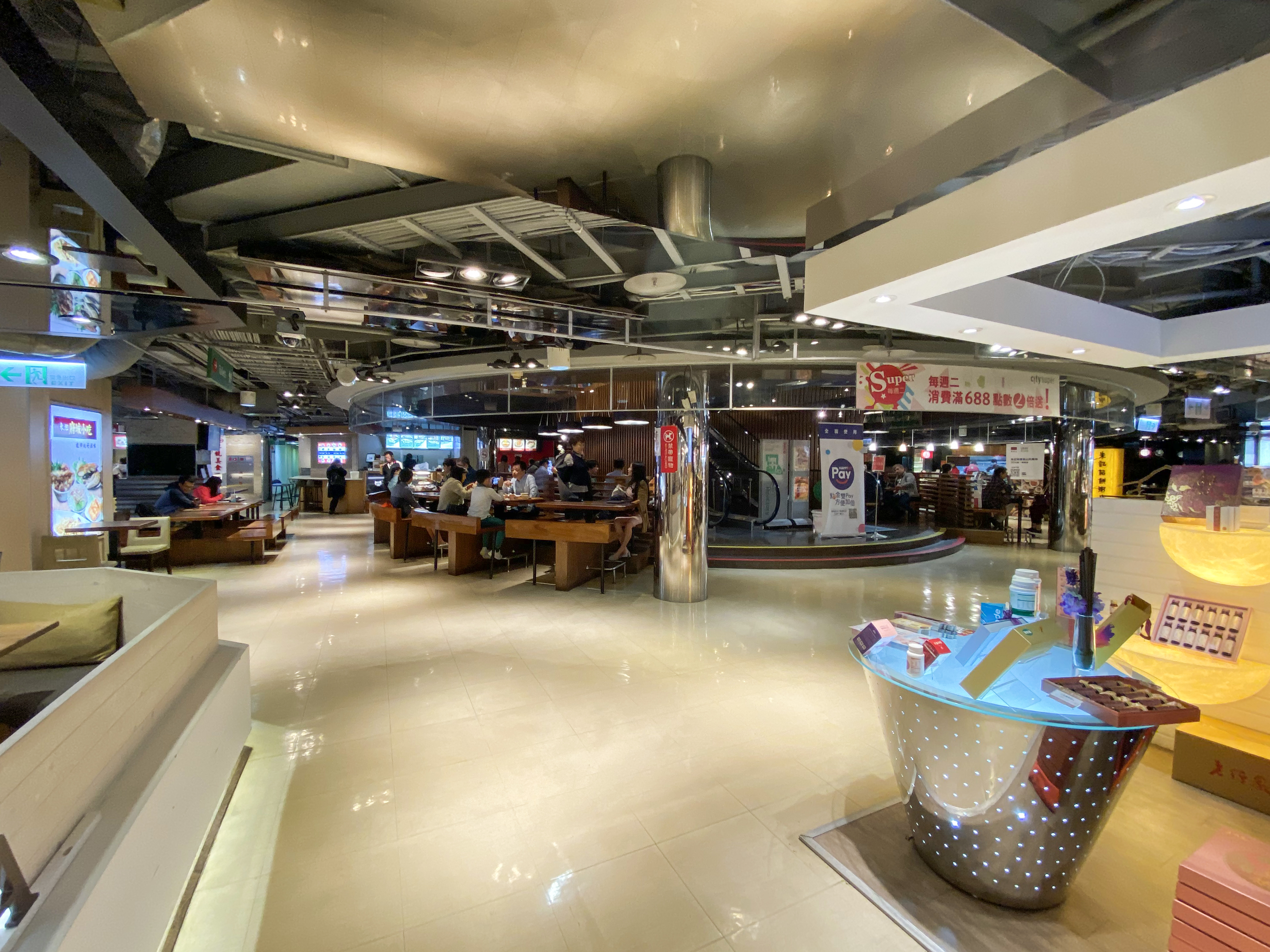
B2 Food Hall

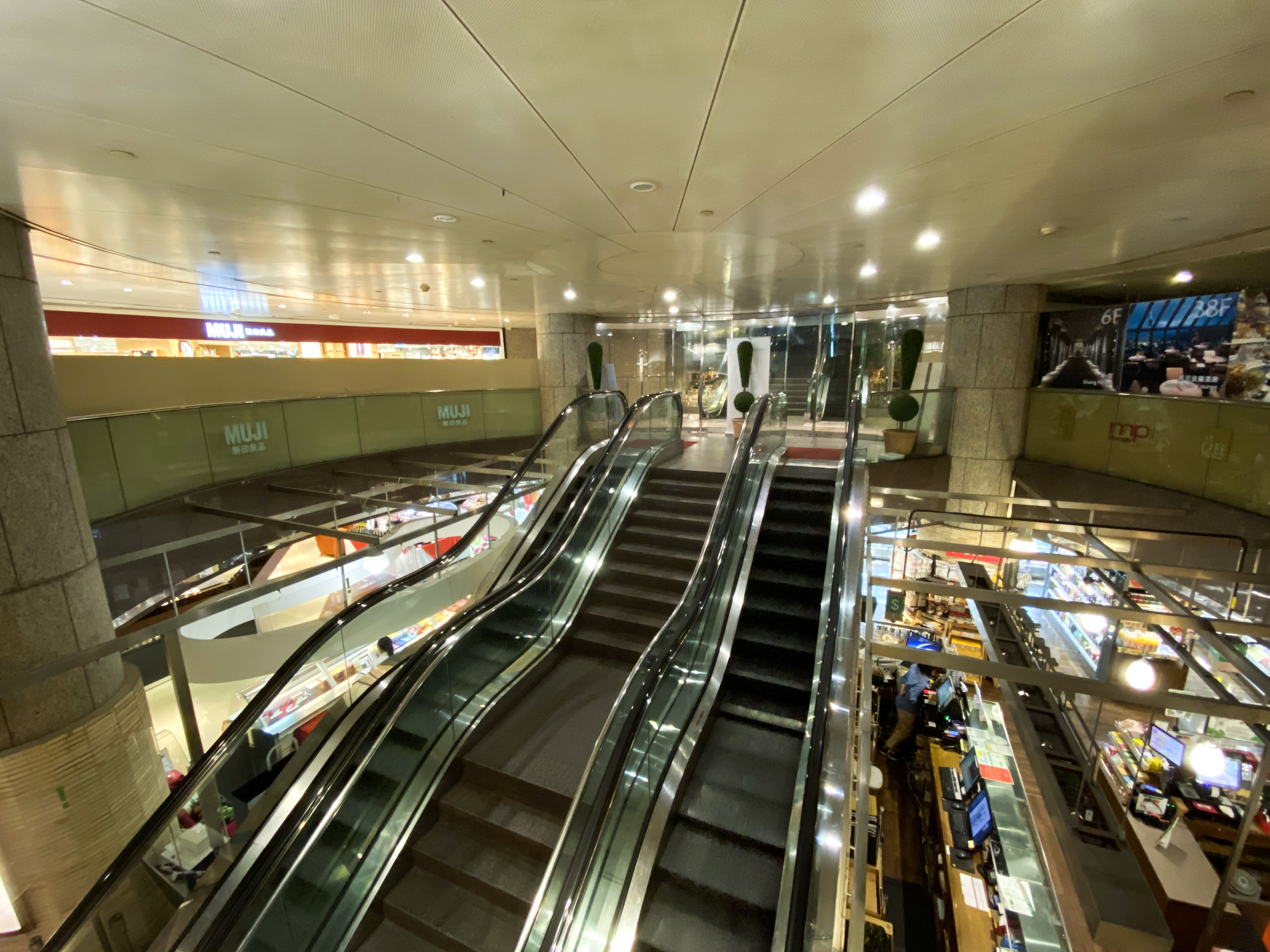
B1 Void

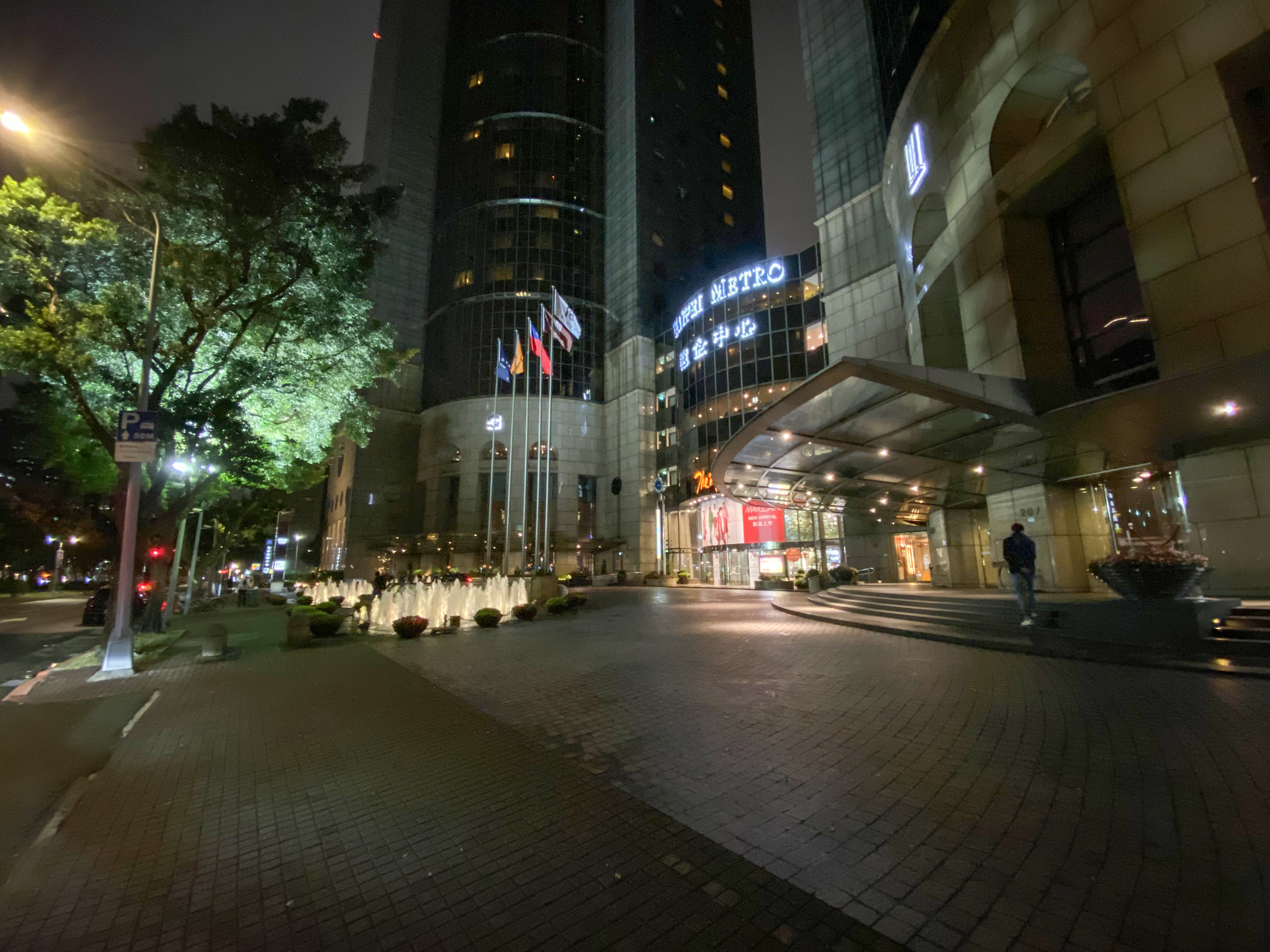
Building Drop-off Area

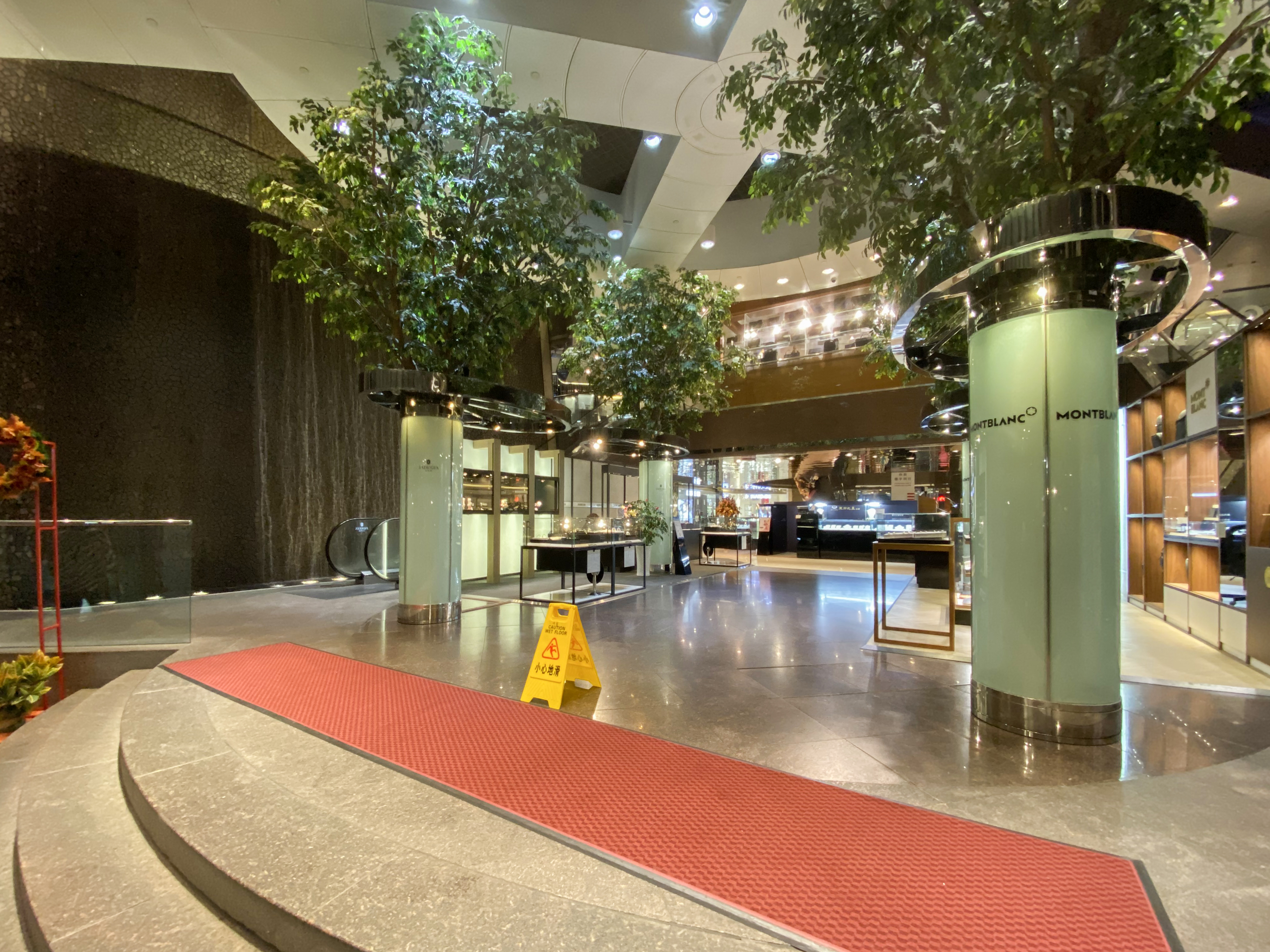
Entrance Void

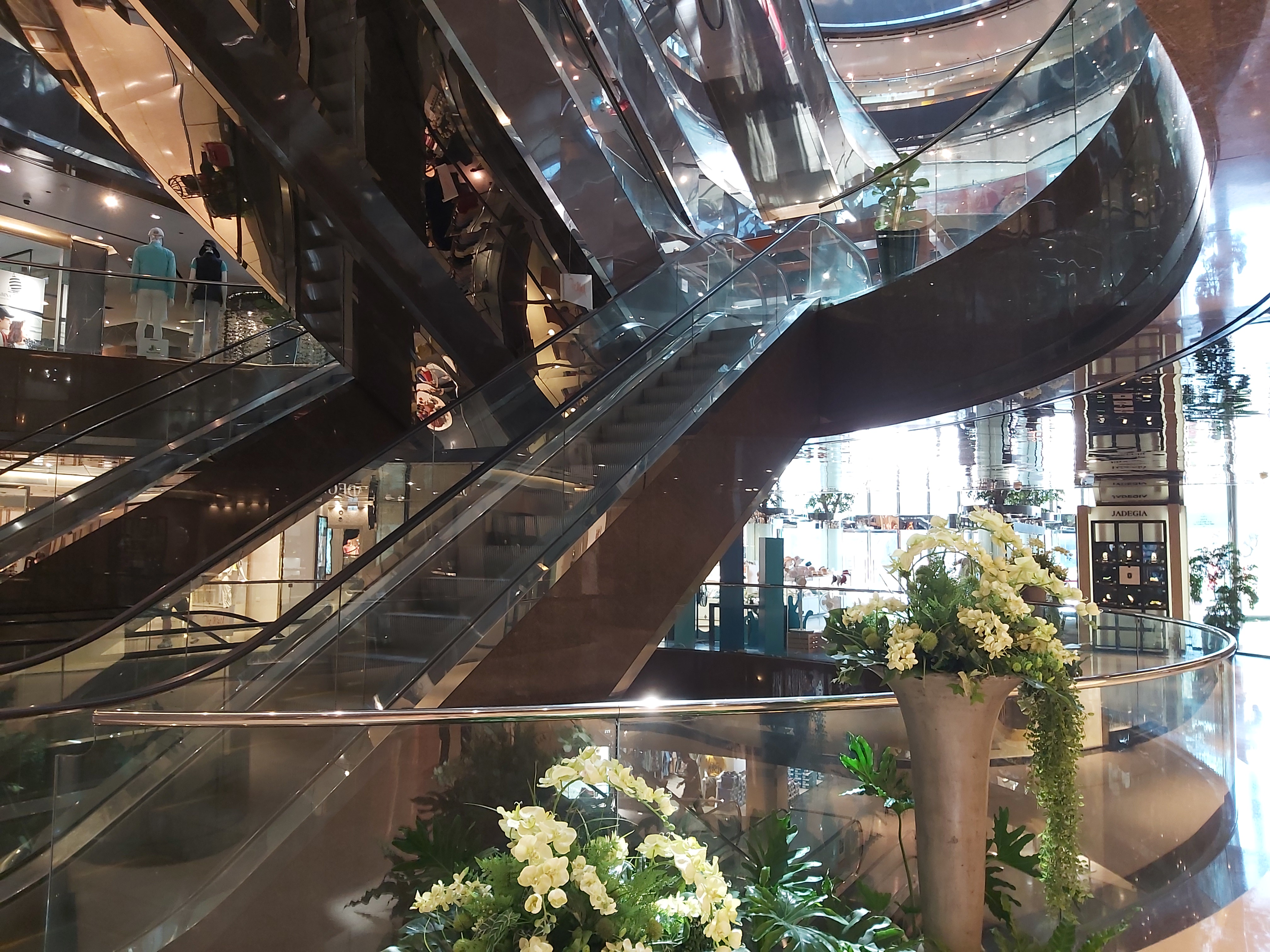
Level 1 Escalator

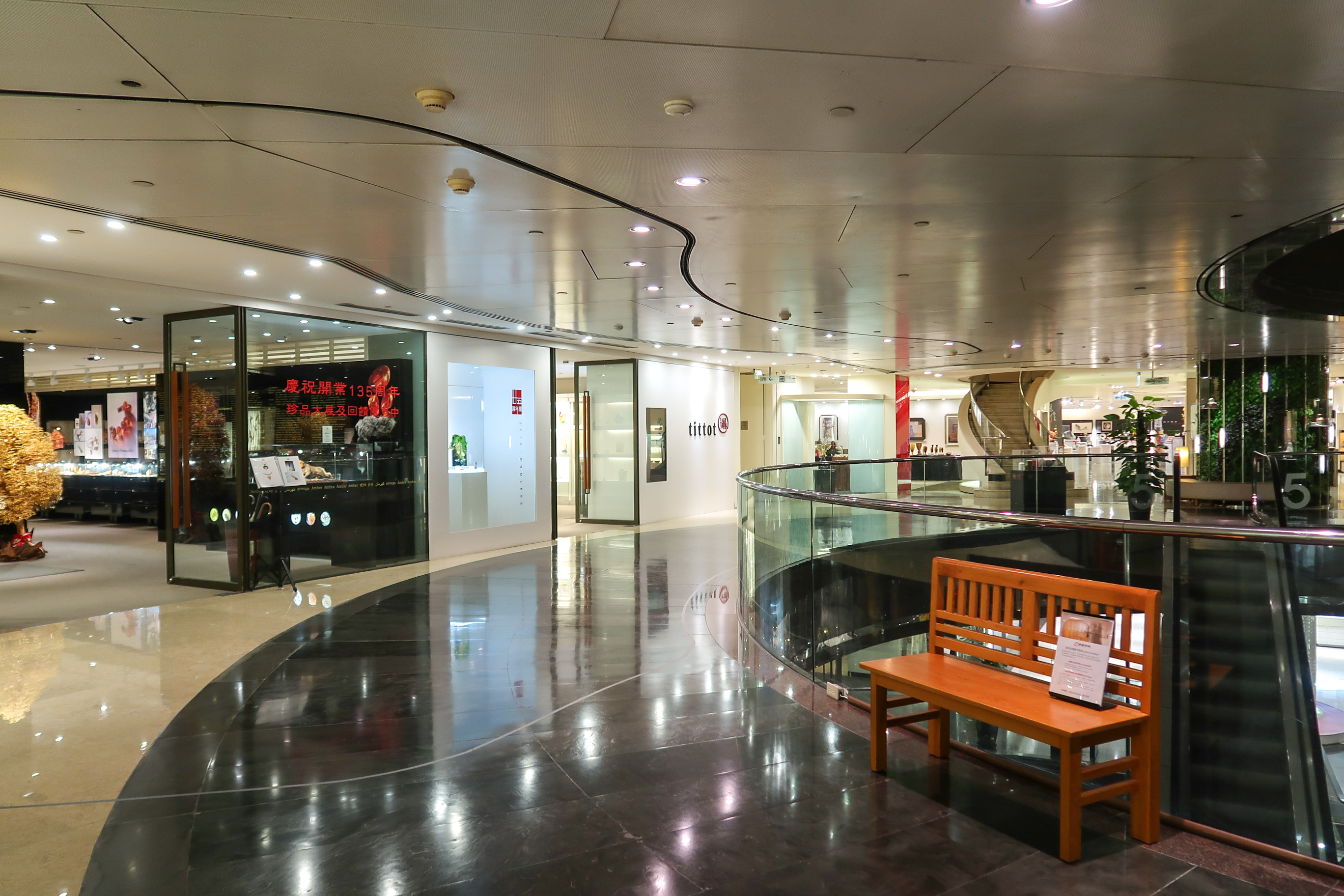
Level 5

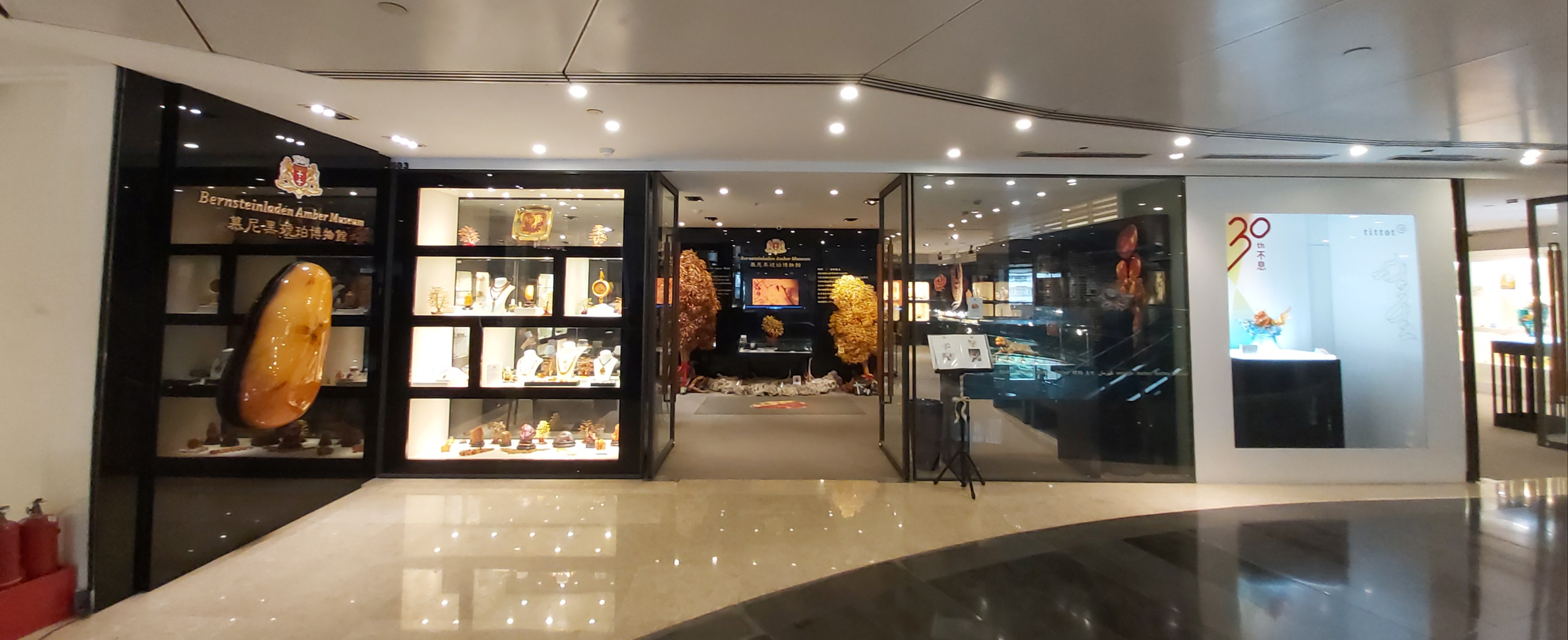
Bernsteinladen Amber Museum

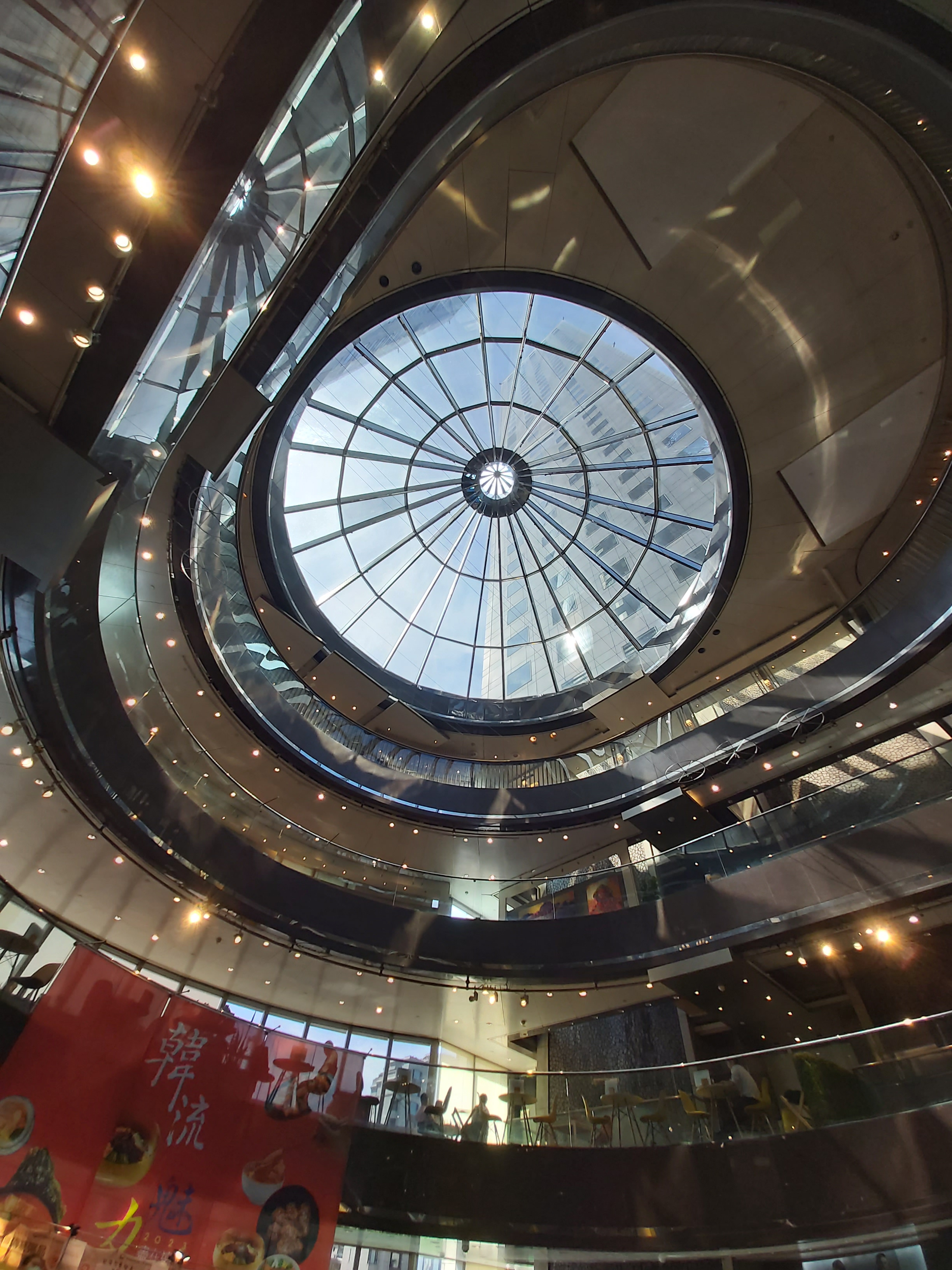
Ceiling

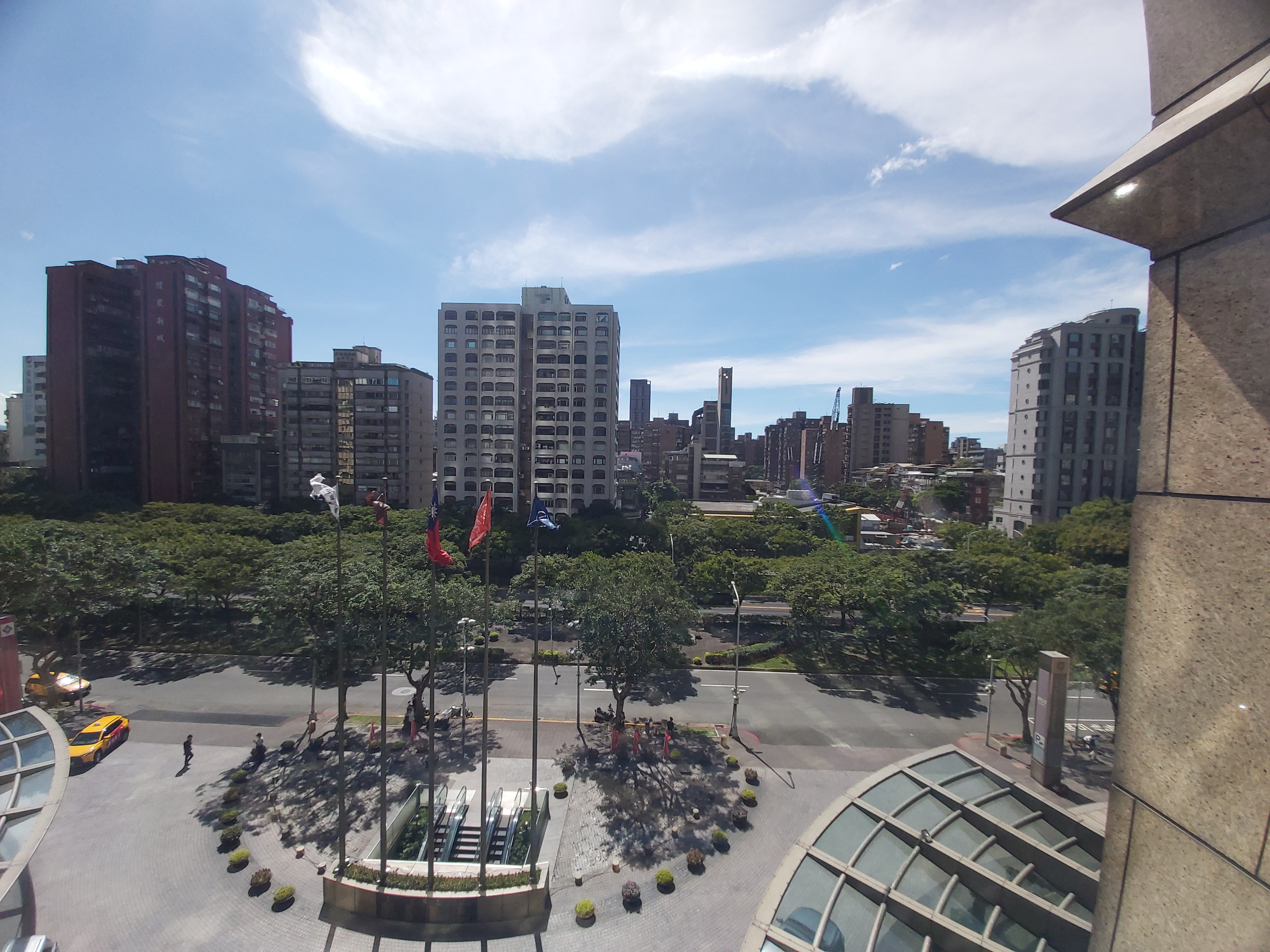
View

== See also ==
- List of tallest buildings in Taiwan
- List of tallest buildings in Taipei
- Shangri-La Far Eastern, Taipei
