= Shangri-La Hotel, Tokyo =

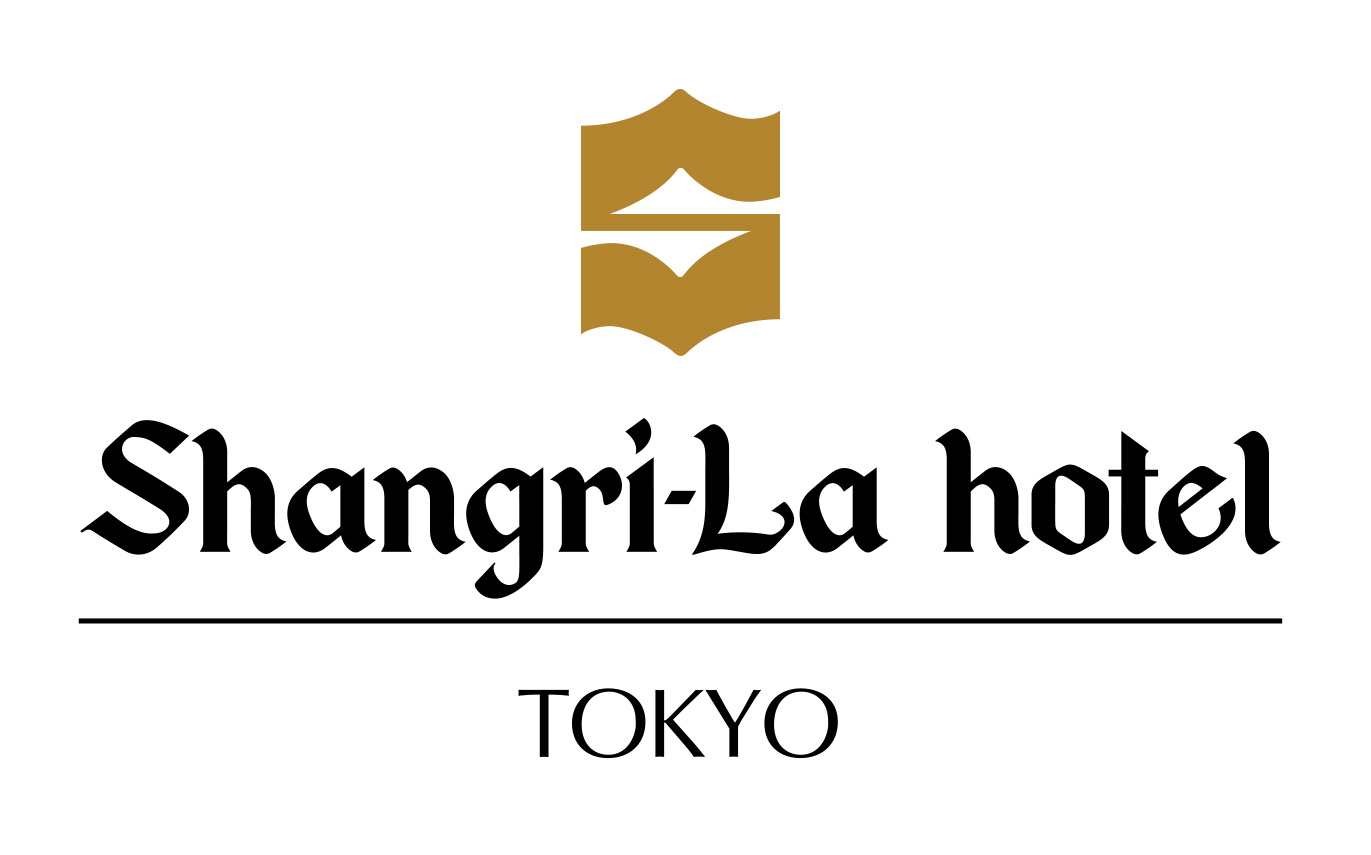

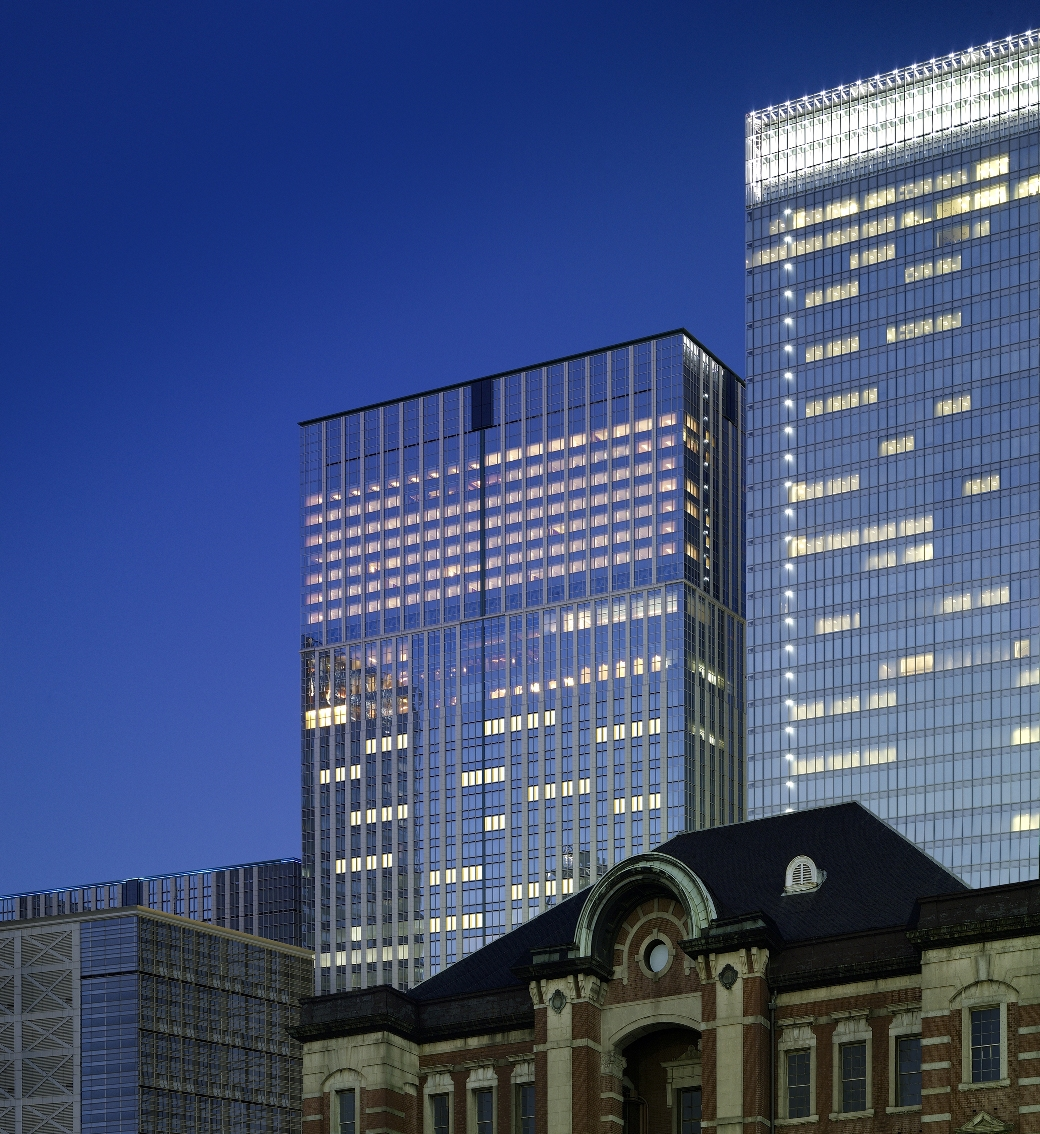
- The Shangri-La Hotel, Tokyo, with Tokyo Station in the foreground.

General information
- Status: Completed
- Type: Hotel
- Architectural style: High-rise
- Location: Marunouchi Trust Tower Main, 1-8-3 Marunouchi, Chiyoda-ku, Tokyo, Japan
- Coordinates: 35.682535°N 139.769472°E
- Construction started: 2006
- Completed: 2008
- Opening: March 2, 2009
- Operator: Shangri-La Hotels Japan

Technical details
- Floor count: 11

Design and construction
- Architect: Yasui Architects
- Developer: Toda Corporation

Other information
- Number of rooms: 200

Website
- www.shangri-la.com/tokyo/shangrila

The Shangri-La Hotel, Tokyo (シャングリ・ラ ホテル 東京, Shanguri Ra Hoteru Tōkyō) is a luxury hotel located in the Tokyo Station complex in Chiyoda, Tokyo, Japan.

== History ==
The Shangri-La Hotel, Tokyo, was opened on March 2, 2009. It was the first property in Japan from Shangri-La Hotels and Resorts. The hotel has 200 guestrooms and suites occupying 11 floors of the Mori-built Marunouchi Trust Tower Main.

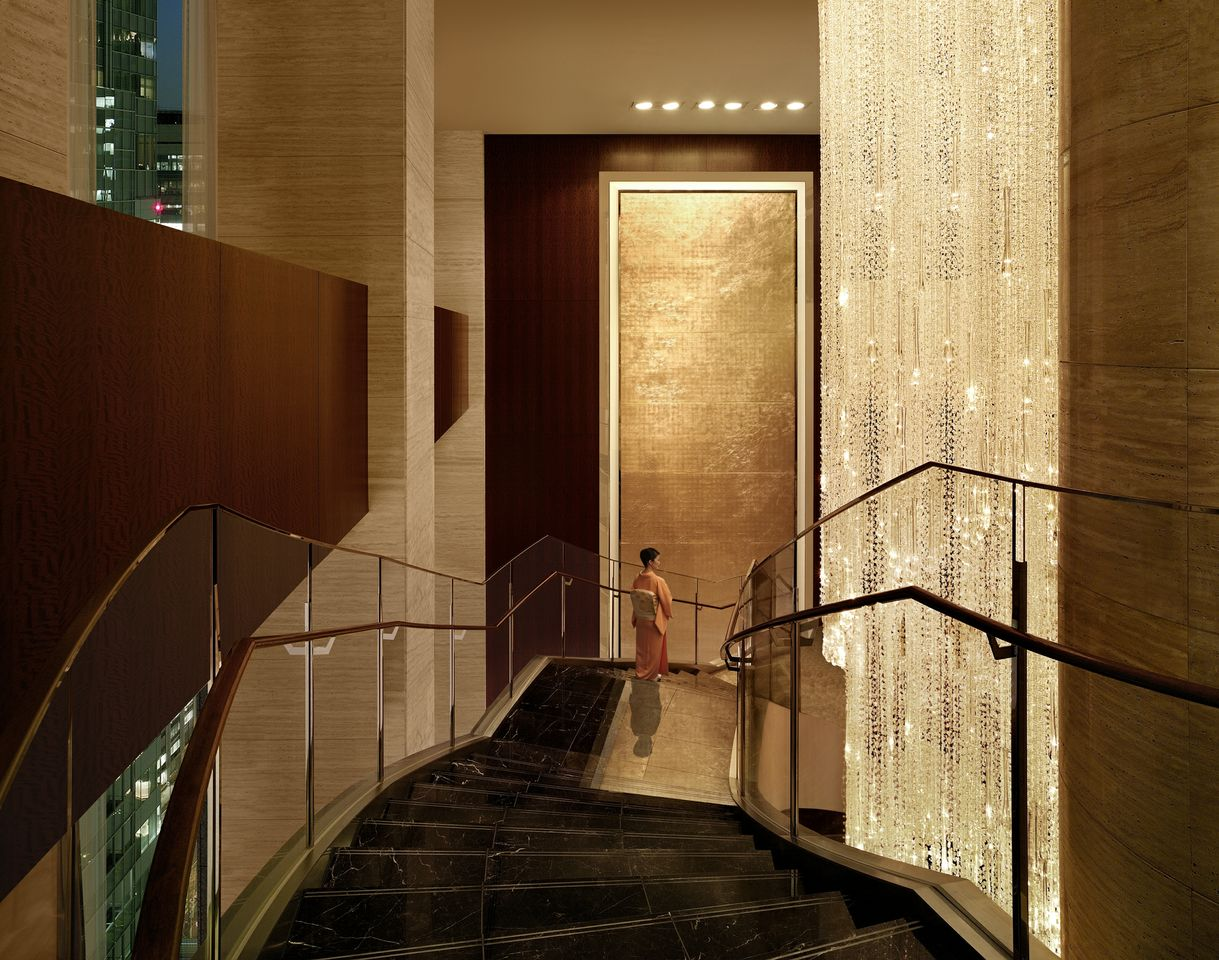
The hotel's central stairway

Most of the hotel's interior was designed by the Hirsch Bedner Associates, whereas select rooms, restaurants, and the hotel's club lounge was designed by Andre Fu of the Hong Kong–based AFSO.

== Notable events ==
In 2011, the hotel hosted a charity concert of the Leipzig String Quartet for the victims of the 2011 Tōhoku earthquake and tsunami. It also hosted the Jacksons, Macy Gray and A.I. for an after-party live event for the Michael Jackson Tribute Show in December 2011.

== Awards ==
- Best New Business Hotel Award – 'Wallpaper magazine (2009)
- Best Luxury Hotel in the World – TripAdvisor's Travelers' Choice Award (2012, 2014)
