= Unique Golden Triangle =

Skyscraper office building in Yongkang District, Tainan, Taiwan

Unique Golden Triangle 良美金三角大樓
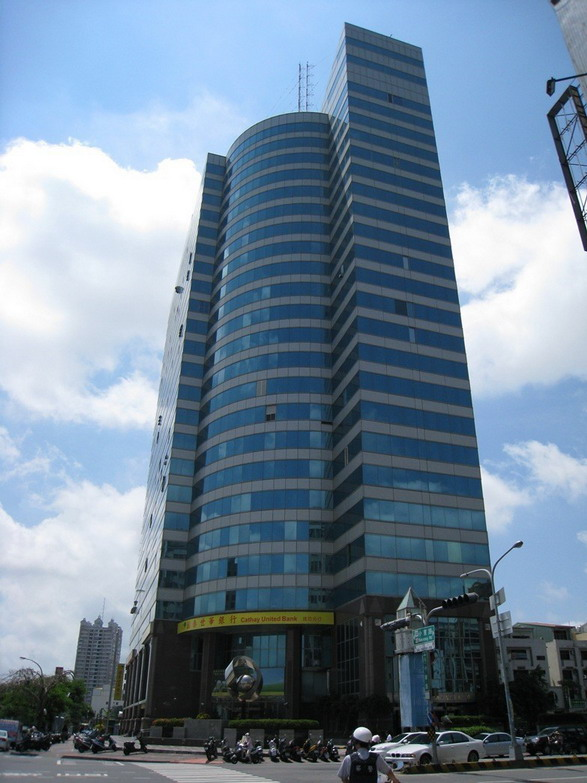
- Interactive map of the Unique Golden Triangle 良美金三角大樓 area

General information
- Status: Completed
- Type: Office building
- Classification: Office
- Location: No. 451, Xiaodong Road, Yongkang District, Tainan, Taiwan
- Coordinates: 22°59′56″N 120°14′4″E
- Completed: 1992

Height
- Roof: 326 ft (99 m)

Technical details
- Floor count: 26
- Lifts/elevators: 8

The Unique Golden Triangle (Chinese: 良美金三角大樓) is a 26-storey, 326 ft (99 m) skyscraper office building in Yongkang District, Tainan, Taiwan, completed in 1992. The building has 3 basement levels and has 8 elevators.

== See also ==
- List of tallest buildings in Asia
- List of tallest buildings in Taiwan
- Shangri-La's Far Eastern Plaza Hotel Tainan
