= Shangri-La Hotels and Resorts =

Hotel chain

Shangri-La Asia Limited
- Type: Public
- Traded as: SEHK: 69; SGX: S07
- ISIN: BMG8063F1068
- Industry: Hospitality
- Founded: 23 April 1971; 55 years ago in Singapore
- Founder: Robert Kuok
- Headquarters: Quarry Bay, Hong Kong
- Number of locations: 101 (as of 2019)
- Area served: Worldwide, except Latin America and Caribbean
- Key people: Kuok Hui-kwong (Chairman & Executive Director); Lim Beng Chee (Executive Director & Group CEO)
- Products: Hotels, resorts
- Revenue: ▲US$2.19 billion (2024)
- Operating income: ▼US$234.9 million (2024)
- Net income: ▼US$182.9 million (2024)
- Total assets: ▲US$13.50 billion (2024)
- Total equity: ▼US$5.44 billion (2024)
- Owner: Kerry Properties
- Website: www.shangri-la.com

Shangri-La International Hotel Management Limited
- Traditional Chinese: 香格里拉國際飯店管理有限公司
- Simplified Chinese: 香格里拉国际饭店管理有限公司
Transcriptions
Standard Mandarin
- Hanyu Pinyin: Xiānggélǐlā Guójì Fàndiàn Guǎnlǐ Yǒuxiàngōngsī
Yue: Cantonese
- Jyutping: hoeng1 gaak3 lei5 laai1 gwok3 zai3 faan6 dim3 gun2 lei5 jau5 haan6 gung1 si1

Shangri-La Hotels and Resorts
- Chinese: 香格里拉酒店
Transcriptions
Standard Mandarin
- Hanyu Pinyin: Xiānggélǐlā Jiǔdiàn
Yue: Cantonese
- Jyutping: hoeng1 gaak3 lei5 laai1 zau2 dim3

Shangri-La Hotels and Resorts (Chinese: 香格里拉酒店) is a multinational hospitality company, founded in 1971 by tycoon Robert Kuok and bearing the name of Shangri-La, a Far Eastern mythical land of contentment depicted in the 1933 novel Lost Horizon. It is a subsidiary of Kerry Properties, the company has over 100 luxury hotels and resorts with over 40,000 rooms in Africa, Asia, Europe, the Middle East, North America and Oceania.

Shangri-La has 4 brands across different market segments: Shangri-La, Traders Hotels, Kerry Hotels, and Hotel Jen. The company's head office is in Kerry Centre (嘉里中心), Quarry Bay, Hong Kong. The current chairman is Kuok Hui-kwong.

== History ==
The first hotel of the luxury Shangri-La Hotels and Resorts Group was the Shangri-La Hotel Singapore, opened on 23 April 1971. The name derives from the mythical place Shangri-La, described in the 1933 novel Lost Horizon by British author James Hilton.

The Shangri-La Hotel Singapore was managed by Westin Hotels & Resorts, until Shangri-La International Hotel Management Limited was founded in 1979, and management of the Singapore Shangri-La was taken back over from Westin in 1984. However, it would not be until 1991 that Shangri-La assumed control of the rest of the hotels.

This hotel has also become the host to a prominent inter-governmental security conference known as the Shangri-La Dialogue.

== Corporate affairs ==
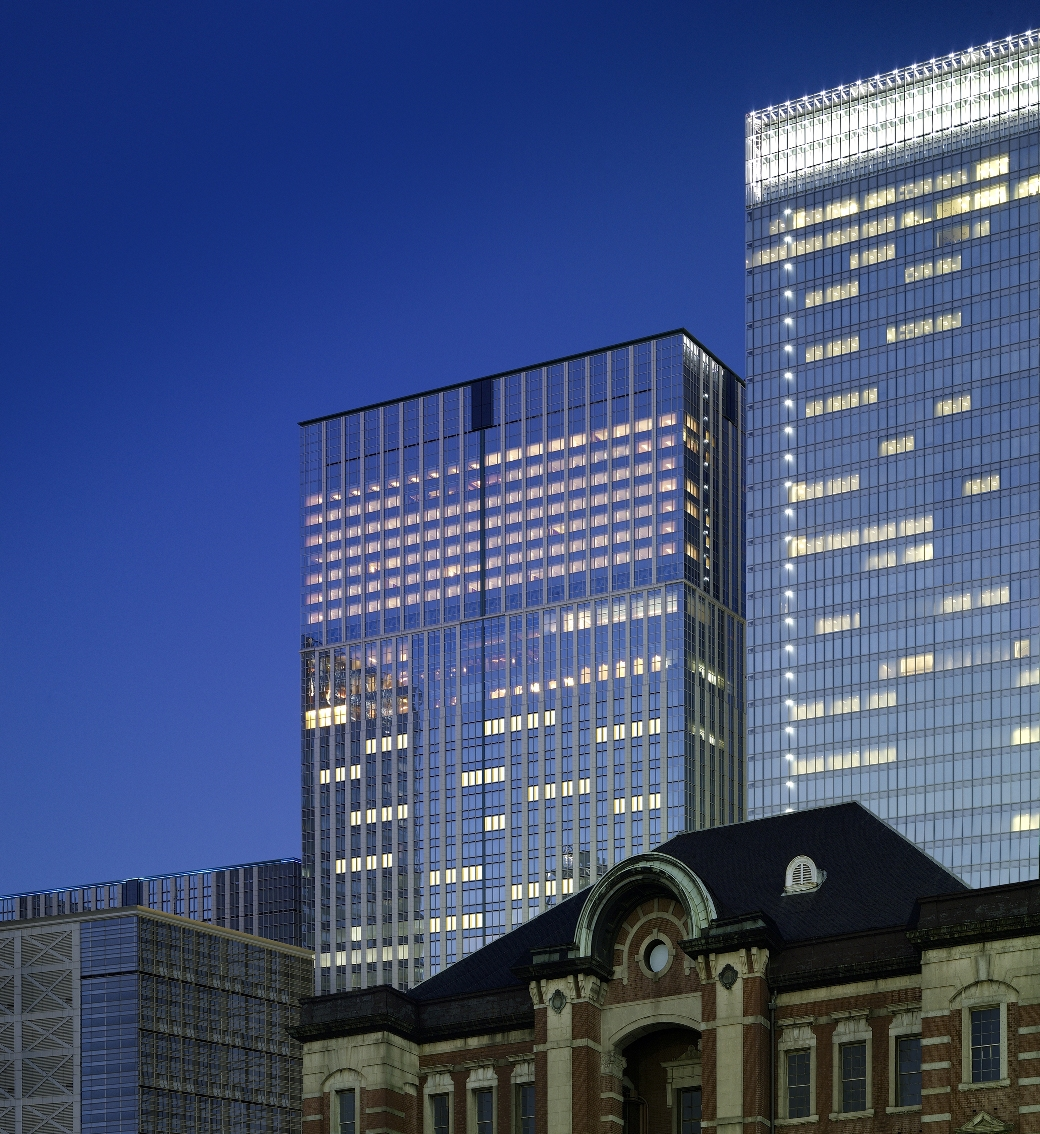
Shangri-La Hotel, Tokyo

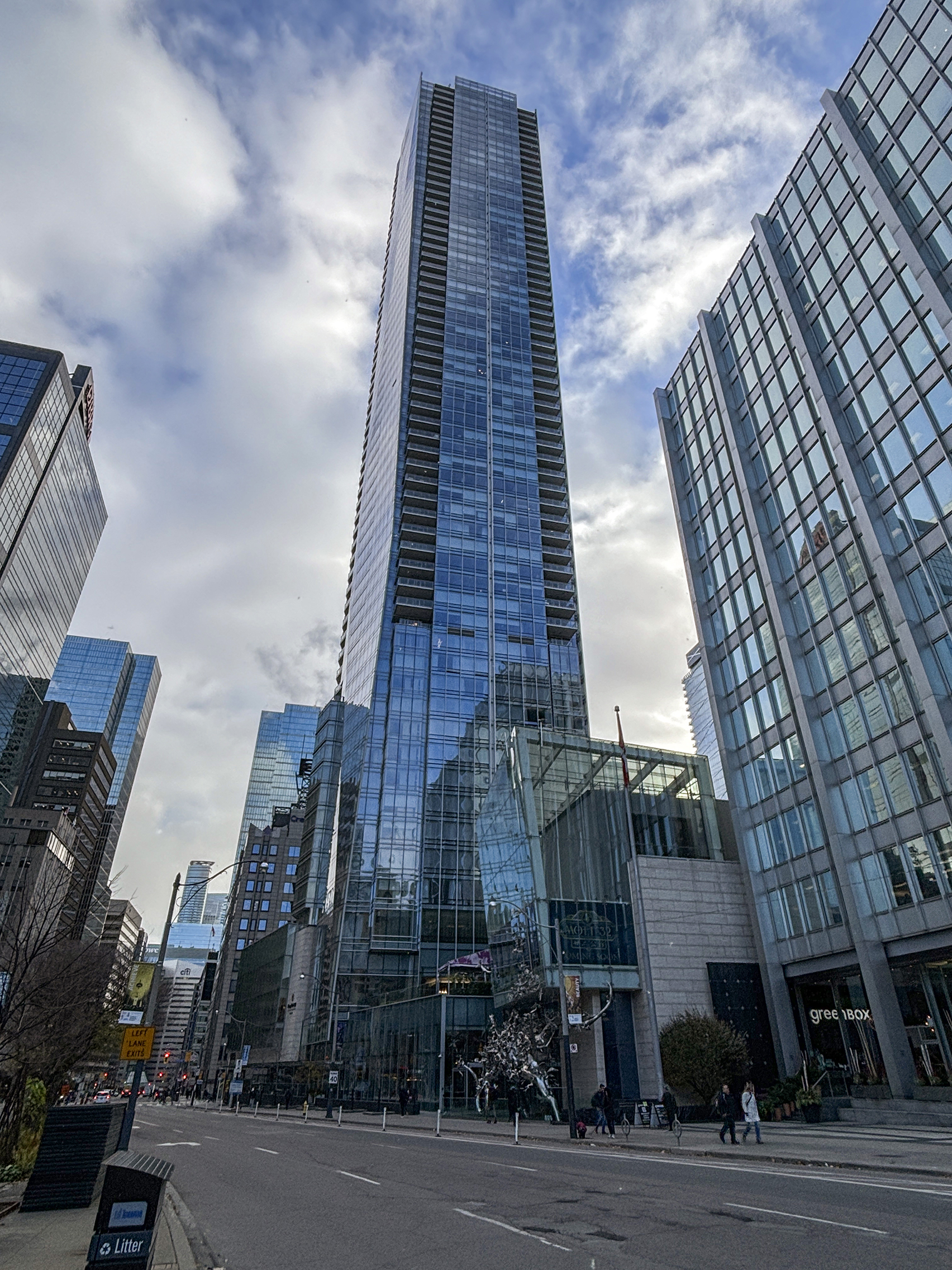
Shangri-La Toronto

=== Subsidiaries ===
- Shangri-La Asia Limited is incorporated in Bermuda with limited liability. It is primarily listed on the Stock Exchange of Hong Kong Limited (stock code 00069) with a secondary listing on the Singapore Exchange Securities Trading Limited (stock code Shang Asia 2kHK$) and with American Depositary Receipt traded as SHALY. Since 1997, Shangri-La Asia Limited has owned Shangri-La International Hotel Management Limited.
- Shangri-La Hotels (Malaysia) Berhad is incorporated in Malaysia with limited liability and is traded on the Bursa Malaysia Securities Berhad (MYX: 5517). As of 31 December 2025, Shangri-La Asia Limited holds 52.78% of Shangri-La Hotels (Malaysia) Berhad.
- Shangri-La Hotel Public Company Limited is incorporated in Thailand with limited liability and is traded on the Stock Exchange of Thailand (SET: SHANG). As of 31 December 2025, Shangri-La Asia Limited holds 73.61% of Shangri-La Hotel Public Company Limited.

=== Properties ===
As of March 2022, Shangri-La owns, operates, or manages 100 hotels in 77 destinations:

Brand	No. of properties
Shangri-La	91
Hotel Jen	9
Kerry Hotels	3
Traders	2
China World	2
Total	107

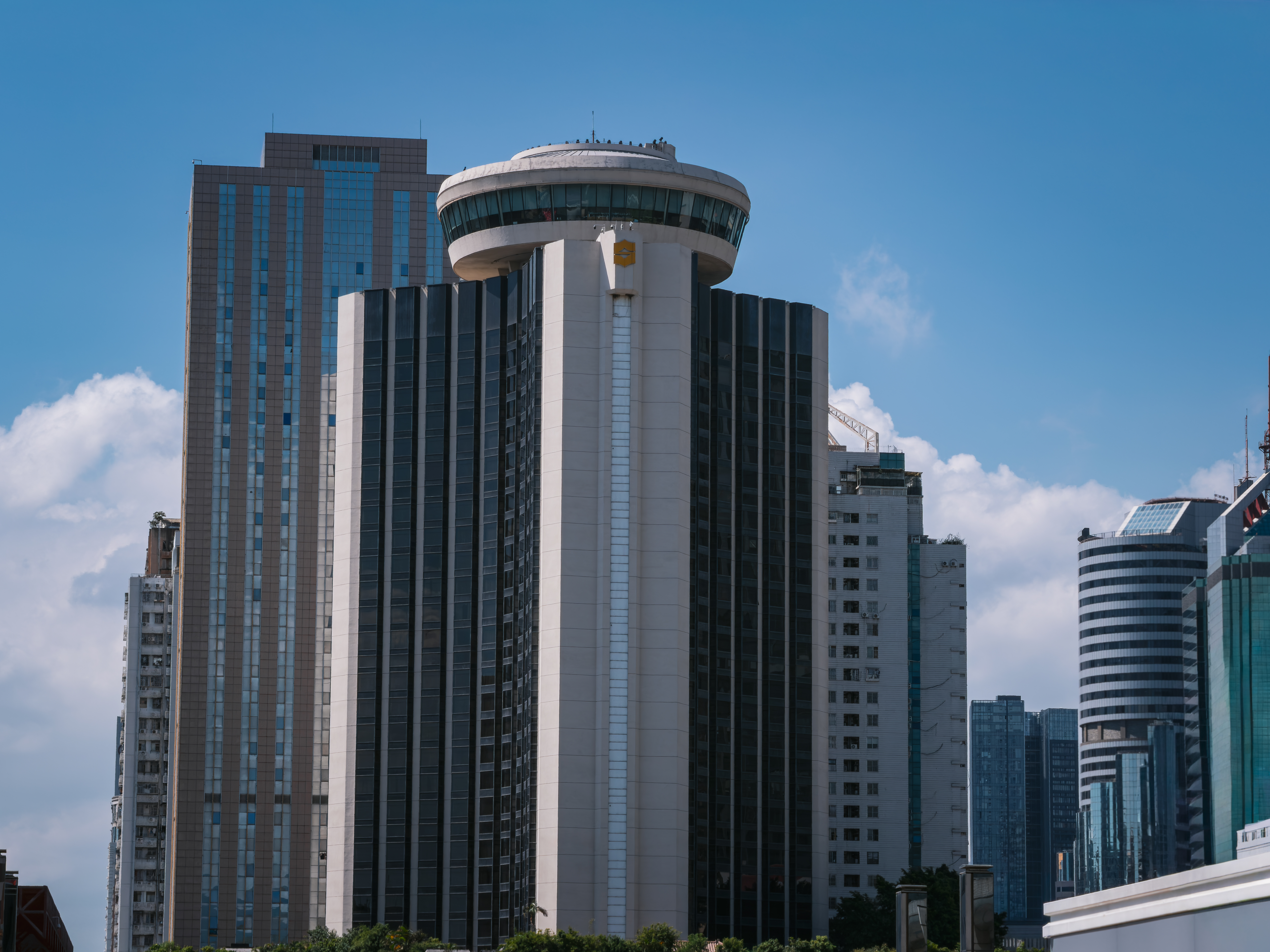
Shangri-La Hotel, Shenzhen

== Senior leadership ==
- Group Chairman: Kuok Hui-kwong (since January 2017)
- Group CEO: Kuok Hui-kwong (since August 2025)

=== Former chairmen ===
1. Robert Kuok (1984–1993)
2. Pho Ba Quan (1993–1994)
3. Richard Liu (1994–1997)
4. Beau Kuok Khoon-chen (1997–2000)
5. Alex Ye (2000–2003)
6. Edward Kuok Khoon-loong (2003–2008)
7. Kuok Khoon-ean (2008–2013)
8. Beau Kuok Khoon-chen (2013–2017); second term

=== Former chief executives ===
1. Robert Kuok (1984–1993)
2. Pho Ba Quan (1993–1994)
3. Paul Bush (1994–1997)
4. Chye Kuok Khoon-ho (1997–2002)
5. Edward Kuok Khoon-loong (2008–2009)
6. Kuok Khoon-ean (2009–2013)
7. Beau Kuok Khoon-chen (2013–2017)
8. Lim Beng Chee (2017–2022)

== Notable Properties ==
- Shangri-La London
- Shangri-La Toronto

== Former Properties ==
- Shangri-La Bengaluru
- Shangri-La Vancouver

== See also ==
- Kerry Properties
- Robert Kuok
