= List of most expensive buildings =

In the following, a building is defined as a structure with a roof and walls that stands permanently in one place. Airports are excluded as their construction cost includes runways and systems; however, terminal buildings are included in the list.

Indicates buildings still under construction that have been architecturally topped out but not yet fully opened

Building	City	Country	Architect/designer	Current owner(s)	Completed/ will complete	Nominal cost ($USbillion)	Inflation-adjusted cost, 2021 ($USbillion)
Hinkley Point C nuclear power station	Somerset	United Kingdom		EDF Energy	2027	40.0	
Plant Vogtle (Units 3 & 4)	Waynesboro, Georgia	United States		Georgia Power, Southern Company	2023	30.00	
The Great Mosque of Mecca or Masjid al-Haram (Expansion Project)	Mecca	Saudi Arabia	KSA	Government of Saudi Arabia	2025	26.6	
ITER	Saint-Paul-lès-Durance	France	Bernard Bigot	ITER	2025	25.00	
Flamanville 3	Flamanville	France			2023	21.93	
Akkuyu Nuclear Plant	Mersin	Turkey	Denis Sezemin	Akkuyu Nuclear Power Plant	2023	20.00	
Abraj Al Bait	Mecca	Saudi Arabia	Saudi Binladin Group	Government of Saudi Arabia	2012	16.00	18.89
Rooppur Nuclear Power Plant	Pabna	Bangladesh		Bangladesh Atomic Energy Commission	2025	12.65	
Olkiluoto 3	Eurajoki	Finland	Areva	Teollisuuden Voima	2023	12.4	12.4
Mochovce Nuclear Power Plant (block 3 & 4)	Mochovce	Slovakia	Slovenské elektrárne	Slovenské elektrárne	2023	7.61	8.00
International Finance Centre	Hong Kong	Hong Kong SAR	Pelli Clarke Pelli Architects	Sun Hung Kai Properties, Henderson Land Development, Towngas	2003	6.4	9.43
Regjeringskvartalet	Oslo	Norway	Erling Viksjø	Statsbygg	2026	5.75	5.75
SoFi Stadium	Inglewood	United States	HKS	Kroenke Sports & Entertainment	2020	5.5	5.94
Marina Bay Sands	Singapore	Singapore	Moshe Safdie	Las Vegas Sands	2010	5.5	6.83
Marina One	Singapore	Singapore	Ingenhoven Architects	Khazanah Nasional Berhad, Temasek Holdings	2017	5.32	5.88
Apple Park	Cupertino, California	United States	Foster and Partners	Apple Inc.	2017	5.0	5.72
Grand Lisboa Palace	Cotai	Macau	WATG	SJM Holdings	2021	5.0	5.0
Resorts World Sentosa	Singapore	Singapore	Michael Graves	Genting Group	2010	4.93	6.13
Wynn Palace	Cotai	Macau	Butler/Ashworth Architects and Wong & Ouyang	Wynn Resorts	2016	4.2	5.22
The Cosmopolitan	Las Vegas	United States	Friedmutter Group with Arquitectonica	The Blackstone Group	2010	4.1	5.09
Asia Square	Singapore	Singapore	Denton Corker Marshall with Architects61	CapitaLand Integrated Commercial Trust, Qatar Investment Authority	2013	4.06	4.49
One Bangkok	Bangkok	Thailand	SOM, A49, KPF, Lead8	TCC Assets(Thailand), Frasers Property(Thailand)	2030	3.9	
Suntec City	Singapore	Singapore	I. M. Pei with DP Architects and Tsao & McKown Architects	Suntec REIT	1997	3.81	3.81
One World Trade Center	New York City	United States	Skidmore, Owings & Merrill	The Port Authority of New York and New Jersey	2012	3.8	4.49
New Stadium at RFK Campus	Washington, D.C.	United States	HKS	Washington, D.C.	2030	3.8	
One Vanderbilt	New York City	United States	Kohn Pedersen Fox	SL Green Realty, National Pension Service of Korea, Hines Interests Limited Partnership, Mori Building Company	2020	3.31	
Marina Bay Financial Centre	Singapore	Singapore	Kohn Pedersen Fox with DCA Architects	Hongkong Land, Keppel REIT, Suntec REIT, DBS Bank	2012	3.21	3.99
Lotte World Tower	Seoul	South Korea	James von Klemperer	Lotte Corporation	2016	3.11	4.31
Central Park Tower	New York City	United States	Adrian Smith + Gordon Gill Architecture	Extell Development Company and Shanghai Municipal Investment Group	2020	3.00	3.88
Emirates Palace	Abu Dhabi	United Arab Emirates	John Elliott	Abu Dhabi Government	2005	3.00	4.16
Palace of the Parliament	Bucharest	Romania	Anca Petrescu	Romanian Government	1997	3.00	5.06
Wynn Resort	Las Vegas	United States	Butler/Ashworth Architects and Jerde Partnership	Wynn Resorts	2005	2.70	5.13
Central Boulevard Towers	Singapore	Singapore	CallisonRTKL with Architects61	IOI Group	2023	2.52	2.64
Venetian Macau	Macau	Macau	Aedas	Las Vegas Sands	2005	2.4	3.33
City of Dreams	Macau	Macau	Arquitectonica	Melco Crown Entertainment	2009	2.40	3.03
Antilia	Mumbai	India	Perkins and Will and Hirsch Bedner Associates	Mukesh Ambani	2010	2.6	3.23
Raffles City	Singapore	Singapore	I. M. Pei, Architects61	CapitaLand	1986	2.35	2.46
Guoco Tower	Singapore	Singapore	Skidmore, Owings & Merrill with Architects61	Guoco Group	2016	2.27	2.56
National Children's Hospital	Dublin	Ireland	Benedict Zucchi	Children's Health Ireland	2026	2.2	
Comcentre	Singapore	Singapore	Kohn Pedersen Fox	Singtel	2028	2.19	2.19
Marina Square Complex	Singapore	Singapore	John Portman & Associates	UOL Group, Mandarin Oriental Hotel Group	1986	2.17	2.17
Royal Adelaide Hospital	Adelaide	Australia	Silver Thomas Hanley & DesignInc	Government of South Australia	2017	2.1	
Taipei 101	Taipei	Taiwan	C.Y. Lee & Partners	Taipei Financial Center Corporation	2004	1.80	2.58
The Palazzo	Las Vegas	United States	HKS	Las Vegas Sands	2007	1.80	2.35
Guoco Midtown	Singapore	Singapore	Denton Corker Marshall	Guoco Group	2024	1.77	1.88
Lakhta Center	Saint Petersburg	Russia	RMJM (until 2011), Gorproject	Gazprom Neft	2018	1.77	2.09
South Beach	Singapore	Singapore	Foster + Partners	Allianz Real Estate, Gaw Capital, Hoi Hup Realty	2016	1.75	2.29
Camp Nou	Barcelona	Spain	Francesc Mitjans and Josep Soteras	FC Barcelona	2018	1.73	1.87
Nya Karolinska Hospital	Stockholm	Sweden	Whitearkitekter & White Tengbom team	Region Stockholm	2018	2.4 (23 B SEK)	2.42
Crown Sydney	Sydney	Australia	WilkinsonEyre	Crown Resorts	2020	1.68	1.72
Kemi Bio Product Factory (Kemin biotuotetehdas)	Kemi	Finland	Metsä Group	Metsä Fibre	2023	1.68	1.72
Queensland Children's Hospital	Brisbane	Australia	Conrad Gargett	Queensland Government	2014	1.59 (2.2 AU$)	1.82
Bellagio	Las Vegas	United States	DeRuyter Butler and Atlandia Design	Bellagio (MGM Resorts International is the owner of the company)	1998	1.60	2.66
Seat of the ECB	Frankfurt	Germany	Coop Himmelb(l)au	European Central Bank	2013	1.57	1.83
Ocean Financial Centre	Singapore	Singapore	César Pelli	Keppel REIT	2011	1.53	1.53
DUO	Singapore	Singapore	Ole Scheeren	Allianz Real Estate, Gaw Capital, Hoi Hup Realty	2018	1.5	1.59
Wembley Stadium	London	United Kingdom	Foster and Partners	The Football Association	2006	1.50	2.02
Yankee Stadium	New York City	United States	Populous	New York City Industrial Development Agency	2009	1.50	1.89
Termoelektrarna Šoštanj blok 6	Šoštanj	Slovenia	n.a.	Government of Slovenia	2014	1.6	1.83
Burj Khalifa	Dubai	United Arab Emirates	Skidmore, Owings, & Merrill	Emaar Properties	2010	1.5	1.86
The One	Toronto	Canada	Foster and Partners, Core Architects	Mizrahi Developments	2027	1.4	
CapitaSpring	Singapore	Singapore	Bjarke Ingels Group, Carlo Ratti	CapitaLand	2021	1.35	1.35
Skywaters Residences	Singapore	Singapore	Skidmore, Owings & Merrill	Perennial Holdings	2028	1.24	1.24
Frasers Tower	Singapore	Singapore	DP Architects	Frasers Property, National Pension Service	2018	1.45	1.54
Gigafactory 1	Storey County, Nevada	United States	HOK, Bennett Wagner & Grody Architects, RMH Group, Rocky Mountain Institute, Mortenson Construction, and CH2M HILL	Tesla, Inc.	2020	1.31	1.5
Äänekoski Bio Product Factory (Äänekosken biotuotetehdas)	Äänekoski	Finland		Metsä Group	2017	1.33 (1.2B€)	1.47
Mall of Tripla	Helsinki	Finland	Arkkitehdit Soini & Horto	YIT, Ilmarinen	2019	1.33 (1.1 B€)	1.39
181 Mercer Street	New York	United States	Davis Brody Bond	New York University	2023	1.285	1.45
Jewel Changi Airport (mixed-use building)	Singapore	Singapore	Moshe Safdie	Changi Airport Group	2019	1.26	1.42
Comcast Technology Center	Philadelphia	United States	Foster and Partners	Comcast	2018	1.5	1.62
Merdeka 118	Kuala Lumpur	Malaysia	Fender Katsalidis in association with RSP KL	PNB Merdeka Ventures Sdn Bhd	2023	1.21	
City of Dreams Sri Lanka	Colombo	Sri Lanka	Cecil Balmond	John Keells Holdings	2024	1.2	1.2
Petronas Twin Towers	Kuala Lumpur	Malaysia	César Pelli	KLCC Holdings	1999	1.16	1.89
CapitaGreen	Singapore	Singapore	Toyo Ito	CapitaLand	2014	1.11	1.31
Parliament House	Canberra	Australia	Romaldo Giurgola	Parliament of Australia	1988	1.1	2.62
Bełchatów Power Station 858 MW unit	Bełchatów	Poland		Pge	2011	1.29	1.55

== See also ==
- Megaproject
- List of megaprojects
- List of largest buildings
- List of tallest buildings
- List of largest hotels
