= Kristin Frey =

Personal information
- Nationality: American
- Born: January 11, 1984 (age 42) Illinois

Sport
- Sport: Tower running, Stair climbing, Marathon running

Kristin Frey (born January 11, 1984, in Des Plaines, Illinois) is an elite US stair climber and tower runner who also competes in road races ranging from 5k to the marathon and ultramarathons.

Kristin began competing in tower running in 2010, when she did Hustle Up the Hancock for the first time. Since then, she has climbed all of the major towers in Chicago. In 2012, Kristin set the course record of 10:49 at the Step Up for Kids Climb held at the Aon Center in Chicago. That same year, she won Hustle Up the Hancock with a time of 10:56. She has participated in the prestigious Empire State Building Run-Up in NYC where she placed 4th in 2013. Kristin has also completed several other tower races around the US including the Stratosphere in Las Vegas, the Aon Building in Los Angeles, and multiple towers in Seattle. She also participated in tower races in Bogota, Colombia for the Towerrunning World Cup Championships and in São Paulo, Brazil for the Vertical World Circuit Championship, where she placed 2nd. Other international races include races in Basel, Switzerland, Vienna, Austria, and Taipei, Taiwan; she finished in the top 3 at all races.

Despite being ranked number two in the world among women tower runners in 2011, Frey could not find a sponsor.

== Athletic career ==
=== Stair running ===
- 2010: 8th place Hancock Center, Chicago, IL
- 2010: 1st place US Bank, Milwaukee, WI
- 2010: 1st place Presidential Towers, Chicago, IL (single climb), 3rd (4 tower climb)
- 2010: 1st place AON Center, Los Angeles, CA
- 2010: 1st place Bellevue Towers, Seattle, WA
- 2010: 3rd place Willis (Sears) Tower, Chicago, IL
- 2010: 2nd place 300 N. LaSalle, Chicago, IL
- 2011: 2nd place AON Center, Chicago, IL
- 2011: 7th place Empire State Building, New York, NY
- 2011: 1st place Oakbrook Terrace, Oakbrook, IL
- 2011: 1st place Hilton, Springfield, IL
- 2011: 3rd place Hancock Center, Chicago, IL
- 2011: 1st place US Bank, Milwaukee, WI
- 2011: 2nd place Presidential Towers, Chicago, IL (single climb), 3rd (4 tower climb)
- 2011: 2nd place AON Center, Los Angeles, CA
- 2011: 2nd place 2 Union Square, Seattle, WA
- 2011: 2nd place Willis (Sears) Tower, Chicago, IL
- 2011: 6th place Colpatria, Bogota, Colombia
- 2011: 1st place 300 N. LaSalle, Chicago, IL
- 2012: 2nd place Abril Tower, São Paulo Brazil
- 2012: 1st place AON Center, Chicago, IL
- 2012: 5th place Empire State Building, New York, NY
- 2012: 2nd place Hilton, Springfield, IL (single climb)
- 2012: 1st place Hancock Center, Chicago, IL
- 2012: 2nd place Stratosphere, Las Vegas, NV
- 2012: 1st place Presidential Towers, Chicago, IL (4 tower climb)
- 2012: 1st place AON Center, Los Angeles, CA
- 2012: 3rd place Ramada, Basel, Switzerland
- 2012: 2nd place Taipei 101 Run Up, Taipei, Taiwan
- 2012: 2nd place Millennium Tower (Extreme), Vienna, Austria
- 2012: 1st place female (5th overall) Willis (Sears) Tower, Chicago, IL
- 2013: 1st place female AON Center, Chicago, IL
- 2013: 4th place Empire State Building, New York, NY
- 2013: 1st place overall Oakbrook Terrace, Oakbrook, IL (powerhour)
- 2013: 1st place Hancock Center, Chicago, IL
- 2013: 2nd place US Stairclimbing Championships, Stratosphere, Las Vegas, NV
- 2013: 1st place Presidential Towers, Chicago, IL (4 tower climb)
- 2013: 1st place Big Climb, Seattle, WA

=== Marathon running ===
- 2005: Chicago Marathon 3:41:30
- 2006: Chicago Marathon 3:37:12
- 2007: Chicago Marathon 3:49:54
- 2007: Boston Marathon 3:38:09
- 2008: Chicago Marathon 3:17:00
- 2008: Boston Marathon 3:28:06
- 2008: Disney Marathon 3:28:40
- 2009: New York Marathon 3:26:26
- 2009: Chicago Marathon 3:14:26
- 2009: St. Louis Marathon 3:21:57
- 2009: Arizona Rock N Roll Marathon 3:23:33
- 2010: Chicago Marathon 3:19:00
- 2013: Marquette Marathon 3:32

=== Ultramarathon Running ===
- 2013: Des Plaines River Trail 50 Miler - 8:16 (6th overall female)
- 2014: Crystal Springs Trail Run 50k - 6:03
- 2014: Ice Age Trail 50 Miler - 8:49 (10th overall female)
