= Apple Taipei 101 =

- Apple 台北101
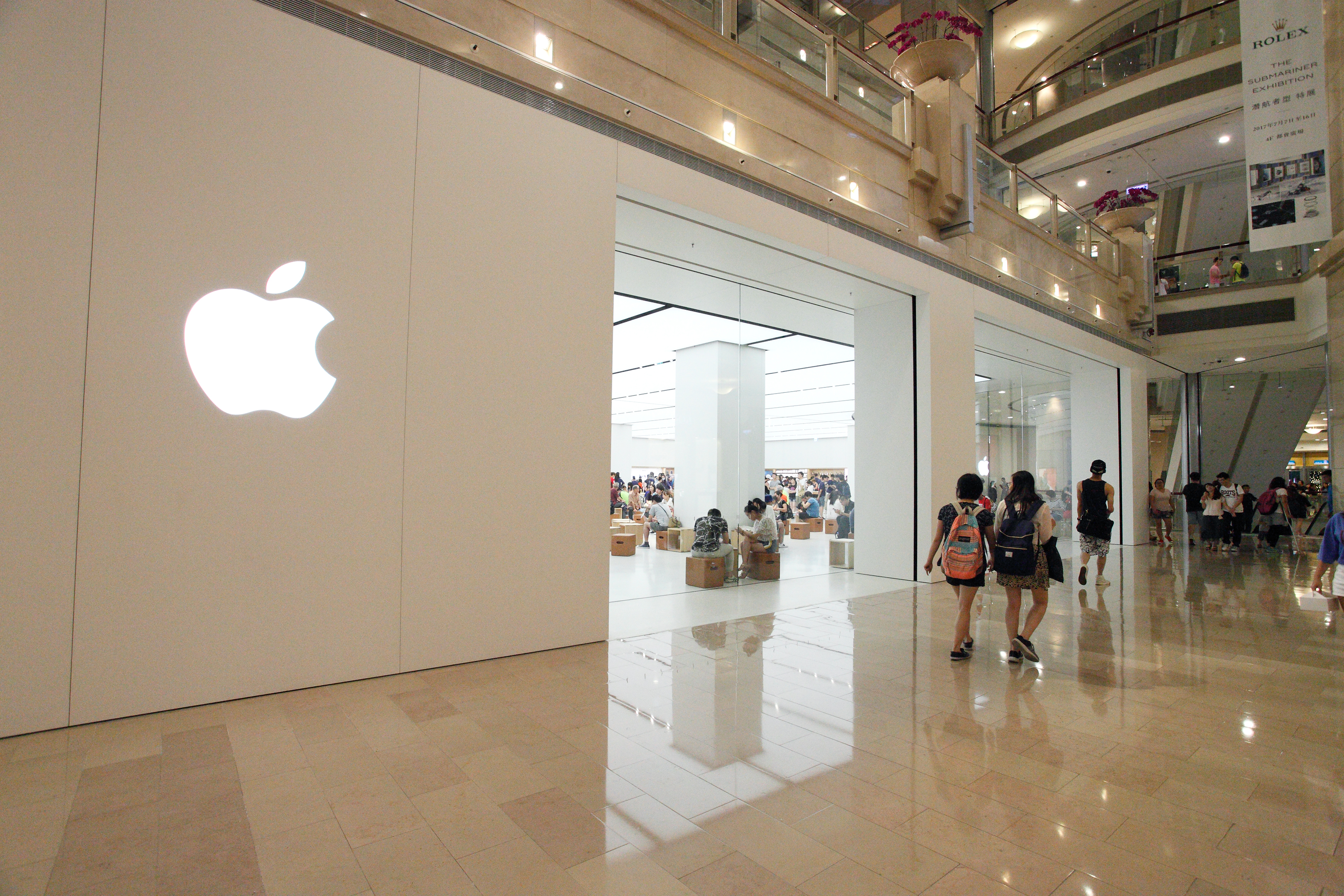

General information
- Location: 45, Sifu Road, Xinyi District, Taipei, Taiwan
- Opened: July 1, 2017; 9 years ago

Technical details
- Floor count: 1
- Floor area: 1,322 m2

Website
- https://www.apple.com/tw/retail/taipei101/

Apple Taipei 101 (Chinese: Apple台北101) is an Apple Store in Xinyi District, Taipei, Taiwan. It is in the first floor of Taipei 101, a skyscraper in the city. Established on 1 July, 2017, it is the first Apple Store in Taiwan, and the 497th Apple Store in the world. The area is approximately 400 ping (approximately 1,322 m2).

The store's designation concept are "street corner" for glass windows connecting outside, and "long corridor" for light boxes surrounding the store. It provides serveral services such as experiencing Apple products, Today at Apple, and Genius Bar.

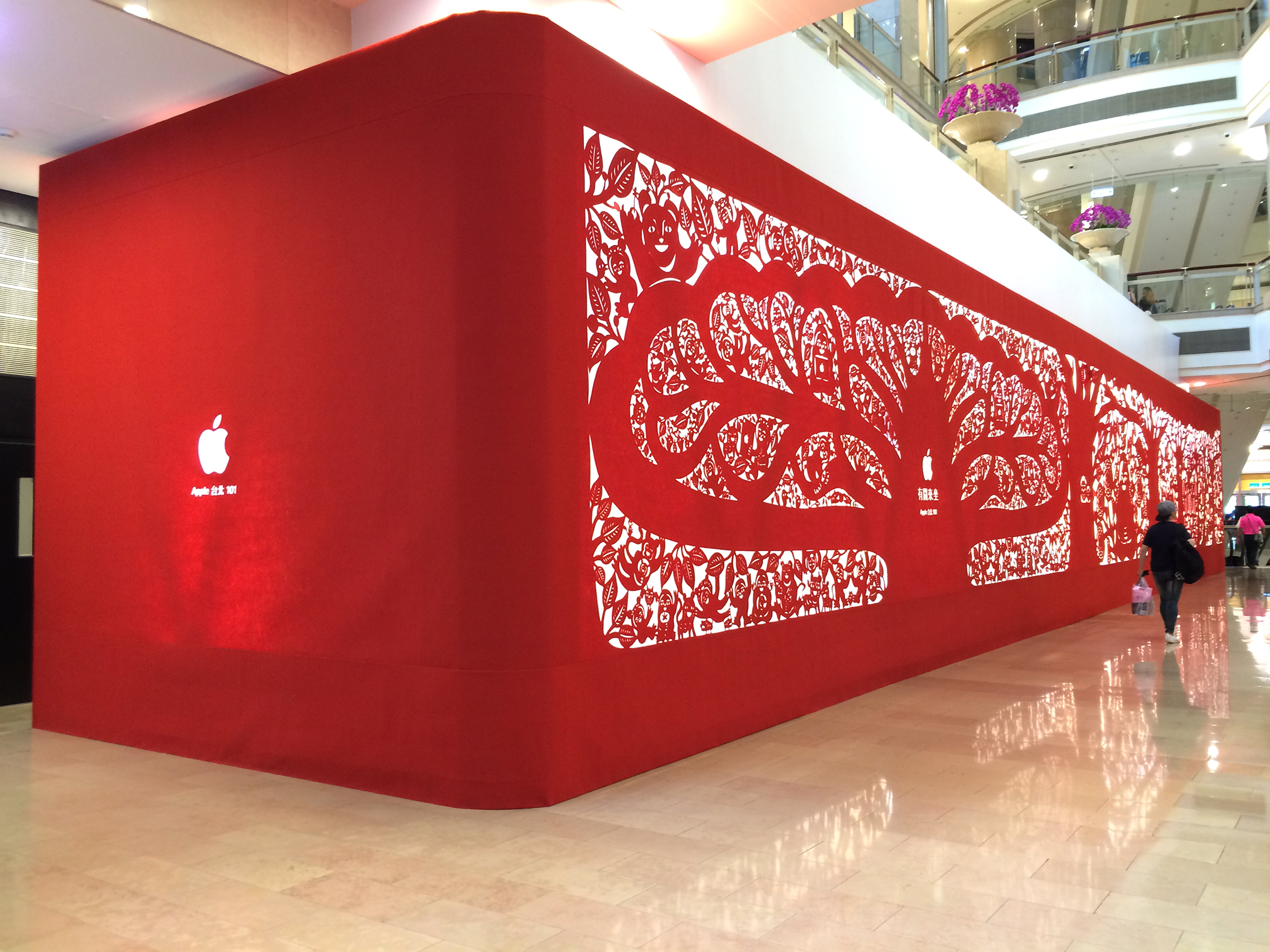
Ū-îng lâi-tsē by Yang Shi-Yi, photographed on 16 June, 2017

An artwork, Ū-îng lâi-tsē (ū-îng lâi-tsē, '有空來坐'), was featured when the store established. With its length of 75 metres, it was the largest cutting paper artwork in the world. The artwork was made by Yang Shi-Yi (Chinese: 楊士毅), a Taiwanese artist, with 60 people and cost three months. It was removed on 27 June 2017.

== See also ==
- Apple Store
- Apple Park
- Apple Xinyi A13
