= Ariel Moscovici =

French sculptor

Ariel Moscovici (born 1956, Bucharest, Romania) is a sculptor born in Romania and based in France.

== Works ==
His drawings and sculptures have appeared in France at Salons de Mai, Grands et Jeunes d'aujourd'hui, Salon des Réalités Nouvelles, 33rd Salon de la Jeune Sculpture, 3Oth Salon de Montrouge, and others. Internationally, his work has been the subject of exhibits and installations in Andorra, Spain, Belgium, Germany, Luxembourg, Korea, Taiwan and Japan. Moscovici works have been awarded first prize at the Biennale Internationale de Sculpture Contemporaine, Collioure and purchase awards from the Taipei Fine Arts Museum in Taiwan. Moscovici's public art work Between Sky and Earth, was installed at Taipei 101 in 2003.

Born in Bucharest, Romania, Moscovici graduated in 1979 from L'École nationale supérieure des Beaux-Arts (ENSBA) in Paris. He now lives at Montbel, in the south of France. He is married to French sculptor Sylvie Rivillon.

== Style ==
Moscovici, normally reluctant to discuss art in words, has in recent years offered a few written comments for exhibit programs. His remarks include the following observations.

In my work I use mostly what may be called classical materials (stone, wood, clay, bronze, metal. etc.) because these are almost abstract and amorphous. Their identity resides mainly in their structure (except for metal). This allows me to model them the way I want while respecting their character.

I want to realize what I call "inhabited forms"--forms that contain energy, as if they could breathe and live by themselves. This is a personal attitude of mine, both classical and modern, as I don't wish to be part of any official fashion or artistic movement.

My subjects have no clear borders. They are connected to each other. My basic themes: nature; landscapes that accommodate and oppose human creation; an architecture of the "spirit"; skeletons and enveloping skin; the evocation of a feeling or a sound or a privileged location; landscapes with flat areas and mountains, rough or modelled, with erosion that is natural or artificial, accomplished by nature or man.

I am lately working on a series of variations on a theme. In Between Three Points [2000] I explored the idea of reading a sculpture in time, as in a work of music. The work is built from three pieces that... tell the story of the creation of a form in three chapters: (1) the beginning, birth, or underground level, (2) the initiation, or earth ground level, and (3) the rebirth or result tending toward the sky. The form is not completely free to grow as it will, but is constrained and guided by internal tectonic pressures and external atmospheric pressures. The sculpture can be read in two directions at the same time: horizontally between the three parts and vertically between the ground and the sky....

In Between Earth and Sky [2002] the idea is the same but expressed more in the vertical direction. We have axels between two points, places where passage can take place. The axels stand as almost human figures between the matter and spirit, between the underground (hell) and the sky....

The surface of my forms is worked in the same way: smooth areas in opposition to rough ones and simple, almost geometrical, forms facing multifaceted, chaotic accumulations of shapes. Simplicity strikes me as dangerous. It's wrong to try to understand things by eliminating the details instead of understanding the whole in its complexity. I think the details create the whole.

Moscovici's images, though modern, may be described as postmodernist in the sense that they are more archetypal than abstract. Raymond Crampagne describes their effect in a publication by the Chateau le Puget Art Gallery:

The works are not a reflection of geometrical forms in a timeless space. They have a temporal dimension relating not to history or mythology but to a world that existed before both; even so, this world forms the essence of both history and myth. This is a world constantly engaged in struggle. The protagonists in the conflict, humanity and nature, operate in a world of opposites: smooth and rough, gloss and matte, geometrical and irregular, concave and convex, straight and curved, round and square, polished and rough, full and empty, imprint and excrescence, horizontal and vertical, mass and surface. For Moscovici this conjunction of opposites is characteristic of our species' relationship with nature. Though we are ourselves part of nature, we exert our will over matter and impose our own vision, eventually transforming nature to reflect our innermost being.

Like Rimbaud seeking to write the silences, seize the inexpressible, and freeze whirlwinds, Moscovici seeks to translate into images the fundamental rhythms of existence and the mysteries of nature....

Moscovici displays a profound humanism whose expression is anything but extravagant. The means are simple. The eye and the spirit are called inward. ... Here one is facing an uninhabited habitat, a dwelling lacking practical purpose. Only the eye of the beholder will enter and find refuge and, in solitude, dream of habitation.

(Translation: Robert Drew, Jacques Carrio, Alton Thompson)

== Installations and exhibits ==
One-Artist Shows

1985

- Galerie du Haut-Pavé, Paris, France
- The International Art Fair, Lahumière gallery, Basel, Switzerland

Maison de la Culture, Courbevoie, France

1986

- Galerie du Soir, Paris, France

1987

- Espace Gambetta, Carcassonne, France
- MAC 2000, Grand Palais, Paris, France

1989

- Galerie d'Art Contemporain, Chamalières, France

1990

- Pierre-Marie Vitoux Gallery, Paris, France
- Espace Gauthier, Narbonne, France

1991

- SAGA (International Multiple Art Fair), Triskel Gallery, Paris, France
- LINEART, International Art Fair, Ghent (Belgium), Triskel Gallery, Ghent, Belgium

1992

- Naito gallery, Nagoya, Japan
- Pierre-Marie Vitoux gallery, Paris, France
- SAGA (International Multiple Art Fair), Pierre-Marie Vitoux Gallery, Paris, France
- Espace Cardin, Triskel Gallery, Paris, France
- MAC 2000, Grand Palais, Paris, France

1993

- Era Bauro Gallery, Andorra
- Michele Guerin Gallery, Limetz, France

1994

- TRISKEL Gallery, LINEART International Art Fair, Gent, Belgium
- Michele Guerin Gallery, Bonnières, France

1995

- SAGA (Internationale Multiple Art Fair), Michel Guerin Gallery, Paris, France
- Pierre Marie Vitoux Gallery, Paris, France

1996

- SAGA (International Multiple Art Fair), Michel Guerin Gallery, Paris, France
- "Print & Drawing" Co-op, Kyoto, Japan

1999

- Pilar Riberaygua Gallery, Andorra
- NICAF. Nagoya art fair. Naitoh Gallery, Japan
- Pierre Marie Vitoux Gallery, Paris
- Michele Guerin Gallery, Limetz, France

2000

- Maison Du Roi, Sigean
- Maria Villalba Gallery, Barcelona, Spain

2001

- "Chemins Paralleles, two artistes, Gallery Mssohkan, Kobe, Japan
- Gallery Miyabi, Nagoya, Japan
- Gallery Chisai Oyorokobi, Oono, Japan
- Two artistes, Le Puget Castle, Alzonne, France

2002

- Maria Villalba Gallery, Barcelona, Spain

2003

- Two artistes, Art is Long Gallery, Kyoto, Japan
- Two artistes, Today's Gallery, Ozu, Japan
- Two artistes, Miyabi Gallery, Nagoya, Japan

2004

- Castan Gallery, Perpignan, France
- "Art Paris", Gallery Maria Villalba, Paris Art Fair, France

2005

- Maria Villalba Gallery, Barcelona, Spain
- Michele Guerin Gallery, Limetz, France

2006

- Maison du Chevalier Gallery, Carcassonne, France

2007

- Karlsruhe Art Fair, Gallery Villalba, Germany
- KIAF, Seoul Art Fair, Gallery Adriana Schmidt, Korea
- Two artistes, Gallery Naofu, Gifu, Japan
- Two artistes, Miyabi Gallery, Nagoya, Japan

Group Exhibits

1985

- Visages contemporains de la sculpture en Europe
- Sculpture International Exhibition, Maubeuge museum
- Cultural Center, Boulogne-Billancourt

1987

- Jardin de sculptures, Chateauvert

1988

- Toromania, CIECLE, Gerard Laubie foundation, Massillaugues
- Couleurs de France, Espace AGF, Paris, France

1990

- Points de vue, sculptures, Pierre-Marie Vitoux gallery, Paris, France

1992

- Pestalozzi Gallery (Era-Bauro), Berlin, Germany
- Multiple Art Fair, Adriana Schmidt gallery, Düsseldorf, Germany
- Graphic Arts Fair, Adriana Schmidt gallery, Barcelona, Spain

1993

- Vientos del Este, MAEGHT Gallery, Barcelona, Spain
- 15 Sculptors, Simoncini Gallery, Luxembourg
- Maison du Chevalier Symposium, Carcassonne, France

1994

- Gioia Lazzarini, Pietrasanta, Italy
- Trajectes I Convergencies, Morerra museum, Lleida, Spain
- Verticales, Pierre Marie Vitoux Gallery, Paris, France

1995

- Trajectes I Convergencies, National Gallery, Andorra
- 4 Artistes, Era-Bauro Gallery, Andorra
- Group Show, Duchamp Gallery, Kaohsiung, Taiwan
- Group Show, Color Field Art Space, Taipei, Taiwan
- Simoncini Gallery, Luxembourg
- Myth in Modern Times (Marsha Child, curator), Riverrun Gallery, New Jersey USA
- Trajectes I Convergencies, Jardi Botanic, Cap Roig, Spain
- Trajectes I Convergencies, Tecla Sala, L'Hospitalet, Spain
- Trajectes I Convergencies, Sala Gaspar, Barcelona, Spain

1996

- Memoire des Pierres, Montauban, France
- Traversée des dimentions, Abbaye de Lagrasse, France
- 7 sculpteurs, Michelle Guerin Gallery, Limetz, France
- Group show, Simoncini Gallery, Luxembourg

1997

- 3 artistes, Mic'Art Gallery, Lille, France
- Trajectes I Convergencies, Vitoria Gasteis, Spain
- Saga Art Fair, Gallery Michelle Guerin, Paris, France
- Hualien Stone Show, Hualien, Taiwan
- Three Artists, Les Punxes Gallery, Barcelona, Spain
- Two Artists, 141 Gallery, Nagoya, Japan
- Artists of the Gallery, Vitoux Gallery, Paris, France

1998

- Bras d'honneur, Gerard Laubie Gallery, Massillargue, France
- Group show, Vitoux Gallery, Paris, France
- Marbeilla Art Fair, Pilar Riberaygua Gallery, Spain
- Estampa Art Fair, Michele Guerin Gallery, Madrid, Spain

1999

- Stone Sculptures, Hualien Cultural Center Gallery, Hualien, Taiwan
- Group show, Vitoux Gallery, Paris, France
- Journée du Patrimoine, Carcassonne, France

2000 "20 sculptors", Les Punxes Gallery, Barcelona, Spain

- Artexpo Fair, Maria Villalba Gallery, Barcelona, Spain
- Group show, Girona Cathedral Garden
- Garden Sculptures. Michele Guerin Gallery. Limetz, France
- 15 Artists from the East, Mode Expression Gallery, Perpignan, France
- Estampa Art Fair, Art Estampa Gallery, Madrid, Spain
- Sculptors of the Gallery, Vitoux Gallery, Paris

2001

- France/Israel, Espace des Blanc, Manteaux, Paris, France
- The White and the Black, Michele Guerin Gallery, Limetz, France
- Artexpo Fair, Gallery Maria Villalba, Barcelona, Spain
- Artists of the Gallery, Vitoux Gallery, Paris, France
- Dearte art fair, Gallery Maria Villalba, Madrid, Spain
- Rencontre Européene de Sculpture, Montauban, France

2002

- Art Fair ARTEXPO, Gallery Maria Villalba, Barcelona, Spain
- Mode d'Expression Gallery, Perpignan, France
- La Maison du Chevalier Gallery, Carcassonne, France

2003

- ST'ART, Strasbourg Art Fair, Gallery Maria Villalba, Strasbourg, France
- 10 years, Michele Guerin Gallery, Limetz, France
- Garden sculptures, Michelle Guerin Gallery, Limetz, France
- Space 21 Museum, Matsuyama, Japan

2004

- ST'ART, Strasbourg Art Fair, Gallery Maria Villalba, Strasbourg, France
- Miami Art Fair, Gallery Maria Villalba, Miami, Florida USA
- Five Sculptors, Kraft Lieberman Gallery, Chicago, Illinois USA
- Garden sculpture, Verhage Gallery, Ploegsteert, Belgium
- 4 Artistes, Palais des congres, Perpignan, France
- Toy Sculptures, Kraft Lieberman Gallery, Chicago, Illinois USA

2005

- Perpignan Cathedral, 2-person show, Gallery Roger Castan, Perpignan, France
- Le Puget castel group show, Triskel Gallery, Alzonne, France
- Group show, Gallery Maria Villalba, Barcelona, Spain

2006

- Karlsruhe art fair, Gallery Michel Guerin, Karlsruhe, Germany
- Campo Santo garden show, Roger Castan Gallery, Perpignan, France
- Group show, Gallery Maria Villalba, Barcelona, Spain
- Group show, Kraft Lieberman Gallery, Chicago, Illinois USA

2007

- Art Madrid, Art Fair, Gallery Villalba, Madrid, Spain

Monumental Open-Air Sculptures

1987 - Sculpture (1%), Les Aunettes, Évry III, Versailles, Paris, France

1988 - Monumental Sculptures Park, Sculpture Symposium, Gueugnon, France

1990 - UCCOAR, Samary Park, Sculpture International Symposium

1991 - Lavelanet museum, Sculpture Symposium

1993 - International Sculpture Symposia, Carcassonne and Auxerre, France

1994 - Taichung Fine Arts Museum, Taichung, Taiwan

1997 - 1998 Andorra Sculpture Park, Escaldes, Andorra

1999 - Hualien Cultural Center Symposium. Hualien, Taiwan

2002

- Between Sky and Earth, Taipei 101, Taipei, Taiwan
- Between Two Mountains, Montbel, France

2004 - Fountain for the City of Chalabre, France

2006 -Mosan Symposium, Korea

2007 - Tudela de Duero symposium, Spain

Collections

- Long Beach Art Association, New York, New York USA
- Bibliothèque nationale de Paris, France
- Raychem Collection, Paris, France
- Musée de l'Art Contemporain, Chamalières, France
- Government of Andorra
- Taichung Fine Arts Museum and Taipei Fine Arts Museum, Taiwan

== See also ==
- Axis mundi
