= Montbel =

Montbel is the name of two communes in France:

- Montbel, in the Ariège department
- Montbel, in the Lozère department
