= Sylvie Rivillon =

French sculptor (born 1959)

Sylvie Rivillon (born 1959) is a French sculptor. Her works in stone, terracotta, wood and bronze often display layers of shapes. Often rippling and natural-looking contours are contained within, emerge from, and merge with shapes suggesting boxes, casings, and architectural structures. Works by Rivillon have been exhibited or installed at exhibits in France, Germany, Belgium, Andorra, Spain, Greece, Korea, Taiwan, the United States, and Japan. Since 2005 her activity has included the creation of monumental sculptures. Her initial works in the genre, Elevation and Construction Around a Wave, are installed in the cities of Kaohsiung and Hualien in Taiwan.

Rivillon received her education in Paris. She graduated from L'École Nationale Supérieure des Beaux-Arts (ENSBA) in 1978 and from L'Ecole nationale supérieure des Arts Décoratifs (ENSAD) in 1983. Since 1990 she has made her home in the south of France. She is married to the Romanian-born sculptor Ariel Moscovici.

== See also ==
- Public Art
- Ariel Moscovici
