= Apple Xinyi A13 =

- Apple信義A13
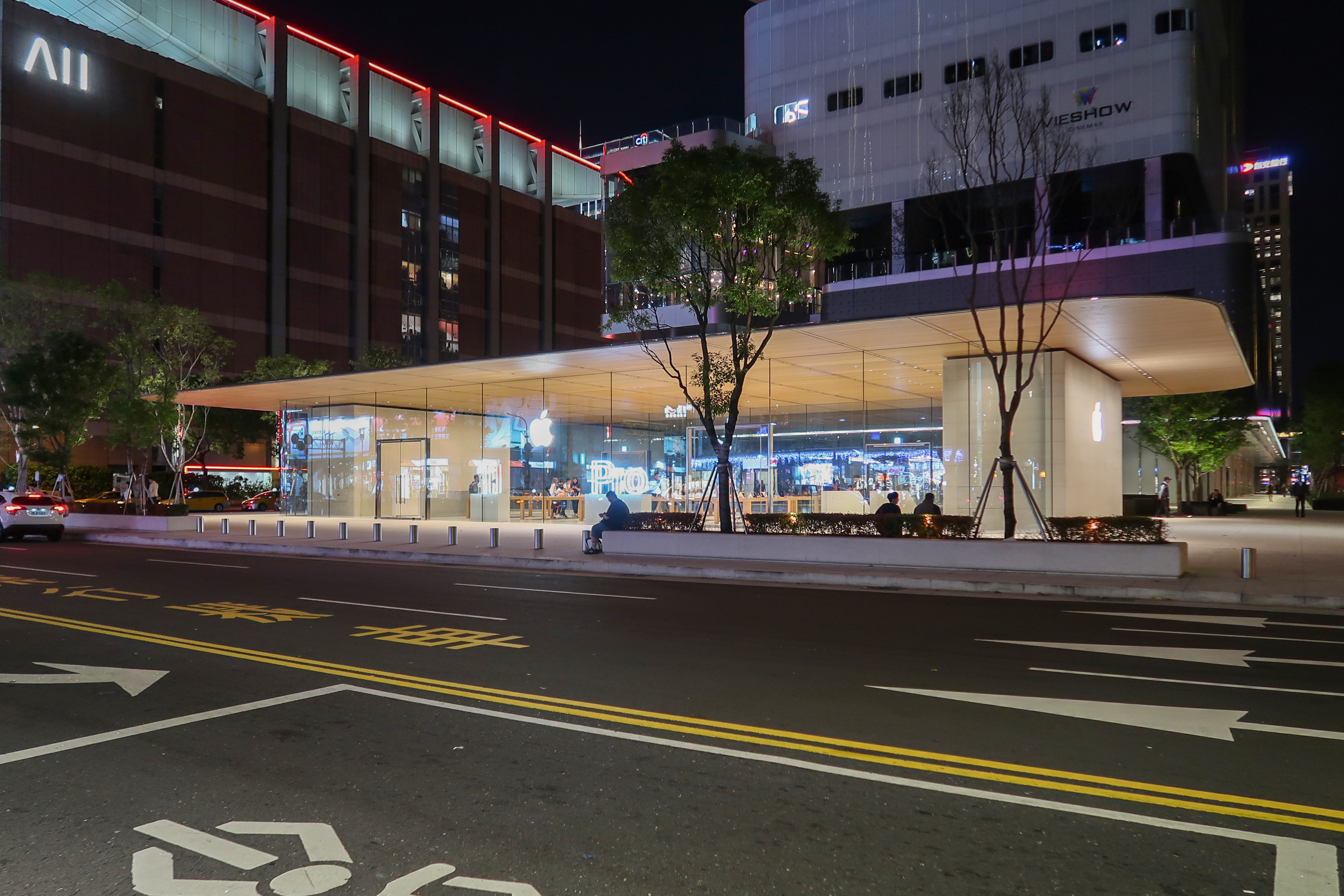
- First floow at night, photographed in November, 2019

General information
- Location: 13, Songshou Road, Xinyi, Taipei, Taiwan
- Opened: June 15, 2019; 7 years ago

Technical details
- Floor count: One ground floor and one basement floor

Website
- Official website

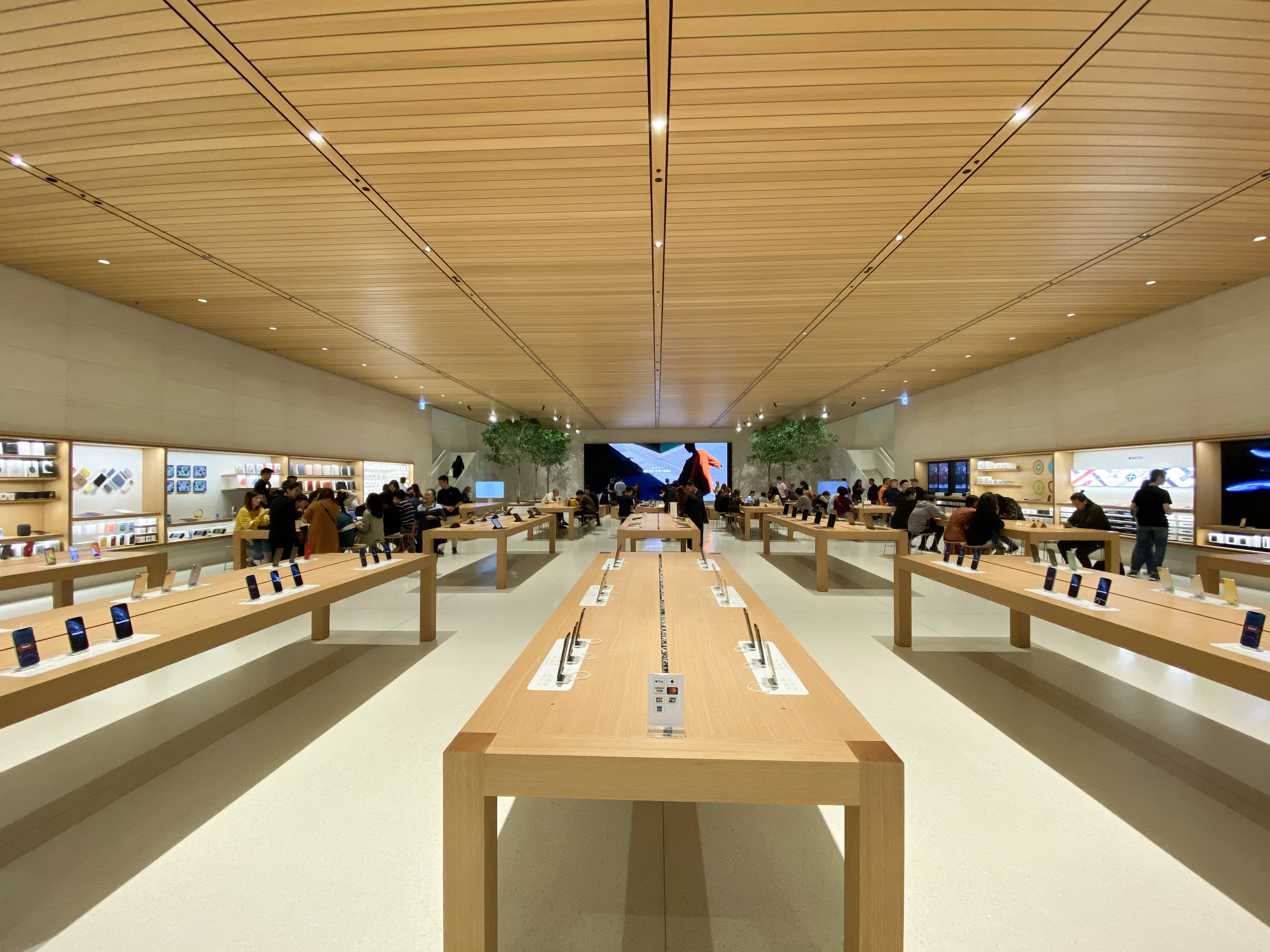
Basement floor

Apple Xinyi A13 (Chinese: Apple信義A13) is an Apple Store in Xinyi District, Taipei, Taiwan. It is in A13, an core area in Xinyi Planning District where FEDS Xinyi A13 locates. The store is consisted of a ground floor and a basement floor, while the basement floor connects to FEDS Xinyi A13. Established on 15 June, 2019, it is the second Apple Store in Taiwan in Taiwan, and the 506th Apple Store in the world. In addition, it is the first Apple Store with an independence building and the first flagship store in Taiwan. It provides serveral services such as experiencing and purchasing Apple products, Today at Apple, and Genius Bar.

== Design ==
Reporters described the store looks like Apple Michigan Avenue and visitor center of Apple Park in overall. The building is constructed of glass curtain walls, wood, and marble.

The roof is built with carbon fiber and wood. Reporters compared its design to MacBook. The handleless stair is built with marble that Apple headquarters (i.e. Apple Park) uses, while the number of stair steps is 13, in a reference of the "A13" area the store locates.

While most design concepts originate from Apple Park, there's a pool outside the store evokes the image of Taiwan as their subject. The pool consists of serveral black rocks and camphor trees. The black rocks are basalt from Penghu, inspired by mountains in Taiwan. Camphor trees are evergreen trees indigenous to Taiwan. Fogs landscape is inspired by local mist in morning.

== See also ==
- Apple Store
- Apple Park
- Apple Taipei 101
