= RWDI =

Canadian engineering company

RWDI (Rowan Williams Davies & Irwin)
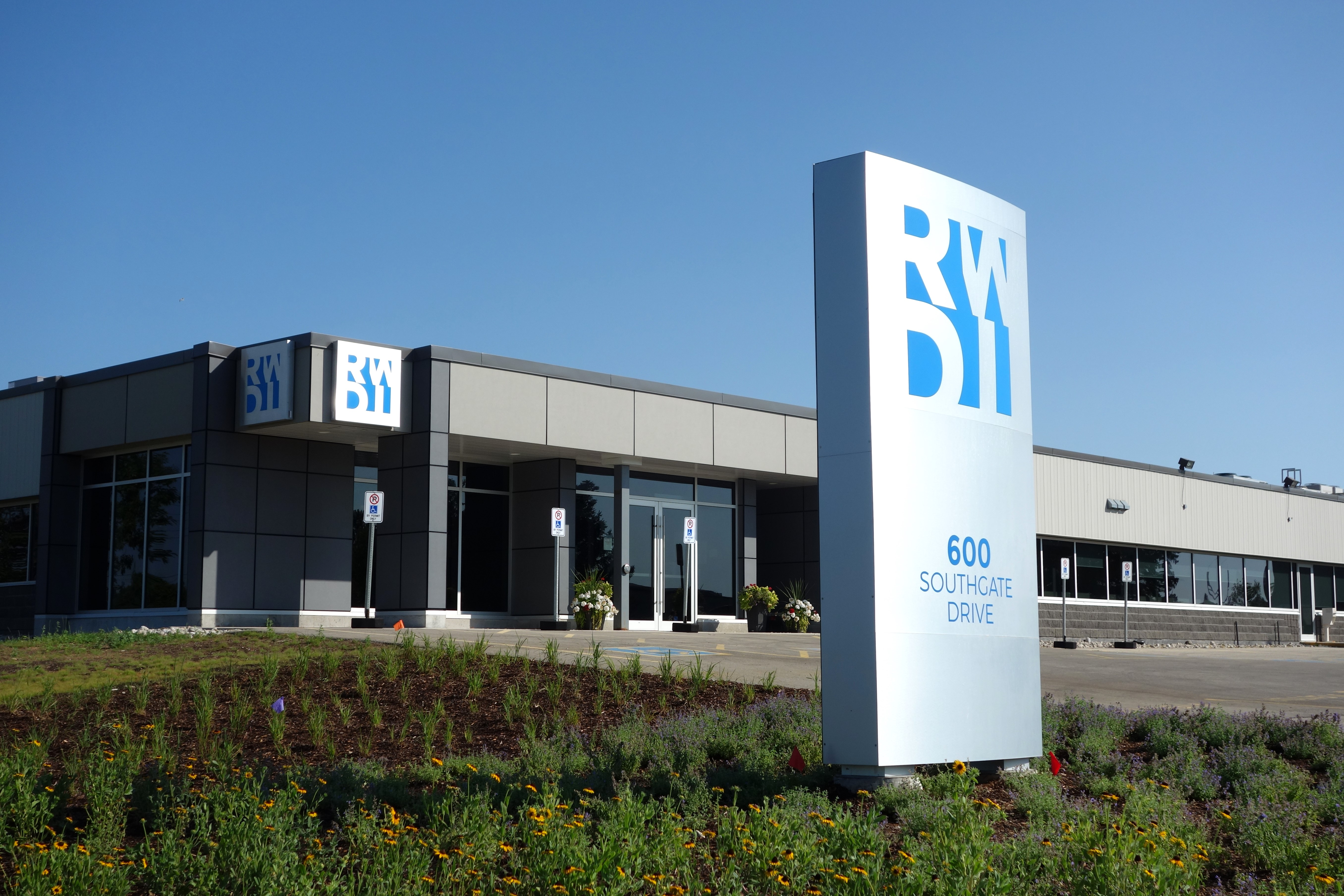
- RWDI's Global Head Office in Guelph, Canada
- Type: Private
- Industry: Engineering and construction consulting, environmental consulting, professional services, urban planning
- Founded: 1972
- Headquarters: 600 Southgate Drive; Guelph, Ontario; N1G 4P6
- Key people: Mike Soligo, President
- Number of employees: ~800 (2023)
- Subsidiaries: Motioneering, Orbital Stack, ParticleOne, RWDI Ventures
- Website: rwdi.com

Established in 1972, Rowan Williams Davies & Irwin Inc. (RWDI) is a Canadian engineering consulting firm that specializes in wind engineering and environmental engineering. The RWDI group of companies has offices in Canada, USA, United Kingdom, India, China, Singapore, Hong Kong, Malaysia, and Australia. The company's headquarters is based in Guelph, Ontario, Canada.

RWDI has featured on numerous television documentaries involving wind engineering and related services for the world's tallest skyscrapers and landmark structures. The firm's facilities include five boundary-layer wind tunnels, an open channel water flume, MM5 computer models for simulating atmospheric weather conditions, and advanced computer modelling capabilities, including computational fluid dynamics (CFD). The company created a software-as-a-service, web-based platform called Orbital Stack, a flow visualization model simulator that allows designers and engineers to rapidly iterate on their designs while seeing the microclimate impact on a 3D viewer.

RWDI also has in-house model shops at each of its wind tunnel facilities that use stereolithography technology, integrated data acquisition, storage and processing systems, computer-aided drafting, and a broad base of specialized instrumentation. The firm has conducted wind engineering on projects including the London Millennium Bridge, International Commerce Centre in Hong Kong, Petronas Towers in Malaysia, Freedom Tower on the WTC Site, the second span of the Tacoma Narrows Bridge, Taipei 101 Tower, and the mega-skyscraper Burj Khalifa, currently the world's tallest building. The company conducts climate and performance engineering in many areas, including environmental noise and air quality modeling, building science and enclosures, acoustics, geoscience, sustainability and energy modeling, as well as weather forecasting and meteorology services.

RWDI currently has Platinum Club status as part of Canada's Best Managed Companies.

== History ==
RWDI started with snow accumulation and drifting studies for Southern Ontario’s farming community. Frank Theakston, a professor at the University of Guelph in the Ontario Agricultural College, developed a technique to simulate ground-level winds and drifting snow using an open-channel water flume. Bill Rowan, one of RWDI's founders, worked with Theakston and marketed the technique to local architectural firms. The Canadian government eventually included it in design standards.

In 1974, Colin Williams joined to work on the water flume. Anton Davies led the building of the first wind tunnel in 1978, and Peter Irwin joined in 1980 to further develop the firm's wind engineering capabilities. In 1982, the firm became a branch of Morrison Hershfield.

After projects including Toronto's SkyDome (1985) and the Wind-gate in Buffalo (1984), the founding members wanted to establish their own firm. Thus, Bill Rowan, Colin Williams, Anton Davies, and Peter Irwin formed Rowan Williams Davies and Irwin (RWDI). Bill Rowan was its first President.

== Related companies ==
Launched as the first RWDI spinoff company:

- Established in 2000, Motioneering designs and delivers specialized damping systems for buildings, bridges, and other structures. Motioneering has consulted on over 300+ supplementary damping systems worldwide, including the iconic tuned mass damper ball in Taipei 101, Shanghai Tower, 111 West 57th Street Tower, Central Park Tower, Madison Square Garden, Grand Canyon Skywalk, and the Dublin Spire.

Launched under the RWDI Ventures Incubator:

- Orbital Stack is a web-based software solution that simulates various climate conditions for engineering and architectural design. Launched in 2020, Orbital Stack uses both artificial intelligence (AI) and computational fluid dynamics (CFD) to model wind comfort and safety, airflow patterns, outdoor thermal comfort and daylighting, and cladding pressure for buildings and urban spaces.
- ClimateFirst is climate-risk analysis software that models the impact of a changing climate on specific building systems to determine financial costs and provide practical guidance to mitigate risks.
- ParticleOne is a predictive software tool that monitors indoor air quality, including airborne diseases, and models specific viral risks (including SARS-CoV-2, influenza, rhinovirus, and RSV).
