= Taipei 101 Run Up =

Annual running race

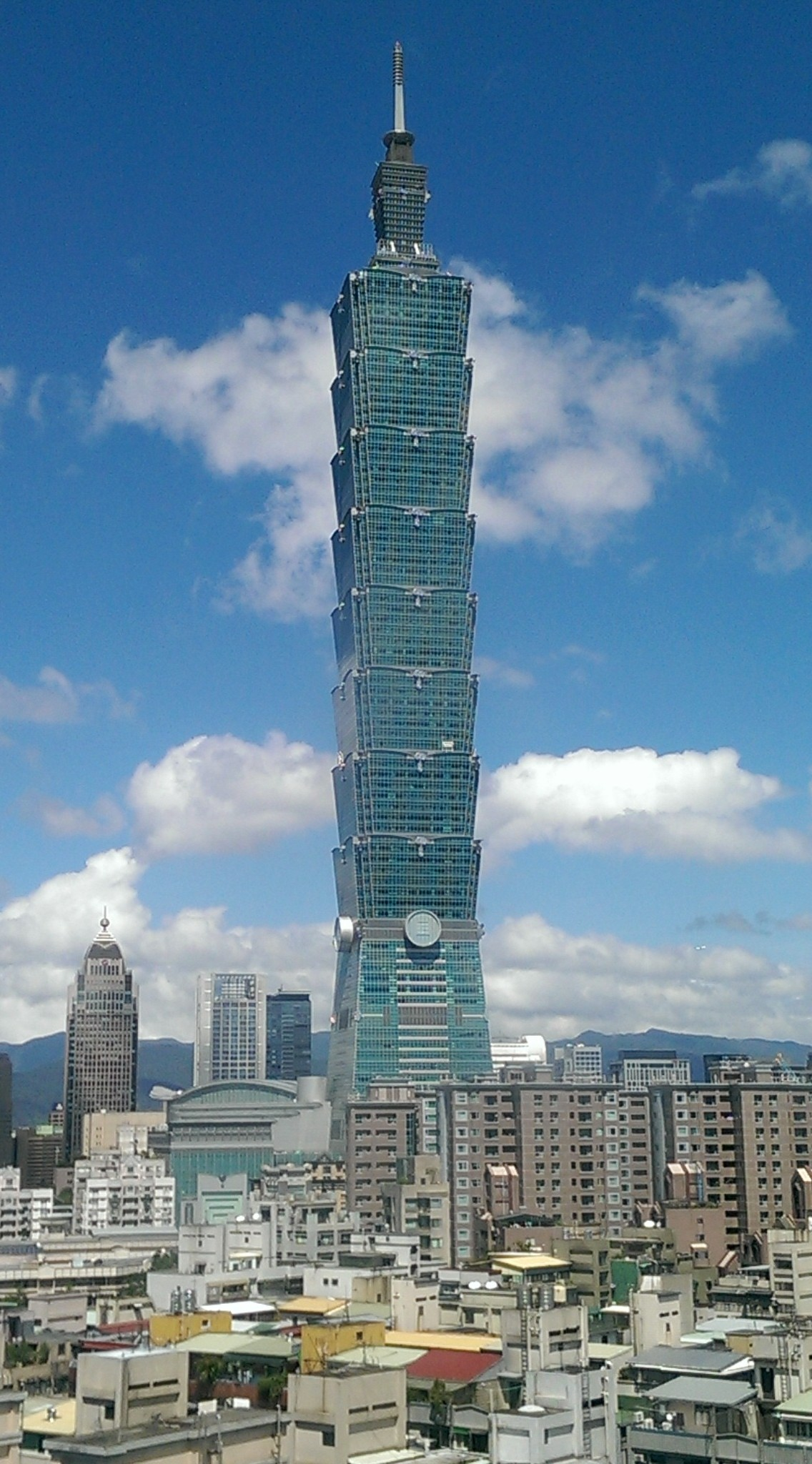
Tower of Taipei 101 that race it located within

The Taipei 101 Run Up (Chinese: 台北101垂直馬拉松, literally "Taipei 101 Vertical Marathon", original name: 台北101國際登高賽, literally "Taipei 101 International Climbing Competition") is an annual race that takes place at Taipei 101.

== Background ==
Since 2005, after the building's security clearance to the 91st floor was approved, the race was introduced to promote international recognition of Taipei 101. The idea for the event emerged from discussions between Taipei 101 management and representatives of Taiwan's sports sector, leading to the inaugural race that year. The event has been successfully held 15 times, with title sponsorships from companies such as Chang Hwa Bank, Toyota Motor Corporation, and Standard Chartered Bank. In 2018, the race also served as the final event of the 2018 Towerrunning World Championships, further elevating its global profile.

At the time of its debut, Taipei 101 was the tallest building in the world, making it an initiative to hold the race in the building, which officially surpassed the Empire State Building in New York as the world's tallest building for an international ascent race. However, due to safety concerns, there is a limit to the number of participants, so not all long-distance runners or climbers may be able to participate in this event, and they must pass a health check before they can officially participate in the race.
