= Taipei Financial Center Corporation =

Taiwanese company

Taipei Financial Center Corporation 台北金融大樓公司
- Founded: October 14, 1997; 29 years ago
- Headquarters: Xinyi District, Taipei, Taiwan
- Area served: Taiwan
- Website: www.taipei-101.com.tw/

The Taipei Financial Center Corporation (Chinese: 臺北金融大樓公司; pinyin: Táiběi Jīnróng Dàlóu Gōngsī) is a Taiwanese company notable for its ownership of Taipei 101.

Lendlease was the company's retail consultant in 2003. Ting Hsin International Group was its biggest shareholder, with a 37% stake, in 2010. In 2014, Ting Hsin International Group said it would sell its Taipei Financial Center Corporation shares to raise cash for around $770 million. Sometime around 2018 ITOCHU purchased 37% of Taipei Financial Center Corporation, which it spent US$670 million on.

The other largest shareholders are Chunghwa Telecom, Taiwan Stock Exchange, Mega Financial Holding, and CTBC Financial Holding.

== See also ==
- List of companies of Taiwan
