= Taipei 101 =

Skyscraper in Taiwan

TAIPEI 101
- 台北101

- Taipei 101 in September 2026
- Former names: Taipei World Financial Center
- Alternative names: Top of Taipei, Taipei Tower, Tower of Taipei

Record height
- Tallest in the world from 2004 to 2009^{[I]}
- Preceded by: Willis Tower; Petronas Towers (Note: According to CTBUH, the title of "tallest building in the world" was disputed between Chicago's Willis Tower and Kuala Lumpur's Petronas Towers since the latter's completion in 1998. It stated that the Willis Tower – then officially known as the Sears Tower – was taller than the Petronas Towers in terms of tip height, roof height, and highest occupied floor. Nevertheless, both of their record heights were surpassed by Taipei 101 when it was completed in 2004.)
- Surpassed by: Burj Khalifa

General information
- Status: Completed
- Type: Skyscraper
- Architectural style: Postmodern; Neo-futurism
- Location: Taipei, Taiwan, No. 7, Section 5, Xinyi Road, Xinyi District
- Coordinates: 25°02′01″N 121°33′53″E
- Groundbreaking: 31 January 1999; 27 years ago
- Construction started: 31 July 1999; 27 years ago
- Topped-out: 13 June 2001; 25 years ago (mall); 1 July 2003; 23 years ago (tower)
- Completed: 14 November 2003; 23 years ago (mall); 31 December 2004; 21 years ago (tower)
- Opened: 31 December 2004; 21 years ago
- Cost: NT$58 billion (US$1.9 billion)
- Owner: Taipei Financial Center Corporation

Height
- Height: 508.0 m (1,667 ft)
- Architectural: 508.2 m (1,667 ft)
- Tip: 509.2 m (1,671 ft)
- Roof: 449.2 m (1,474 ft)
- Top floor: 438.0 m (1,437 ft)
- Observatory: 449.2 m (1,474 ft)

Technical details
- Floor count: 101
- Floor area: 412,500 m^{2} (4,440,100 sq ft)
- Lifts/elevators: 61 installed by Toshiba with KONE EcoDisc motors

Design and construction
- Architects: C.Y. Lee and C.P. Wang
- Structural engineer: Evergreen Consulting Engineering and Thornton Tomasetti
- Main contractor: KTRT Joint Venture: Kumagai Gumi, Taiwan Kumagai, RSEA, Ta-Yo-Wei; Samsung C&T
- Awards: Existing Buildings, LEED Platinum O+M

Website
- taipei-101.com.tw

Taipei 101
- Chinese: 台北101
- Literal meaning: "Tai[wan] North 101"
Transcriptions
Standard Mandarin
- Hanyu Pinyin: Táiběi 101
- Bopomofo: ㄊㄞˊ ㄅㄟˇ ㄧ ㄌㄧㄥˊ ㄧ
- Gwoyeu Romatzyh: Tairbeei 101
- Wade–Giles: Tʻai^{2}-pei^{3} 101
- Tongyong Pinyin: Táiběi 101
- MPS2: Táiběi 101
- IPA: [tʰǎɪ.pèɪ] 101
Wu
- Suzhounese: De^{2}-poq^{7} 101
Hakka
- Romanization: Thòi-pet 101
Yue: Cantonese
- Yale Romanization: Tòih-bāk 101
- Jyutping: toi4 bak1 101
- IPA: [tʰɔj˩ pɐk̚˥] 101
Southern Min
- Hokkien POJ: Tâi-pak 101
- Tâi-lô: Tâi-pak 101
Eastern Min
- Fuzhou BUC: Dài-báe̤k 101

Taipei World Financial Center
- Traditional Chinese: 臺北國際金融中心
- Simplified Chinese: 台北国际金融中心
Transcriptions
Standard Mandarin
- Hanyu Pinyin: Táiběi Guójì Jīnróng Zhōngxīn
- Bopomofo: ㄊㄞˊ ㄅㄟˇ ㄍㄨㄛˊ ㄐㄧˋ ㄐㄧㄣ ㄖㄨㄥˊ ㄓㄨㄥ ㄒㄧㄣ
- Wade–Giles: Tʻai^{2}-pei^{3} Kuo^{2}-chi^{4} Chin^{1}-jung^{2} Chung^{1}-hsin^{1}
- Tongyong Pinyin: Táiběi Guó-jì Jin-róng Jhong-sin
- IPA: [tʰǎɪ.pèɪ kwǒ.tɕî tɕín.ɻʊ̌ŋ ʈʂʊ́ŋ.ɕín]
Yue: Cantonese
- Jyutping: toi4 bak1 gwok3 zai3 gam1 jung4 zung1 sam1
- IPA: [tʰɔj˩ pɐk̚˥ kʷɔk̚˧ tsɐj˧ kɐm˥ jʊŋ˩ tsʊŋ˥ sɐm˥]
Southern Min
- Hokkien POJ: Tâi-pak kok-chè kim-iông Tiong-sim

Taipei 101 (Chinese: 台北101; pinyin: Táiběi Yīlíngyī; stylized in all caps), formerly known as the Taipei World Financial Center, is a 508-meter (1,667 ft), 101-story skyscraper in Taipei, Taiwan. It is owned by the Taipei Financial Center Corporation. It was officially classified as the world's tallest building from its opening on 31 December 2004 until it was surpassed by the Burj Khalifa in 2009. As of 2026, it is the tallest building in Taiwan and the eleventh tallest in the world.

The building's high-speed elevators were manufactured by Toshiba of Japan and held the record for the fastest in the world at the time of completion, transporting passengers from the 5th to the 89th floor in 37 seconds (attaining 60.6 kilometers per hour or 37.7 miles per hour). (Note: 1,010 m/min elevator speed makes this true) In 2011, Taipei 101 was awarded a Platinum certificate rating under the LEED certification system for energy efficiency and environmental design, becoming the tallest and largest green building in the world. The structure regularly appears as an icon of Taipei in international media, and the Taipei 101 fireworks displays are a regular feature of New Year's Eve broadcasts and celebrations.

Taipei 101's postmodernist and neo-futurist architectural style evokes traditional Asian aesthetics in a modern structure employing industrial materials. Its design incorporates a number of features that enable the structure to withstand the Pacific Ring of Fire's earthquakes and the region's tropical storms. The tower houses offices, restaurants, shops, and indoor and outdoor observatories. The tower is adjoined by a multilevel shopping mall that has the world's largest ruyi symbol as an exterior feature.

== History ==
=== Planning ===
The Taipei Financial Center Corporation, a team led by several Taiwan banks and insurance companies, won the rights to lease the site for 69.9 years and develop a building, placing the winning bid of NT$20,688,889,999 for the Build Operate Transfer agreement with the city government.

=== Construction ===
Planning for Taipei 101 began in July 1997 during Chen Shui-bian's term as Taipei mayor. Talks between merchants and city government officials initially centered on a proposal for a 66-story tower to serve as an anchor for new development in Taipei's 101 business district. Planners were considering taking the new structure to a more ambitious height only after an expat suggested it, along with many of the other features used in the design of the building. It was not until the summer of 2000 that the city granted a license for the construction of a 101-story tower on the site. In the meantime, construction proceeded and the first tower column was erected in the summer of 2001.

A major earthquake struck Taiwan on 31 March 2002, sending two construction cranes falling from the 56th floor onto streets near Xinyi (Hsinyi) Road. The cranes crushed several vehicles and caused five deaths - two crane operators and three other construction workers. However, the project’s backers said the building itself had not been structurally damaged. Construction work was halted pending safety inspections, and later restarted in stages, with full resumption approved in late June and early July 2002.

Taipei 101's roof was completed three years later on 1 July 2003. Taipei 101 was completed in 2004. The construction was a joint venture led by Kumagai Gumi, a Japanese construction company, in cooperation with Samsung C&T, a South Korean construction company. Samsung C&T was responsible for overseeing the construction of the main structural framework, and RESE was responsible for the construction logistics and main foundation. Ma Ying-jeou, in his first term as Taipei mayor, fastened a golden bolt to signify the achievement. The formal opening of the tower took place on 31 December 2004. President Chen Shui-bian, Taipei Mayor Ma Ying-jeou and Legislative Speaker Wang Jin-pyng cut the ribbon. Open-air concerts featured a number of popular performers, including singers A-Mei and Stefanie Sun. Visitors rode the elevators to the Observatory for the first time. A few hours later the first fireworks show at Taipei 101 heralded the arrival of a new year. It replaced the Petronas Towers in Kuala Lumpur as the world's tallest building.

=== Post-construction ===
The Taipei Financial Center Corporation (TFCC) announced plans on 2 November 2009 to make Taipei 101 "the world's tallest building" by summer of 2011 as measured by LEED standards. The structure was already designed to be energy-efficient, with double-pane windows blocking external heat by 50% and recycled water meeting 20–30% of the building's needs. LEED certification would entail inspections and upgrades in wiring, water and lighting equipment at a cost of NT$60 million (US$1.8 million). Estimates showed the savings resulting from the modifications paid for the cost of making them within three years. The project was carried out under the guidance of an international team composed of Siemens Building Technologies, architect and interior designer Steven Leach Group and the LEED advisory firm EcoTech International. The company applied for a platinum-degree certification with LEED in early 2011. On 28 July 2011, Taipei 101 received LEED platinum certification under "Existing Buildings: Operations and Maintenance". Although the project cost NT$60 million (US$2.08 million), it is expected to save 14.4 million kilowatt-hours of electricity, or an 18% energy-saving, equivalent to NT$36 million (US$1.2 million) in energy costs each year. In 2019, it was named among the 50 most influential skyscrapers in the world by the Council on Tall Buildings and Urban Habitat.

On 4 January 2020, the building had a condolence message in lights for the victims of a helicopter crash, which included a number of senior government officials. On 8 February 2020, it was reported that some passengers of the Diamond Princess cruise liner, quarantined for an outbreak of COVID-19, had visited Taipei 101 on 31 January at which point none exhibited symptoms. On 1 April 2020, the shopping center said it was reducing business hours due to the coronavirus pandemic. It had started checking shopper's temperatures in February. On 21 May 2020, the building said it would resume normal business hours in June, as the country had effectively limited the spread of COVID-19.

== Usages ==
=== Events and celebrity appearances ===
Taipei 101 is the site of many special events. Art exhibits, as noted above, regularly take place in the Observatory. A few noteworthy dates since the tower's opening include these below:

- On 25 December 2004, French rock and urban climber Alain Robert made an authorized climb to the top of the pinnacle in four hours.
- On 28 February 2005, former President of the United States Bill Clinton visited and signed copies of his autobiography.
- On 19 April 2005, the tower displayed the formula "E=mc^{2}" in lights to celebrate the 100th anniversary of the publication of Einstein's theory of relativity. The display, the largest of 65,000 such displays in 47 countries, was part of the international celebration World Year of Physics 2005.
- On 20 November 2005, the First annual Taipei 101 Run Up featured a race up the 2,046 steps from floors 1 to 91. Proceeds were to benefit Taiwan's Olympic teams. Run Ups have continued to be held regularly.
- On 20 October 2006, the tower displayed a pink ribbon in lights to promote breast cancer awareness. The ten-day campaign was sponsored by Taipei 101's ownership and Estée Lauder.
- On 12 December 2007, Austrian BASE jumper Felix Baumgartner survived an unauthorized parachute jump from the 91st floor. Baumgartner was banned from re-entry into Taiwan and Taipei 101 increased security measures along with disciplining security staff for failing to intervene.
- On 6 December 2014, Japanese idol group HKT48 held a small concert on the 91st-floor observatory as the premiere of their tour in Taiwan.
- On 25 January 2026, American climber Alex Honnold completed an authorized free solo climb of Taipei 101 in one hour, 31 minutes and 43 seconds, the tallest urban free solo climb in history. The event was streamed by Netflix under the title Skyscraper Live.

=== New Year's Eve fireworks displays ===
The New Year's Eve Show in Taipei is held at the Taipei City Hall. Visitors have a view of Taipei 101 which is surrounded by fireworks at midnight. Another popular location for crowds to gather to see the fireworks display is the public square of Sun Yat-sen Memorial Hall.

The official logo of Taipei 101.

== Architecture and design ==
=== Height ===
Various sources, including the building's owners, give the height of Taipei 101 as 508 m (1,667 ft), roof height and top floor height as 448 m (1,470 ft) and 438 m (1,437 ft). This lower figure is derived by measuring from the top of a 1.2 m (3 ft 11 in) platform at the base. CTBUH standards include the height of the platform in calculating the overall height, as it represents part of the man-made structure and is above the level of the surrounding pavement. Taipei 101 displaced the Petronas Towers as the tallest building in the world by 57.3 m (188 ft). The record it claimed for greatest height from ground to pinnacle was surpassed by the Burj Khalifa in Dubai, which is 829.8 m (2,722 ft) in height. Taipei 101's records for roof height and highest occupied floor briefly passed to the Shanghai World Financial Center in 2008, However, this record was surpassed by the Burj Khalifa in Dubai, United Arab Emirates in 2009.

Taipei 101 was the world's tallest building, at 508.2 m (1,667 ft) as measured to its architectural top (spire), exceeding that of the Petronas Towers, which were previously the tallest skyscraper at 451.9 m (1,483 ft). The height to the top of the roof, at 449.2 m (1,474 ft), and highest occupied floor, at 439.2 m (1,441 ft), surpassed the previous records of the Willis Tower: 442 m (1,450 ft) and 412.4 m (1,353 ft), respectively. It also surpassed the 85-story, 347.5 m (1,140 ft) Tuntex Sky Tower in Kaohsiung as the tallest building in Taiwan and the 51-story, 244.15 m (801 ft) Shin Kong Life Tower as the tallest building in Taipei.

Taipei 101 comprises 101 floors above ground, as well as five basement levels. The first building to break the half-kilometer mark in height, it was the world's tallest building from 31 March 2004 to 10 March 2010 (six years) until it was surpassed by the Burj Khalifa in 2010. For 12 years, it also housed the fastest elevator, at 61 kilometers per hour (38 mph). It also has the largest wind damper in the world, at 18 feet across. As of 2023, Taipei 101 is the eleventh-tallest building in the world, according to the Council on Tall Buildings and Urban Habitat's official rankings.

=== Structural design ===
Taipei 101 is designed to withstand typhoon winds and earthquake tremors that are common in the area in the east of Taiwan. Evergreen Consulting Engineering, the structural engineer, designed Taipei 101 to withstand gale winds of 60 meters per second (197 ft/s), (216 km/h or 134 mph), as well as the strongest earthquakes in a 2,500-year cycle.

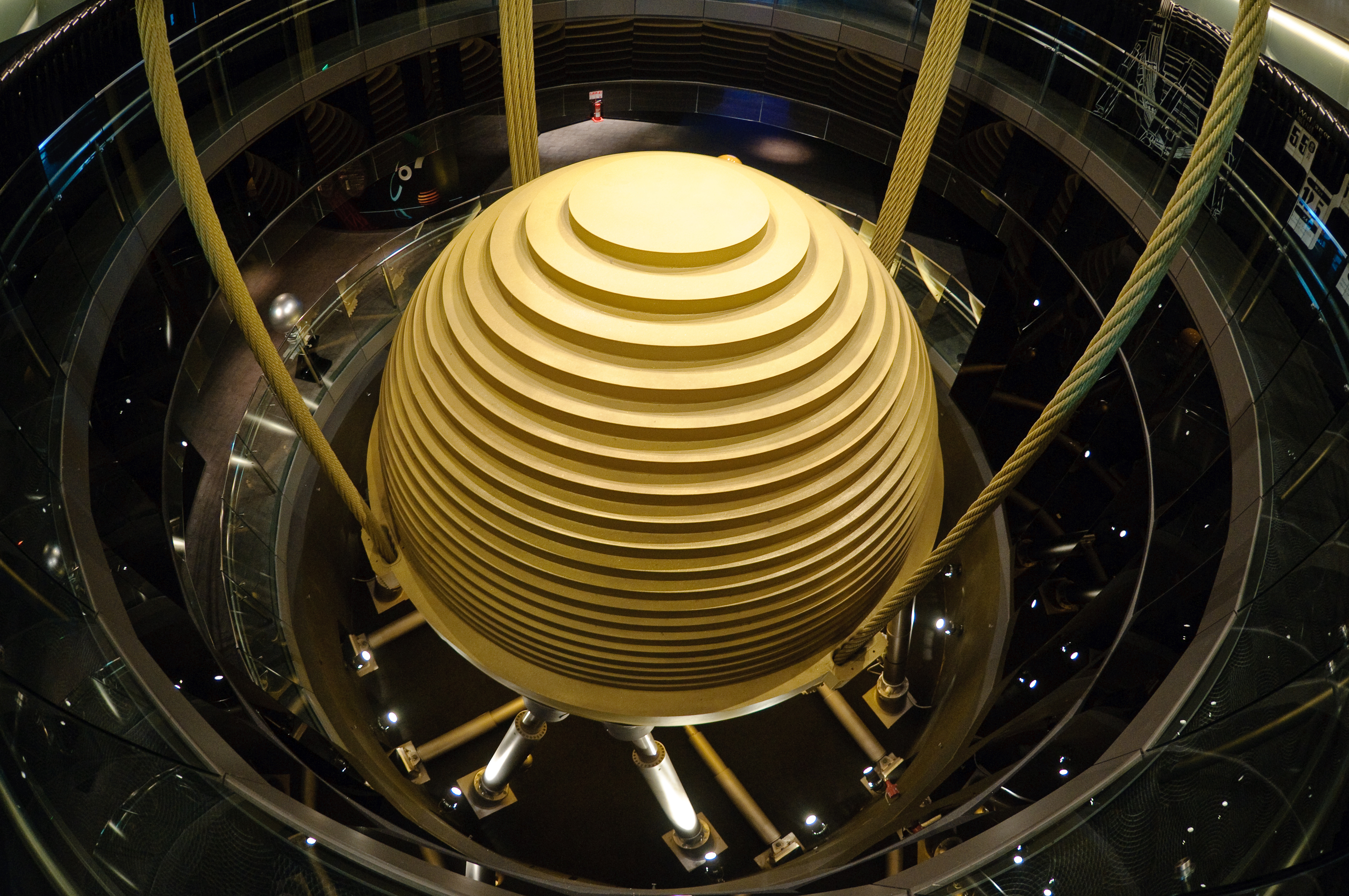

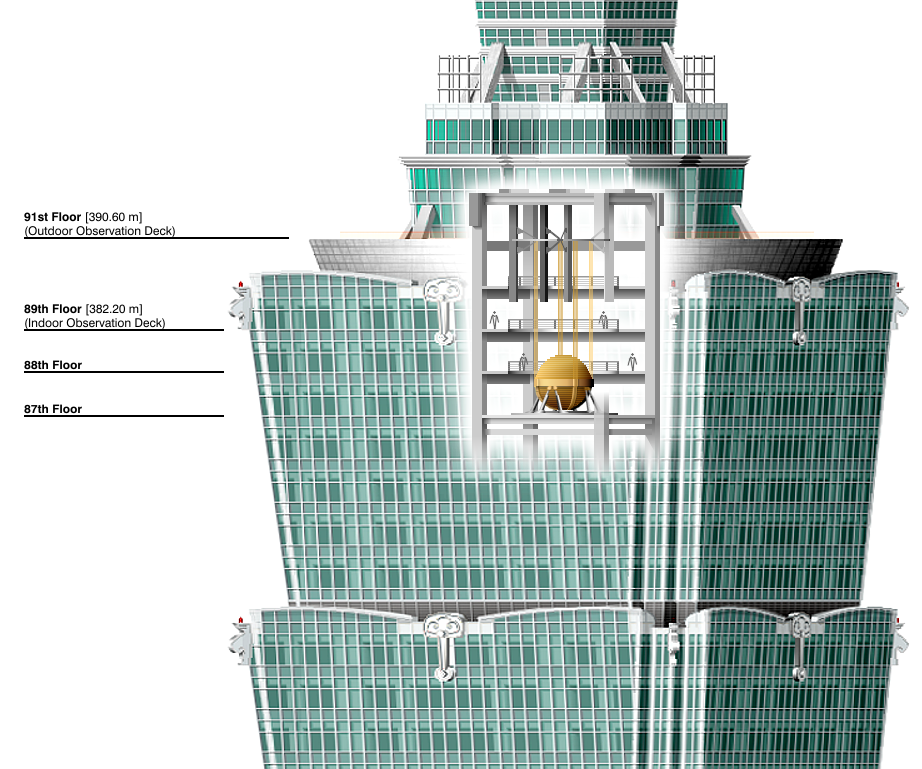
Location of Taipei 101's largest tuned mass damper

Taipei 101 was designed to be flexible as well as structurally resistant, because while flexibility prevents structural damage, resistance ensures comfort both for the occupants and for the protection of the glass, curtain walls, and other features. Most designs achieve the necessary strength by enlarging critical structural elements such as bracing. Because of the height of Taipei 101, combined with the surrounding area's geology—the building is located just 660 ft (200 m) away from a major fault line—outrigger trusses, located at eight-floor intervals, connect the columns in the building's core to those on the exterior.

These features, combined with the solidity of its foundation, made Taipei 101 one of the most stable buildings ever constructed. The foundation is reinforced by 380 piles driven 80 m (262 ft) into the ground, extending as far as 30 m (98 ft) into the bedrock. Each pile is 1.5 m (4 ft 11 in) in diameter and can bear a load of 1,000–1,320 metric tons (1,100–1,460 short tons).

Motioneering designed a 660-metric-ton (728-short-ton) steel pendulum that serves as a tuned mass damper, at a cost of NT$132 million (US$4 million). Suspended from the 92nd to the 88th floor, the pendulum sways to offset movements in the building caused by strong gusts. The tuned mass damper is visible to all visitors on the 88th floor upwards until the 92nd floor. It can reduce up to 40% of the tower's movements. Its ball, the largest damper ball in the world, consists of 41 circular steel plates of varying diameters, each 125 mm (4.92 in) thick, welded together to form a 5.5-meter-diameter (18 ft) ball. Two additional tuned mass dampers, each weighing 6 metric tons (7 short tons), are installed at the tip of the spire which help prevent damage to the structure due to strong wind loads. On 8 August 2015, strong winds from Typhoon Soudelor swayed the main damper by 1 meter (39 in)—the largest movement ever recorded by the damper.

The damper has become such a popular tourist attraction that the city contracted Sanrio to create a mascot: the Damper Baby. Five versions of the Damper Baby ("Rich Gold", "Cool Black", "Smart Silver", "Happy Green" and "Lucky Red") were designed and made into figurines and souvenirs sold in various Taipei 101 gift shops. Damper Baby has become a popular local icon, with its own comic book and website.

=== Structural facade ===
Taipei 101's characteristic blue-green glass curtain walls are double paned and glazed, offer heat and UV protection sufficient to block external heat by 50%, and can sustain impacts of 7 metric tons (8 short tons). The facade system of glass and aluminum panels installed into an inclined movement-resisting lattice contributes to overall lateral rigidity by tying back to the mega-columns with one-story high trusses at every eighth floor. This facade system is, therefore, able to withstand up to 95 mm (4 in) of seismic lateral displacements without damage. The facade system is also known as a Damper.

The original corners of the facade were tested at RWDI in Ontario, Canada. A simulation of a 100-year storm at RWDI revealed a vortex that formed during a 3-second 105-mile-per-hour (169 km/h) wind at a height of 10 meters, or equivalent to the lateral tower sway rate causing large crosswind oscillations. A double chamfered step design was found to dramatically reduce this crosswind oscillation, resulting in the final design's "double stairstep" corner facade. Architect C.Y. Lee also used extensive facade elements to represent the symbolic identity he pursued. These facade elements included the green tinted glass for the indigenous slender bamboo look, eight upper outwards inclined tiers of pagoda each with eight floors, a ruyi and a money box symbol between the two facade sections among others.

Taipei 101's own roof and facade recycled water system meets 20–30% of the building's water needs. In July 2011, Taipei 101 was certified "the world's tallest green building" under LEED standards.

=== Symbolism ===
The height of 101 floors commemorates the renewal of time: the new century that arrived as the tower was built (100+1) and all the new years that follow (1 January = 1-01). It symbolizes lofty ideals by going one better on 100, a traditional number of perfection. The number also evokes the binary numeral system used in digital technology.

The main tower features a series of eight segments of eight floors each. In Chinese-speaking cultures the number eight is associated with abundance, prosperity and good fortune.

The repeated segments simultaneously recall the rhythms of an Asian pagoda (a tower linking earth and sky, also evoked in the Petronas Towers), a stalk of bamboo (an icon of learning and growth), and a stack of ancient Chinese ingots or money boxes (a symbol of abundance). Popular humor sometimes likens the building's shape to a stack of take-out boxes as used in Western-style Chinese food; of course, the stackable shape of such boxes is likewise derived from that of ancient money boxes. The four discs mounted on each face of the building where the pedestal meets the tower represent coins. The emblem placed over entrances shows three gold coins of ancient Chinese design with central holes shaped to imply the Arabic numerals 1-0-1. The structure incorporates many shapes of squares and circles to symbolize yin and yang.

Curled ruyi figures appear throughout the structure as a design motif. Though the shape of each ruyi at Taipei 101 is traditional, its rendering in industrial metal is plainly modern. The ruyi is a talisman of ancient origin associated in art with heavenly clouds. It connotes healing, protection and fulfillment. It appears in celebrations of the attainment of new career heights. The sweeping curved roof of the adjoining mall culminates in a colossal ruyi that shades pedestrians. Each ruyi ornament on the exterior of the Taipei 101 tower stands at least 8 m (26 ft) tall.

At night the bright yellow gleam from its pinnacle casts Taipei 101 in the role of a candle or torch upholding the ideals of liberty and welcome. From 6 to 10 p.m., the tower's lights display one of seven colors on a weekly schedule.

Day	Sunday	Monday	Tuesday	Wednesday	Thursday	Friday	Saturday
Color	violet	red	orange	yellow	green	blue	indigo

From 26 February to 6 March 2022, the typical colors were replaced by blue and yellow in solidarity with Ukraine, in response to the 2022 Russian invasion of Ukraine.

The adjoining Taipei 101 on the east side connects the landmark further with the symbolism of time. The design of the circular park doubles as the face of a giant sundial. The tower itself casts the shadow to mark afternoon for the building's occupants. The park's design is echoed in a clock that stands at its entrance. The clock runs on wind power drawn from the building's wind shear.

Taipei 101, like many of its neighboring buildings, exemplifies the influence of feng shui philosophy. An example appears in the form of a large granite fountain at the intersection of Songlian Road and Xinyi Road near the tower's east entrance. A ball at the fountain's top spins toward the tower. As a work of public art the fountain offers a contrast to the tower in texture even as its design echoes the tower's rhythms. The fountain also serves a practical function in feng shui philosophy. A T intersection near the entrance of a building represents a potential drain of positive energy, or ch'i, from the structure and its occupants. Placing flowing water at such spots is thought to help redirect the flow of ch'i.

=== Interior ===
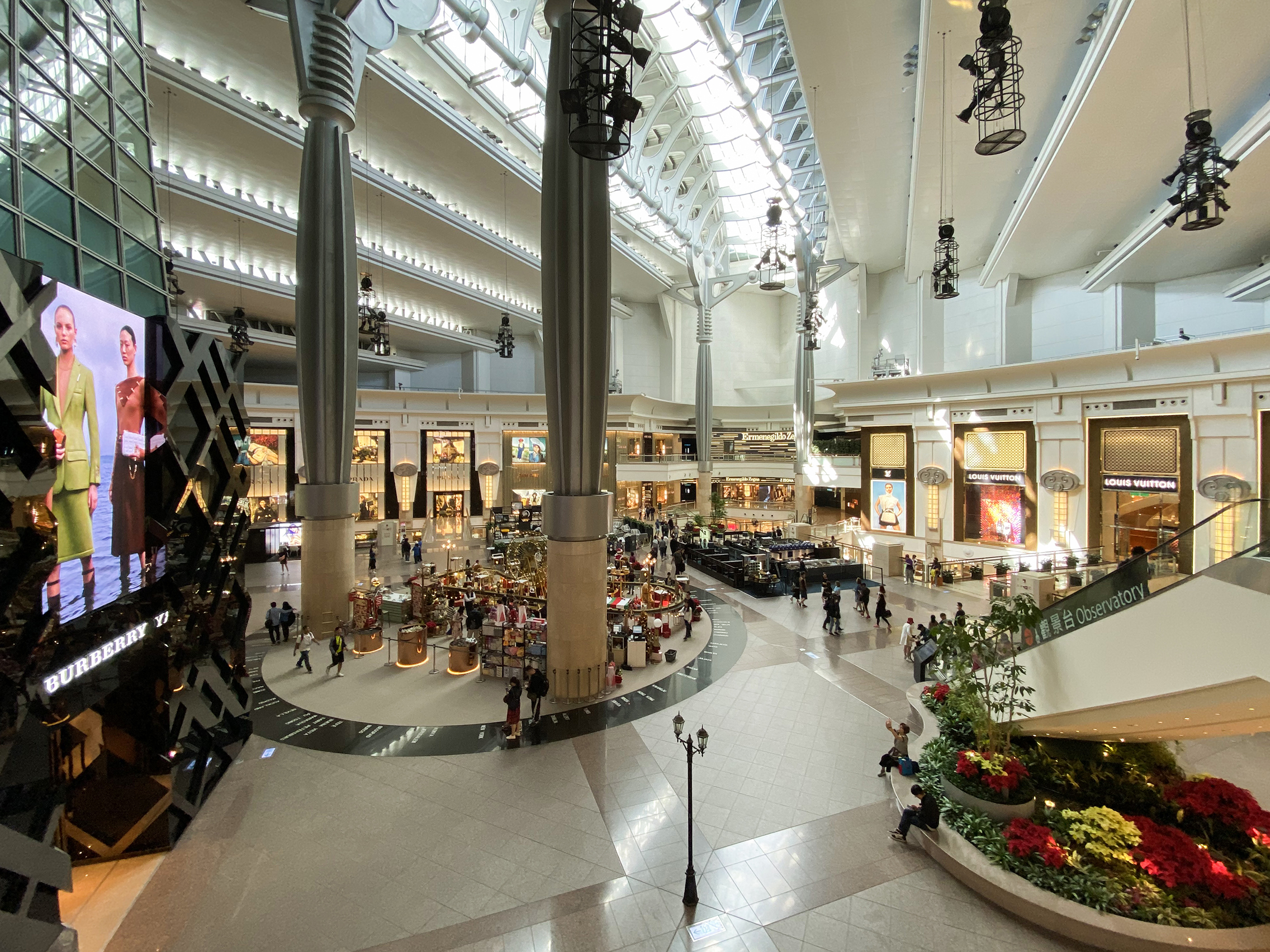
Taipei 101 Mall

Office lobby

Two restaurants have opened on the 85th floor: Diamond Tony's, which offers European-style seafood and steak, and 85TD, which offers Chinese style cuisine. Occupying all of the 86th floor is Taiwanese high-class buffet restaurant A Joy. Din Tai Fung, several international dining establishments and retail outlets also operate in the adjoining mall. The multistory retail mall adjoining the tower is home to hundreds of fashionable stores, restaurants, clubs and other attractions. The mall's interior is modern in design even as it makes use of traditional elements. The curled ruyi symbol is a recurring motif inside the mall. Many features of the interior also observe feng shui traditions.

==== Floor directory ====
A tenant directory is posted in the first floor's lobby (visible from the Xinyi entrance). The number 4 is considered an unlucky number in Chinese culture, so instead the 44th floor is renamed the 43rd, and the actual 43rd floor becomes 42A. As of 1 January 2011, the highest occupied office floor (excluding the observatory and restaurants) was 75. The building appears to be at least 70% occupied at this point. The 92nd through 100th floors are officially designated as communication floors, although it is unknown if there are any radio or TV stations currently broadcasting from the top of Taipei 101. The 101st floor indoor/outdoor rooftop observatory opened to the public on 14 June 2019.

=== Elevator ===
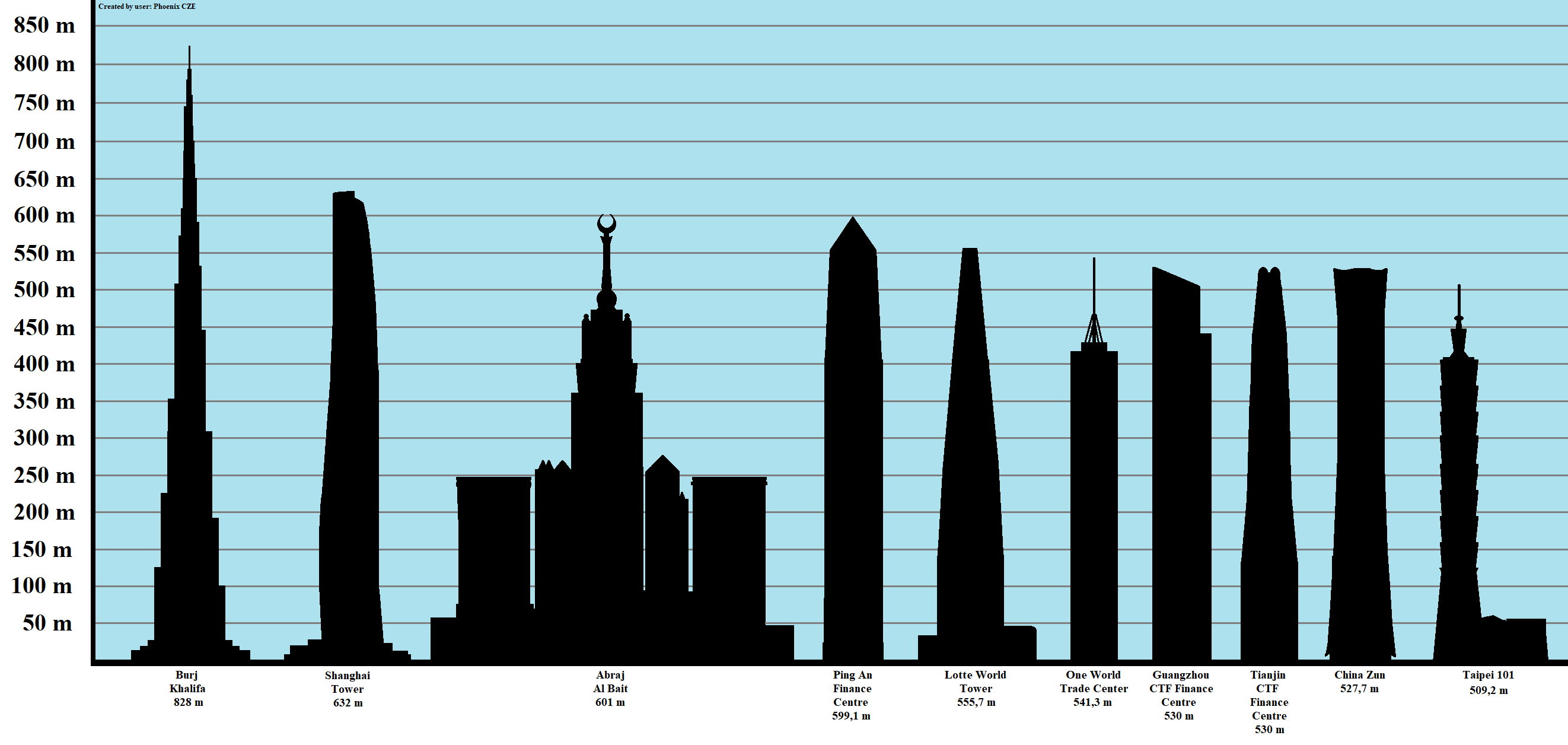
Taipei 101, first from right, compared with other tallest buildings

The double-deck elevators built by the Japanese Toshiba Elevator and Building Systems Corporation (TELC) set a new record in 2004 with the fastest ascending speeds in the world. At 60.6 kilometers (37.7 mi) per hour, 16.83 m (55.22 ft) per second, or 1,010 m/min, the speed of Taipei 101's elevators is 34.7% faster than the previous record holders of the Yokohama Landmark Tower elevator, Yokohama, Japan, which reaches speeds of 12.5 m (41 ft) per second (45 km/h, 28 mph). Taipei 101's elevators transport visitors from the fifth floor to the 89th-floor observatory in 37 seconds. Each elevator features an aerodynamic body, full pressurization, state-of-the art emergency braking systems, and the world's first triple-stage anti-overshooting system. The cost for each elevator is NT$80 million (US$2.4 million). In 2016, the title for the fastest elevator was taken away by the Shanghai Tower in Shanghai. Shortly after, the title for the world's fastest elevator was passed on yet again to the Guangzhou CTF Finance Centre.

=== Artworks ===
Many works of art appear in and around Taipei 101. These include: German artist Rebecca Horn's Dialog between Yin and Yang in 2002 (steel, iron), American artist Robert Indiana's 1-0 in 2002 and Love in 2003 (aluminum), French artist Ariel Moscovici's Between Earth and Sky in 2002 (rose de la claret granite), Taiwanese artist Chung Pu's Global Circle In 2002 (black granite, white marble), British artist Jill Watson's City Composition in 2002 (Bronze), and Taiwanese artist Kang Mu Hsiang's Infinite Life in 2013 (aluminum). Moreover, the Indoor Observatory hosts a regular series of exhibitions. The artists represented have included Wu Ching (gold sculpture), Ping-huang Chang (traditional painting) and Po-lin Chi (aerial photography).

== Floor plan ==
Levels	Purposes	
101	Outdoor Observation Deck (Skyline 460/ Sky Top)	
100	Mechanical	
99	Mechanical	
98	Mechanical	
97	Mechanical	
96	Mechanical	
95	Mechanical	
94	Mechanical	
93	Mechanical	
92	Mechanical	Tuned Mass Damper
91	Outdoor Observatory Deck (Sky Deck)	Tuned Mass Damper
90	Mechanical	Tuned Mass Damper
89	Indoor Observatory Deck (Sky View) / KafeD (Coffee Cafe) / Milksha (Bubble Tea Store) / Taipei 101 Souvenir Shop	Tuned Mass Damper
88	Indoor Observatory Deck (Exit Floor) / Simple Kaffa Sola (Coffee Cafe)	Tuned Mass Damper
87	Mechanical	Tuned Mass Damper
86	Restaurant	A Joy
85	Restaurant	Diamond Tony's 101 Panorama, 85TD
84	High Zone Offices	
83	High Zone Offices	Morgan Stanley
82	High Zone Offices	Mechanical
81	High Zone Offices	Alliance Bernstein
80	High Zone Offices	CARDIF Assurance Vie, Taiwan Branch
79	High Zone Offices	
78	High Zone Offices	CARDIF Assurances Risques Divers, Taiwan Branch
77	High Zone Offices	CIMB Securities Limited
76	High Zone Offices	CIMB Securities Limited, RBS Securities (Room C-D)
75	High Zone Offices	
74	High Zone Offices	Mechanical
73	High Zone Offices	Google
72	High Zone Offices	BNP Paribas
71	High Zone Offices	BNP Paribas
70	High Zone Offices	ING Wholesale Bank
69	High Zone Offices	
68	High Zone Offices	KPMG
67	High Zone Offices	
66	High Zone Offices	Mechanical
65	High Zone Offices	
64	High Zone Offices	
63	High Zone Offices	
62	High Zone Offices	Chien Yeh Law Offices
61	High Zone Offices	Boston Consulting Group (Unit F), Air China, KPMG, Natixis
60	High Zone Offices	Skylobby
59	High Zone Offices	Skylobby
58	Mid Zone Offices	Mechanical
57	Mid Zone Offices	The Executive Centre / Amicorp
56	Mid Zone Offices	
55	Mid Zone Offices	Legg Mason (Suite E), Bayer
54	Mid Zone Offices	Bayer / HSBC Securities (Taiwan) Corporation Limited
53	Mid Zone Offices	Bayer
52	Mid Zone Offices	HRnetOne
51	Mid Zone Offices	Winterthur Life (Taiwan Branch)
50	Mid Zone Offices	Mechanical
49	Mid Zone Offices	S&P Global
48	Mid Zone Offices	Bank of America
47	Mid Zone Offices	McKinsey & Company
46	Mid Zone Offices	Development Dimensions International, Canonical
45	Mid Zone Offices	Perkins Coie (Suite F), Banco Bilbao Vizcaya Argentaria (Unit D)
44	Mid Zone Offices	
43	Mid Zone Offices	Bank of America
42	Mid Zone Offices	Mechanical
41	Mid Zone Offices	
40	Mid Zone Offices	
39	Mid Zone Offices	French Office in Taipei
38	Mid Zone Offices	Volvo
37	Mid Zone Offices	The Executive Centre, Crimson Education, VF Corporation
36	Mid Zone Offices	Skylobby Taipei 101 Conference Center Sui Business Lounge
35	Mid Zone Offices	Skylobby/ Rookie Shumai 35 VEGEtable (Restaurant)
34	Low Zone Offices	Mechanical
33	Low Zone Offices	German Institute Taipei
32	Low Zone Offices	
31	Low Zone Offices	
30	Low Zone Offices	Nomura (Asset Management)
29	Low Zone Offices	Bank of Communications (Taipei Branch)
28	Low Zone Offices	DBS Bank
27	Low Zone Offices	Korn Ferry (Room D-1), Morningstar
26	Low Zone Offices	Mechanical
25	Low Zone Offices	Mechanical
24	Low Zone Offices	Orrick, Herrington & Sutcliffe C-1,
23	Low Zone Offices	L'Oreal
22	Low Zone Offices	L'Oreal
21	Low Zone Offices	PPD, Inc. Unit A,
20	Low Zone Offices	Jones Lang LaSalle
19	Low Zone Offices	
18	Low Zone Offices	Mechanical
17	Low Zone Offices	Mechanical
16	Low Zone Offices	
15	Low Zone Offices	ANZ
14	Low Zone Offices	ANZ
13	Low Zone Offices	Coupang
12	Low Zone Offices	Taiwan Stock Exchange
11	Low Zone Offices	Taiwan Stock Exchange
10	Low Zone Offices	Taiwan Stock Exchange
9	Low Zone Offices	Taiwan Stock Exchange
8	Mechanical	
7	Mechanical	
6	Gymnasium	
5	Taipei 101 Shopping Mall	Taipei 101 Observatory Ticket Entrance
4	Taipei 101 Shopping Mall	
3	Taipei 101 Shopping Mall	
2	Taipei 101 Shopping Mall	Lobby
1	Taipei 101 Shopping Mall	Lobby
B1	Taipei 101 Shopping Mall	Taipei 101/World Trade Center metro station (Exit 4)
B2	Parking Lot	
B3	Parking Lot	
B4	Parking Lot	
B5	Parking Lot	

=== Observation deck ===
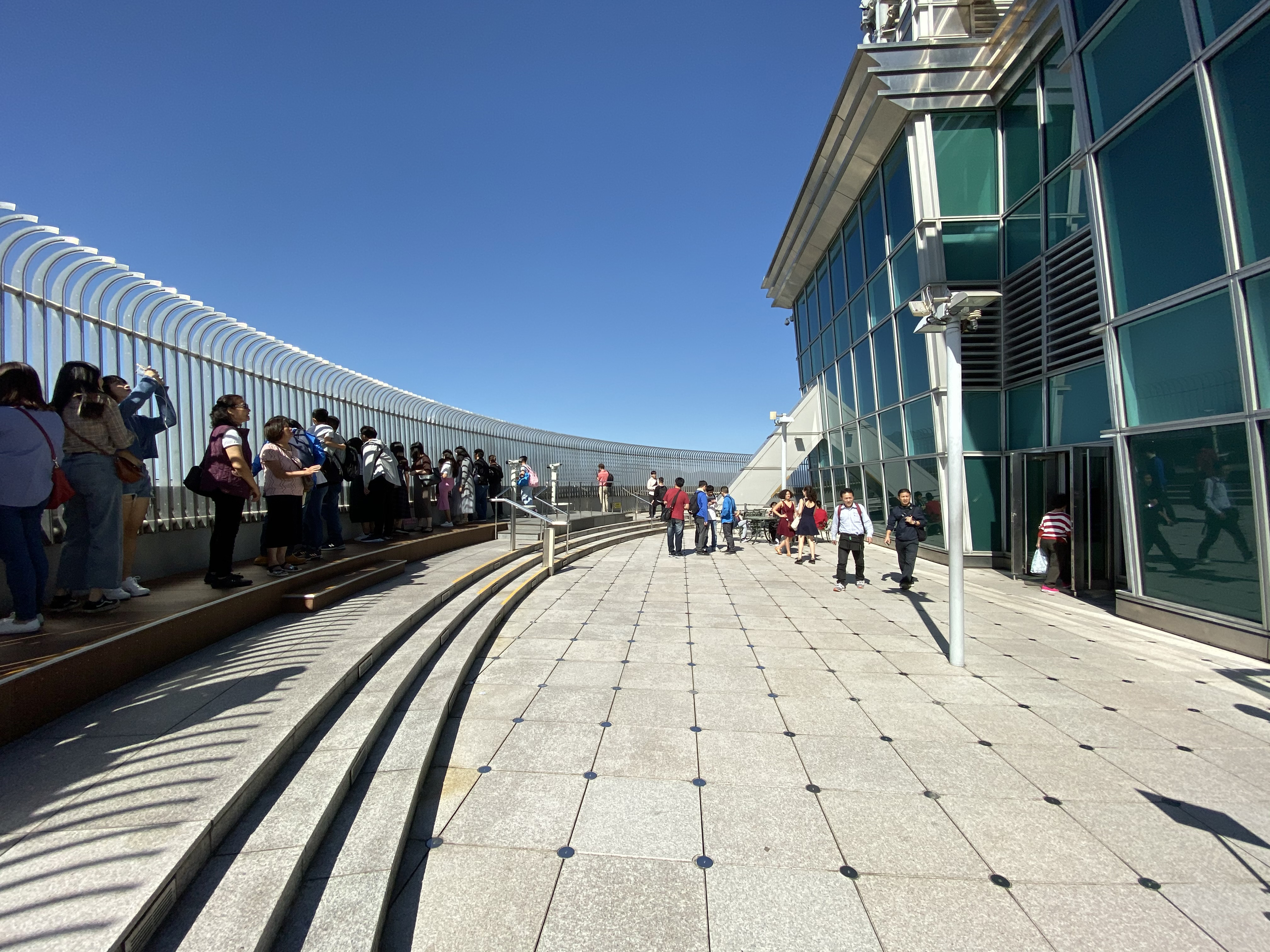
91F outdoor observatory at 391.8 m (1,285 ft)

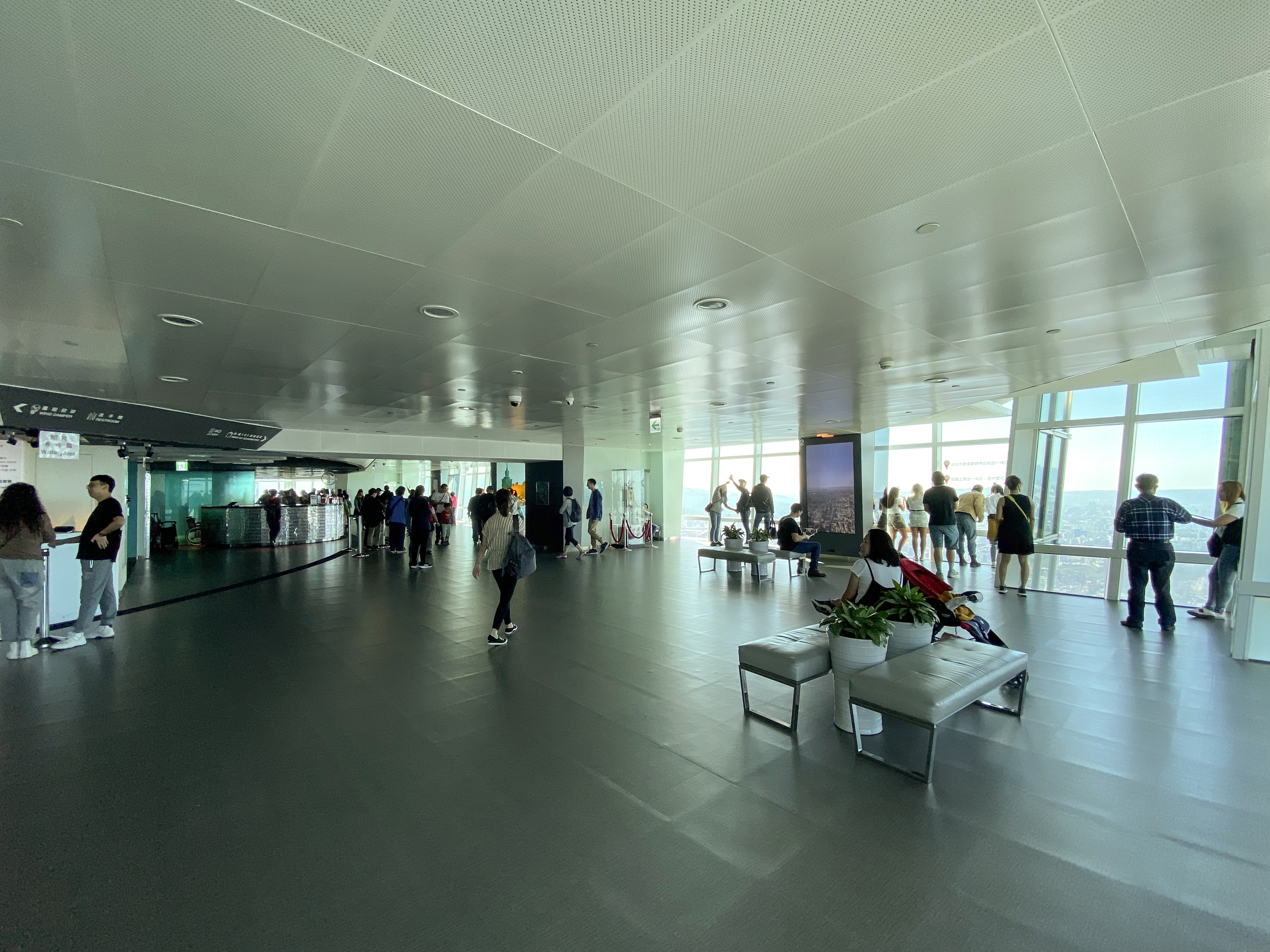
89F indoor observatory

Taipei 101 features an indoor observation deck on the 88th and 89th floors, and two outdoor observation decks (91st floor and 101st floor), all offering 360-degree views and attracting visitors from around the world. The Indoor Observatory stands 383.4 m (1,258 ft) above ground, offering a comfortable environment, large windows with UV protection, recorded voice tours in eight languages, and informative displays and special exhibits. Here, one may view the skyscraper's main damper, which is the world's largest and heaviest visible damper, and buy food, drinks and gift items. Two more flights of stairs take visitors up to the Outdoor Observatory. The Outdoor Observatories, at 391.8 m (1,285 ft) and 449.2 m (1,474 ft) above ground, are the highest such platforms in Taiwan.

The Indoor Observatory is open thirteen hours a day (9:00 am–10:00 pm) throughout the week as well as on special occasions; the Outdoor Observatory is open during the same hours as weather permits. Tickets may be purchased on site in the shopping mall (5th floor) or in advance through the Observatory's website and allow access to the 88th through 91st floors via high-speed elevator.

In 2019, its 101 top floor opened for the first time to the public, starting 14 June with only 36 people given access each day. The 91st-floor observatory used to be the highest floor that open to the public until 14 June 2019 when it was announced by the building's management team that the 101st floor (at 460 meters above sea level) will be opened to the general public, with a quota of 36 people per day and is subject to prior booking. Going onto the outdoor viewing platform requires safety equipment, such as a safety belt buckled to the railing.

== Awards ==
On its opening date, Taipei 101 was awarded the Emporis Skyscraper Award, coming in 1st place. Taipei 101 was awarded the top award platinum rating, by the Leadership in Energy and Environmental Design (LEED), the globally recognized green building ranking system of the U.S. Green Building Council (USGBC), making the skyscraper the tallest energy conservation building in the world. In 2017, Taipei 101 was awarded the Asia Responsible Entrepreneurship Award (AREA). Taipei 101 was awarded the CTBUH Skyscraper Award on the Performance award category.

== See also ==
- List of most expensive buildings
- List of tallest buildings in Taipei
- List of tallest buildings in Taiwan
- List of tourist attractions in Taipei
- Taipei Nan Shan Plaza

== Notes ==
Records
Preceded by Petronas Towers; 451.9 m (1,483 ft)	World's tallest building 509.2 m (1,671 ft); 2004–2009	Succeeded by Burj Khalifa; 829.8 m (2,722 ft)
Preceded by Willis Tower; 442 m (1,450 ft) & 412.4 m (1,353 ft)	World's highest roof & highest occupied floor 449.2 m (1,474 ft) & 439.2 m (1,441 ft); 2003–2008	Succeeded by Shanghai World Financial Center; 492 m (1,614 ft) & 474 m (1,555 ft)
Preceded by Yokohama Landmark Tower; 12.5 m/s (41 ft/s) (45 km/h, 28 mph)	World's fastest elevator 16.83 m/s (55.22 ft/s) (60.6 km/h, 37.7 mph); 2003–2016	Succeeded by Shanghai Tower; 20.5 m/s (67.26 ft/s) (73.8 km/h, 45.9 mph)
Preceded by Tuntex Sky Tower; 347.5 m (1,140 ft)	Tallest building in Taiwan; 509.2 m (1,671 ft); 2004–present	Incumbent
Preceded by Bank of America Tower	World's tallest & highest-use green building (LEED platinum rating); 2011–present	Incumbent
Preceded by Environmental Protection Agency building (Florida, U.S.)	World's largest green building (LEED platinum rating); 2011–present	Incumbent
Unknown	World's largest & heaviest wind damper diameter 5.5 m (18 ft) & 660 metric tons (728 short tons); 2003–present	Incumbent
Unknown	World's tallest building of earthquake hotspot (platinum rating); 2003–present	Incumbent
