= Montbel, Ariège =

Commune in Occitanie, France

Montbel
- Commune
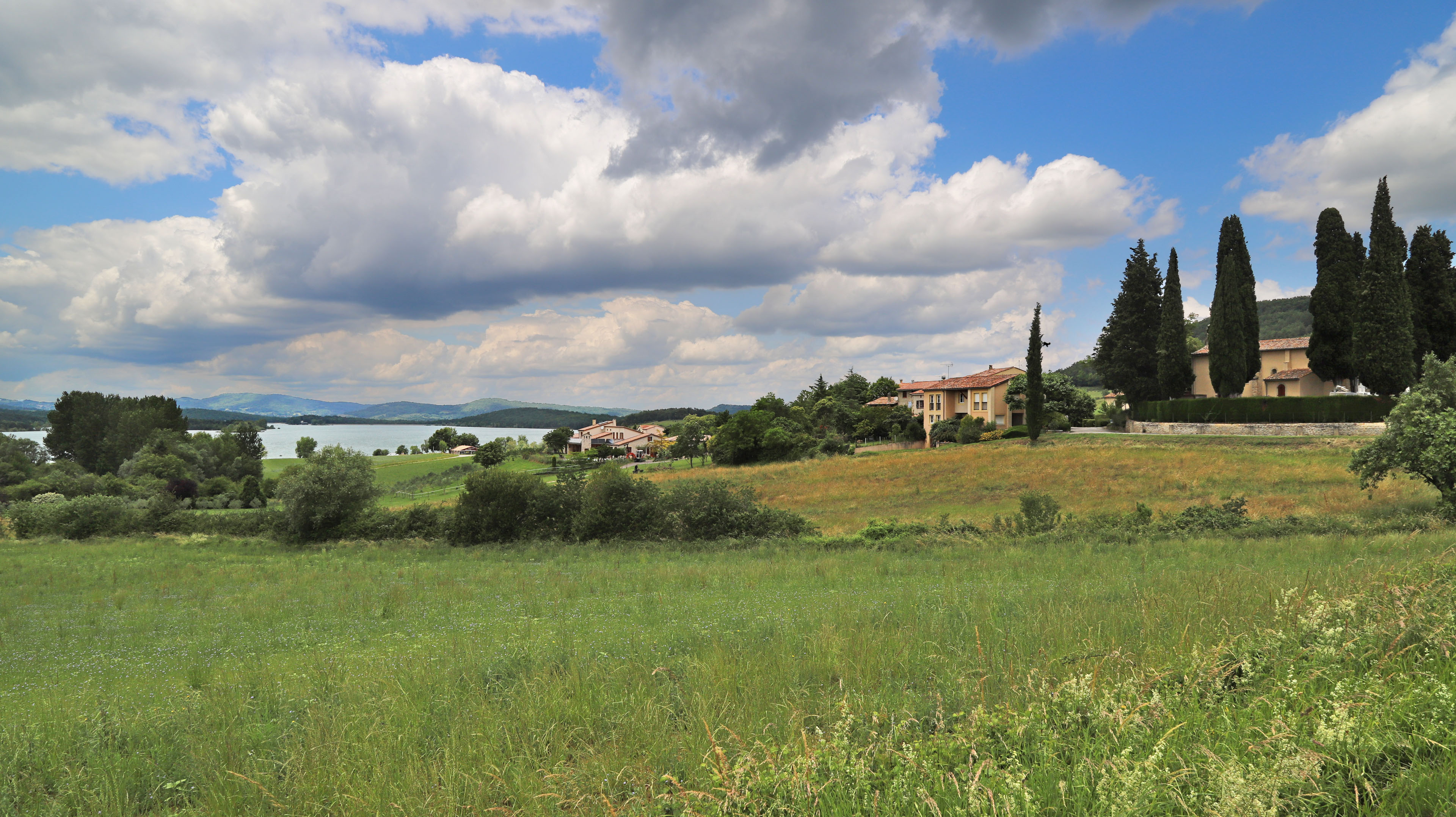
- Montbel in 2020

- Coat of arms
- Location of Montbel
- Location within France Location within Occitanie
- Coordinates: 42°58′37″N 1°58′39″E
- Country: France
- Region: Occitania
- Department: Ariège
- Arrondissement: Pamiers
- Canton: Mirepoix
- Intercommunality: Pays de Mirepoix

Government
  - Mayor (2020–2026): Pierre Terpant
- Area^{1}: 17.36 km^{2} (6.70 sq mi)
- Elevation: 410 m (1,350 ft)
- Highest elevation: 587 m (1,926 ft)
- Lowest elevation: 345 m (1,132 ft)
- Population (2023): 99
  - Density: 5.7/km^{2} (15/sq mi)
- Time zone: UTC+01:00 (CET)
  - Summer (DST): UTC+02:00 (CEST)
- INSEE/Postal code: 09200 /09600
- ^{1} French Land Register data, which excludes lakes, ponds, glaciers > 1 km^{2} (0.386 sq mi or 247 acres) and river estuaries.

Montbel (French pronunciation: [mɔ̃bɛl]; Occitan: Montbèl) is a commune in the Ariège department in southwestern France.

== Population ==
Historical population
Year	Pop.	±% p.a.
1968	113	—
1975	115	+0.25%
1982	110	−0.63%
1990	109	−0.11%
1999	123	+1.35%
2007	106	−1.84%
2012	116	+1.82%
2017	110	−1.06%
2023	99	−1.74%
Source: INSEE

== See also ==
- Communes of the Ariège department
