= West Los Angeles =

- Neighborhood
- Location within the Westside region of Los Angeles County
- Coordinates: 34.04639°N 118.44722°W
- Country: United States
- State: California
- County: Los Angeles
- City: Los Angeles

West Los Angeles is an area within the city of Los Angeles, California, United States. The residential and commercial neighborhood is divided by the Interstate 405 freeway, and each side is sometimes treated as a distinct neighborhood, mapped differently by different sources. Each lies within the larger Westside region of Los Angeles County.

== Geography ==
=== West Los Angeles Community Plan ===
The West Los Angeles Community Plan area recognized by the city of Los Angeles is generally bounded by Centinela Avenue on the west; Wilshire Boulevard and Santa Monica Boulevard on the north; National Boulevard, Pico Boulevard, and Exposition Boulevard on the south; and Durango Avenue, Robertson Boulevard, and Canfield Avenue on the east. Among the neighborhoods included within it are Sawtelle, Rancho Park, Beverlywood, Cheviot Hills, Castle Heights, and Century City. The Community Plan area itself is part of the larger West Los Angeles Area Plan Commission area (i.e., the Westside region).

=== Automobile Club of Southern California ===
The Automobile Club of Southern California does not mark boundaries on its map, but centers the neighborhood of West Los Angeles proper as south of Santa Monica Boulevard, west of Interstate 405, north of Olympic Boulevard and east of Barrington Avenue. The borders of the official West Los Angeles Neighborhood Council correspond closely to this definition. Specifically, its district stretches from the 405 freeway in the east to Centinela Avenue in the west and Wilshire Boulevard in the north and the 10 freeway in the south. This is roughly the same area labeled as "Sawtelle" in the Mapping L.A. website of the Los Angeles Times.

=== Los Angeles Times ===
In 2003, a Los Angeles Times correspondent noted:

The meaning of the term West Los Angeles varies widely. Some use it to describe the entire Westside including Santa Monica, Venice and stretching east to Western Avenue. More precisely, though, it is the portion of incorporated Los Angeles between the Santa Monica city limits on the west, Wilshire Boulevard on the north, Century City to the east and extending just beyond National Boulevard on the south. Sections of West L.A. run the gamut from stylish Cheviot Hills to a cluster of generic homes east of Bundy Drive.

That report on the meaning of West Los Angeles also included Rancho Park, located at Pico and Beverly Glen, and the Westdale Trousdale area near National Boulevard and Barrington Avenue.

=== City of Los Angeles ===
The 2004 City of Los Angeles & Communities map by the Los Angeles Almanac shows West Los Angeles as a neighborhood south of Santa Monica Boulevard and north of Culver City. West Los Angeles is book-ended with Mid-City, Mid-City West and Mid-Wilshire on the east and Sawtelle on the west. Century City, Rancho Park, and Cheviot Hills are shown (without boundaries) as sub-neighborhoods in West Los Angeles.

Together, the areas east and west of Sepulveda Boulevard/I-405 comprise a large portion of the official West Los Angeles Community Plan area.

=== Frommer's Guide ===
The Frommer's Guide described West Los Angeles as "a label that generally applies to everything that isn't one of the other Westside neighborhoods." It lies "south of Santa Monica Boulevard, north of Venice Boulevard, east of Santa Monica and Venice, and west and south of Century City.

=== Mapping L.A. ===
In 2009, the Los Angeles Times Mapping L.A. project defined West Los Angeles as south of Santa Monica Boulevard, west of Beverly Glen Boulevard, north of Pico Boulevard and east of Sepulveda Boulevard. Profiling the neighborhood in 2018, the Times described it as follows:

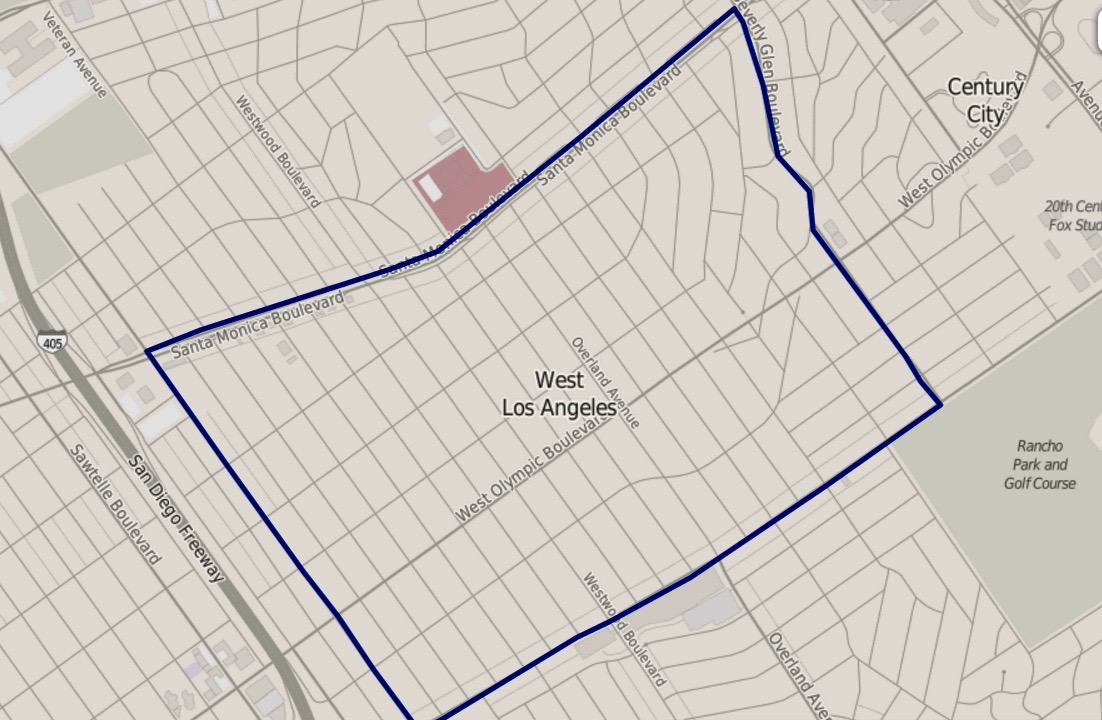
West Los Angeles as defined by the Los Angeles Times

Nowadays, West L.A. is a marooned rump of the once-mighty West Los Angeles of old, which stretched from Century City to the Santa Monica city limits, and which has atomized over the years into a handful of disparate neighborhoods. ... Many people assume West Los Angeles refers to all that lies between the sea and Robertson Boulevard (or wherever their own arbitrary border of central Los Angeles lies). But it is its own place, not just a toponym to be used interchangeably with "the Westside."

== Demographics ==
For the area west of the 405 freeway, Mapping L.A. gives the population of the 2.69-square-mile Sawtelle neighborhood as 35,844 according to the 2000 U.S. census, with a rise to 38,698 in 2008 as estimated by the Los Angeles Department of City Planning. Its density of 13,319 people per square mile, about was average for the city of Los Angeles but among the highest densities for the county. The percentage of Asian people is high for the county and the area is highly diverse compared to both City of Los Angeles and County of Los Angeles averages. Mexico (29.0%) and Iran (13.8%) are the most common foreign places of birth. 49.8% of residents 25 and older have a four-year degree, which is high for the city of Los Angeles and high for the county. The percentages of never married males and never married females are among the county's highest.

For the area east of the 405 freeway, Mapping L.A. gives the population of the 1.05-square-mile neighborhood as 12,659 according to the 2000 U.S. census, with a rise to 13,582 in 2008 as estimated by the Los Angeles Department of City Planning. Its density of 12,061 people was about average for the city of Los Angeles. 76.7% of residents were non-Hispanic white, 11.4% were Asian-American; 5.3% were Hispanic or Latino of any race; 2.3% were African American and 4.1% identified themselves with other or mixed race categories.

The median household income in east Mapping L.A. area was $86,403 in 2008 dollars, which was considered high for both the city and the county. The percentage of households earning $125,000 and up was high for the county. Median age of residents was 38, old compared with other locality in the city and the county. The average household size was 1.9, low for both the city and the county. 51% of residents rented their living quarters, and 49% owned them. The percentage of widowed men and women was among the county's highest. Iranian and Russian were the most common ancestries.

The east Mapping L.A. area was highly educated, with 60.4% of residents 25 and older holding a four-year degree, a higher ratio than found in the rest of the city or the county.

=== Homeless population ===
In 2022, there were 412 homeless individuals in West Los Angeles.

== Enclaves ==
Neighborhoods include:

- Beverlywood
- Castle Heights
- Century City
- Cheviot Hills
- Crestview
- Faircrest Heights
- La Cienega Heights
- Reynier Village
- Pico-Robertson
- Carthay Square
- Little Ethiopia
- Picfair Village
- South Carthay
- Westwood
- Wilshire Vista
- Rancho Park

== Government and infrastructure ==
The Los Angeles County Department of Health Services SPA 5 West Area Health Office serves West Los Angeles.

=== Emergency services ===
Los Angeles Police Department operates the West Los Angeles Community Police Station at 1663 Butler Avenue. Los Angeles Fire Department Station 59 at 11505 W. Olympic Boulevard serves the area.

== Education ==
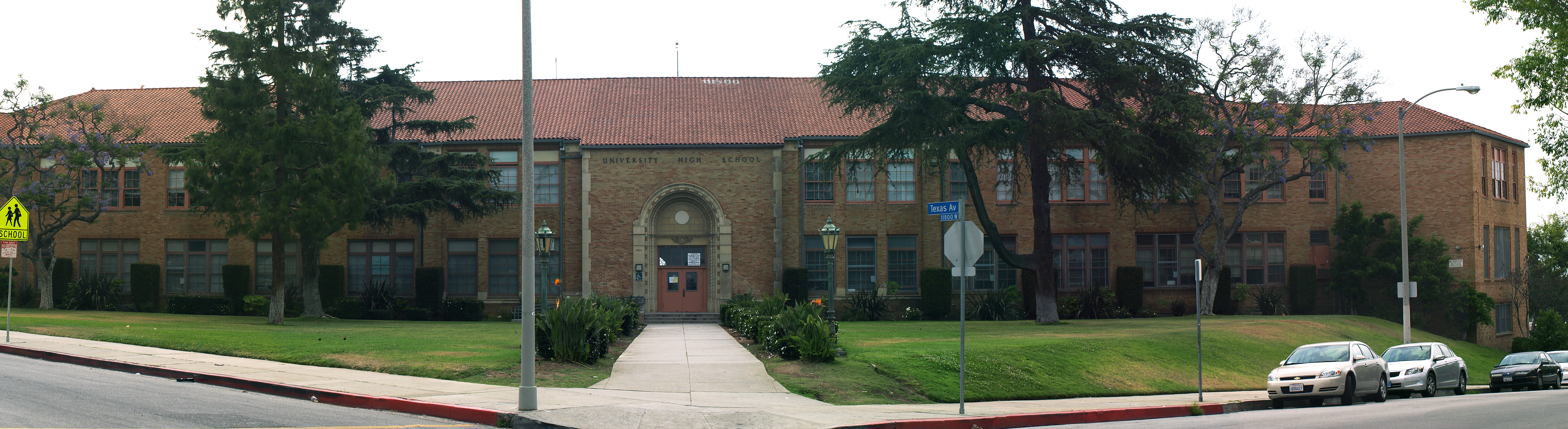
University High School

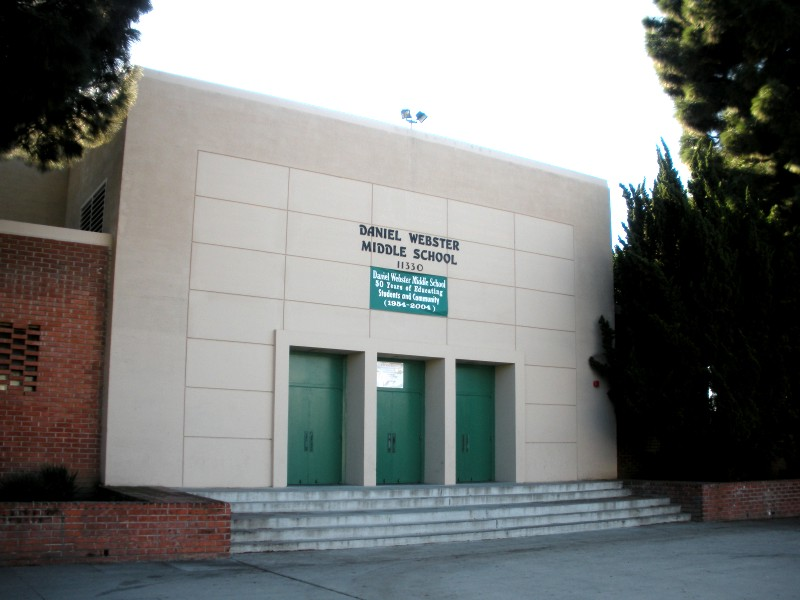
Daniel Webster Middle School

=== Primary and secondary schools ===
==== Public schools ====
West Los Angeles is part of the Los Angeles Unified School District. Neighborhood elementary schools are Brockton Avenue, Canfield Elementary School, Castle Heights Elementary School, Charnock Road Elementary School, Cheviot Hills Continuation School, Clover Avenue Elementary School, Crescent Heights Boulevard Elementary School, Nora Sterry Elementary School, Overland Elementary School, Shenandoah Street Elementary School and Warner Avenue. Middle schools are Emerson, Palms, and Webster. High schools are Hamilton High School, Los Angeles Center for Enriched Studies, University High School and Indian Springs Continuation, both on the same site.

==== Private schools ====
YULA High School, Yeshivat Ohr Chanoch Boys High School, Vista School, Temple Issiah Preschool and Kindergarten, Saint Sebastian School, St. Mary Magdalen Elementary School, Rabbi Jacob Pressman Academy, Lycee Francais de Los Angeles, Bais Chaya Mushka Chabad, West Los Angeles Baptist School and First Lutheran School of Venice are nearby private schools. Pacific States University in the Harvard Heights area is a graduate and undergraduate college.

=== Public libraries ===
The Los Angeles Public Library operates the West Los Angeles Regional Library.

== Parks and recreation ==
The Stoner Recreation Center is situated in the area. The center includes a waterpark, barbecue pits, a lighted baseball diamond, lighted outdoor basketball courts, a children's play area, a lighted football field, an indoor gymnasium without weights and a capacity of 300 people, picnic tables, a lighted soccer field, lighted tennis courts, and lighted volleyball courts. The Annual Cherry Blossom Festival, co-sponsored by the West Los Angeles Japanese American Community Center, is held at the park. Other parks and recreations in the area are Cheviot Hills Park, Rancho Park Golf Course and Reynier Park. Sawtelle Boulevard has become one of the most prominent food streets in the city and the entire 90025 ZIP code, encompassing both sides of the 405 freeway, is undergoing more teardowns of old residences than anywhere other in the city.

== Media ==
Fox Broadcasting Company maintains studio operations on South Bundy Drive for local stations KTTV and KCOP-TV, as well as national Fox Sports programming. West Los Angeles is also home to The Village recording studio, which has been used for musical projects including albums, motion picture and television soundtracks, and radio programming.

== Notable people ==
- Nikki Reed, actress
- David Avadon, illusionist
- Pat Doyle, baseball coach
- Juliet Landau, actress
- Geoff Schwartz, NFL football player
- Mitchell Schwartz, NFL football player
- Pat Smear, guitarist for the Foo Fighters, Germs, and Nirvana
- Roozbeh Farahanipour, West Los Angeles Chamber of Commerce CEO
