= Mid City, Los Angeles =

Mid City
- Neighborhood of Los Angeles
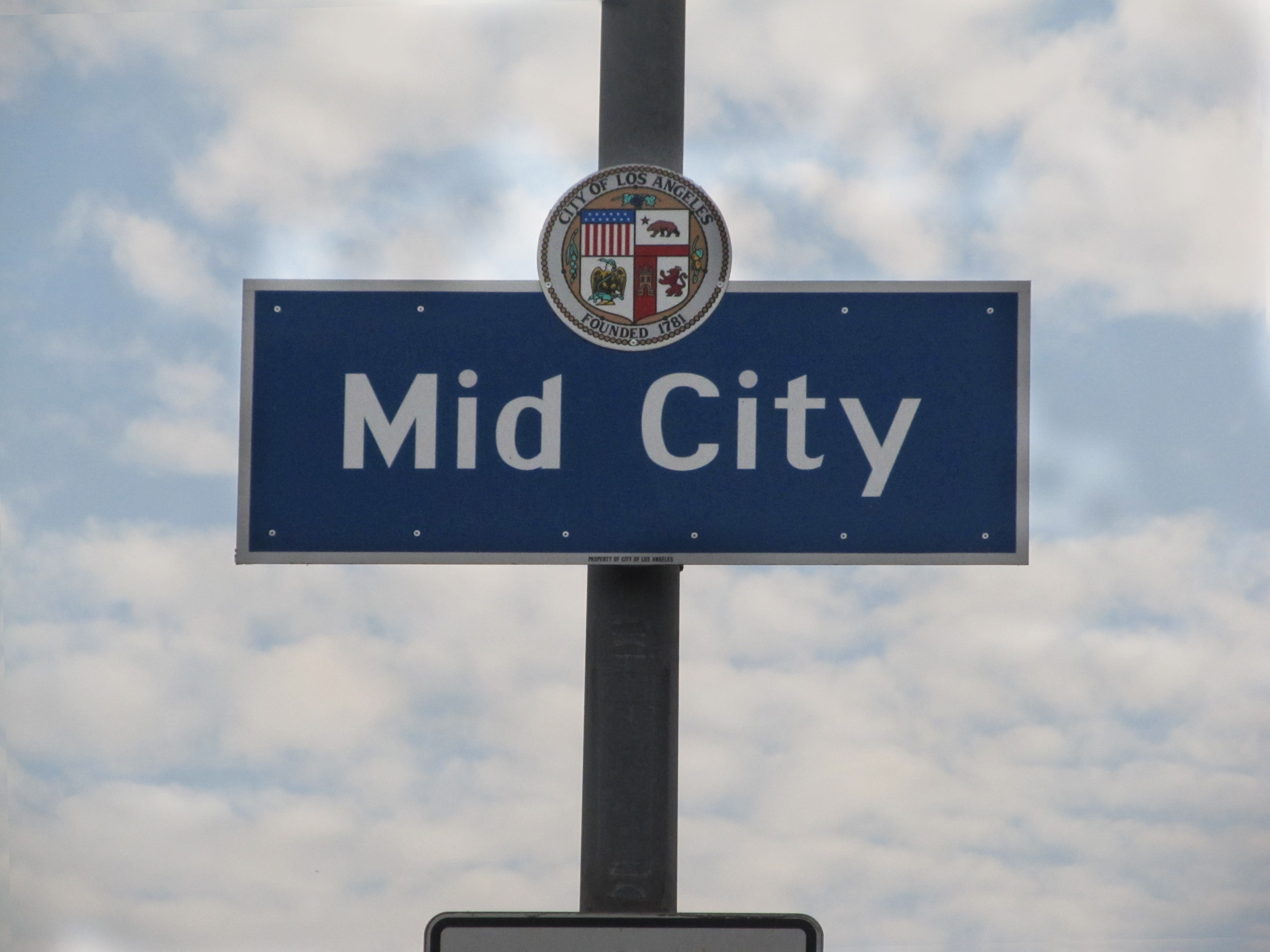
- Mid City neighborhood sign located at the intersection of La Brea Avenue and the Santa Monica Freeway

- Location within Los Angeles
- Coordinates: 34°02′45″N 118°20′43″W
- Country: United States of America
- State: California
- County: Los Angeles
- Time zone: Pacific
- Zip Code: 90016 & 90019
- Area code: 323

Mid City (also Mid-City) is a neighborhood in Central Los Angeles, California.

Attractions include restaurants and a post office named for singer Ray Charles, who had his recording studio in Mid City. The neighborhood hosts eleven public and private schools. A northern extension of the K Line from north-south is proposed to serve this area.

== Geography ==
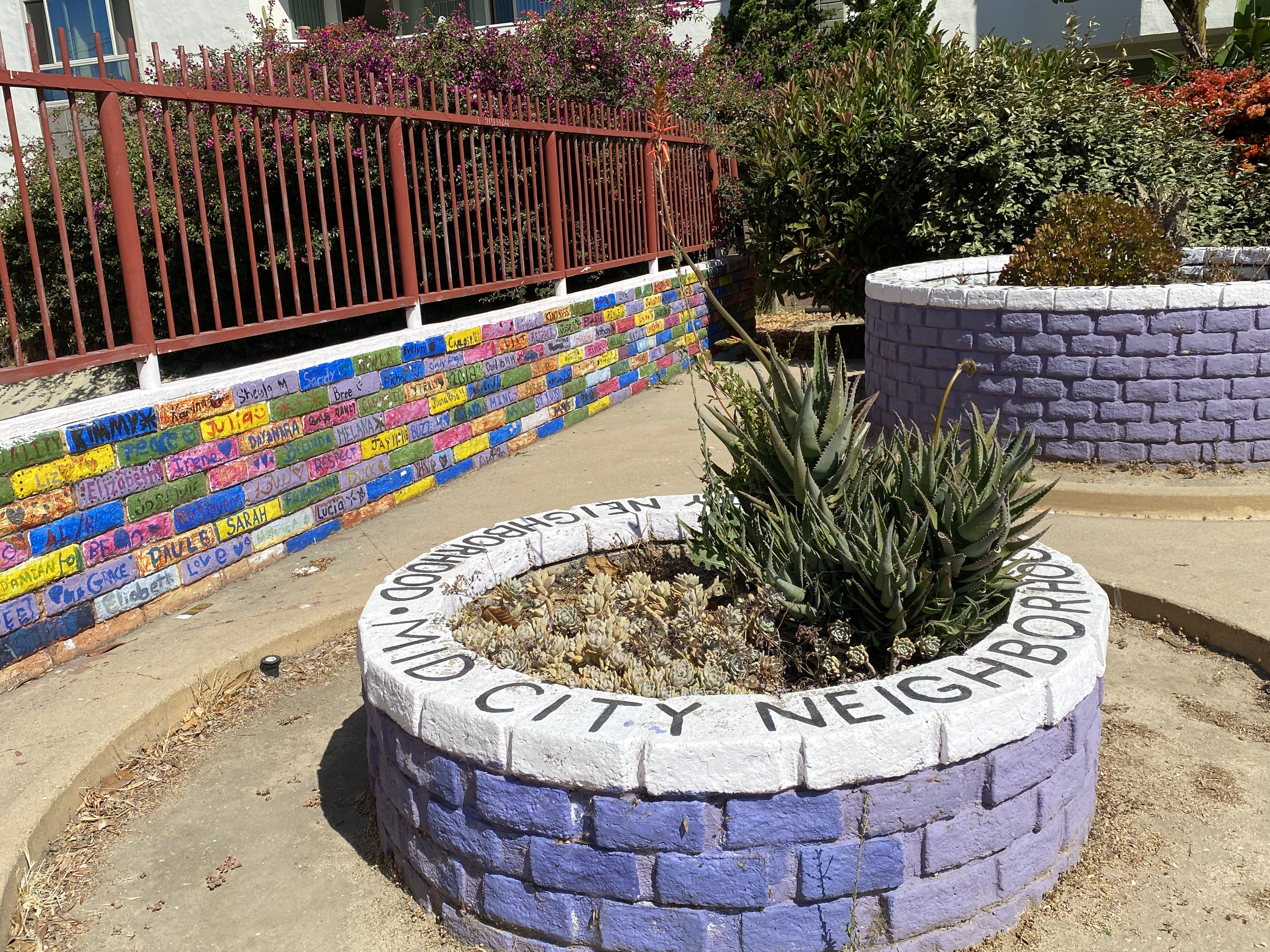
Mid City Neighborhood planter decoration at Burnside Avenue crossing of Ballona Creek, Los Angeles, California

=== City of Los Angeles boundaries ===
The City of Los Angeles Department of Transportation has posted Mid City signage to mark the area. City installed signs are at the following intersections (from east to west): Hoover Street and Washington Boulevard, Vermont Avenue and Pico Boulevard, Western Avenue and Pico Boulevard, Normandie Avenue and the Santa Monica Freeway, and La Brea Avenue and the Santa Monica Freeway.

=== Google Maps ===
Google Maps outlines an area labeled "Mid City" that roughly runs from Hoover Street on the east to La Cienega Boulevard and Robertson Boulevard on the west. The north is roughly bordered by Olympic Boulevard, and the Santa Monica Freeway is on the south. (Note: Where other reliable sources are available for the boundaries of neighborhoods, they should be treated preferentially to Google Maps and Google Street View. It is difficult if not impossible to verify as they are subject to change and documentation and archives are not available.)

=== Mapping L.A. boundaries ===
The Mapping L.A. project of the Los Angeles Times states as follows:

Mid City is bounded on the north by Pico Boulevard, on the east by Crenshaw Boulevard, on the south by the Santa Monica Freeway, on the southwest by Washington and National boulevards, on the west by Robertson Boulevard and on the northwest by Cadillac Avenue and La Cienega Boulevard.

It is flanked by Carthay and Mid-Wilshire to the north, Arlington Heights to the east, Culver City and West Adams to the south, Palms to the southwest, Beverlywood to the west and Pico-Robertson to the northwest.

=== Ballona Creek ===
Three bridges in Mid-City cross over Ballona Creek, at Hauser Boulevard, Burnside Avenue and Thurman Avenue.

== Demographics ==
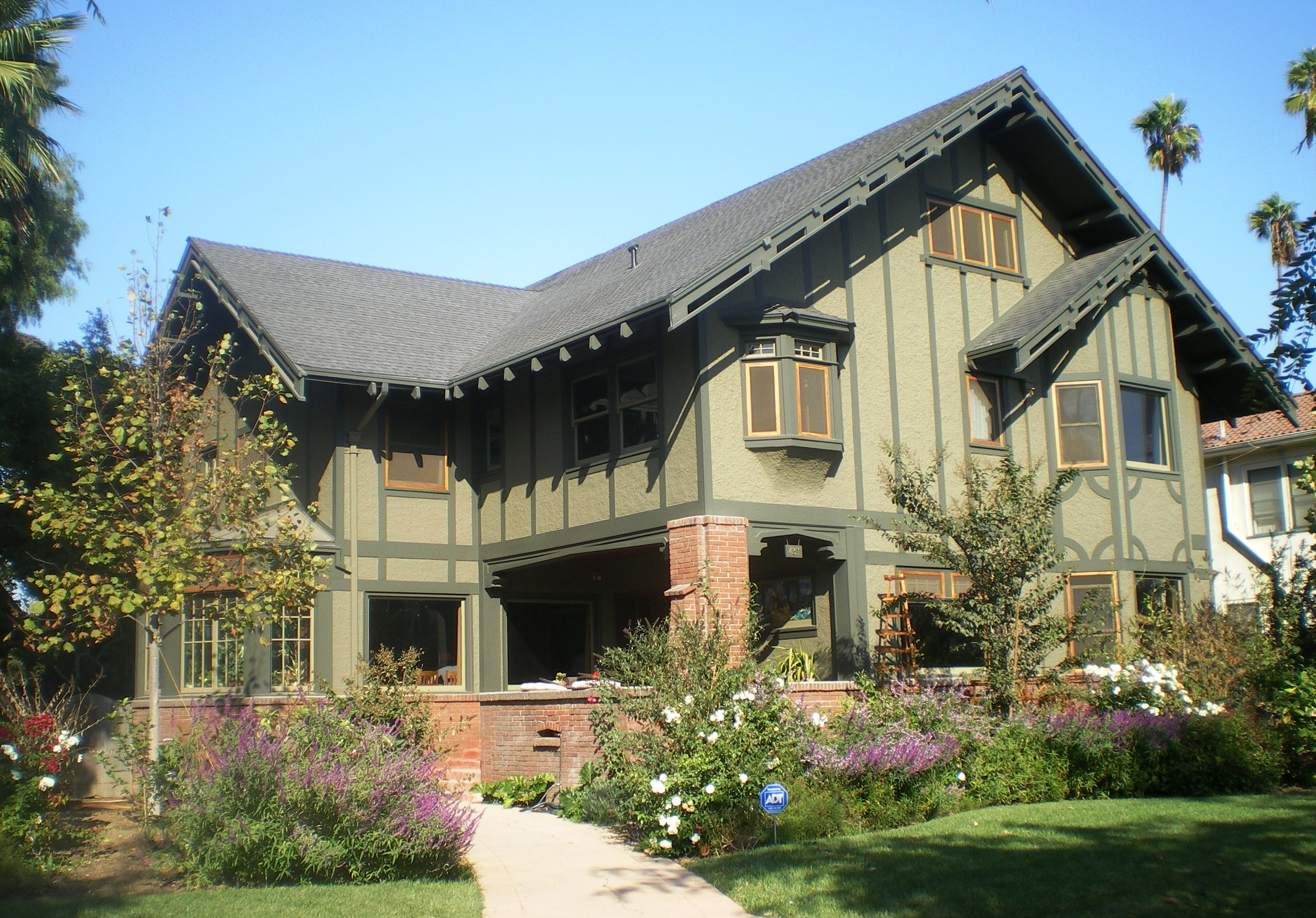
The Holmes-Shannon House in Victoria Park was built in 1911.

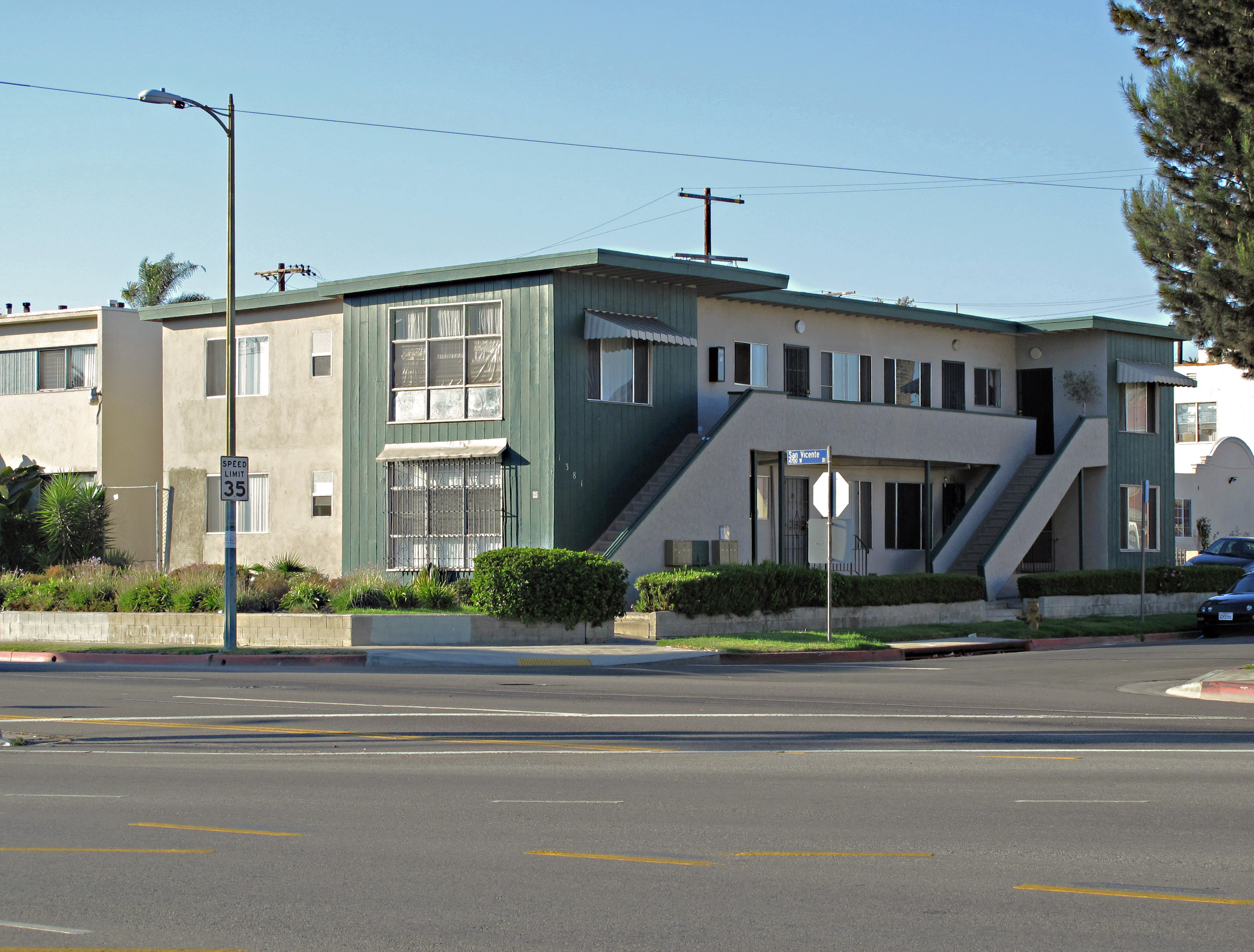
Apartment building at San Vicente and Pico boulevards

The 2000 U.S. census counted 52,197 residents in the 3.47-square-mile neighborhood—an average of 15,051 people per square mile, among the highest population densities in Los Angeles County. In 2008, the city estimated that the population had increased to 55,016. The median age for residents was 31, about average for both the city and the county.

Mid City was said to be "highly diverse" when compared to the city at large, with a diversity index of 0.637. The ethnic breakdown in 2000 was: 45.2% Latino, 38.3% Black, 9.5% Non-Hispanic White, 3.9% Asian, and 3.1% of other groups. Mexico (46%) and El Salvador (15.6%) were the most common places of birth for the 35.1% of the residents who were born abroad, a figure that was considered average for the city and county.

The median household income in 2008 dollars was $43,711, considered average for the city. The percentage of households earning $20,000 or less was high, compared to the county at large. The average household size of 2.8 people was just about average for Los Angeles. Renters occupied 68.9% of the housing units, and home- or apartment owners the rest.

The percentages of never-married men (43.2%) and never-married women (35%) were among the county's highest. The census found 2,748 families headed by single parents, the 23.4% rate being considered high for both the city and the county.

Mid City residents aged 25 and older holding a four-year degree amounted to 16.8% of the population in 2000, about average for both the city and the county.

== Neighborhoods ==
Neighborhoods within Mid-City include:

- Arlington Heights
- Brookside
- Crestview
- Lafayette Square
- Little Ethiopia
- Mid-City Heights
- Picfair Village
- Faircrest Heights
- La Cienega Heights
- Reynier Village
- Victoria Park
- Wellington Square

== Transportation ==
Crenshaw Corridor and regional setting. Dashed lines represent possible extensions or alignments. Click to enlarge.

=== Electric railways (-1960s) ===
Mid City was a key junction and terminus in the days of the electric railways from the early 1900s through the end of service in 1963.

The Rimpau Loop in Mid City was an important terminus of the Los Angeles Railway ("Yellow Cars") streetcars. The Pico Blvd. city streetcar line "P" turned around here in the Rimpau Loop. From here, Santa Monica city buses ran to Downtown Santa Monica, and to this day, Pico and Rimpau is the terminus for several Santa Monica Transit lines.

Vineyard Junction in Mid City was where Pacific Electric "Red Car" lines converged. The lines ran from Downtown Los Angeles south to Venice Boulevard, then West along Venice to Vineyard Junction. From here they went along Venice Blvd. to Venice and Redondo Beach; while others went along San Vicente Blvd. northwest toward what is now West Hollywood as well as via Beverly Hills to Santa Monica. It was the site of an accident on July 13, 1913, in which two wooden streetcars crashed into each other, with 14 people dead and 200 people injured. As a result, the Pacific Electric ordered its future cars to be made of steel, and it was recommended that signaling be introduced on the PE's lines.

=== Today ===
As part of their long-range plans, the Los Angeles County MTA has proposed an extension of the K Line, which would place a rail transit station in Mid City. The proposed rail stop is at the intersection of Pico and San Vicente Boulevards—site of the old Vineyard Junction.

The old Vineyard Junction site is now occupied by the end terminal for the Santa Monica Big Blue Bus.

The K Line would allow Mid City residents to easy access to the city's east/west rail lines: the D Line along Wilshire Boulevard, the E Line from East and Downtown Los Angeles to Downtown Santa Monica, and the C Line from Norwalk to Redondo Beach and soon near LAX.

Currently, the Mid City alignment is unfunded and part of the K Line's proposed northern extension.

== Landmarks and attractions ==
Ray Charles Post Office

- Nate Holden Performing Arts Center – 4718 W. Washington Boulevard. The center is the home of the Ebony Repertory Theater Company.
- The Del Mar Theater – 5036 W. Pico Boulevard. The theater's blue and yellow neon facade was re-lit in 2003 as part of the non-profit "Pico Revitalization Project".
- The Comedy Union – 5040 W. Pico Boulevard. The Comedy Union is a comedy club that showcases black comedians.
- Midtown Crossing, a retail power center on the site of the former large Sears store (1930s–1990s) at Pico and Rimpau
- The Mint – 6010 W. Pico Boulevard. The Mint is a music club that was established in 1937. Past performers include Macy Gray, The Wallflowers, and Natalie Cole.
- Beth Chayim Chadashim – 6090 W. Pico Boulevard. Recognized by the Los Angeles Conservancy for its "cultural significance" as the world's first lesbian and gay synagogue
- Rocha House - 2400 Shenandoah Street. The city's 13th Los Angeles Historic-Cultural Monument.
- Roscoe's House of Chicken and Waffles – 1865 S. La Brea Avenue. The local branch of the restaurant chain.
- United States Post Office, Ray Charles Station – 4960 W. Washington Boulevard. In 2005, an existing post office was renamed in honor of singer Ray Charles.

== Parks and recreation ==
- Eleanor Green Roberts Aquatic Center - 4526 W. Pico Boulevard
- Gladys Jean Wesson Park - 2508 West Boulevard
- Mascot Park - 4665 Pickford Street
- Vineyard Recreation Center - 2942 Vineyard Avenue
- Washington Irving Pocket Park - 4103 W. Washington Boulevard

== Education ==
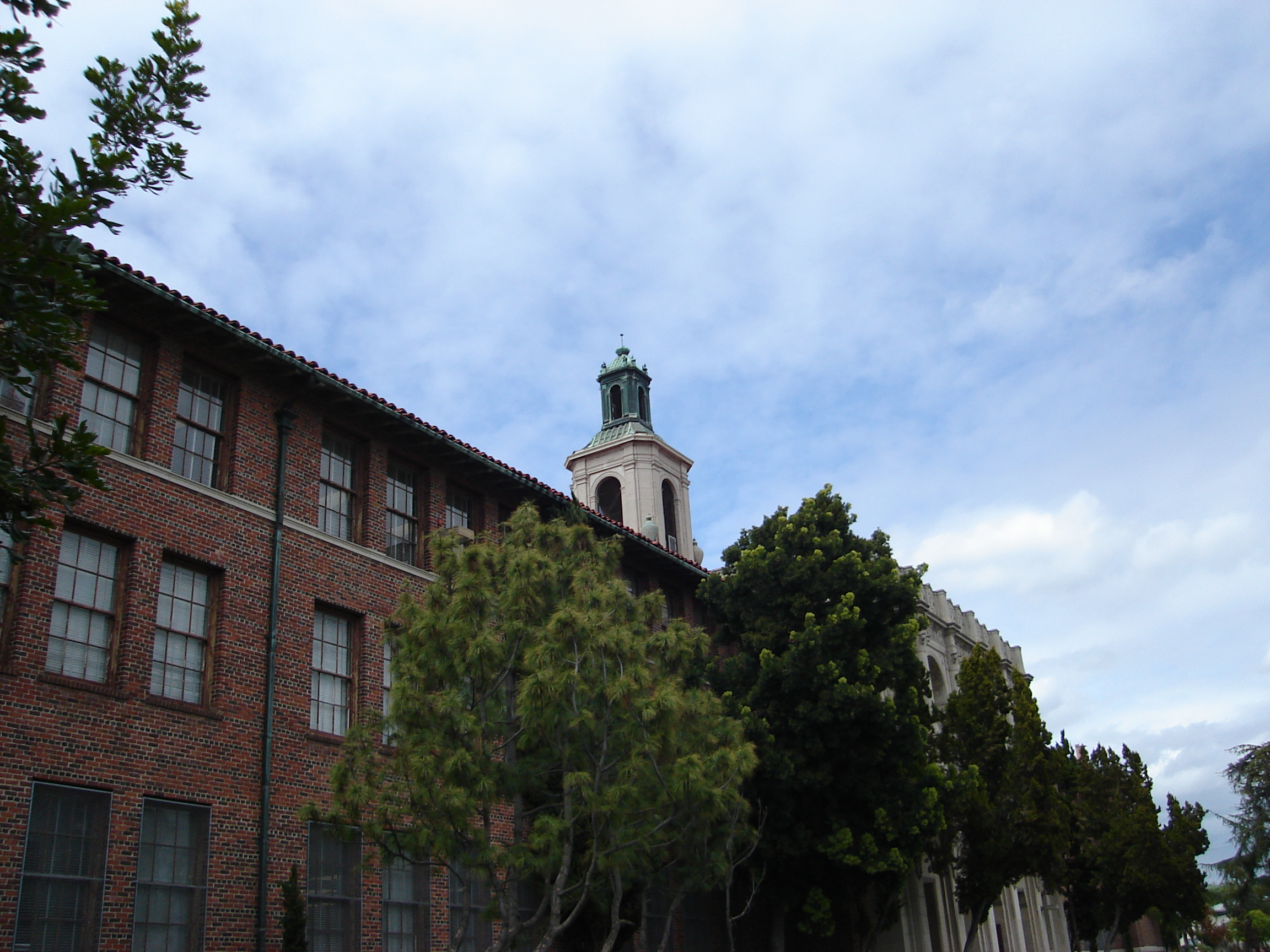
Alexander Hamilton High School

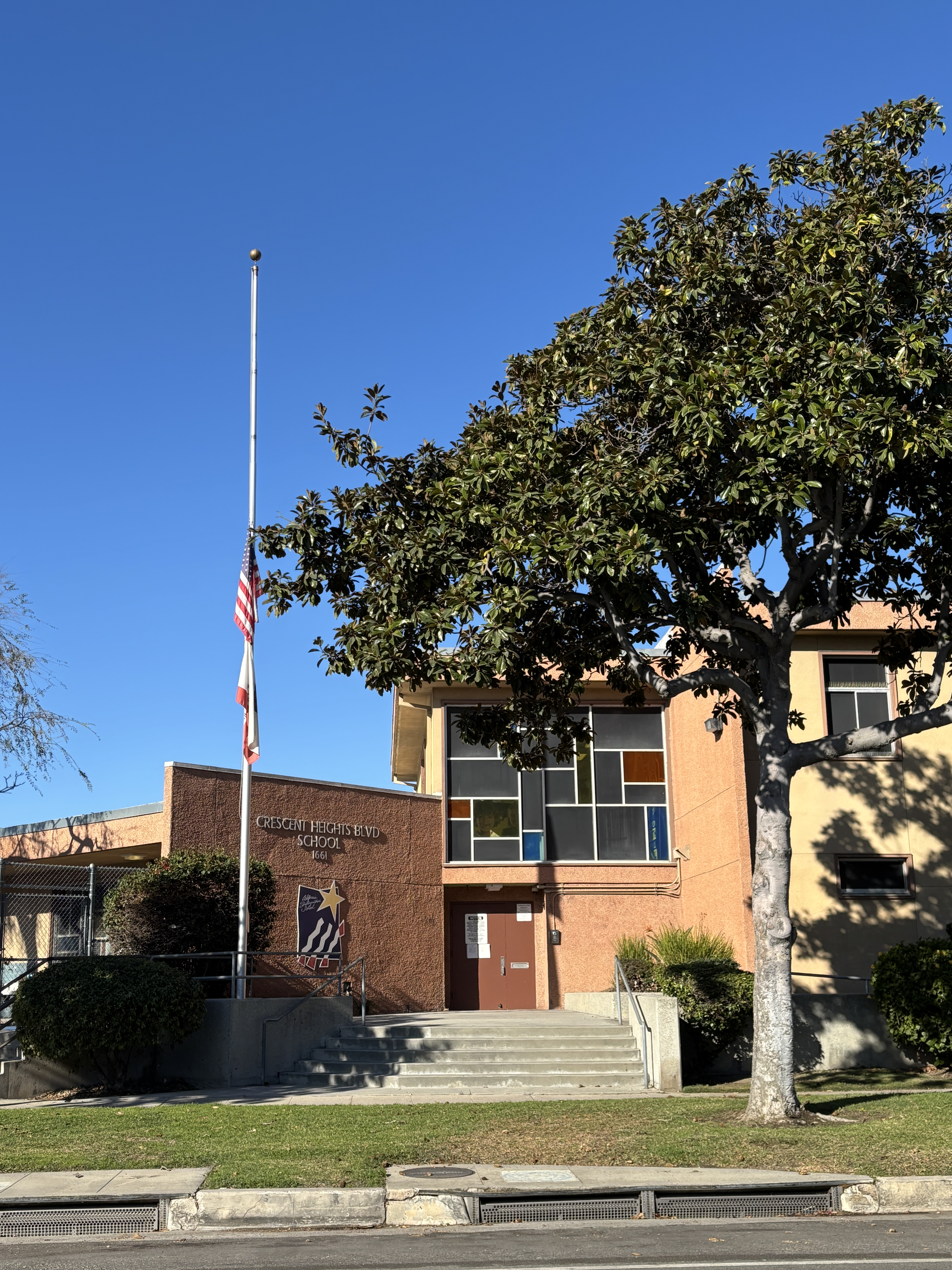
Crescent Heights Boulevard Elementary Language Arts Social Justice Magnet 1661 S. Crescent Heights Blvd. Los Angeles, CA 90035 United States

The Los Angeles Unified School District (LAUSD) operates public schools:

=== High school ===
- Hamilton High School - 2955 Robertson Boulevard
- Los Angeles High School - 4650 W Olympic Boulevard
- Los Angeles Center for Enriched Studies - 5931 West 18th Street

=== Elementary school ===
- Alta Loma Elementary School - 1745 Vineyard Avenue
- Cienega Elementary School - 2611 S Orange Drive
- Crescent Heights Boulevard Elementary School, alternative school - 1661 South Crescent Heights Boulevard
- Futuro College Preparatory Elementary School, LAUSD charter - 3838 Rosemead Avenue
- Marvin Avenue Elementary School - 2411 S Marvin Avenue
- Saturn Street Elementary School, 5360 Saturn Street
- Shenandoah Street Elementary School - 2450 Shenandoah Street
- Virginia Road Elementary School - 2925 Virginia Road

== Notable residents ==
- Blueface
- Charles Bukowski - 2122 S. Longwood Avenue in Mid-City Heights
- Harold Harby - 2642 S. Halm Avenue in Reynier Village
- Alfred St. John - 4300 Victoria Park Drive in Victoria Park
- Earl Sweatshirt
