= Reynier Village, Los Angeles =

- Neighborhood of Los Angeles
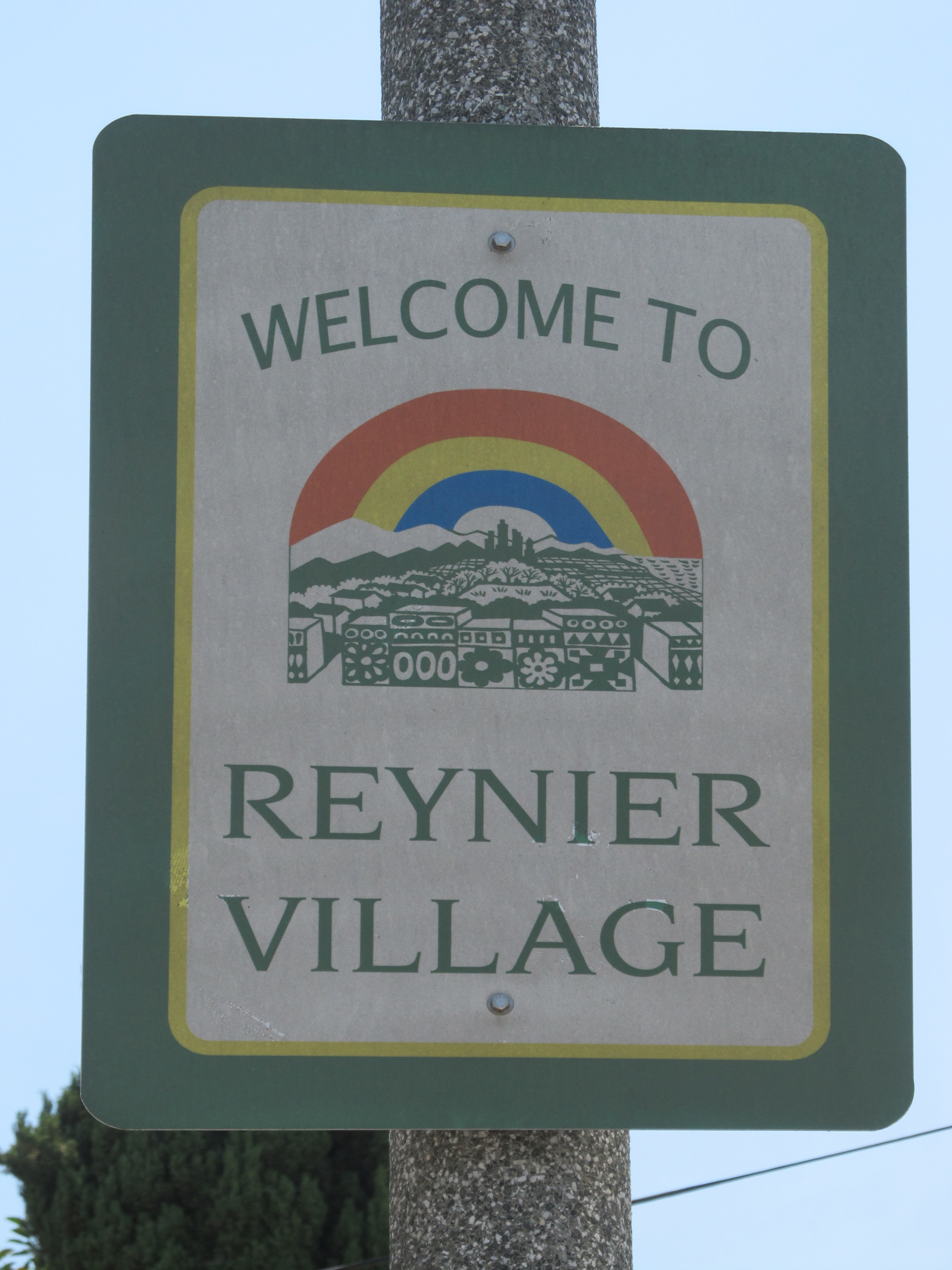
- "Welcome to Reynier Village" sign located at the intersection of Cadillac & Shenandoah.

- Location within Western Los Angeles
- Coordinates: 34.0400406°N 118.3847449°W
- Country: United States
- State: California
- County: Los Angeles
- Time zone: Pacific
- Zip Code: 90034
- Area code: 310

Reynier Village is a neighborhood on the Westside of Los Angeles, California. The Reynier Village neighborhood was known as Reynier Park in the 1920s and 1930s although the actual city park was not established until the late 1970s. For many years, real estate agents had called the area "Beverlywood adjacent" or "south Robertson" (the name of the neighborhood council, which encompasses several neighborhoods including Reynier Village).

== History ==
According to locals, the subdivision was named after a family whose home stood on what it now the city-maintained Reynier Park at 2803 Reynier Avenue.

The residential subdivision was developed about 1921 by a real estate company. The Reynier Park Improvement Association was affiliated with five other neighborhood groups in 1927. In 1929 the association was vocally opposed to an increase in Pacific Electric streetcar fares, especially on the neighboring Venice Short Line. In 1930 the group requested public fire alarm boxes for "that section from National boulevard to Pico boulevard and extending from Venice boulevard to the hills west of Robertson bouleyard in the district of Raynier Park". In 1931 the group was advocating for the channelization of Ballona Creek. In 1934 the newly constructed Benedict Canyon creek storm drain alleviated previously common street flooding "kept the area in Palms and Reynier Park near the Alexander Hamilton high school comparatively dry" and thus Culver City buses were rerouted to Robertson instead of Washington during the rains.

== Geography ==
Reynier Village is a triangular-shaped neighborhood bordered on the north by Cadillac Avenue; on the west by Robertson Boulevard; and on the southeast by Kramerwood Place, the 10 Freeway, and Garth Avenue.

It is bordered by the Los Angeles neighborhoods of La Cienega Heights on the north, Picfair Village and Faircrest Heights on the east and Castle Heights on the west. Culver City on the south.

== Parks and recreation ==
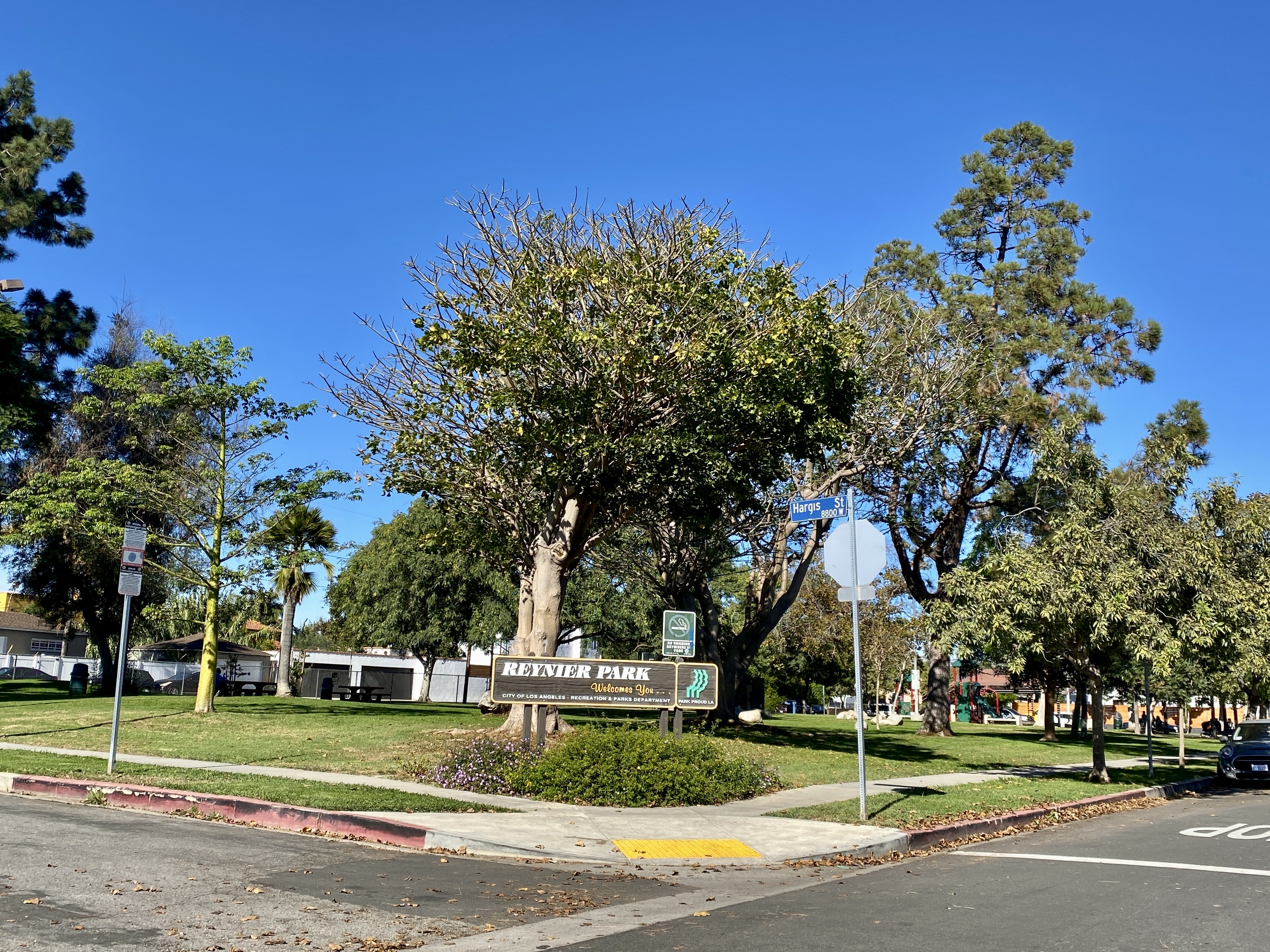
Reynier Park, 2023

- Reynier Park - 2803 Reynier Avenue. Operated by the City of Los Angeles Parks and Recreation Department, it is bounded by Reynier Avenue, Olin, Shenandoah Street, and Hargis. Councilman Zev Yaroslavsky advocated for the creation of the park in 1978.

== Government ==
Reynier Village is in Zone 5 of the South Robertson neighborhood council.

== Education ==
- Shenandoah Street Elementary School - 2450 Shenandoah Street

== Landmarks and attractions ==
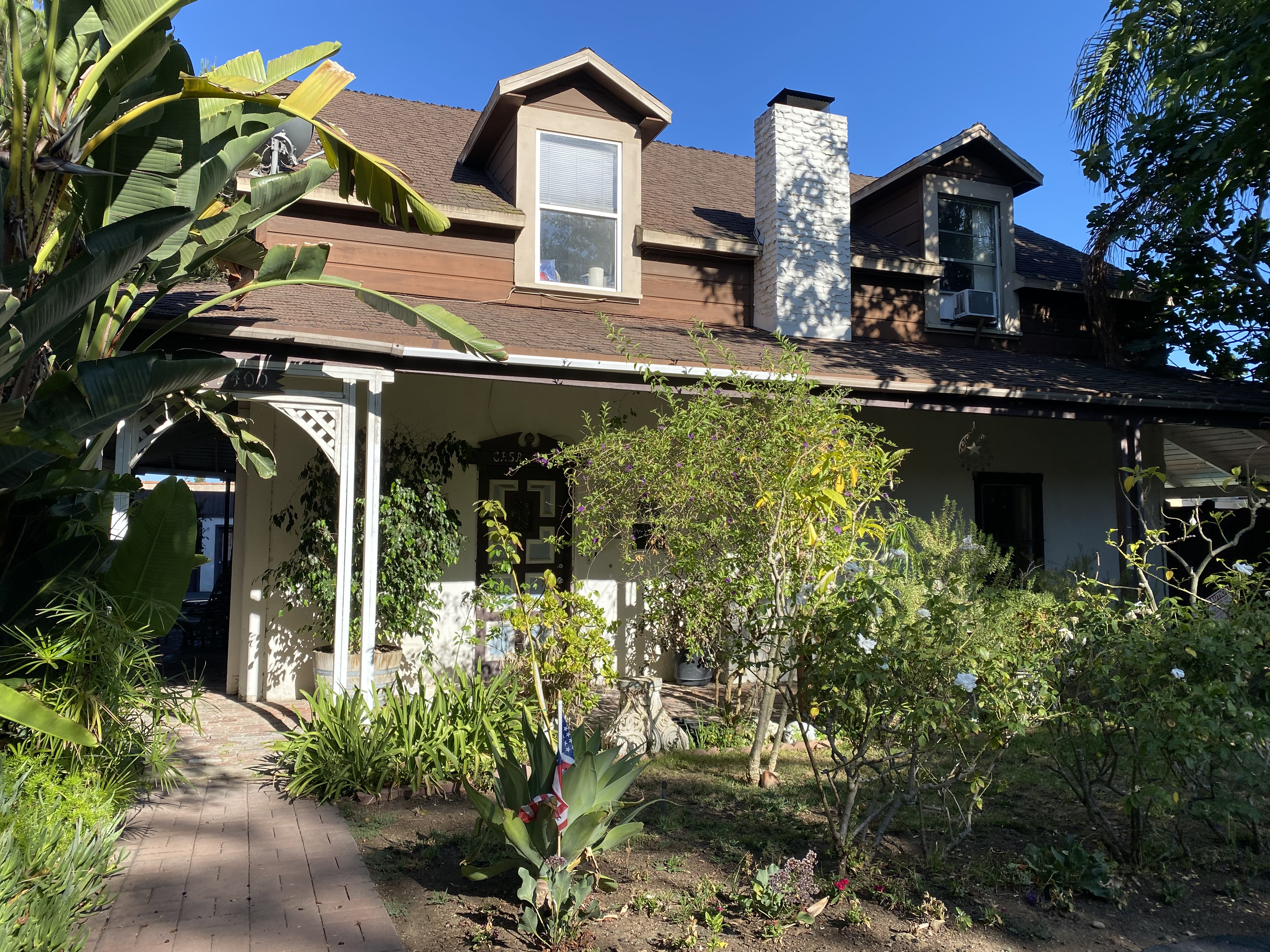
Rocha House, 2022

- Rocha House - 2400 Shenandoah Street. The city's 13th Los Angeles Historic-Cultural Monument

== Notable residents ==
- Harold Harby - 2642 S. Halm Avenue

== In popular culture ==
The White-Boy Shuffle - Reynier Park makes an appearance in Paul Beatty's 2003 Los Angeles novel .
