= Beverlywood, Los Angeles =

Beverlywood
- Neighborhood of Los Angeles
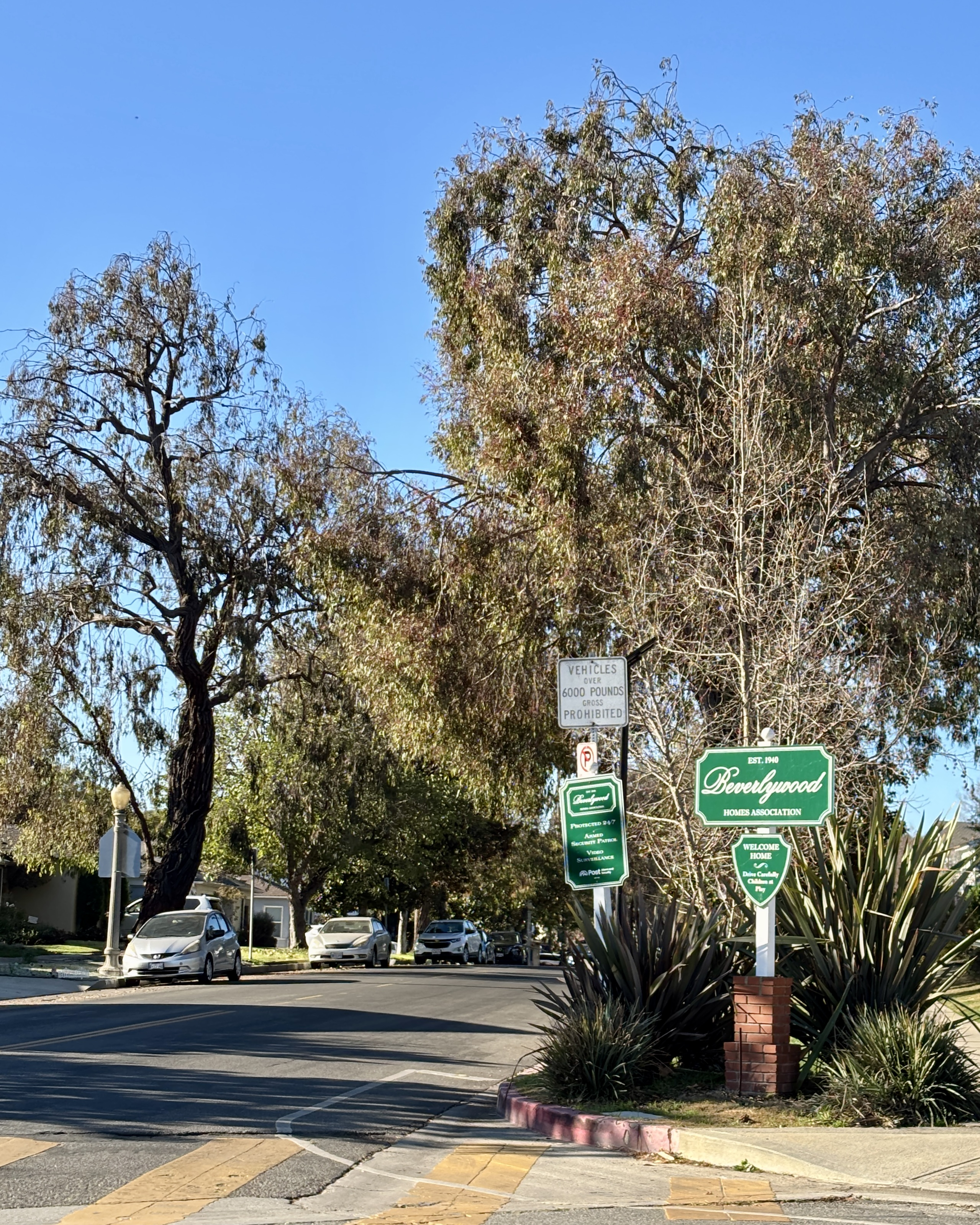

- Location within Westside Los Angeles
- Coordinates: 34.0459334°N 118.3949200°W ,
- Country: United States
- State: California
- County: Los Angeles
- City: Los Angeles
- Time zone: Pacific

Beverlywood is a neighborhood in the Westside of the city of Los Angeles, California.

== History ==
Beverlywood was developed in 1940 by Walter H. Leimert, who also developed Leimert Park. The neighborhood consists of 1,354 single family homes, and was one of the first neighborhoods in the Los Angeles area to have binding CC&Rs. These regulations, which are administered by the Beverlywood Homes Association, strictly limit housing size, style, color, and design along with additional restrictions on landscaping, and are enforced by a review committee. Additionally, all residents are required to pay the fees to the Beverlywood Home Association.

In recent years, the neighborhood has become a hotspot for mansionization. Despite complying with HOA regulations, many residents believe that the newer and larger houses ruin the feel of the neighborhood and have been successfully campaigning the Los Angeles City Council for regulations to restrict new home sizes.

== Geography ==
=== Beverlywood Homes Association ===
According to the Beverlywood Homes Association, the borders of the Beverlywood are: Monte Mar Drive to the north, Robertson Boulevard to the east, Hillcrest Country Club and Anchor Avenue to the west, and Beverlywood Street to the south. These borders are marked by entrance monuments and signs.

Beverlywood is flanked east by Crestview, La Cienega Heights, and Reynier Village; on the south by Castle Heights; and on the west by Cheviot Hills.

=== Los Angeles Times ===
According to the Los Angeles Times, "overzealous real estate agents sometimes stretch the true boundaries of Beverlywood".

The Times reported that the borders of the neighborhood are: Monte Mar Street on the north, Robertson Boulevard on the east, Beverwil and Roxbury Drives on the west, and Beverlywood Street on the south.

The Times also noted that the entrances to the neighborhood are clearly marked with Beverlywood signs.

== Demographics ==
The 2000 U.S. census counted 6,080 residents in the 0.79-square-mile Beverlywood neighborhood—an average of 7,654 people per square mile, about average for the city. In 2008, the city estimated that the population had increased to 6,418. The median age for residents was 39, older than the city at large; the percentages of residents aged 35 to 49 and 65 and older were among the county's highest.

The neighborhood was considered "not especially diverse" ethnically, with a high percentage of white people. The breakdown was whites*, 80%; Asians, 7.3%; Latinos, 6.1%; blacks, 4.2%; and others, 2.4%. *Iran (12.1%) and *Israel (9.3%) were the most common places of birth for the 24.5% of the residents who were born abroad—considered a low figure for Los Angeles.

The median yearly household income in 2008 dollars was $105,253, a high figure for Los Angeles, and the percentage of households earning $125,000 and up was also considered high for the county. The average household size of 2.5 people was average for Los Angeles. Renters occupied 29.7% of the housing stock and house- or apartment owners held 70.3%.

In 2000 there were 113 families headed by single parents, a low rate for the city and the county. The percentages of veterans who served during World War II or the Korean War were among the county's highest.

The neighborhood has been described as an "Orthodox Jewish enclave".

== Government ==
- Beverlywood is inside of California's 37th congressional district and California's 54th State Assembly district.
- Beverlywood is part of the South Robertson Neighborhoods Council.

== Education ==
Fifty-five percent of Beverlywood residents aged 25 and older had earned a four-year degree by 2000, a high figure for both the city and the county. The percentages of residents of that age with a bachelor's degree or a master's degree were also considered high for the county.

The schools within Beverlywood are as follows:

- Canfield Avenue Elementary School, LAUSD, 9233 Airdrome Street
- Castle Heights Elementary School, LAUSD, 9755 Cattaraugus Avenue
- Cheviot Hills Continuation School, LAUSD, 9200 Cattaraugus Avenue

Zoned secondary schools:

- Palms Middle School
- Hamilton High School

== Parks and recreation ==
The Beverlywood Homes Association owns and maintains several private parks in the neighborhood, which, with the exception of Circle Park, are gated and only accessible to Beverlywood residents.

== See also ==
- List of districts and neighborhoods in Los Angeles
