= Mid-City Heights, Los Angeles =

- Neighborhood of Los Angeles
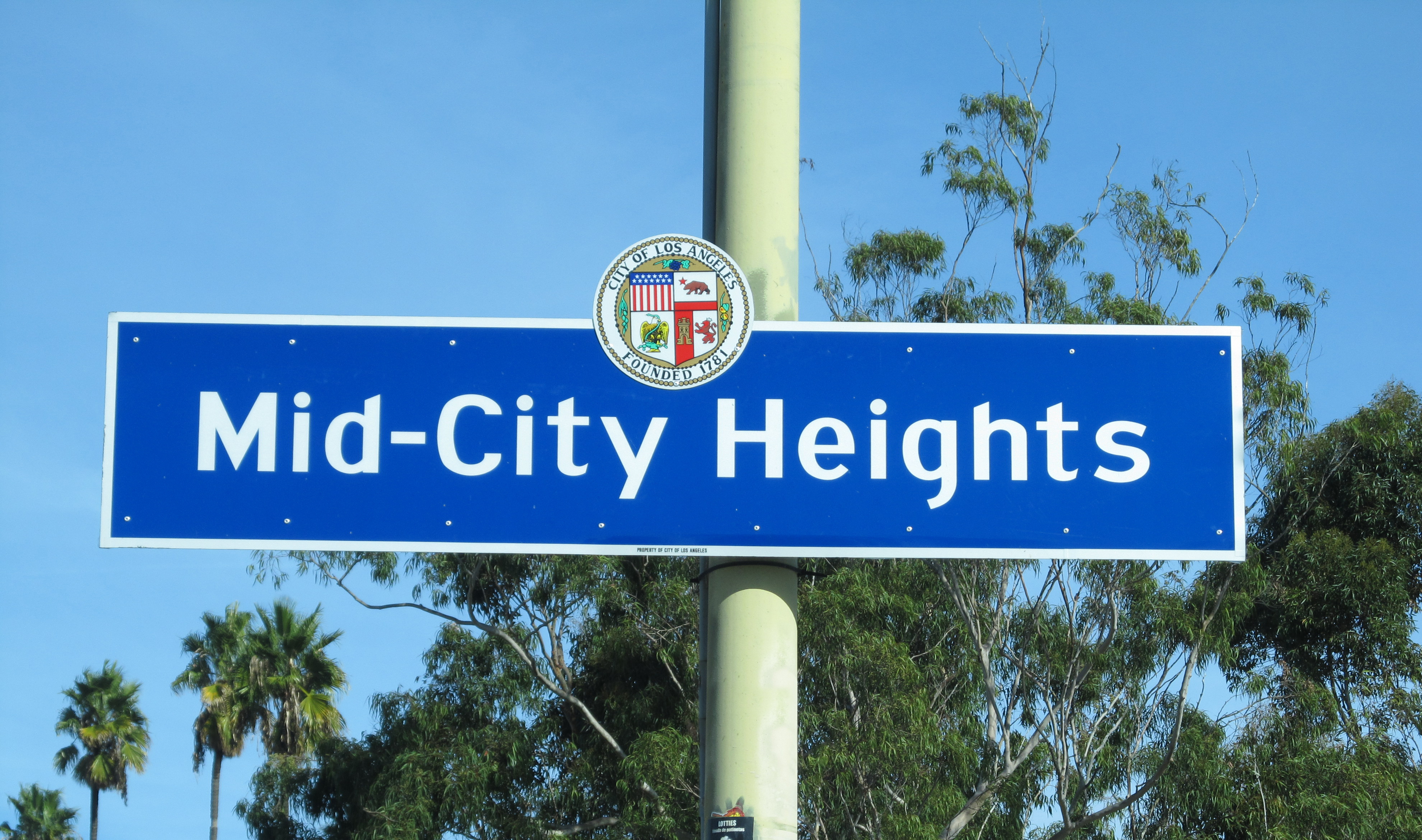
- Mid-City Heights neighborhood sign on West Boulevard as it crosses over the Santa Monica Freeway.

- Location within Central Los Angeles
- Coordinates: 34.036854°N 118.344787°W
- Country: United States
- State: California
- County: Los Angeles
- Time zone: Pacific
- Zip Code: 90016
- Area code: 323

Mid-City Heights is a neighborhood in Los Angeles, California. It lies within the larger Mid-City area of Los Angeles.

== Geography ==
Mid-City Heights is bounded by Washington Boulevard on the north, the Santa Monica Freeway on the south, West Boulevard on the east and Hauser Boulevard on the west.

The City of Los Angeles Department of Transportation has installed neighborhood signage at the following locations: West Boulevard and Washington Boulevard, West Boulevard and the Santa Monica Freeway, La Brea Avenue and Washington Boulevard, La Brea Avenue and the Santa Monica Freeway, and Washington Boulevard and Hauser Street.

The neighborhood lies within the larger area of Mid-City, Los Angeles.

== History ==
Prior to acquiring the name "Mid-City Heights", the area was an unnamed section within Mid-City Los Angeles. A petition to name the area Mid-City Heights began circulating in the community in September 2015. A petition to name a neighborhood must contain 500 signatures from residents and businesses that reside in the community being named. The petition with 540 signatures was submitted to the Los Angeles City Clerk on January 7, 2017.

After the gathered signatures were submitted, the city process of approval began, which included finding out if the area hadn't already been given a name in the distant past. It hadn't. The naming effort went through various City Hall agencies, a City Hall motion, and a Mid-City Neighborhood Council (MINC) vote. On June 30, 2017, the name was approved by the city.

In December 2017, residents formed the Mid-City Heights coalition and, in conjunction with their LAPD senior lead officers, cleaned up a homeless encampment near the Santa Monica Freeway and Highland Avenue.

In 2024, the Los Angeles Times reported that illegal hostels had "popped up" in Mid-City Heights. According to the Department of City Planning, hostels are banned in low-density residential neighborhoods like Mid-City Heights. At that time, the hostels had been cited but some continued to operate.

== Landmarks and attractions ==
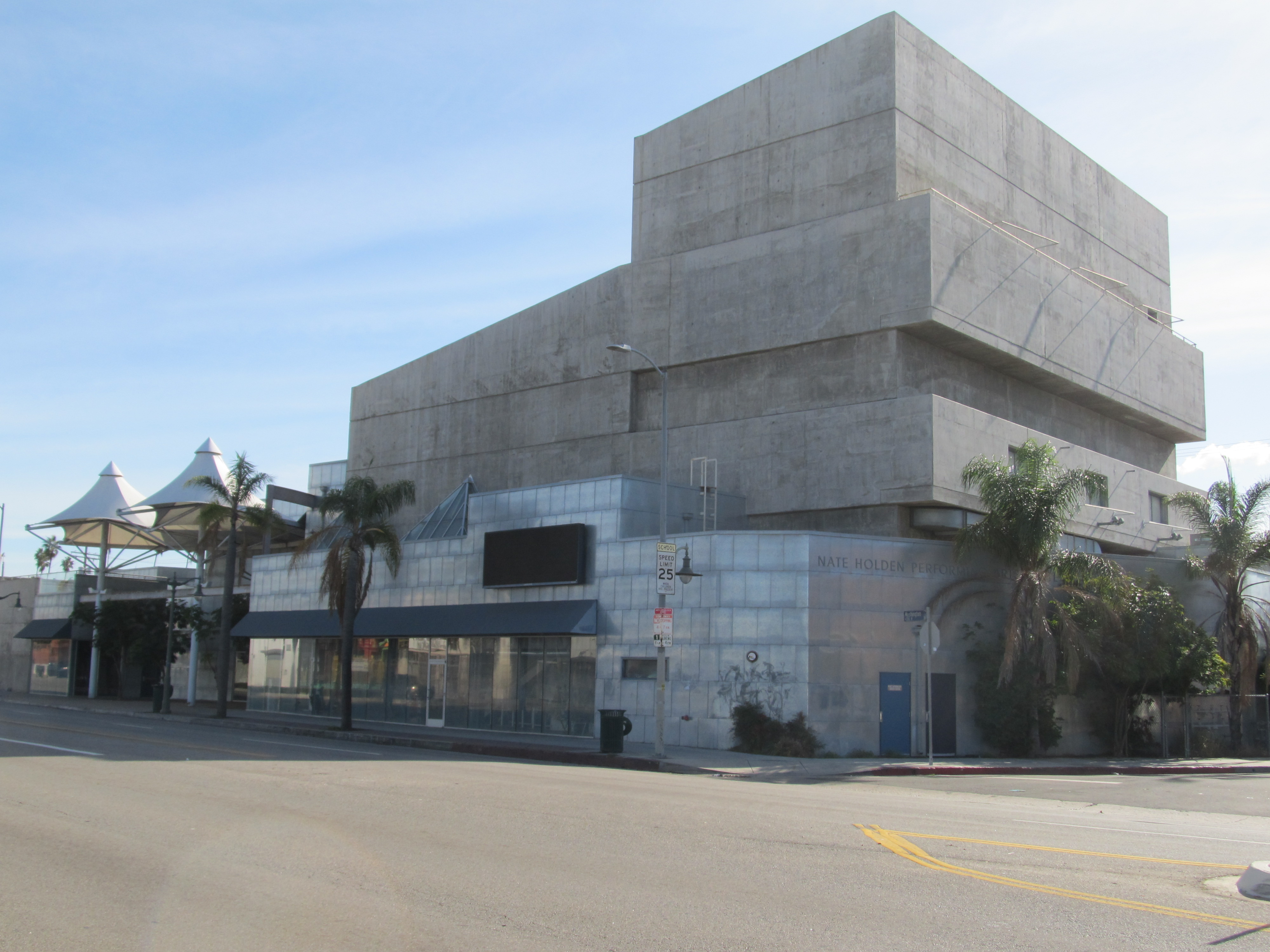
Nate Holden Performing Arts Center on Washington Boulevard.

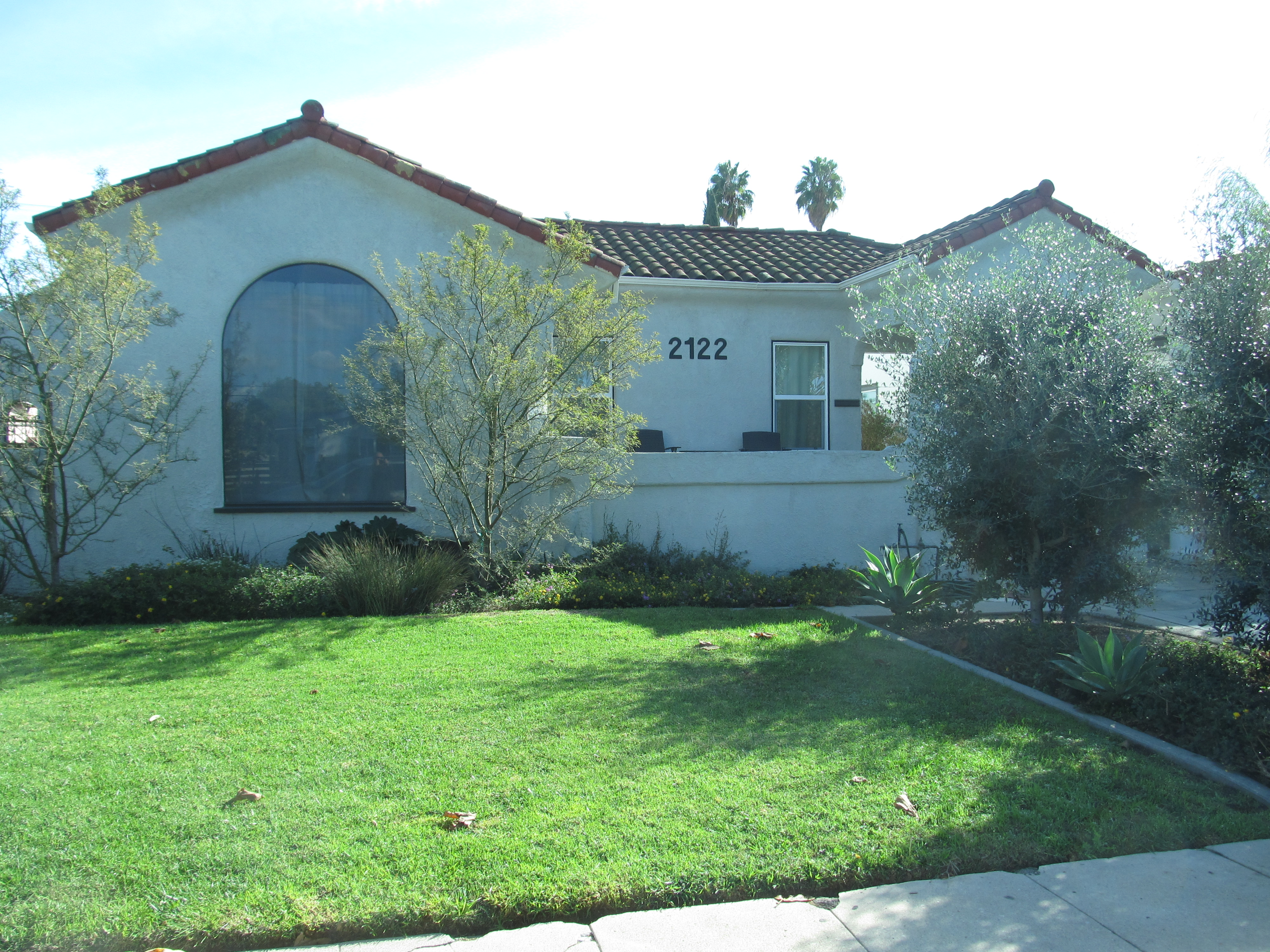
Charles Bukowski's Childhood Home at 2122 South Longwood Avenue.

The following landmarks lie within the boundaries of Mid-City Heights.

- Nate Holden Performing Arts Center – Located at 4718 West Washington Boulevard, the center is the home of the Ebony Repertory Theater Company
- Charles Bukowski's childhood home – 2122 South Longwood Avenue

== Government ==
- United States Post Office, Ray Charles Station - located at 4960 West Washington Boulevard. Renamed in honor of singer Ray Charles in 2005.[18]

== Notable residents ==
- Charles Bukowski, 1931-42 then returned in 1947

== See also ==
- List of districts and neighborhoods in Los Angeles
