= Faircrest Heights, Los Angeles =

Neighborhood of Los Angeles

Faircrest Heights
- Neighborhood
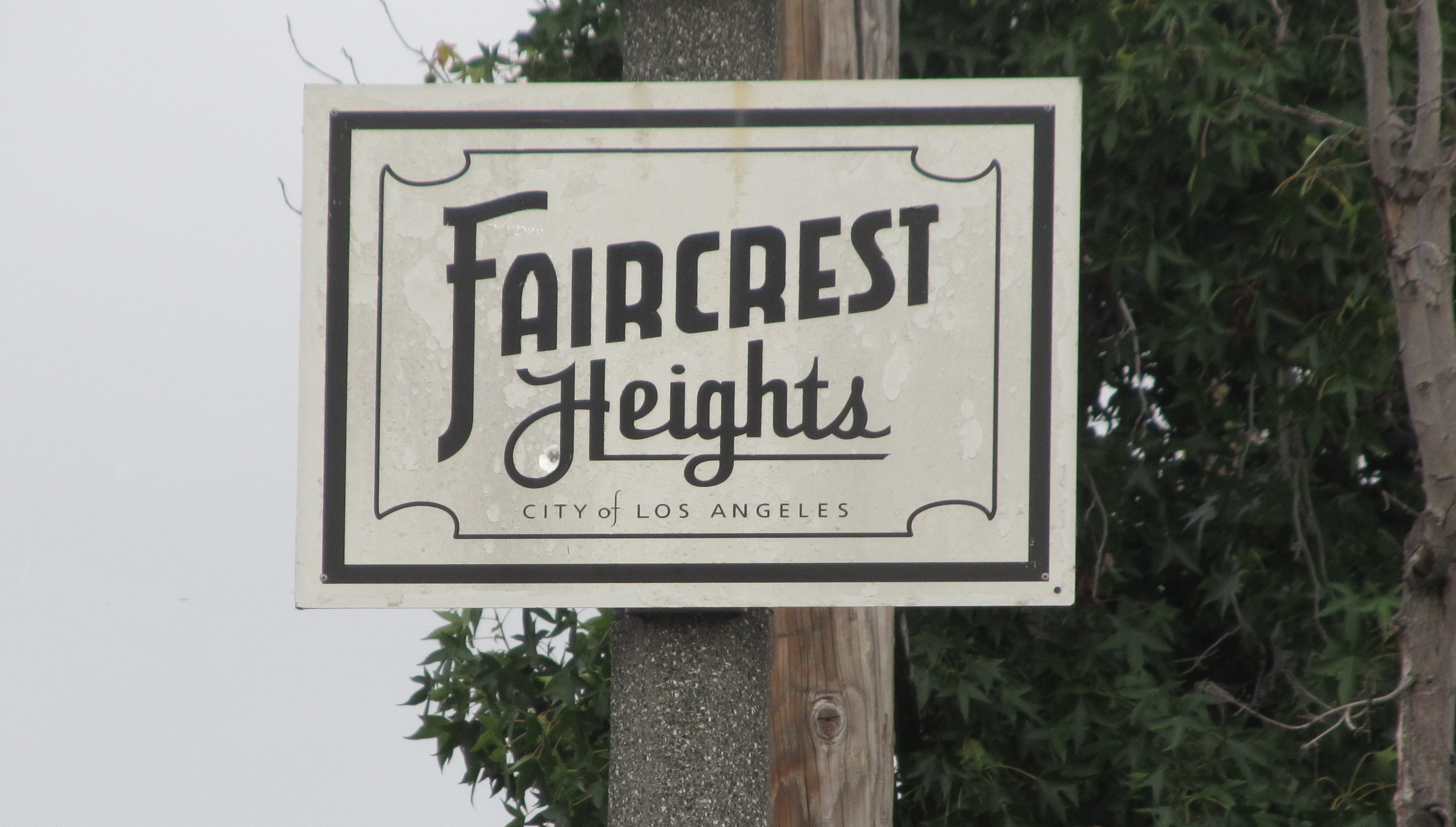
- Faircrest Heights Signage located at the intersection of Fairfax Avenue and Airdrome.

- Location within Los Angeles
- Coordinates: 34°02′46″N 118°22′16″W
- Country: United States of America
- State: California
- County: Los Angeles
- Time zone: Pacific
- Zip Code: 90035, 90016, 90019
- Area code: 323

Faircrest Heights is a neighborhood in Mid-City, Los Angeles, California.

== History ==
Homes in Faircrest Heights were built in the 1920s and 1930s. It was primarily a Jewish neighborhood until the 1960s.

In December 2004, Los Angeles magazine named Faircrest Heights one of the "10 Best Districts You've Never Heard Of".

In 2018, then-mayor Eric Garcetti used Faircrest Heights as the location to unveil a $100 million rebate program from the Department of Water and Power.

== Geography ==
Faircrest Heights is bounded by La Cienega Boulevard on the west, Fairfax Avenue on the east, Pico Boulevard on the north and Guthrie Avenue on the south.

According to Google Maps, Faircrest Heights is bounded by Alvira Street on the west, Fairfax Avenue on the east, Pico Boulevard on the north and Sawyer Street on the south.

Crestview and La Cienega Heights are located to the west; Reynier Village is southwest; Little Ethiopia, and South Carthay are to the north; and Picfair Village is to the east.

== Government ==
Faircrest Heights is served by the P.I.C.O. Neighborhood Council. The map does not indicate a neighborhood called Faircrest Heights. Instead, the council breaks the area into two residential districts: “Neighbors United” and “C.H.A.P.S.” Per the council bylaws, the two combined residential districts are bounded by La Cienega Boulevard on the west; Fairfax Avenue on the east; Pico Boulevard on the north; and David Avenue and Venice Boulevard on the south.

== Demographics ==
Based on the 2010 Census, within the five census block groups that compose Faircrest Heights, racial representation is mixed with approximately 38% white, 37% African American, 8% Asian, and 18% other.

== Education ==
- Los Angeles Center for Enriched Studies - 5931 W. 18th Street

== Notable people ==
- Rita Hayworth
