= Crestview, Los Angeles =

Neighborhood in Los Angeles, California

Crestview is a neighborhood in the Westside of the city of Los Angeles, California.

== Geography ==
Crestview is bounded by Pickford Street on the north, Sawyer Street on the south, Robertson Boulevard on the west, and La Cienega Boulevard on the east.

== Adjacent Neighborhoods ==
Beverlywood is located to the west, Castle Heights is located on the southwest, La Cienega Heights is located to the south, Pico-Robertson is located to the north and Faircrest Heights is located to the east.
