= Rocha House =

Historic building in California, United States

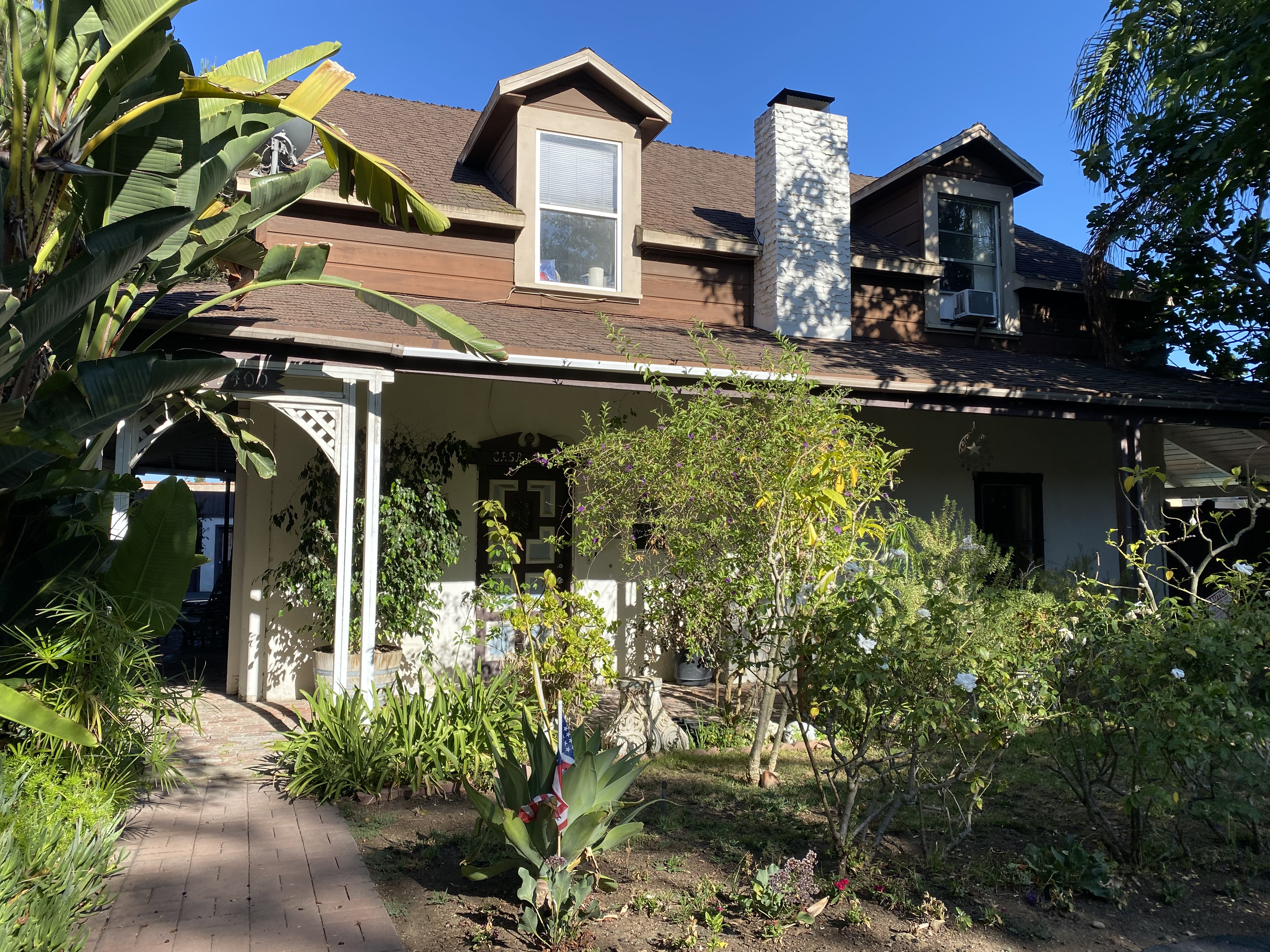
- Rocha House exterior

- Location within Western Los Angeles
- 34°2′22″N 118°23′5″W
- Location: 2400 Shenandoah Street; Los Angeles, California

Los Angeles Historic-Cultural Monument
- Designated: January 28, 1963
- Reference no.: 13

Rocha House is Los Angeles Historic-Cultural Monument No. 13.

== Geography ==
Rocha House is located at 2400 Shenandoah Street, just south of Cadillac Avenue, in the neighborhood of Reynier Village.

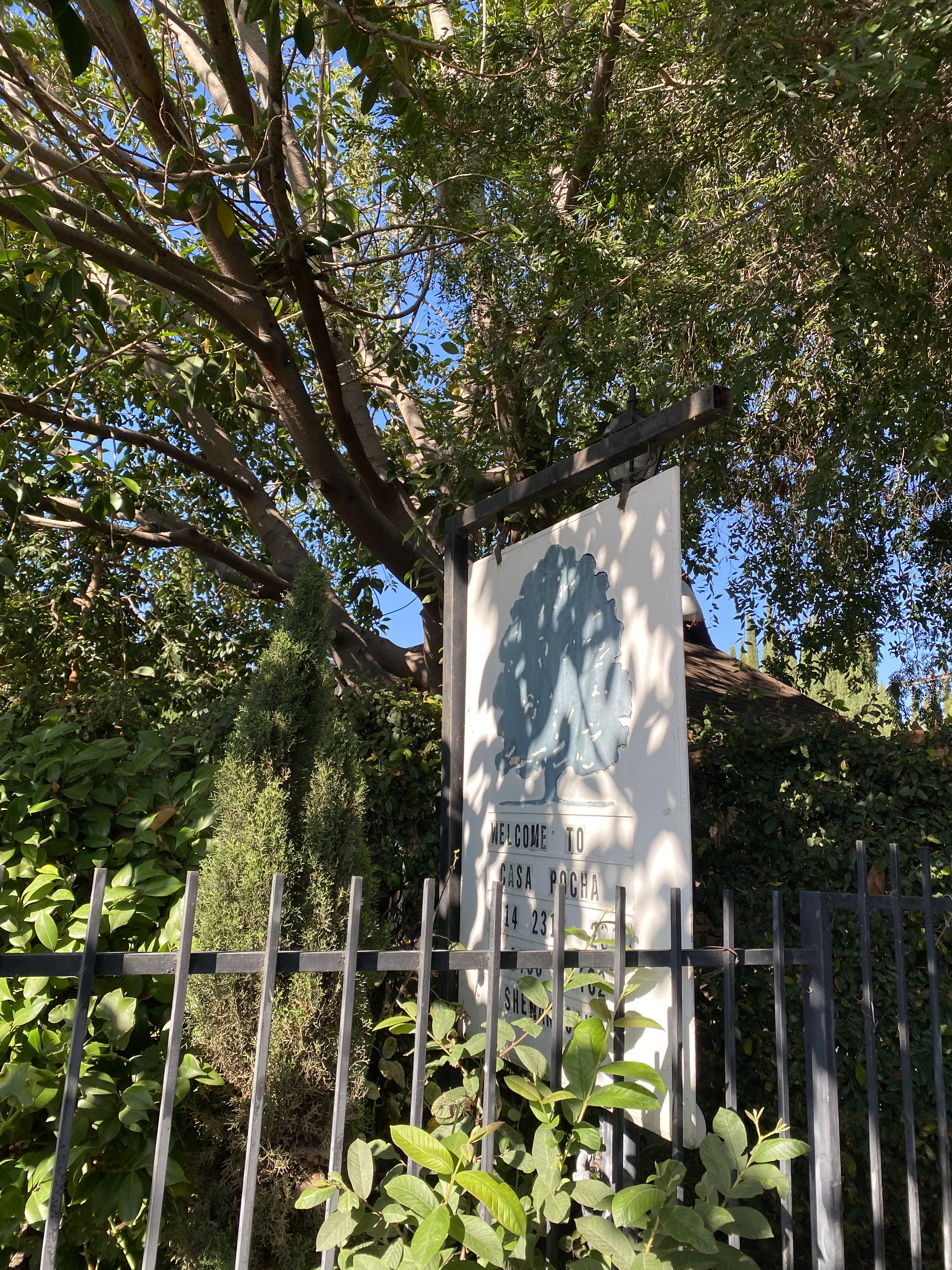
LAHCM 13 Rocha House sign

== History ==
Originally part of Rancho Rincón de Los Bueyes, the land on which the house sits was conveyed to the son of the owner of Rancho La Brea in 1872. The Rocha House was built prior to the transfer, in 1865, by Don Antonio José Rocha II.

The original house has a square “ground plan” and a “gringo stairway”; there have been multiple additions.

Rocha House was designated Los Angeles Historic-Cultural Monument #13 in 1963.

As of 1966, three years after the site was designated a historic-cultural monument, “This quaint landmark, still showing evidence of its romantic past, is the home of a descendant of a descendant of Antonio José Rocha.” It remains a private home.
