= Mansionization =

Urban studies and planning term

Mansionization is an urban planning term associated with the practice of building the largest possible size of home. It can result in demolishing smaller, older houses in neighborhoods and replacing them with brand new ones that occupy the maximum amount of lot space available and are much larger in comparison to the surrounding dwellings, changing the character of neighbourhoods.

Alternatively, it may refer to developments in areas that were formerly open land: in certain areas, building codes have increased the size of lots and therefore commercial pressures lead builders to make the largest possible homes, causing greater ecological damage and resulting in a reduction in affordable housing. The term is well known in Los Angeles, where many property owners have built new homes upward to mimic the skyscrapers-atmosphere that the city presents. The unequal design of these "mansions" to the still-standing homes creates issues of character within neighborhoods, as well as, issues of property value.
