= Robertson Boulevard =

Street in Los Angeles

Coordinates: 34.0259°N 118.3902°W

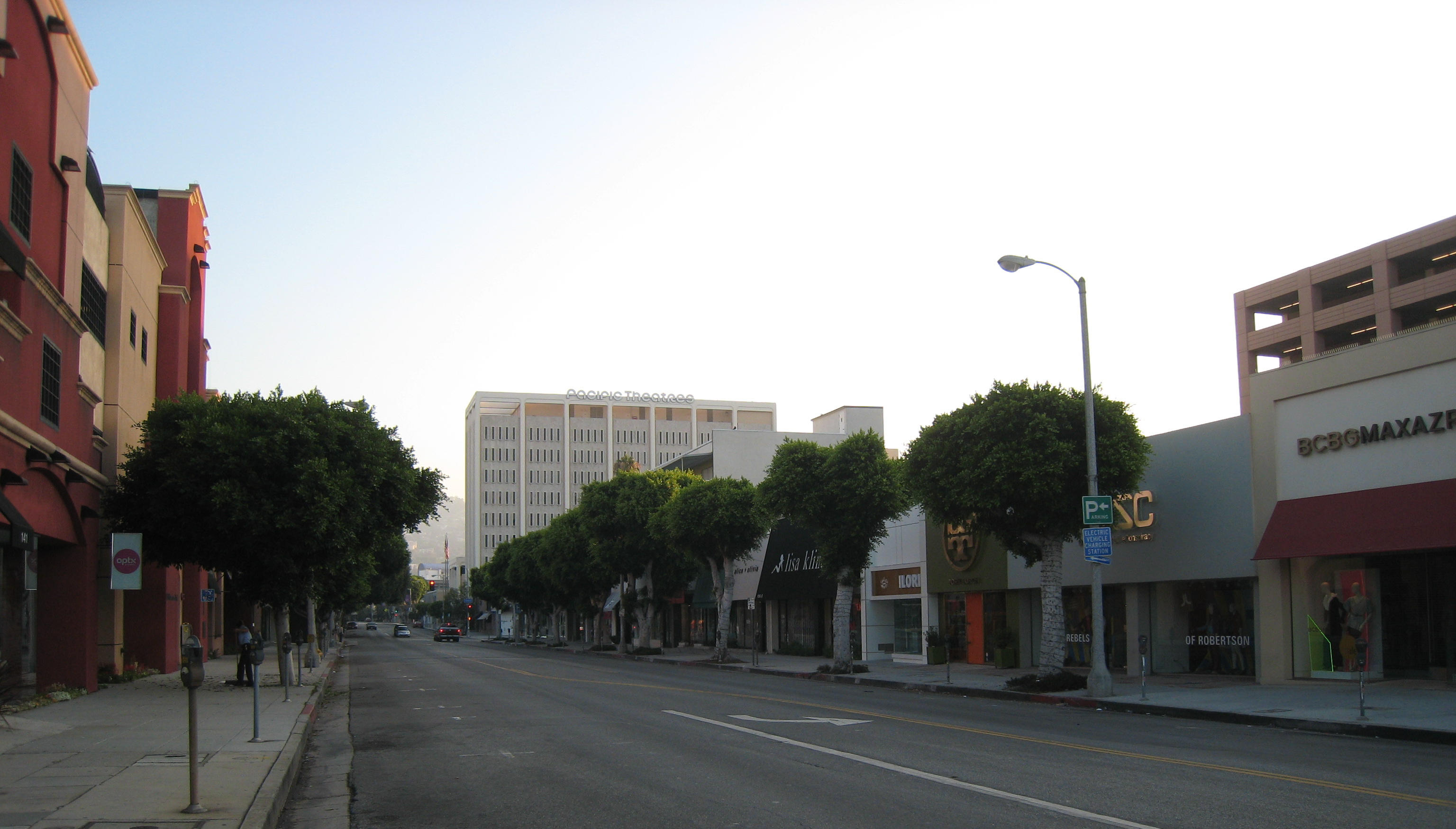
- Robertson Boulevard, looking north, in Los Angeles, California
- Interactive map of Robertson Boulevard
- Location: Los Angeles, West Hollywood, Beverly Hills, and Culver City, California
- Nearest metro station: Culver City
- South end: Washington Boulevard
- Major junctions: I-10 / Santa Monica Freeway; SR 2 / Santa Monica Boulevard
- North end: Keith Avenue

Robertson Boulevard is a street in Los Angeles, in the U.S. state of California, that also passes through the incorporated cities of West Hollywood, Beverly Hills, and Culver City.

== Location ==
Robertson Boulevard is a major north–south thoroughfare on the Westside of Los Angeles running through one of its neighborhoods, Pico-Robertson and between two of its neighborhoods, Beverlywood and Crestview. Its northern end is slightly to the north of Santa Monica Boulevard at Keith Avenue in West Hollywood and its southern end is at Washington Boulevard in Culver City. Robertson Boulevard is accessible via exit #6 on the Santa Monica Freeway (Interstate 10).

== Overview ==
The northern part of the street in West Hollywood and Beverly Hills is a trendy tree-lined shopping district. In West Hollywood, the neighborhood surrounding Robertson Boulevard consists mostly of high-density apartment buildings and condominiums. The residential area surrounding the Robertson Boulevard shopping district in Beverly Hills is more family-oriented and is made up mostly of single-family residences.

Robertson Boulevard was popular with celebrities and paparazzi in the 2000s, partially due to several boutiques and designer clothing and jewelry stores on the street. In addition, several popular eateries are located on Robertson Boulevard. The Kabbalah Centre is also located on the street.

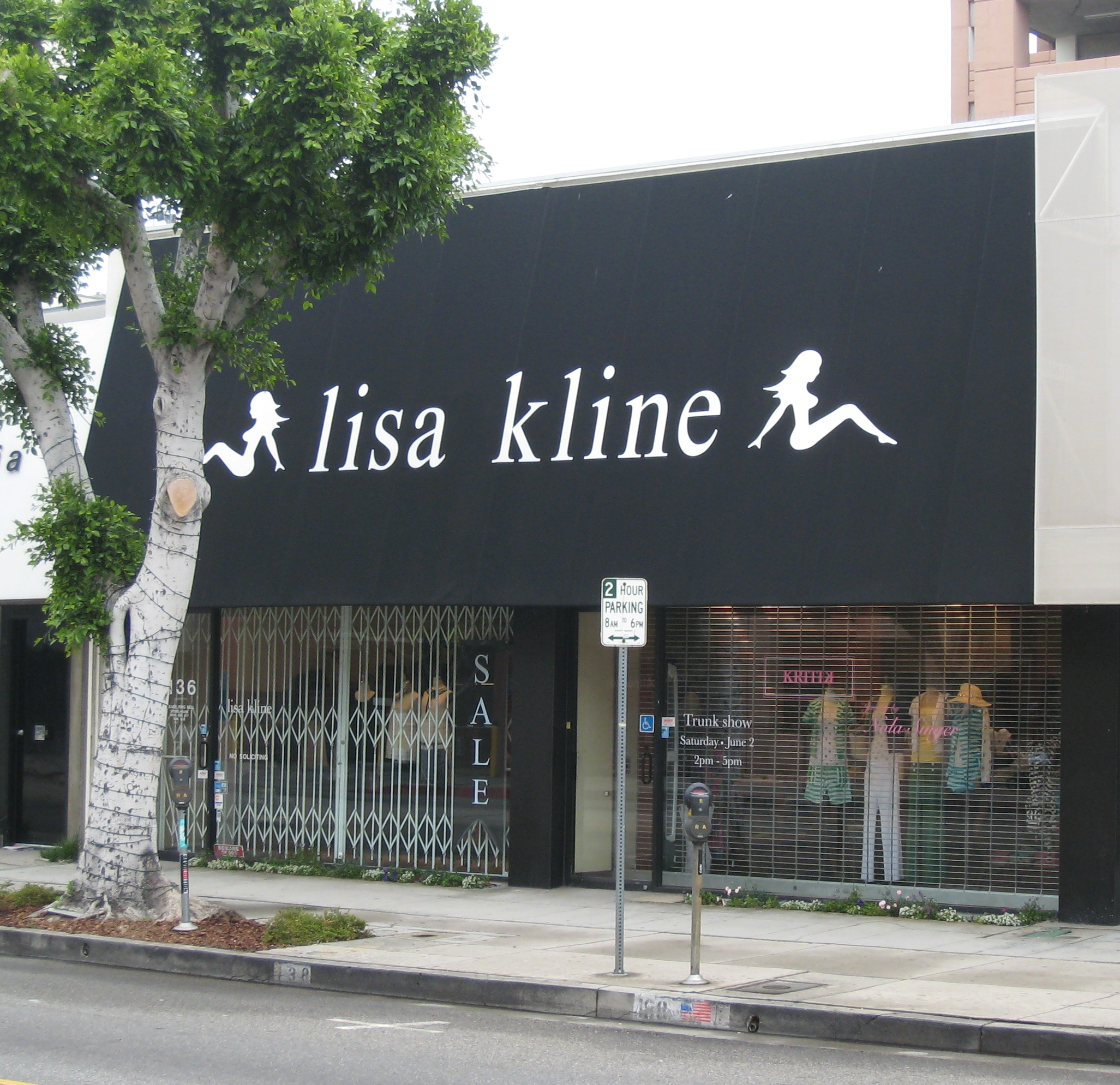
Lisa Kline, one of the many boutique stores on Robertson Boulevard

South of West Hollywood and Beverly Hills and north of Culver City, Pico-Robertson, Beverlywood and Crestview are upper-middle-class neighborhoods in West Los Angeles with a historical and substantial Jewish population. Alexander Hamilton High School, a highly diverse high school in the Beverlywood neighborhood in West Los Angeles is on Robertson Boulevard.

The southern terminus of Robertson Boulevard is Washington Boulevard in Culver City, where it then continues as Higuera Street (which itself later becomes Obama Boulevard).

The Robertson Branch of Los Angeles Public Library is located at 1719 S. Robertson near the intersection of Airdrome.

== Public transportation ==
Metro Local line 617 runs along Robertson Boulevard. The Metro E Line operates a rail station at Venice Boulevard.
