= South Robertson, Los Angeles =

Coordinates: 34.0557°N 118.3798°W

South Robertson
- Neighborhood of Los Angeles
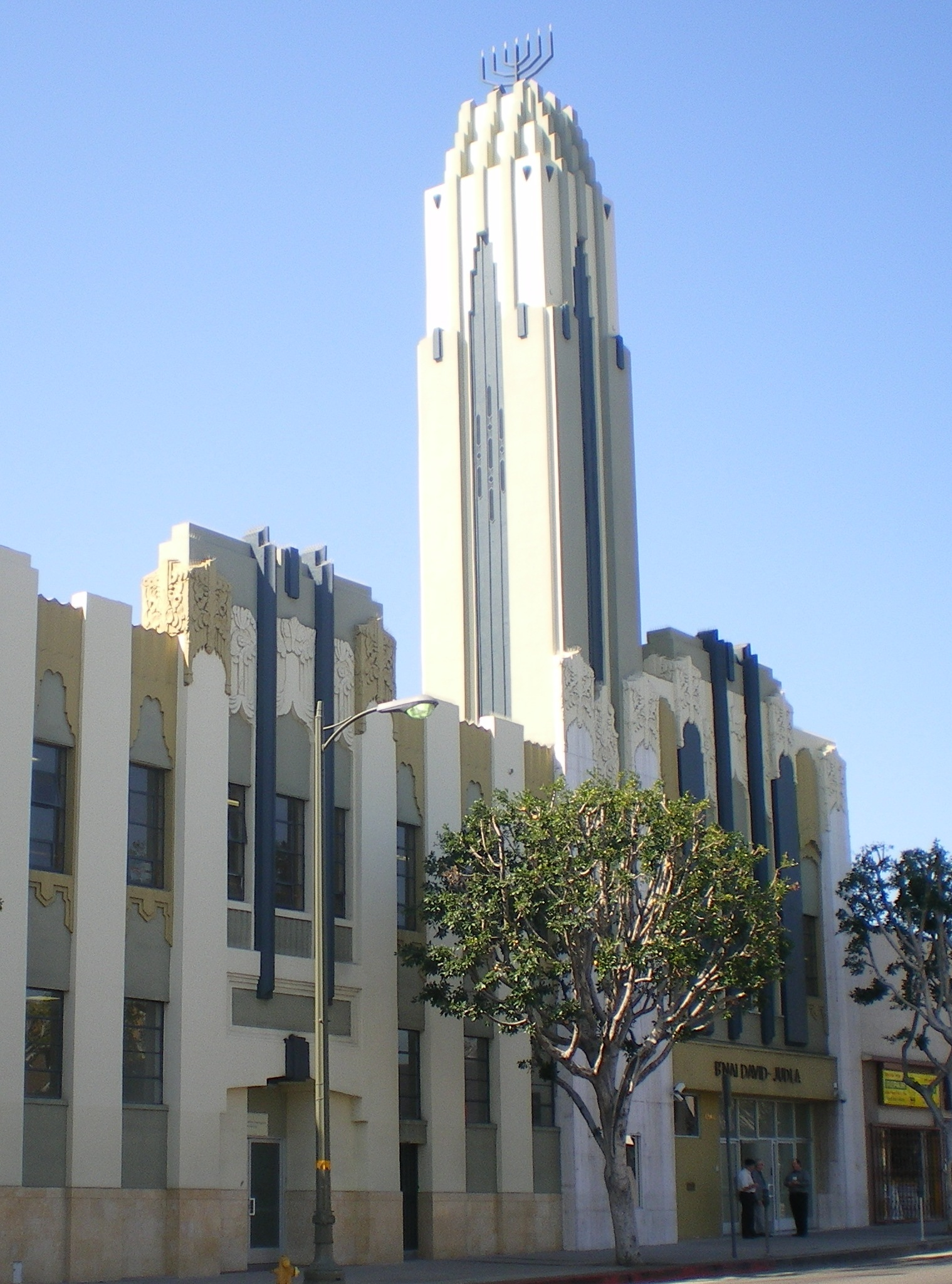
- Bnai David Judea building
- Interactive map of South Robertson
- Country: United States
- State: California
- County: Los Angeles
- City: Los Angeles
- Time zone: UTC-8 (PST)
  - Summer (DST): UTC-7 (PDT)
- ZIP Code: 90035
- Website: South Robertson NC

South Robertson is an area on the Westside of Los Angeles that is served by the South Robertson neighborhood council. It contains the following city neighborhoods: Beverlywood, Castle Heights, Cheviot Hills, Crestview, La Cienega Heights and Reynier Village. The area is notable as a center for the Jewish community.

== Geography ==
=== Boundaries ===
According to the South Robertson Neighborhood Council's map, South Robertson is bounded roughly by the Santa Monica Freeway and Venice Boulevard on the south, La Cienega Boulevard on the east, Gregory Way (to Robertson) on the north, Whitworth (from Robertson to Roxbury) on the north, Roxbury and Beverwil on the west.

The Mapping L.A. project of the Los Angeles Times, identifies a geographically similar area called Pico-Robertson. Its street borders are: north, Gregory Way and Pico Boulevard; northeast, LeDoux Road and Olympic and San Vicente Boulevards, roughly Beverly Glen Drive; east, La Cienega Boulevard; south, Airdrome Street and Hillcrest Country Club; west, Robertson Boulevard, Beverly Green Drive and S. Roxbury Drive.

=== Neighborhoods in the South Robertson Neighborhood Council area ===
The following neighborhoods are within the boundaries established by the neighborhood council: Beverlywood, Castle Heights, Cheviot Hills, Crestview, La Cienega Heights and Reynier Village.

== Population ==
=== 2000 ===
The 2000 U.S. census counted 18,019 residents in the 1.03-square-mile Pico-Robertson neighborhood—an average of 17,468 people per square mile, among the highest population densities for the city. In 2008, the city estimated that the population had increased to 19,253. The median age for residents was 36, older than the city at large; the percentages of residents aged 19 to 34 and 65 and older were among the county's highest.

The neighborhood was considered "not especially diverse" ethnically, with a high percentage of white people. The breakdown was whites, 73.5%; Latinos, 7.3%; Asians, 5.7%; blacks, 5.6%; and others, 7.9%. Iran (37.2%) and Israel (5.7%) were the most common places of birth for the 34.6% of the residents who were born abroad—about the same percentage as in the city at large.

The median yearly household income in 2008 dollars was $63,356, an average figure for Los Angeles. The average household size of 2.1 people was low for Los Angeles. Renters occupied 73.1% of the housing stock and house- or apartment owners held 26.9%.

== Education ==
The following public schools are within the council area:

- Canfield, Crescent Heights, Shenandoah, and Castle Heights elementary schools
- Los Angeles Center for Enriched Studies
- Emerson Middle School
- Hamilton High School

== Jewish community ==
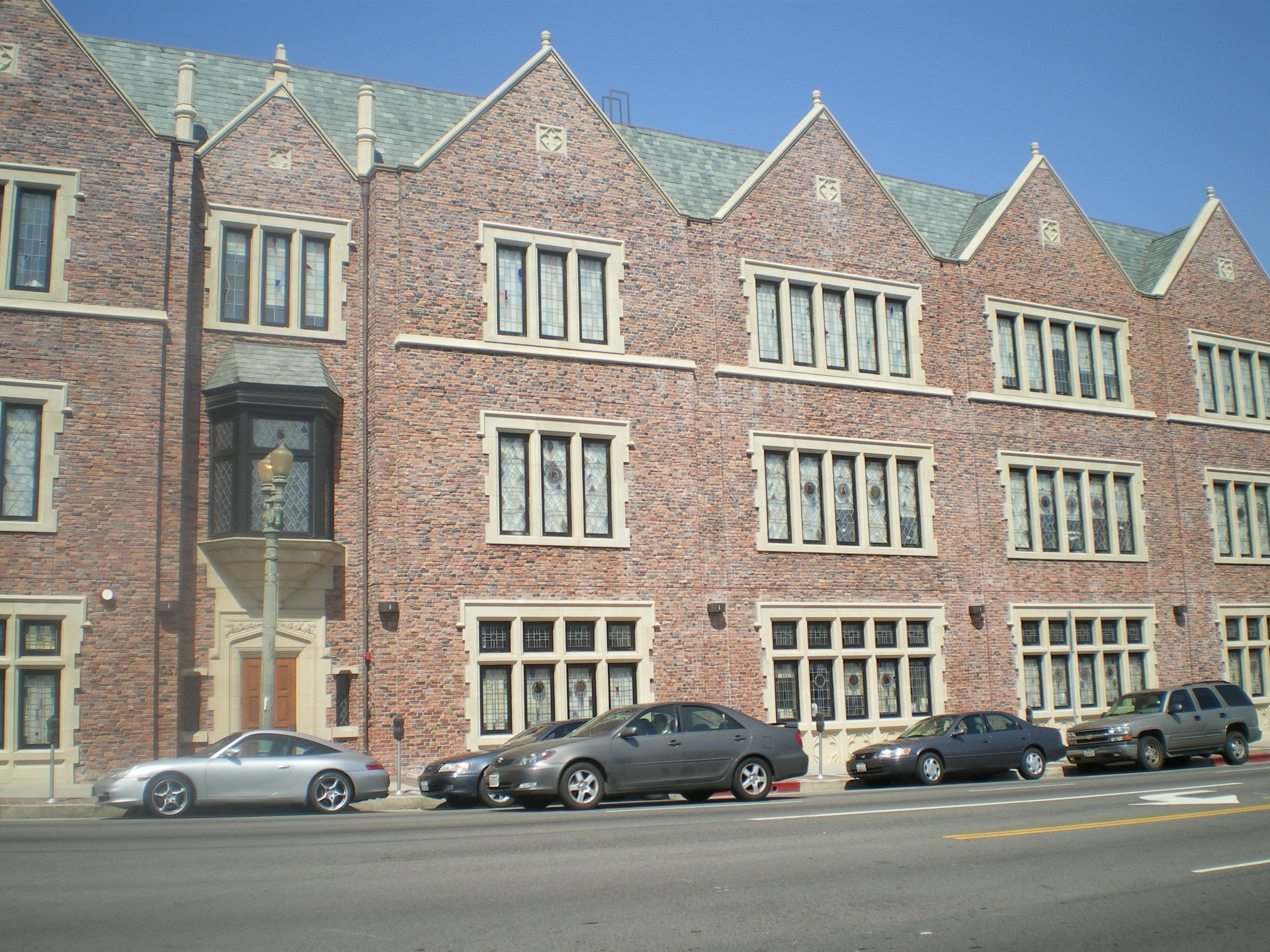
Chabad campus on Pico Blvd. in Pico-Robertson, in a collegiate style reminiscent of the Brooklyn borough of New York City

The neighborhood features more than thirty certified kosher restaurants, including delis, Chinese, Italian and Mexican restaurants, a donut shop, a frozen yogurt shop, bakeries, and butchers. The community features four men's mikvahs and one woman's mikvah, the largest known as the Los Angeles Mikvah.

There are several Jewish day schools located in the Pico-Robertson area. The Chabad community operates four schools, Bais Chaya Mushka and Bais Chana, both of which are on Pico Boulevard, as well as the newly relocated Cheder Menachem on La Cienega. Yeshiva University High School has campuses on both South Robertson Boulevard and West Pico Boulevard.

The community overall has a wide variety of Jewish denominational groups. Over the past two decades, the Orthodox community has grown to become the largest Jewish denomination in the area. This is evident in the growth of the Chabad community.

According to Chabad, the Hasidic movement has eleven centers in the immediate Pico-Robertson area, including the two high schools, boys cheder, day school, six synagogues, and a community center. Minyan Finder reports over twenty synagogues operating in the area.

In 1993, the neighborhood became home to the Los Angeles Museum of Tolerance.

== See also ==
- Neighborhood councils of Los Angeles
