= La Cienega Heights, Los Angeles =

Neighborhood in California, U.S.

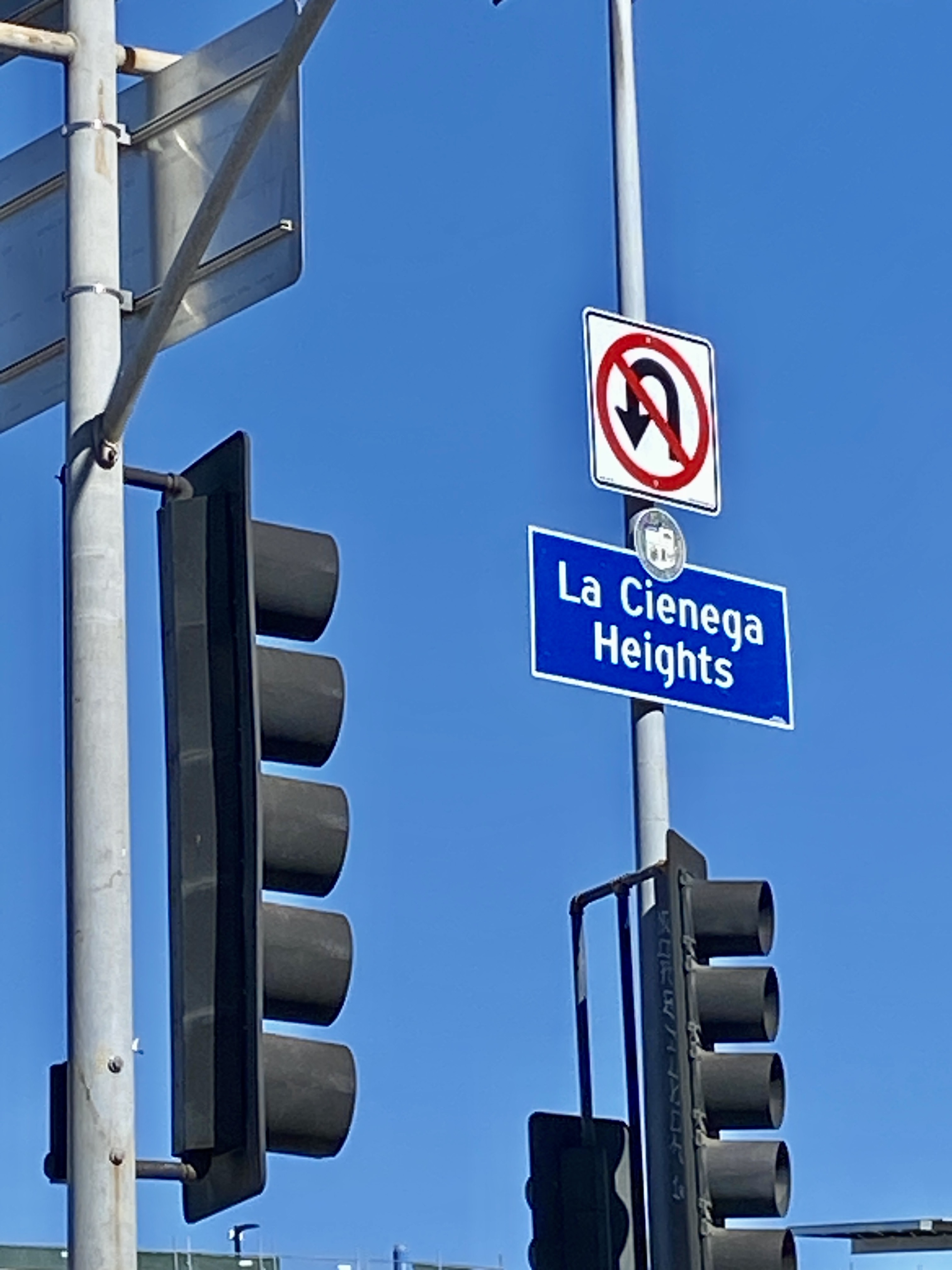
La Cienega Heights neighborhood sign

La Cienega Heights is a neighborhood in the Westside of the city of Los Angeles, California.

La Cienega Heights is bounded by Cadillac Avenue on the south, La Cienega Boulevard on the east, Sawyer Street on the north and Robertson Boulevard on the west. The area was previously known as Cadillac–Corning. The new name has been used since 2003. A legal filing by the La Cienega Heights Association claimed that the neighborhood's "core area" was bounded by "Smiley Drive to the north, Jefferson Boulevard to the south, Carmona Avenue to the east, and La Cienega/Fairfax to the west. The community consists primarily of single-family dwellings and the ethnic makeup is primarily African American and Latino." The neighborhood originally had a substantial Jewish population.

Some accounts describe it as 10 square blocks, others say 18. The South Robertson Neighborhoods Council map has a Corning–La Cienega that is north of the Crestview neighborhood and seemingly distinct from La Cienega Heights.

As of 2012 it was described as having "no discernible landmarks or public spaces except for a shopping center anchored by Ross Dress For Less" and a 2020 profile made the point that it has "no heights to speak of". Per the South Robertson Neighborhoods Council boundaries, Reynier Village is to the south, Faircrest Heights is to the east, Crestview is to the north, and Beverlywood is to the west.

Residents of La Cienega Heights are zoned to attend Hamilton High School.

== In popular culture ==
La Cienega Heights is mentioned in a Paul Beatty novel called The Sellout.
