= Neighborhood councils of Los Angeles =

Local advisory bodies in California, U.S.

The neighborhood councils of Los Angeles are advisory bodies that advocate for their communities on key issues such as development, homelessness, and emergency preparedness, working in collaboration with the Los Angeles city government.

The neighborhood council system was established in 1999 with the aim of ensuring that the city government remains responsive to the diverse needs and lifestyles of Los Angeles’ various communities. Currently, there are ninety-nine neighborhood councils in Los Angeles, each serving approximately 40,000 residents.

== History ==
In 1999, voters approved a new city charter that established the Neighborhood Council System and the Department of Neighborhood Empowerment (EmpowerLA) “to promote more citizen participation in government and make government more responsive to local needs…”. Specifically, the charter ensures each neighborhood council receives early warning of upcoming city decisions and has the opportunity to be heard.

The new charter also required that neighborhood councils be consulted in the budget process. Article IX, Section 909 of the city charter mandates that each council "may present to the Mayor and Council an annual list of priorities for the City budget." The mayor must "inform certified neighborhood councils of the deadline for submission so that the input may be considered in a timely fashion."

While EmpowerLA is the main coordinator for services to neighborhood councils, other city departments also provide support. The Office of the City Attorney has a dedicated Neighborhood Council Advice Division that provides legal guidance to councils and board members. The City Clerk oversees the administration of funding and elections for the Neighborhood Council system.

== Purpose ==
Serving an advisory role, neighborhood councils gather, review, and discuss issues that influence their community and then express their position on these matters through Community Impact Statements (CIS), which are submitted to city decision-makers such as the mayor, city council, and relevant city departments.

== Participation ==
Neighborhood councils allow participation from a wide range of individuals who are involved in the community. This includes individuals who live, work, or own property or businesses within the council's boundaries. In addition, the system includes "community interest stakeholders," who have ongoing and significant involvement within the council's area. Examples of these stakeholders include students of local schools or members of a local church congregation. Board members, candidates, and voters in neighborhood councils do not need to be U.S. citizens or legal residents. Participation is open to individuals who have previously been incarcerated.

== Funding ==
Each neighborhood council receives approximately $25,000 in public funds annually to support their activities (down from $42,000). Board members are required to complete state-mandated training on the ethical management of public funds, which must be allocated by board consensus. These funds can be used for community-based events and programs or to advocate for various issues, such as crime prevention, infrastructure improvement, support for children, homelessness assistance, arts, or local economic development.

== List of neighborhood councils ==
The current ninety-nine neighborhood councils are:

Neighborhood council	Meeting day	Meeting location
Arleta	3rd Tuesday	Osborne Neighborhood Church; 13501 Osborne Street; Arleta, CA 91331-5306
Arroyo Seco	4th Monday	Ramona Hall; 4580 North Figueroa St. Los Angeles, CA 90065
Arts District Little Tokyo	2nd Tuesday	Little Tokyo Branch; 203 S. Los Angeles St. Los Angeles, CA 90012
Atwater Village	2nd Thursday	Atwater Village Branch Library 3379 Glendale Blvd. Los Angeles, CA 90039
Bel Air-Beverly Crest	4th Wednesday	TreePeople Conference Center at Coldwater Canyon Park; 12601 Mulholland Drive; Los Angeles, CA 90077
Boyle Heights	4th Wednesday	Boyle Heights City Hall Community Room; 2130 East First Street; Los Angeles, CA 90033
CANNDU	2nd and 4th Monday	Personal Involvement Center; 8220 San Pedro St. Los Angeles, CA 90003
Canoga Park	4th Wednesday	Canoga Park Community Center; 7248 Owensmouth Ave. Canoga Park, CA 91303
Central Alameda	3rd Saturday	Slauson Multipurpose Center; 5306 Compton Ave; Los Angeles, CA 90011
Central Hollywood	4th Monday	Hollywood Neighborhood City Hall; 6501 Fountain Ave. Hollywood, CA 90028
Central San Pedro	3rd Tuesday	Port of Los Angeles High School; 250 W. 5th Street; San Pedro, CA 90731
Chatsworth	1st Wednesday	Lawrence Middle School; 10100 Variel Ave. Chatsworth, CA 91311
Coastal San Pedro	3rd Monday	Los Angeles Yacht Club; 285 Whalers Walk; San Pedro, CA 90731
Del Rey	2nd Thursday	Del Rey Square; 11976 Culver Boulevard; Del Rey, CA 90066
Downtown Los Angeles	2nd Tuesday	East City Hall, Controller’s Conference Room 351; 200 N. Main Street; Los Angeles, CA 90012
Eagle Rock	1st Tuesday	Eagle Rock City Hall; 2035 Colorado Blvd. Los Angeles, CA 90041
East Hollywood	3rd Monday	Hollywood Hotel; 1160 N Vermont Ave; Los Angeles, CA 90029
Echo Park	4th Tuesday	N/A
Elysian Valley Riverside	2nd Wednesday	Allesandro Elementary School, Staff Lounge; 2210 Riverside Dr. Los Angeles, CA 90039
Empowerment Congress Central	4th Monday	The Connect; 6111 S Gramercy Pl #4; Los Angeles, CA 90047
Empowerment Congress North	1st Thursday	N/A
Empowerment Congress Southeast	4th Tuesday	Mark Ridley-Thomas Constituent Service Center; 8475 S. Vermont Ave. Los Angeles, CA 90044
Empowerment Congress Southwest	3rd Monday	Mark Ridley-Thomas Constituent Service Center; 8475 S. Vermont Ave. Los Angeles, CA 90044
Empowerment Congress West	Community Town Hall Meeting; 1st Saturday; Board Meeting; 3rd Monday	Baldwin Hills Crenshaw Plaza Community Room (near Sears); 3650 W Martin Luther King Jr. Blvd. Los Angeles, CA 90008
Encino	4th Wednesday	Encino Community Center; 4935 Balboa Blvd. Encino, CA 91316
Foothills Trails District	3rd Thursday	Lake View Terrace Recreation Center; 11075 Foothill Blvd. Lake View Terrace, CA 91342
Glassell Park	3rd Tuesday	Glassell Park Community Center; 3750 Verdugo Rd. Los Angeles, CA 90065
Granada Hills North	1st Tuesday	Saint Euphrasia Parish Hall; 11766 Shoshone Ave. Granada Hills, CA 91344
Granada Hills South	1st Thursday	Granada Hills Charter High School; Rawley Hall; 10535 Zelzah Ave. Granada Hills, CA 91344
Greater Cypress Park	2nd Tuesday	Cypress Park Recreation Center; 2630 Pepper Ave. Los Angeles, CA 90065
Greater Toluca Lake	3rd Tuesday	Toluca Lake Elementary School Auditorium; 4840 Cahuenga Blvd. North Hollywood, CA 91601
Greater Valley Glen	1st Monday	Valley College Cafeteria; Conference Room; 5800 Fulton Ave. Valley Glen, CA 91401
Greater Wilshire	2nd Wednesday	Wilshire Ebell Theatre; 743 S. Lucerne Blvd. Los Angeles, CA 90005
Harbor City	3rd Wednesday	Harbor City/Harbor Gateway Library; 24000 Western Ave. Harbor City, CA 90710
Harbor Gateway North	2nd Tuesday; 4th Tuesday every 3rd month (January, April, July, and October)	Virtual via Zoom
Harbor Gateway South	2nd Thursday	Halldale Avenue School Auditorium; 21514 Halldale Ave. Torrance, CA 90501
Hermon	2nd Thursday of every odd-numbered month	The Hermon Fellowship Center; 5800 Monterey Road; Los Angeles, CA 90042
Historic Cultural North	4th Monday	Chinatown Branch Library, Meeting Room; 639 N Hill St, Los Angeles, CA 90012
Historic Highland Park	1st Thursday	Highland Park Senior Center; 6152 N. Figueroa St. Los Angeles, CA 90042
Hollywood Hills West	3rd Wednesday	Will and Ariel Durant Branch Library; 7140 Sunset Blvd. Los Angeles, CA 90046
Hollywood Studio District	2nd Monday	5500 Hollywood Blvd; Lemon Grove Recreation Center; 4959 Lemon Grove Ave. Los Angeles, CA 90028
Hollywood United	2nd Monday	Fire Station 82 Annex; Second Floor; 1800 N. Bronson Ave. Los Angeles, CA, 90028
LA-32	1st Wednesday	El Sereno Senior Center; 4818 Klamath Place; Los Angeles, CA 90032
Lake Balboa	1st Wednesday	Gault Street Elementary School; 17000 Gault Street; Lake Balboa, CA 91406
Lincoln Heights	1st and 3rd Thursday	Lincoln Heights Recreation Center; 2303 Workman St. Los Angeles, CA 90031
Los Feliz	3rd Tuesday	Elysian Masonic Lodge; 1900 N. Vermont Avenue; Los Angeles, CA, 90027
MacArthur Park	1st Monday	MacArthur Park Recreation Center; 2230 W. 6th Street; Los Angeles, CA 90057
Mar Vista	3rd Tuesday	Mar Vista Recreation Center Auditorium; 11430 Woodbine St. Mar Vista, CA 90066
Mid City	2nd Monday	LAPD Wilshire Division; Community Room; 4849 Venice Blvd. Los Angeles, CA 90019-5664
Mid-City West	2nd Tuesday	Pan Pacific Park Senior Center (lunch room); 141 S Gardner St; Los Angeles, CA 90036
Mission Hills	1st Monday	Mission Community Police Station; Falco Room; 11121 Sepulveda Blvd. Mission Hills, CA 91345
NoHo	2nd Monday	North Hollywood Senior Center; 5301 Tujunga Ave. North Hollywood, CA 91601 (North side of NoHo Park)
North Hills East	2nd Monday	Carl’s Jr. 9505 Sepulvenda Blvd; North Hills, CA 91343
North Hills West	3rd Thursday	New Horizon Center; 15725 Parthenia Street; North Hills, CA 91343
North Hollywood Northeast	3rd Wednesday	LA Fire Station 89; 7063 Laurel Canyon; North Hollywood, CA 91605
North Hollywood West	2nd Wednesday	Valley Plaza Library; 12311 Vanowen St; North Hollywood, CA 91605
North Westwood	1st Wednesday	UCLA Weyburn Commons Village View Room; 4th Floor; 11020 Weyburn Dr. Los Angeles, CA 90024
Northridge East	3rd Wednesday	Northridge Woman’s Club; 18401 Lassen Street; Northridge, CA 91325
Northridge South	4th Thursday (except Nov and Dec meetings)	Northridge Middle School; 17960 Chase Street; Northridge, CA 91325
Northridge West	2nd Tuesday	Northridge Christian Church; 18901 Chatsworth St. Northridge, CA 91326
Northwest San Pedro	2nd Monday	Peck Park Auditorium; 560 N. Western Ave. San Pedro, CA 90732
Olympic Park	1st Monday	Los Angeles High School; 4650 W Olympic Blvd. Los Angeles, CA 90019
Pacoima	3rd Wednesday	Pacoima Community Center, Multipurpose Room; 11243 Glenoaks Blvd. Pacoima, CA 91331
Palms	1st Wednesday	Iman Cultural Center; 3376 Motor Ave. Palms, CA 90034
Panorama City	4th Thursday (3rd in Nov & Dec)	Plaza Del Valle Community Building G Unit #62; 8610 Van Nuys Blvd. Panorama City, CA 91402
Park Mesa Heights	2nd Saturday	YES Academy; 3140 Hyde Park Blvd. Los Angeles, CA 90043
P.I.C.O.	2nd Wednesday	Claude Pepper Senior Citizen Center; 1762 S. La Cienega Blvd. Los Angeles, CA 90035
Pico Union	1st Monday	Olympic Community Police Station; 1130 South Vermont Avenue; Los Angeles, CA 900106
Porter Ranch	2nd Wednesday	Castlebay Lane Charter School; 19010 Castlebay Lane; Porter Ranch, CA 91326
Rampart Village	3rd Tuesday	St. Anne’s; 155 N. Occidental Blvd. #236; Los Angeles, CA 90026
Reseda	3rd Monday	Reseda Neighborhood Council Community Space; 18118 Sherman Way; Reseda, CA 91335
Sherman Oaks	2nd Monday	Millikan Middle School, Burrill Hall; 5041 Sunnyslope Avenue; Sherman Oaks, CA 91423
Silverlake	1st Wednesday	Micheltorena Elementary School; 1511 Micheltorena St; Los Angeles, CA 90026
South Central	3rd Tuesday	All People Community Center; 822 E. 20th St. Los Angeles, CA 90011
South Robertson	3rd Thursday	Simon Wiesenthal Center; 1399 S. Roxbury Dr. Los Angeles, CA 90035
Studio City	4th Wednesday	BLDG. 8 MPR-3; 4024 Radford Ave. Studio City, CA 91604
Sun Valley Area	2nd Tuesday	Sun Valley Branch Library; 7935 Vineland Ave; Sun Valley, CA 91352
Sunland-Tujunga	2nd Wednesday	Apperson Street School; 10233 Woodward Ave. Sunland, CA 91040
Sylmar	4th Thursday	Discover Charter Prep School; 13570 Eldridge Ave. Sylmar, CA 91342 Osceola Street Elementary School; 14940 Osceola St. Sylmar, CA 91342
Tarzana	4th Tuesday	Tarzana Childcare Center; 5700 Beckford Ave. Tarzana, CA 91356
United Neighborhoods	1st Thursday	Council District 10 Field Office; 1819 S. Western Ave. Los Angeles, CA 90006
Valley Village	4th Wednesday	Faith Presbyterian Church; Social Hall; 5000 Colfax Avenue; Valley Village, CA 91607
Van Nuys	2nd Wednesday	Marvin Braude Constituent Center; 6262 Van Nuys Blvd. Van Nuys, CA 91401
Venice	3rd Tuesday	Westminster Elementary Auditorium; 1010 Abbott Kinney Blvd. Venice, CA 90291
Voices	2nd Tuesday	Vermont Square Library; 1201 W 48th St. Los Angeles, CA 90037
Watts	2nd Tuesday	Watts Labor Community Action Committee (WLCAC); 10950 S. Central Ave; Los Angeles, 90059
West Adams Neighborhood Council	3rd Monday	Vineyard Recreation Center; 2942 Vineyard Avenue; Los Angeles, CA 90016
West Hills	1st Thursday	de Toledo High School; 22622 Vanowen Street; West Hills, CA 91307
West Los Angeles	4th Wednesday	Stoner Park Gymnasium; 1835 Stoner Ave. Los Angeles, CA 90025
Westchester/Playa	1st Tuesday	Westchester Municipal Building; Council Community Room; 7166 W. Manchester Ave. Westchester, CA 90045
Westlake North	2nd Thursday	Rampart Community Police Station; 1401 W 6th Street (Community Room); Los Angeles, CA 90017
Westlake South	4th Monday	Rampart Community Police Station; 1401 W 6th Street (Community Room); Los Angeles, CA 90017
Westside	2nd Thursday	Westside Pavilion; 10800 W. Pico Blvd. Community Meeting Room B Los Angeles, CA 90064
Westwood	2nd Wednesday	Belmont Village; 10475 Wilshire Blvd. 1st floor Community Room/ Town Hall; Los Angeles, CA 90024
Wilmington	4th Tuesday	Phineas Banning High School; 1527 Lakme Ave. Wilmington, CA 90744
Wilshire Center-Koreatown	2nd Monday	Pio Pico Library; 694 S. Oxford Ave; Los Angeles, CA 90005
Winnetka	2nd Tuesday	Winnetka Convention Center (Next to Canoga Bowl); 20122 Vanowen Street; Winnetka, CA 91306
Woodland Hills-Warner Center	2nd Wednesday	Fire Station 84, Community Room; 21050 Burbank Blvd. Woodland Hills, CA 91367
Zapata-King	3rd Wednesday	Council District 9 District Office, Community Room; 4301 S. Central Ave; Los Angeles, CA 90011

== Notable neighborhood councilmembers ==
This is a list of notable individuals who have served on a neighborhood council in Los Angeles.

- Ron Galperin, 19th Los Angeles City Controller
- Maebe A. Girl, first drag queen elected to public office in the United States (Silver Lake)
- Alex Gruenenfelder, filmmaker and author (Echo Park)
- Kenneth Mejia, 20th Los Angeles City Controller
- Robert J. Sexton, producer and director (Hollywood United)
- Coyote Shivers, musician and actor (Hollywood United)
