= Westside, Los Angeles =

Los Angeles Westside
- Region
- Location within West Los Angeles
- Coordinates: 34.04153°N 118.425392°W
- Country: United States
- State: California
- County: Los Angeles

Population (2000)
  - Total: 529,427
- Cities: Los Angeles; Beverly Hills; Culver City; Santa Monica; Malibu
- Unincorporated areas: Marina del Rey; Ladera Heights

The Westside of Los Angeles is an urban region in western Los Angeles County, California, United States, containing part of the City of Los Angeles, independent municipalities, and unincorporated areas of the county. It has no official definition, but sources like LA Weekly and the Mapping L.A. survey of the Los Angeles Times place the region on the western side of the Los Angeles Basin south of the Santa Monica Mountains.

== Geography ==
=== LA Weekly ===
According to LA Weekly, there are different perspectives on where the Westside ends and the Eastside begins. Generally, the Westside is considered the area south of the Santa Monica Mountains and Sepulveda Pass, and west of either:

- Downtown Los Angeles – a historic definition supported by UCLA urban and cultural historian Eric Avila. Most of the numbered streets and big boulevards get a “west” before their names west of Main Street and an east if they are “east” of Main Street.
- The 110 Freeway
- La Cienega Boulevard
- The 405 Freeway

=== Mapping L.A. boundaries ===
Los Angeles Times readers submitted more than 300 maps, with borders ranging from Lincoln to La Brea and beyond. The most common east/west dividing lines were: Downtown, La Cienega Boulevard (the most common street cited), and the 405 freeway (the most common answer).

The Times analyzed the results, and no single definition approached a majority. Ultimately, the Los Angeles Times Mapping Project settled on a definition comprising 101.28 square miles (262 km^{2}), encompassing not only districts in the city of Los Angeles but also two unincorporated neighborhoods of L.A. County, plus the cities of Beverly Hills, Culver City, and Santa Monica — while excluding all of the city of West Hollywood, even areas west of La Cienega Boulevard.

== Neighborhoods and districts ==
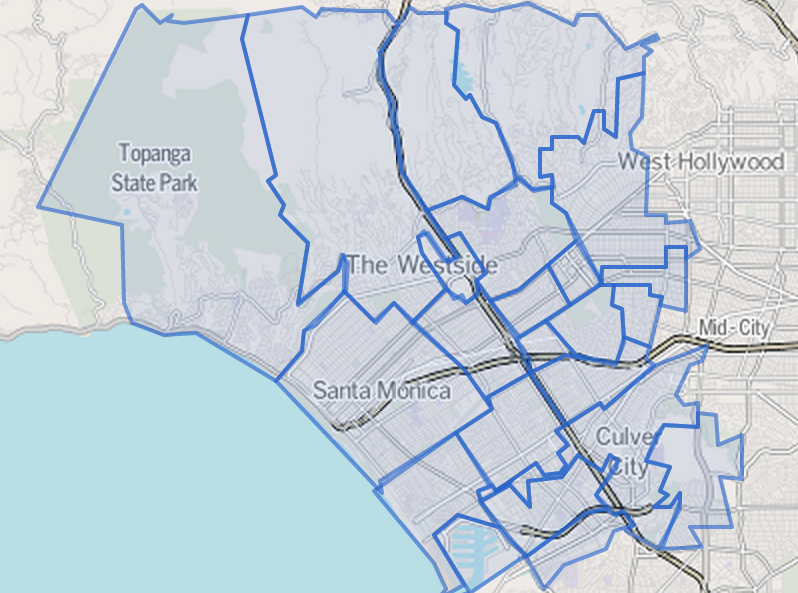
The Westside. Map by the Los Angeles Times.

According to the Mapping L.A. survey of the Los Angeles Times, the Westside includes all of the below neighborhoods that are part of the city of Los Angeles:

- Bel Air
- Beverly Crest
- Beverlywood
- Beverly Grove
- Brentwood
- Century City
- Del Rey
- Cheviot Hills
- Mar Vista
- Marina Peninsula
- Pacific Palisades
- La Cienega Heights
- Palms
- Pico-Robertson
- Playa Vista
- Rancho Park
- Sawtelle
- Venice
- West Los Angeles
- Westwood

=== Other cities ===
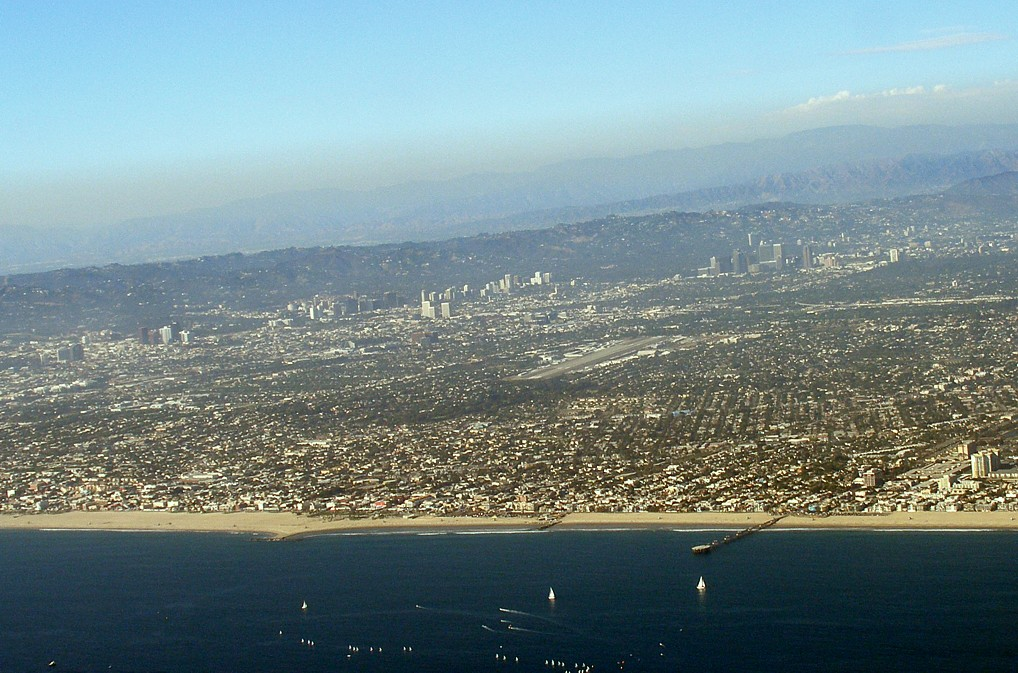
The Westside as seen by aircraft departing Los Angeles International Airport

- Beverly Hills
- Culver City
- Malibu
- Santa Monica

=== Unincorporated areas ===
- Ladera Heights
- Marina del Rey
- Alsace

== Population ==
In the 2000 census, the Westside (as defined by the Los Angeles Times Mapping Project) had a population of 529,427. At that time, non-Hispanic whites made up 63% of the population. The areas within the city of Los Angeles that the Los Angeles Almanac recognized as part of the Westside had a population of 413,351.

== Education ==
According to Census Bureau figures quoted by the Los Angeles Times, fifty-three percent of West Los Angeles residents aged 25 and older had earned a 4-year degree (or higher) by 2000. This included 89,620 people with master's degrees or higher and 117,695 with bachelor's degrees. In addition, 95,187 people in that age range had some college experience, 46,823 held high school diplomas, and 40,451 had dropped out before graduating. As of 2019, the median income of the neighborhood was approximately $96,300.

The Westside is home to the University of California, Los Angeles (UCLA), a public research university located in the Westwood neighborhood. It is the second-oldest of the ten campuses of the University of California system. UCLA is considered a flagship campus of the University of California system, along with UC Berkeley. It offers undergraduate and graduate degree programs across a wide range of disciplines. With an approximate enrollment of 28,000 undergraduate and 12,000 graduate students, UCLA is the university with the largest enrollment in the state of California and the most popular university in the United States by number of applicants.

Other post-secondary schools in the Westside are as follows:

- Otis College of Art and Design
- Santa Monica College, first opened in 1929 as Santa Monica Junior College. Current enrollment is over 30,000 students in more than 90 fields of study.
- West Los Angeles College, which offers associate degrees, vocationally oriented programs, and transfer programs to four-year universities.
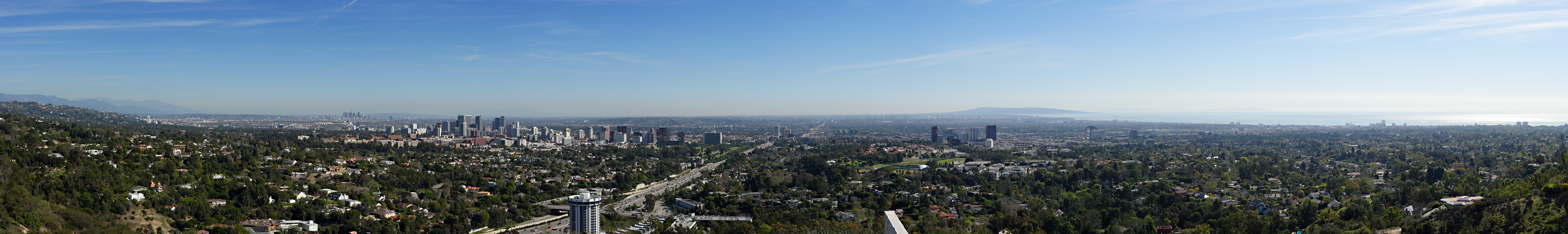
The view from the Getty Center, centered on the Westside as the 405 goes through the Sepulveda Pass in the Santa Monica Mountains and down through the city

== See also ==
- List of districts and neighborhoods in Los Angeles
- History of Los Angeles

Other regions of Los Angeles County

- Angeles National Forest
- Antelope Valley
- Central Los Angeles
- Eastside
- Harbor
- Northeast Los Angeles
- Northwest County
- Pomona Valley
- San Fernando Valley
- San Gabriel Valley
- South Bay
- Santa Monica Mountains
- South Los Angeles
- Southeast County
- Verdugos
- Westside
