= Carthay, Los Angeles =

- Neighborhood of Los Angeles
- Location within Los Angeles
- Coordinates: 34°03′19″N 118°22′11″W
- Country: United States
- State: California
- County: Los Angeles
- Time zone: Pacific
- Zip Code: 90035
- Area codes: 213, 323

Carthay is a half-square-mile neighborhood in Central Los Angeles, California. It contains Carthay Circle, Carthay Square and South Carthay. There are three Los Angeles Historic Preservation Overlay Zones in Carthay.

== Geography ==
The neighborhood of Carthay comprises Carthay Circle, Carthay Square and South Carthay.

As delineated by the Los Angeles Times Mapping Project, Carthay is bounded on the north by Wilshire Boulevard, on the east by Fairfax Avenue, on the south by Pico Boulevard, on the west by La Cienega Boulevard and on the northwest by Schumacher and Tower Drives.

It is flanked by Beverly–Fairfax to the north, Mid-Wilshire to the east, Mid-City to the south, and Pico–Robertson to the west, and Beverly Hills to the northwest.

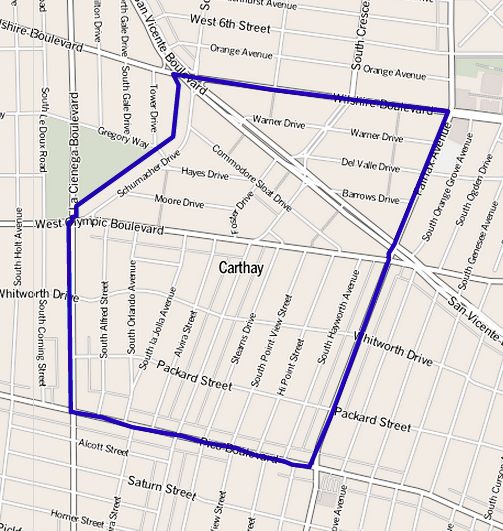
Map of Carthay, Los Angeles, as delineated by the Los Angeles Times

Carthay Circle

== Population ==
The 2000 U.S. census counted 4,866 residents in the half-square-mile neighborhood—amounting to 9,642 people per square mile, about an average population density for the city and the county. In 2008 the city estimated that the population had increased to 5,120. The median age for residents was 37, older than the city's average.

Carthay was said to be "highly diverse" when compared to the city at large. The ethnic breakdown in 2000 was: 57.8% non-Hispanic white; 15.9% Latino; 12.8% Black; 8.5% Asian; 5.1% of other races. Mexico (26.4%) and Korea (8.2%) were the most common places of birth for the 25.1% of the residents who were born abroad, a figure that was considered low for the city as a whole.

The median household income in 2008 dollars was $71,398, considered to be a high figure in Los Angeles. The percentage of households earning $125,000 or more was high, compared to the county at large. The average household size of 2.1 people was low for Los Angeles. Renters occupied 64.7% of the housing units, and home- or apartment owners the rest.

In 2000, there were 168 military veterans, 4.1% of the population, considered a low rate for the county overall, but the percentage of veterans who served during World War II or the Korean War was among the county's highest.

Carthay residents aged 25 and older holding a four-year degree amounted to 53.2% of the population in 2000, a high rate for both the city and the county.

== Historic Preservation Overlay Zones ==
Carthay contains three Los Angeles Historic Preservation Overlay Zones. They are the Carthay Circle HPOZ, South Carthay HPOZ, and the Carthay Square HPOZ.

== Education ==
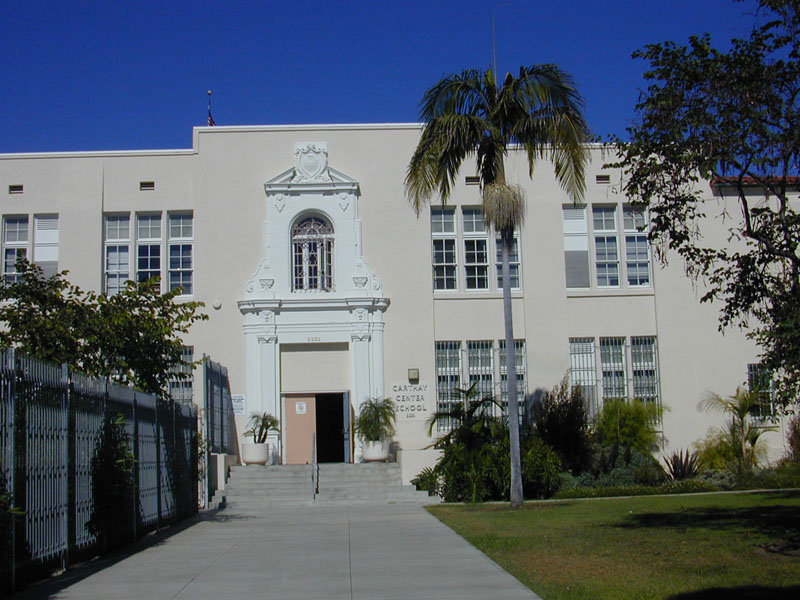
Carthay Center School

There is one school within Carthay's boundaries—Carthay Center Elementary, a K–6 school at 6351 West Olympic Boulevard. Starting in Fall 2014, Carthay Center Elementary became Carthay School of Environmental Studies Magnet, a residential full-school magnet. Spaces are reserved for students in the traditional attendance boundaries, but the school is also open to magnet school applicants from throughout LAUSD. The Environmental Studies program will be building on programs such as the celebrated Garden Science program at the school.

== See also ==
- Carthay Circle Theatre
