= Mid-City West, Los Angeles =

Los Angeles neighborhood in Central LA

Coordinates: 34.0255°N 118.4874°W

Mid-City West
- Neighborhood of Los Angeles
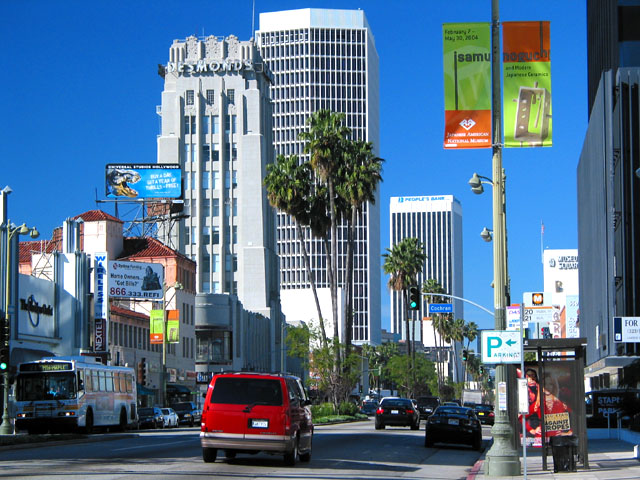
- Miracle Mile is a neighborhood in Mid-City West
- Interactive map of Mid-City West
- Country: United States
- State: California
- County: Los Angeles
- City: Los Angeles
- Time zone: UTC-8 (PST)
  - Summer (DST): UTC-7 (PDT)
- ZIP Code: 90036
- Website: MidCityWest.org

Mid-City West is an area in the western part of Central Los Angeles that is served by the Mid City West Neighborhood Council. It contains the neighborhoods of Beverly–Fairfax, Beverly Grove, Carthay Circle, Melrose, Miracle Mile and Park La Brea.

== Geography ==
=== Boundaries ===
It encompasses the area:

- South of Santa Monica Boulevard, Beverly Boulevard, Willoughby Avenue, Romaine Street, West 6th Street, and Wilshire Boulevard.
- West of La Brea Avenue.
- North of San Vicente Boulevard, Olympic Boulevard, the Pico-Robertson neighborhood border (Olympic Boulevard and San Vicente Boulevard), Burton Way, and Clifton Way.
- East of Doheny Drive, North Kings Road, North Sweetzer Avenue, La Cienega Boulevard, Schumacher Drive, Robertson Boulevard, San Vicente Boulevard, and North Gardner Street.

The area borders the city of West Hollywood on the north; the city of Beverly Hills and South Robertson neighborhood council area on the west; and the P.I.C.O. neighborhood council area on the west (containing South Carthay, Carthay Square, CHAPS, Redondo Sycamore, Melrose, Citrus Square, La Brea–Hancock, and Sycamore Square)

Most of Mid-City West is located in the Wilshire Community Plan area, but the part north of Rosewood Avenue is located in the Hollywood Community Plan area.

=== Neighborhoods in Mid-City West ===
The following neighborhoods are within the boundaries established by the Mid-City West Neighborhood Council: Beverly–Fairfax, Beverly Grove, Burton Way, Carthay Circle, Melrose, Miracle Mile and Park La Brea.

== See also ==
- Neighborhood councils of Los Angeles
