= Beverly Grove, Los Angeles =

District and neighborhood of Los Angeles, California, US

Coordinates: 34.074037°N 118.376355°W

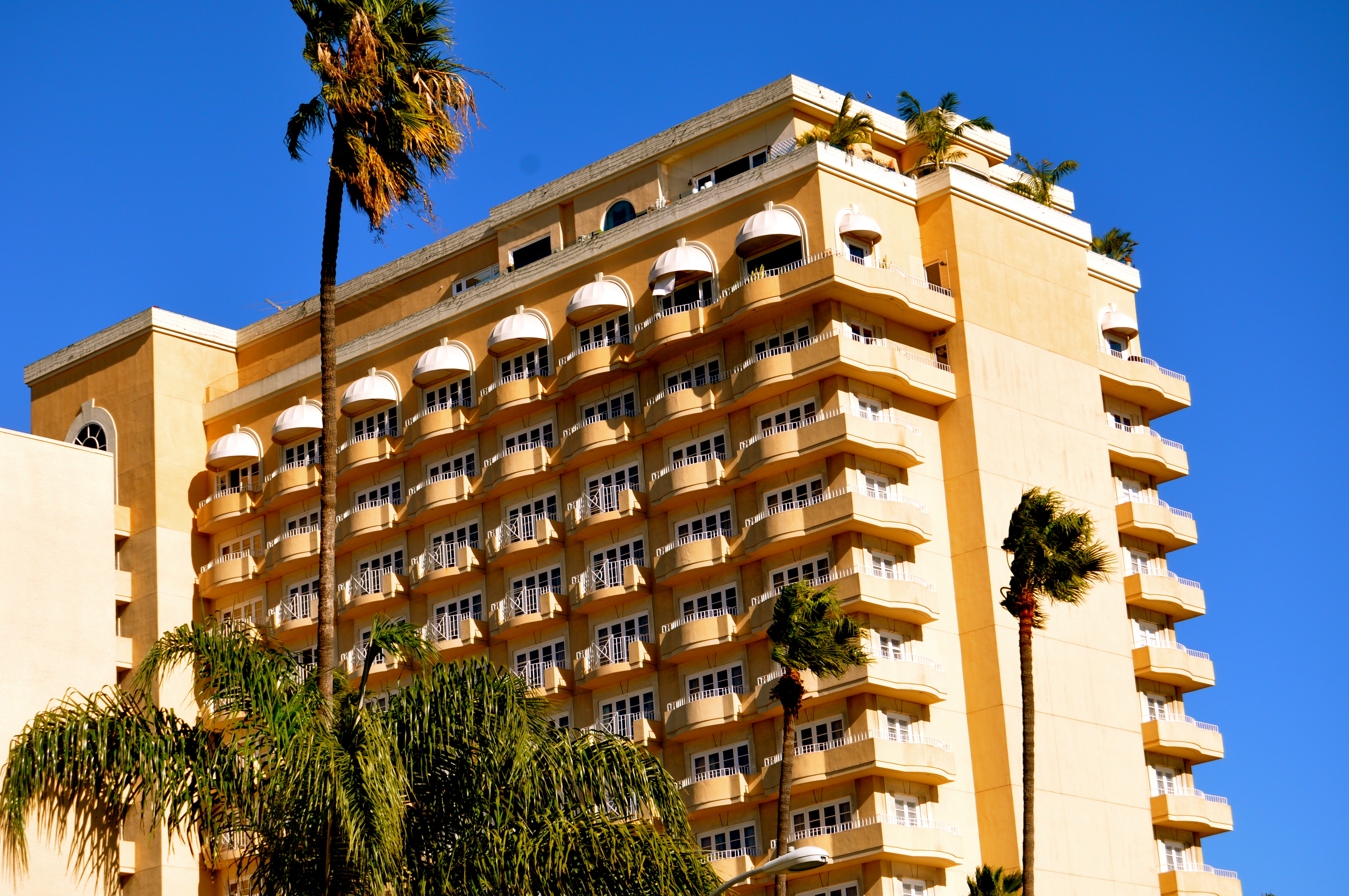
Four Seasons Hotel Los Angeles at Beverly Hills

Beverly Grove is a neighborhood within the Mid-City West region of Los Angeles, California, adjacent to Beverly Hills and West Hollywood. The median household income in 2026 dollars was $115,975, among the highest for Los Angeles and the county.

== Geography ==
=== City of Los Angeles ===
The term "Beverly Grove" was first used in 2006 to unofficially refer to a small residential area that was proposed to be subject to an anti-mansionization ordinance. It referred to an area in the Wilshire Community Plan area that was generally bounded by Colgate Avenue on the north, Fairfax Avenue on the east, Lindenhurst Avenue on the south, and San Vicente Boulevard on the west.

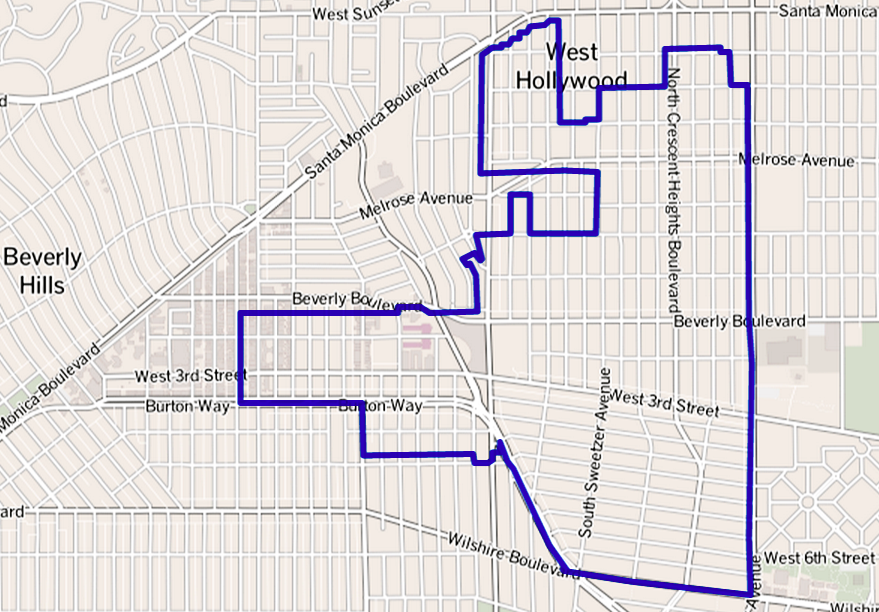
Map of Beverly Grove, Los Angeles, as delineated by the Los Angeles Times

=== Los Angeles Times' Mapping L.A. boundaries ===
In a departure from its first draft, the Los Angeles Times Mapping L.A. project maps Beverly Grove as bounded on the north and west by the West Hollywood and Beverly Hills city limits, on the east by Fairfax Avenue and on the south by Wilshire Boulevard and San Vicente Boulevard. It abuts the city limits of Beverly Hills to the west, West Hollywood to the north, Fairfax and Mid-Wilshire to the east, and Carthay to the south.

In the first draft of Mapping L.A., "Beverly Grove" was not included as a distinct neighborhood; rather, the area was shown as part of the Fairfax District. The Times database editor and its map project's coordinator later acknowledged in 2014 that "Beverly Grove" had not been a well established name.

Ongoing debates over zoning, housing density, and anti-mansion policies in Mid-City West neighborhoods such as Beverly Grove have continued into the 2020s amid broader citywide efforts to balance preservation with housing demand.

== History ==
According to the Los Angeles Conservancy, the Beverly Grove area was built primarily in the 1920s and has a "combination of quiet charm and close proximity to shopping, restaurants, and museums".

Easton's Gym, 8053 Beverly Blvd., in 1976

In 2008, the city adopted ordinance 182754 which amended Section 12.04 of the Los Angeles Municipal Code by amending the zoning map because "the area unofficially known as Beverly Grove (located in the Wilshire Community Plan and generally bounded by Colgate Avenue on the north, Fairfax Avenue on the east, Lindenhurst Avenue on the south, and San Vicente Boulevard on the west) continues to experience out-of-scale development with a noticeable increase in demolitions and the construction of new single-family dwellings. A Residential Floor Area Supplemental Use District (RFA) was created to "in order to ensure that new development matches the scale and character of existing buildings in the surrounding area".

== Demographics ==
The following data applies to the boundaries set by Mapping L.A.:

The 2000 U.S. census counted 21,417 residents in the 1.65-square-mile neighborhood—an average of 12,990 people per square mile, fairly normal for Los Angeles. In 2008, the city estimated that the population had increased to 22,855. The median age for residents was 38, old for both the city and the county.The 2020 U.S. census counted 25,430 residents in the 1.65-square-mile neighborhood—an average of 15,412 people per square mile. The median age is now 39.

The percentage of white people living in the area was 82%. Other ethnicities in 2000 were Latinos, 6%; Asians, 5,1%; blacks, 2%; and others, 4.9%. Iran (20.2%) and Poland (7.4%) were the most common places of birth for the 36.3% of the residents who were born abroad, a figure that was considered average for the city as a whole. In 2020, the percentage of white people living in the area was 69%. 11% were hispanic, 10% were Asian, 6% were two or more races and 3% were African American.

The median household income in 2026 dollars was $115,975, among the highest for Los Angeles and the county. Renters occupied 73% of the housing units, and house or apartment owners the rest.

The percentages of never-married men and women, 51% and 49%, respectively, are the county's highest.

== Education ==
Half of Beverly Grove residents aged 25 and older possessed a four-year degree in 2020, a high rate for both the city and the county. The percentage of residents with a master's degree is also high; 27% of residents possess one.

Public schools:

- Laurel Early Education Center (Pre-K)
- Rosewood STEM Magnet (K-5)
- Laurel Cinematic Arts & Creative Technologies Magnet (K-8)

Students are zoned to Fairfax High School in the adjacent Fairfax District.

== Notable places ==
- The Beverly Center. Opened in 1982 by developers A. Alfred Taubman, Sheldon Gordon and E. Phillip Lyon, it features various designer stores and restaurants. The site's former occupant was a small amusement park known as Beverly Park.
- Edinburgh Bungalow Court: Spanish Colonial Revival complex, Los Angeles historic-cultural monument No. 1105 designated in 2016 on the corner of Edinburgh and Waring avenues.
- The Four Seasons Hotel Los Angeles at Beverly Hills. A luxury, five-star hotel.
- Third Street shopping district. Located between Fairfax and La Cienega.

== Notable people ==
- Shawn Mendes, singer, songwriter, model, and actor

== See also ==
- List of districts and neighborhoods of Los Angeles
