= Mid-Wilshire, Los Angeles =

Mid-Wilshire
- Neighborhood
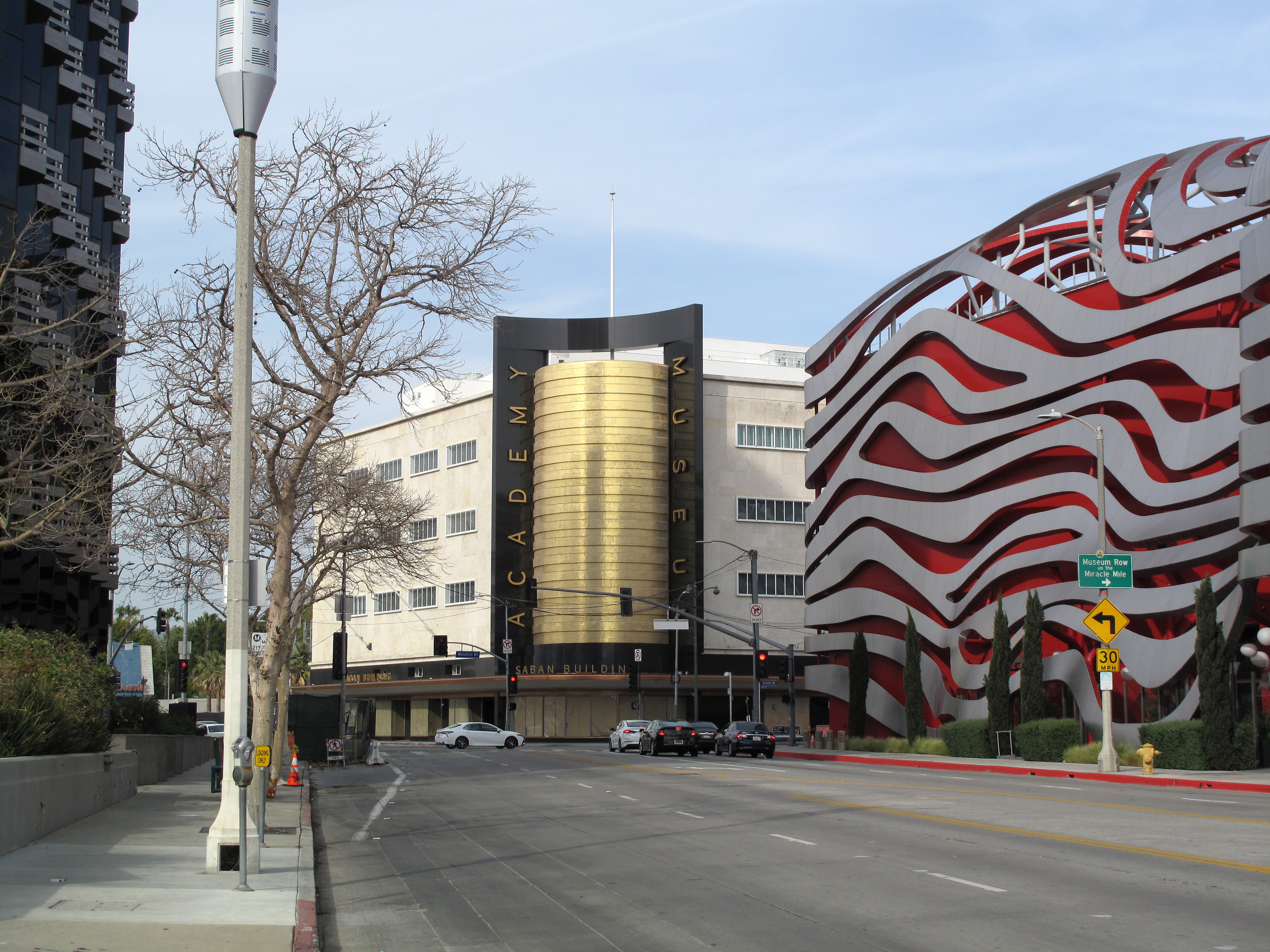
- Petersen Automotive Museum

- Location within West Los Angeles
- Coordinates: 34.0648°N 118.3614°W
- Country: United States
- State: California
- County: Los Angeles
- City: Los Angeles
- Time zone: UTC-8 (PST)
  - Summer (DST): UTC-7 (PDT)
- Zip Code: 90010
- Area code: 323

Mid-Wilshire is a neighborhood in the central region of Los Angeles, California. It is known for the Los Angeles County Museum of Art, the Petersen Automotive Museum, and the Miracle Mile shopping district.

== Geography ==
=== City of Los Angeles boundaries ===
According to the city's official community plan, the Wilshire Community Plan Area (CPA), also known as the Wilshire District, "is bounded by Melrose Avenue and Rosewood Avenue to the north; 18th Street, Venice Boulevard and Pico Boulevard to the south; Hoover Street to the east; and the Cities of West Hollywood and Beverly Hills to the west." The adjacent CPAs are Hollywood to the north; South Central Los Angeles and West Adams–Leimert–Baldwin Hills to the south; Silver Lake–Echo Park–Elysian Valley and Westlake to the east; and West Los Angeles to the west.

The Wilshire area includes the neighborhoods of (roughly from east to west) Wilshire Center, Koreatown (part of which extends outside the CPA), Windsor Square, Hancock Park, Larchmont, Mid-Wilshire, Mid-City, Miracle Mile, Beverly–Fairfax, and the Carthay neighborhoods (commonly known as Carthay Circle, South Carthay, and Carthay Square).

Within the Wilshire CPA, the neighborhood of Mid-Wilshire is bounded roughly by Crenshaw Boulevard, Pico Boulevard, Fairfax Avenue, and Wilshire Boulevard. Part of Miracle Mile overlaps with Mid-Wilshire.

=== Mapping L.A. boundaries ===
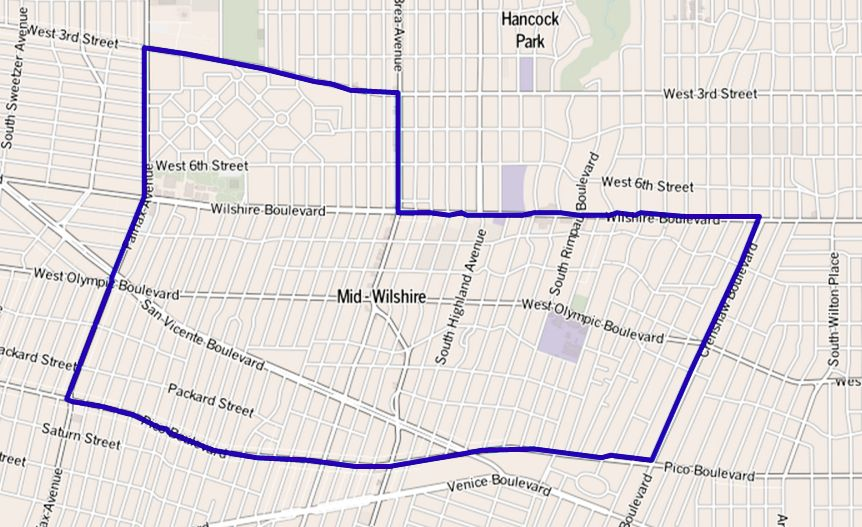
Map of Mid-Wilshire, Los Angeles. (as delineated by the Los Angeles Times)

According to the Los Angeles Times Mapping L.A. project, Mid-Wilshire is bounded on the north by West Third Street, on the northeast by La Brea Avenue and Wilshire Boulevard, on the east by Crenshaw Boulevard, on the south by Pico Boulevard and on the west by Fairfax Avenue.

Mid-Wilshire is flanked by Fairfax, Hancock Park, and Windsor Square to the north; Koreatown and Arlington Heights to the east; Mid-City to the south; and Mid-City West (Carthay and Beverly-Fairfax) to the west and northwest.

== Neighborhoods ==
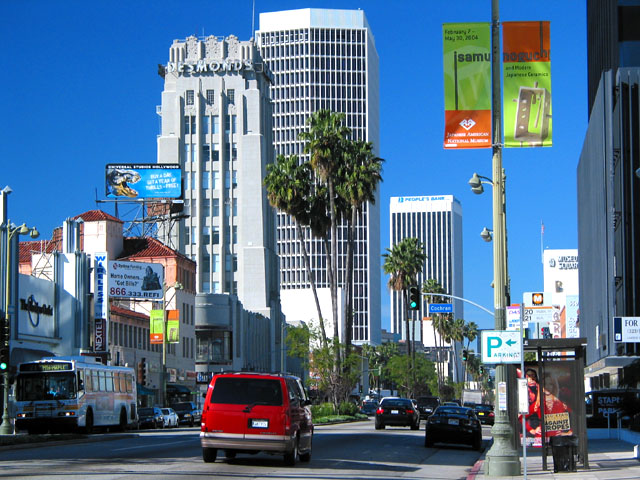
Miracle Mile at the heart of Mid-Wilshire, 2004

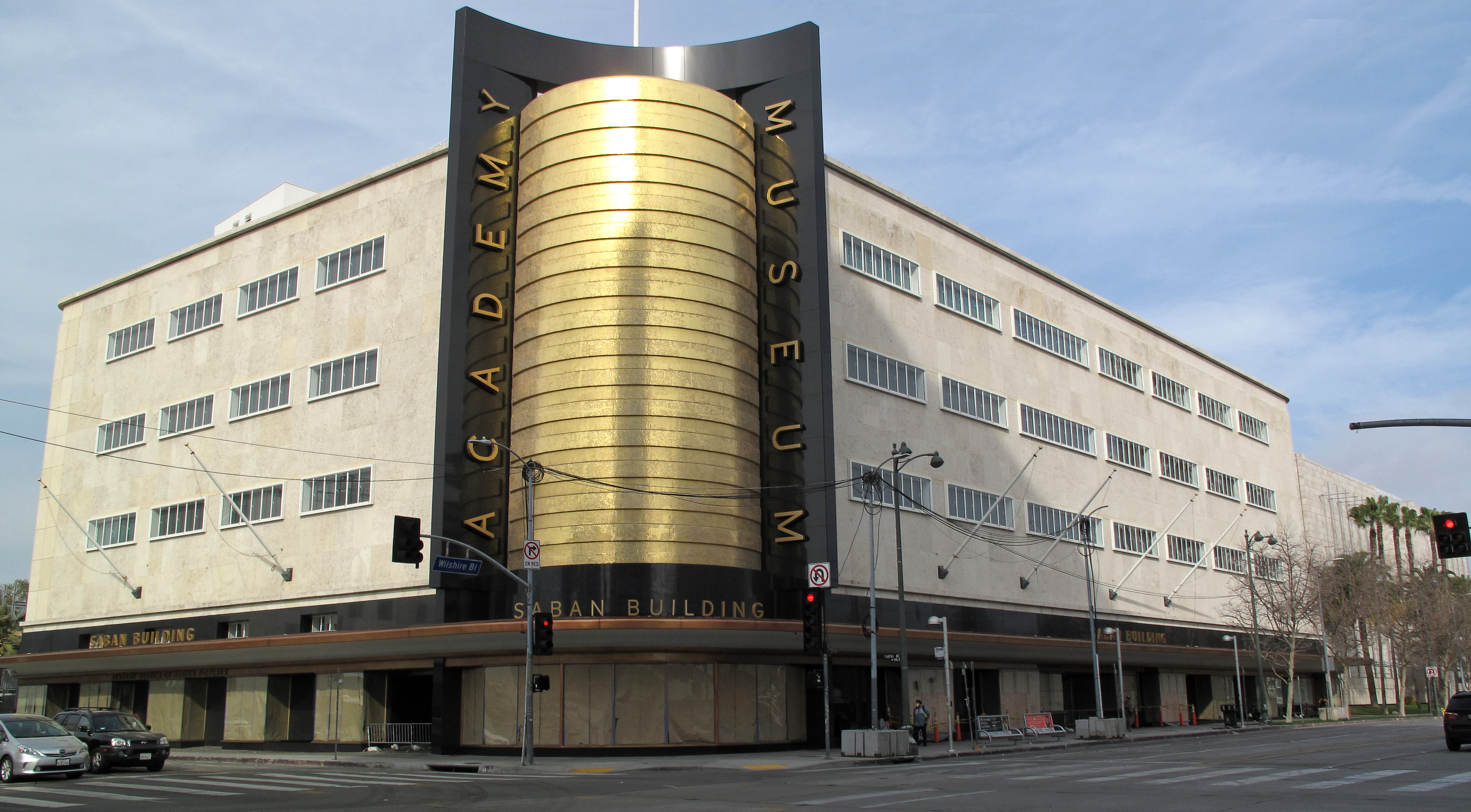
The historic May Company Building (now part of the Academy Museum of Motion Pictures, at the intersection of Wilshire and Fairfax in Mid-Wilshire

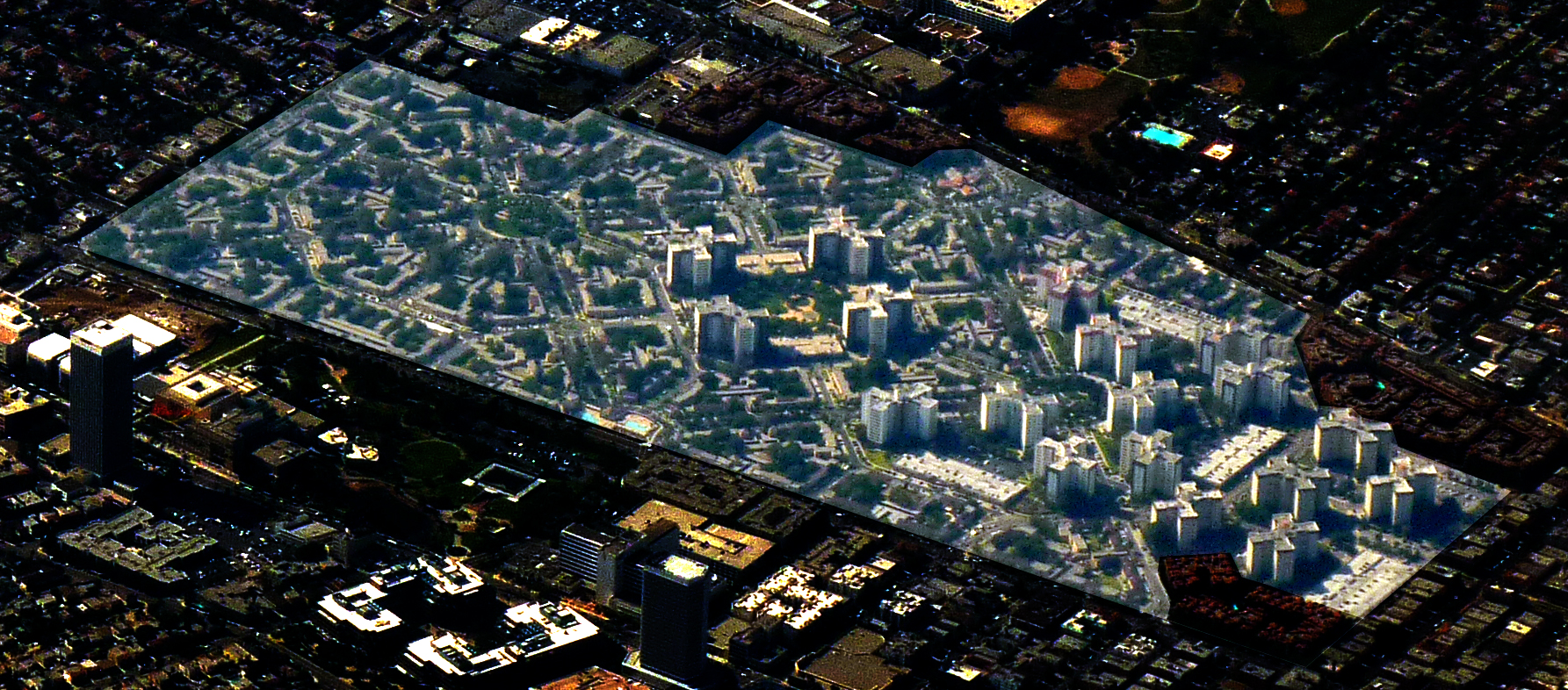
Park La Brea, 2009

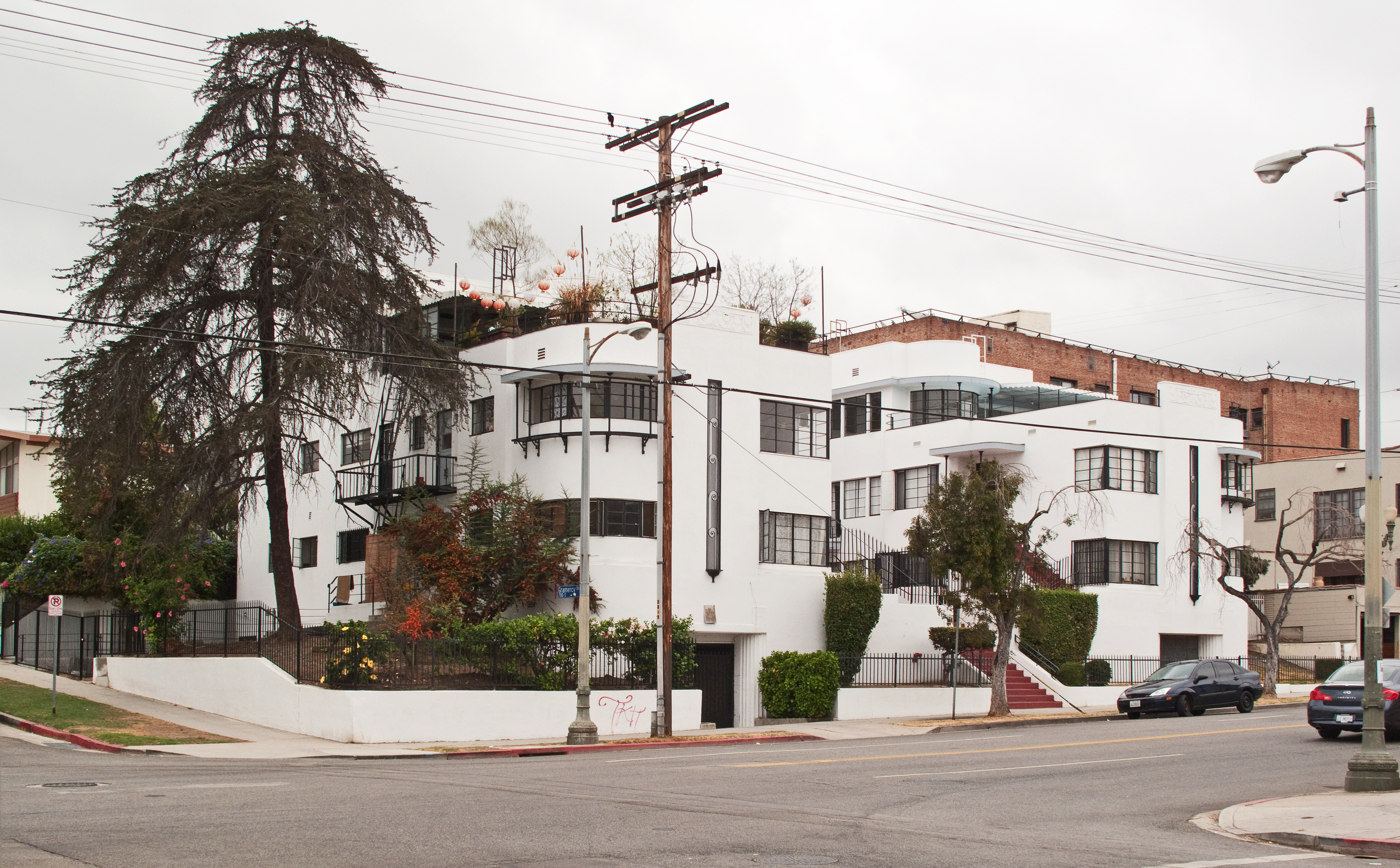
Historic Richardson Apartments at Gramercy Drive and Eighth Street, 2012

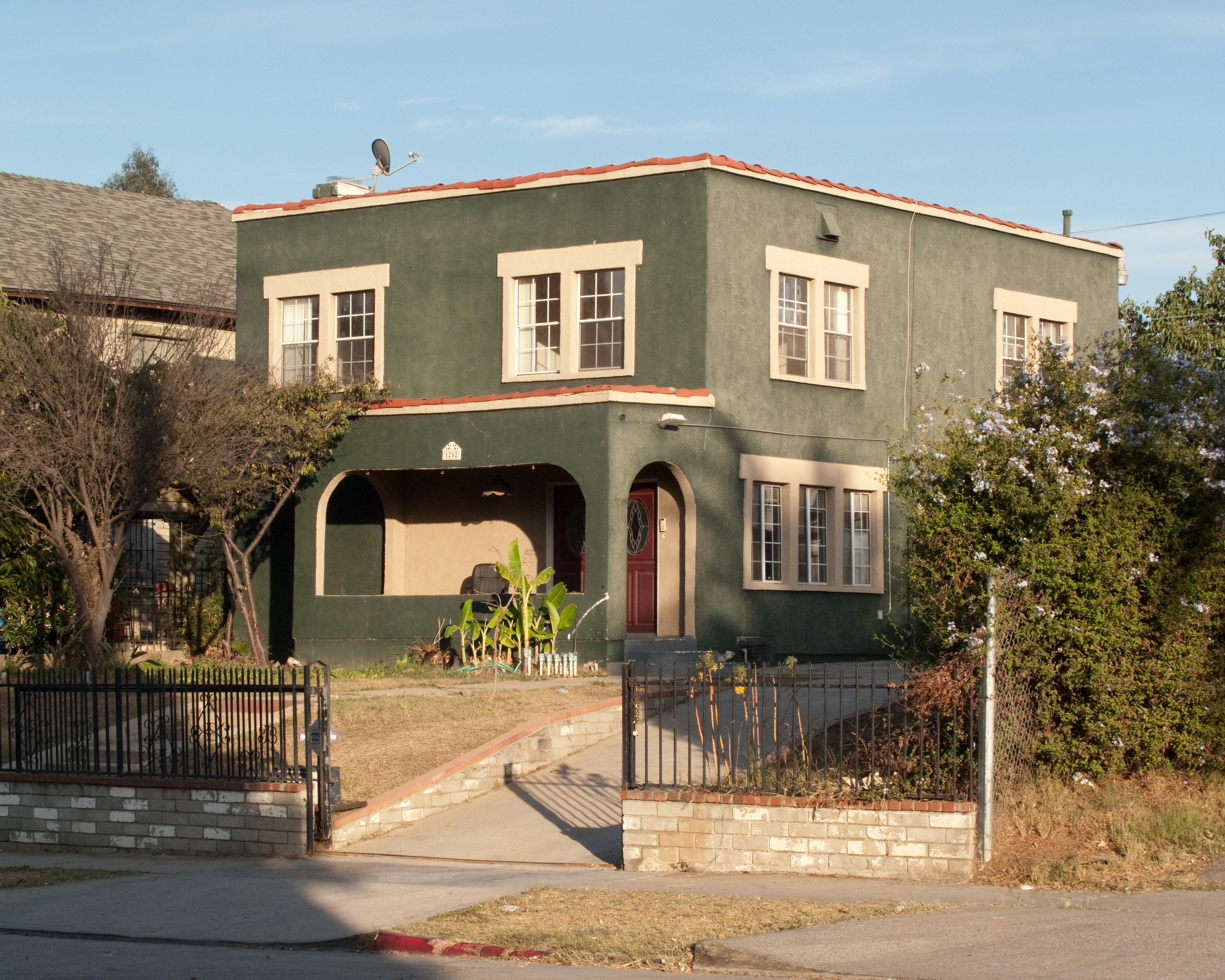
William Grant Still residence at 1262 South Victoria Avenue, 2012

Mid-Wilshire includes the following neighborhoods:

=== Little Ethiopia ===
Little Ethiopia is a block-long stretch of Fairfax Avenue between Olympic Boulevard and Whitworth Drive in Los Angeles, California. The area has a high concentration of Ethiopian restaurants, as well as a significant concentration of residents of Ethiopian and Eritrean ancestry.

=== Miracle Mile ===
Miracle Mile is a 1.5-mile (2.4 km) stretch of Wilshire Boulevard between Fairfax and Highland Avenues. In the early 1920s, Wilshire Boulevard west of Western Avenue was an unpaved farm road, extending through dairy farms and bean fields. Developer A. W. Ross saw the area's potential and developed Wilshire as a commercial district to rival downtown Los Angeles.

=== Oxford Square ===
Oxford Square is an historic neighborhood which, according to the Oxford Square Neighborhood Association, lies between Pico Boulevard and Olympic Boulevard and includes both sides of Victoria Avenue and South Windsor Boulevard.

In 1910 the neighborhood was laid out between Wilshire Boulevard on the north and Pico Street on the south, west of the Los Angeles Country Club. It was served by the Pico Street streetcar line. The unimproved lots offered by developer Emil Firth ranged from 50 to 100 feet on the street and were 171 feet deep. The streets were 70 feet wide, with 15-foot sidewalks and parkways, which were to be planted with palm trees and flowers. Ornamental electroliers were to be placed every 300 feet. Lot prices ranged from $1,000 to $2,500.

Earlier, in 1907. the Harriman interests had begun a four-track subway line across Oxford Square, south of Wilshire Boulevard.

In 1991 the City Council approved a request by Oxford Square - Windsor Village residents to close 10th Street at Victoria Avenue in an effort to reduce crime in the communities after a recent outbreak of burglaries and robberies, as well as one homicide.

In February 2015 the neighborhood association was lobbying to form an Historic Preservation Overlay Zone (HPOZ). That would have put a temporary moratorium on the issuance of city building and demolition permits. Los Angeles City Council approved the HPOZ, adopting its preservation plan effective March 26, 2017.

=== Park La Brea ===
Park La Brea is an apartment complex bounded by 3rd Street on the north, Cochran Avenue on the east, Sixth Street on the south, and Fairfax Avenue on the west. With 4,255 units located in eighteen 13-story towers and 31 two-story "garden apartment buildings," it is the largest housing development in the United States.

=== Park Mile ===
Park Mile is a commercial strip that lies along Wilshire Boulevard between Highland Avenue on the west, Wilton Place on the east, Sixth Street on the north and Eighth Street on the south. Some of the office buildings in the district have been designed to harmonize with the nearby Hancock Park area, with long, horizontal warm look of brick and other textures rather than a vertical high-tech design. Construction is regulated by the Park Mile Ordinance, adopted by the city in 1979. It was designed to protect the single-family nature of the residential area and to promote development that provided Park Mile with an "image and sense of continuity." There is a three-story height limit along Park Mile, as well as a ban on painted signs on the outside of buildings. In 1990 a Park Mile-Wilshire District neighborhood design review board, composed of five to seven volunteers appointed by City Council members, was one of four such local boards throughout the city that oversaw architectural planning.

=== Sycamore Square ===
Sycamore Square is a neighborhood located between Hancock Park to the north, Miracle Mile to the west, and Brookside to the east. It is bordered by Wilshire Boulevard to the north, Olympic Boulevard to the south, La Brea Avenue to the west, and both sides of Citrus Avenue to the east.

=== Wilshire Vista ===
Wilshire Vista is a neighborhood of 1,700 homes. It contains two Los Angeles Cultural Historic Monuments.

Hancock Park

Main article: Hancock Park, Los Angeles

== Population ==
The 2000 U.S. census counted 41,683 residents in the 2.78-square-mile neighborhood—an average of 14,988 people per square mile, among the highest population densities for the city and the county. In 2008 the city estimated that the population had increased to 47,176. The median age for residents was 34, about the city's average.

Mid-Wilshire was said to be "highly diverse" when compared to the city at large. The ethnic breakdown in 2000 was whites, 33.6%; blacks, 22.7%; Latinos, 19.9%; Asians, 19.8%; and others, 3.9%. Mexico (16.1%) and Korea (24%) were the most common places of birth for the 25.1% of the residents who were born abroad, a figure that was considered average for the city as a whole.

The median household income in 2008 dollars was $58,483, average for Los Angeles. The average household size of 2.1 people was low for Los Angeles. Renters occupied 78.3% of the housing units, and home- or apartment owners the rest.

Mid-Wilshire residents aged 25 and older holding a four-year degree amounted to 45.2% of the population in 2000, a high rate for both the city and the county. The percentage of residents with a master's degree was also high.

== Libraries and parks ==
Public facilities are provided by City of Los Angeles: the Department of Recreation and Parks and the Los Angeles Public Library.

== Schools ==
Public schools are part of the Los Angeles Unified School District. The schools operating within Mid-Wilshire are:

- Los Angeles Senior High School, LAUSD, 4650 West Olympic Boulevard
- Los Angeles Community Adult School, 4650 West Olympic Boulevard
- Hancock Park Elementary School, LAUSD, 408 South Fairfax Avenue
- Wilshire Crest Elementary School, LAUSD, 5241 West Olympic Boulevard
- Queen Anne Place Elementary School, LAUSD, 1212 Queen Anne Place
- Queen Anne Recreation Center, Recreation and Parks, 1240 West Blvd

== Landmarks and attractions ==
- The Wilshire Ebell Theater, Los Angeles Historic-Cultural Monument #250.
- Los Angeles County Museum of Art, the Page Museum, Hancock Park and the La Brea Tar Pits on the north side of Wilshire Boulevard between Fairfax and Curson avenues.
- The Miracle Mile, a commercial strip on Wilshire Boulevard east of Fairfax Avenue designed in the 1920s by developer A. W. Ross to attract and serve automobile traffic rather than pedestrian shoppers.
- Petersen Automotive Museum, on the southeast corner of Wilshire Boulevard and Fairfax Avenue. One of the world's largest automobile museums, the Petersen is a nonprofit organization specializing in automobile history and related educational programs.
- Olympia Medical Center, formerly Midway Hospital Medical Center, between Olympic and San Vicente boulevards.
- Harold A. Henry Park, named after the former city councilman, at Ninth Street and Plymouth Boulevard.
- Los Angeles High School Memorial Park, with its associated Memorial Library, dedicated to the L.A. High graduates who took part in World War I. It is on Olympic Boulevard between Mulllen and Muirfield avenues, facing Los Angeles High across the street.
- Queen Anne Recreation Center, at 12th Street and West Boulevard, with an auditorium, barbecue pits, a baseball diamond, basketball courts, children's play area, picnic tables, and tennis courts.
- Town and Country shopping center, on the southeast corner of Third Street and Fairfax Avenue.
- William Grant Still Residence, located at 1262 South Victoria Avenue; Los Angeles Historic-Cultural Monument #169.

== Notable residents ==
- Christian Audigier – French fashion designer
- Leonard Cohen – Canadian singer and novelist
- William Grant Still – African-American composer, known for Symphony No. 1 "Afro-American"

== See also ==
- List of districts and neighborhoods of Los Angeles
- Boyle Workman, representing the Wilshire Ward on the City Council, 1925–27
