= Verdugos =

Region of Los Angeles County, California

Coordinates: 34.214°N 118.284°W

The Verdugos is a region of Los Angeles County, California including the areas in and around the Verdugo Mountains.

== Geography ==
According to the Mapping L.A. survey of the Los Angeles Times, the Verdugos region consists of:

- Altadena
- Glendale
- La Crescenta-Montrose
- La Cañada Flintridge
- Pasadena
- Sunland
- Tujunga

== Population ==
In the 2000 census, the Verdugos region had a population of 453,399.

== See also ==
Other regions of Los Angeles County

- Angeles National Forest
- Antelope Valley
- Central Los Angeles
- Eastside
- Gateway Cities
- Harbor
- Northeast Los Angeles
- Pomona Valley
- San Fernando Valley
- San Gabriel Valley
- Santa Clarita Valley
- South Bay
- Santa Monica Mountains
- South Los Angeles
- Verdugos
- Westside
