= Henry Lion =

American sculptor

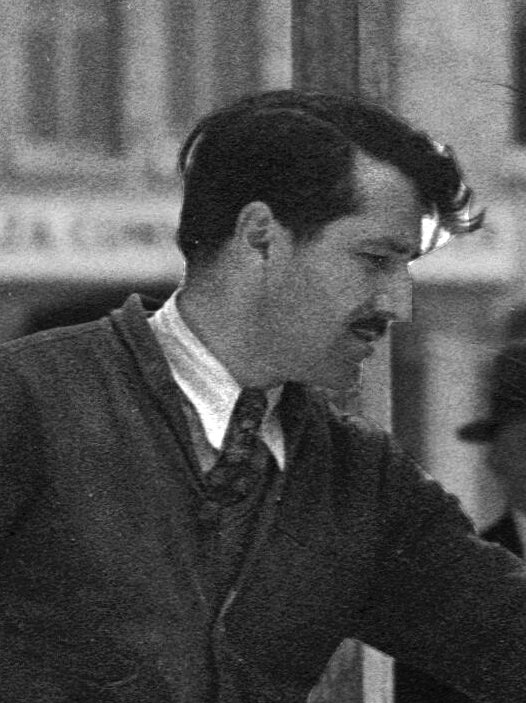
- Lion in 1932
- Born: August 11, 1900; Fresno, California, United States
- Died: October 25, 1966 (aged 66); Los Angeles, California, United States
- Occupation: Sculptor

Henry Lion (August 11, 1900 – October 25, 1966) was an American sculptor. His work was part of the sculpture event in the art competition at the 1932 Summer Olympics.

His first significant work, a bronze statue called The Pioneer, was installed in 1925 in Carthay Circle, Los Angeles as an homage to the neighborhood's founder, Daniel O'Connell McCarthy.

His 7½ foot cast bronze statue of the Spanish Colonial governor, Felipe de Neve, was installed in 1932 in the Los Angeles Plaza Park. The statue is mounted on a 4-foot boulder (1.2 m) and includes a bronze dedication plaque with the following inscription:

Felipe de Neve, 1728–84, Spanish governor of the Californias, 1775–82. In 1781 on the orders of King Carlos III of Spain, Felipe de Neve selected a site near the river Porciuncula and laid out the town of El Pueblo de la Reina de Los Angeles, one of 2 Spanish pueblos he founded in Alta California
