= Carthay Circle, Los Angeles =

Carthay Circle
- Neighborhood of Los Angeles
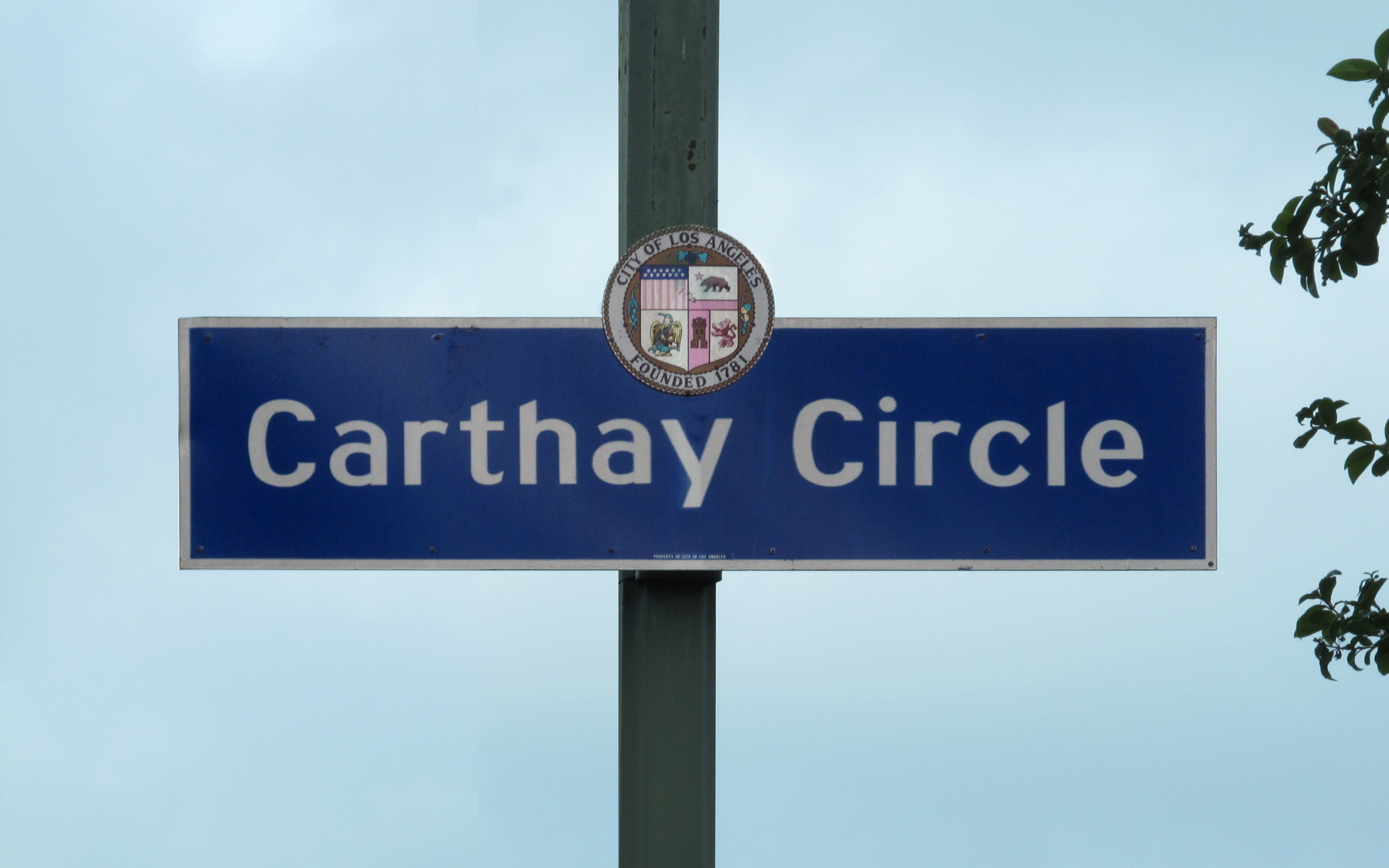
- Carthay Circle neighborhood sign located on Olympic Boulevard

- Location within Los Angeles
- Coordinates: 34°03′41″N 118°22′11″W
- Country: United States of America
- State: California
- County: Los Angeles
- Time zone: Pacific
- Zip Code: 90048
- Area code: 323

Carthay Circle is a neighborhood in the Mid-City West region of Central Los Angeles, California. Originally named Carthay Center, the neighborhood was later renamed after the famed Carthay Circle Theatre.

== Geography ==
The neighborhood is bounded by Wilshire Boulevard to the north, Olympic Boulevard to the south, Fairfax Avenue to the east and Schumacher Drive on the west. The neighborhood of South Carthay is located south of Olympic Boulevard. The city of Beverly Hills is located on the west.

== History ==
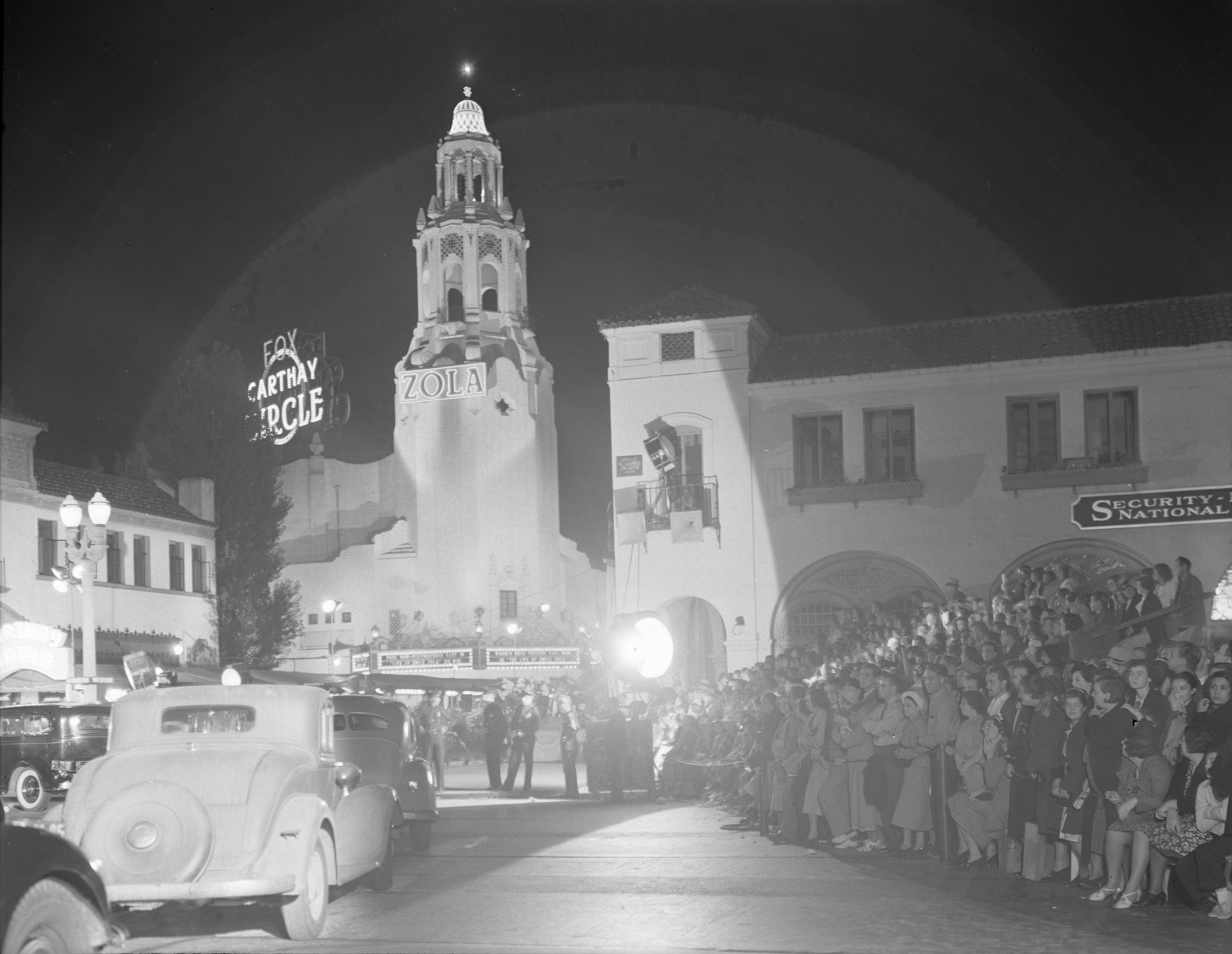
The historic Carthay Circle Theater.

Originally named Carthay Center, Carthay Circle was developed as an upscale residential district in 1922 by J. Harvey McCarthy, who founded the 136-acre, mainly Spanish Revival, community. No two homes are alike due to the rule that all homes had to be designed individually by an architect; notable designers such as Irving Gill, Paul Williams and Robert Byrd contributed to the neighborhood.

The master plan for Carthay Circle was designed by leading early 20th century architects Aleck Curlett and his partner Claud Beelman (designer of MGM Studios and Downtown LA's Eastern Columbia Building) in conjunction with landscape architects Cook & Hall (Wilbur D. Cook is also noted for creating the master plan for the neighboring city of Beverly Hills).

McCarthy named the streets in honor of prominent figures of the California Gold Rush. He also planned the neighborhood around a shopping center.

Carthay Circle was one of the first planned communities in Los Angeles, and the first in the city to feature underground utilities. The success of Carthay Circle served as the catalyst for the growth of the entire Mid-City area.

The main feature of the neighborhood was the Carthay Circle Theatre, the “Showplace of the Golden West," that opened May 18, 1926 and soon became the focal point of Carthay Center. The theater derived its name from the unusual shape of the auditorium-- a perfect circle. The theater, site of film premieres including Disney's Snow White and the Seven Dwarfs (their first full-length animated film) and the West Coast premiere of Gone with the Wind, inspired the community to change the name from “Carthay Center” to “Carthay Circle.” The theater was demolished in 1969 to make way for a new office complex, 1 Carthay Plaza, today known as Carthay Campus, designed in the mid-century Brutalist architectural style. A large-scale replica of Carthay Circle Theater opened in 2012 at Disney California Adventure Park in Anaheim, California.

In November 1983, with the support of then-councilman Zev Yaroslavsky, official neighborhood signs were installed. On July 11, 1987, the neighborhood held a dedication ceremony to celebrate the planting of 100 trees and the installation of two large concrete monuments with the name "Carthay Circle" on them. The monuments were installed at the intersection of McCarthy Vista and Wilshire Boulevard and the intersection of San Vicente Boulevard and Fairfax Avenue.

== Parks and recreation ==
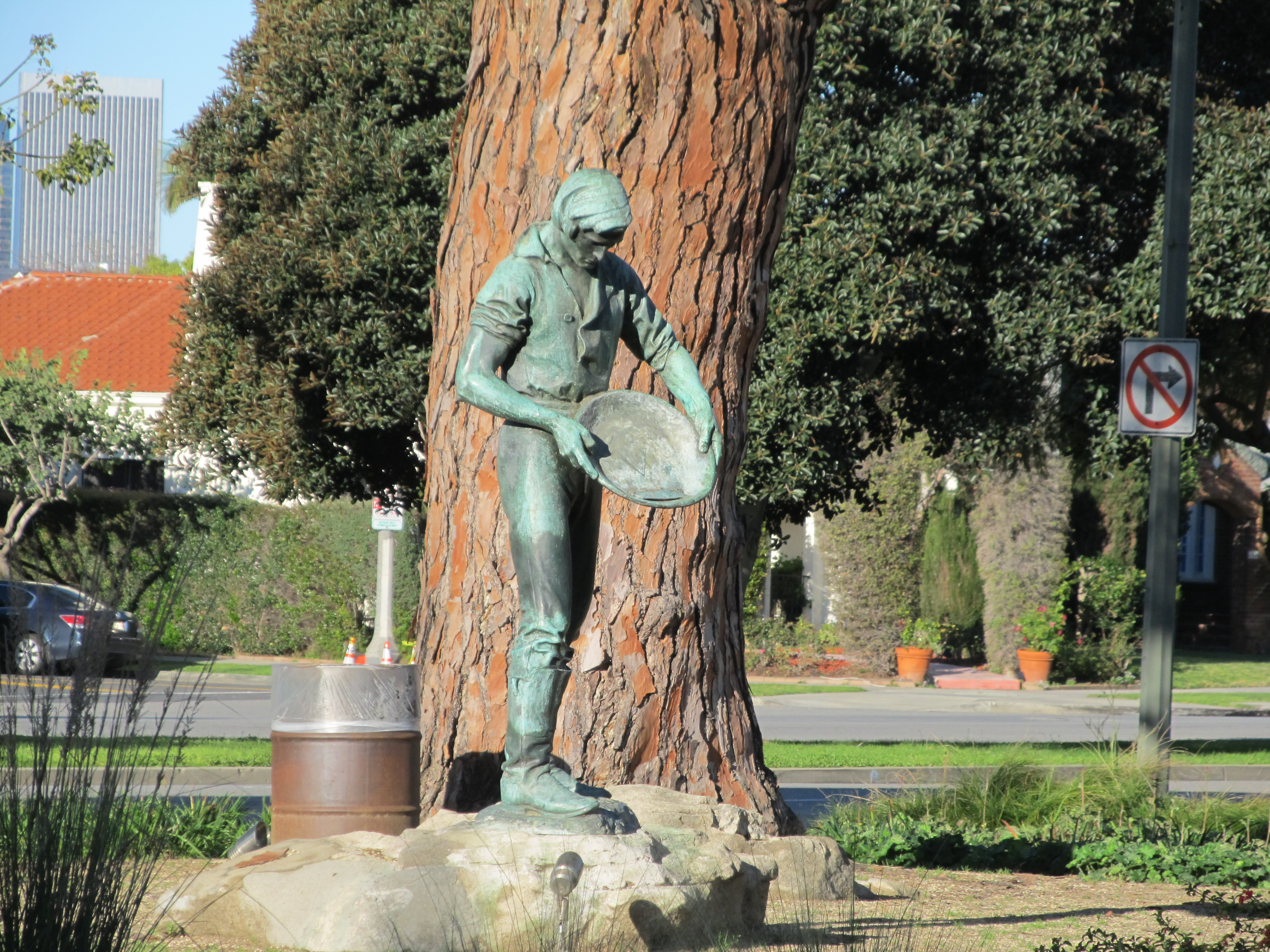
The Pioneer statue in Carthay Circle Park

- Carthay Circle Park - The park is located at the intersection of McCarthy Vista & Crescent Heights Boulevard and is maintained by the City of Los Angeles.

== Landmarks ==
The Pioneer is a statue by Henry Lion that was designed as part of a fountain in Carthay Circle Park. Standing about seven feet tall and weighing 512 pounds, it was installed on September 25, 1924. Also known as "Dan the Miner", the statue went missing in 2009. It has been stolen during a rash of robberies spawned by rising copper prices. The statue was recovered, repaired, and reinstalled in 2010.

Historical markers placed in the area by the Native Sons of the Golden West and Founders of Carthay Center include: Portolá Trail 1769, Juan Bautista de Anza, Daniel O. McCarthy, "Snowshoe" Thompson and Jedediah Strong Smith.

== Historic Preservation Overlay Zone ==
The Carthay Circle Historic Preservation Overlay Zone (HPOZ) adopting ordinance became effective on July 24, 1998. The Carthay Circle preservation plan was adopted by the City of Los Angeles on December 9, 2010.

The following architectural styles are present in the Carthay Circle HPOZ: Colonial Revival, Dutch Colonial Revival, English Tudor Revival, French Eclectic, Monterey Revival, Spanish Colonial Revival and Minimal Traditional. Objectives of the HPOZ include: Safeguarding the character of historic buildings and sites and recognizing and protecting the historic streetscape and development patterns.
