= Statue of Harrison Gray Otis =

Monument in Los Angeles, California, U.S.

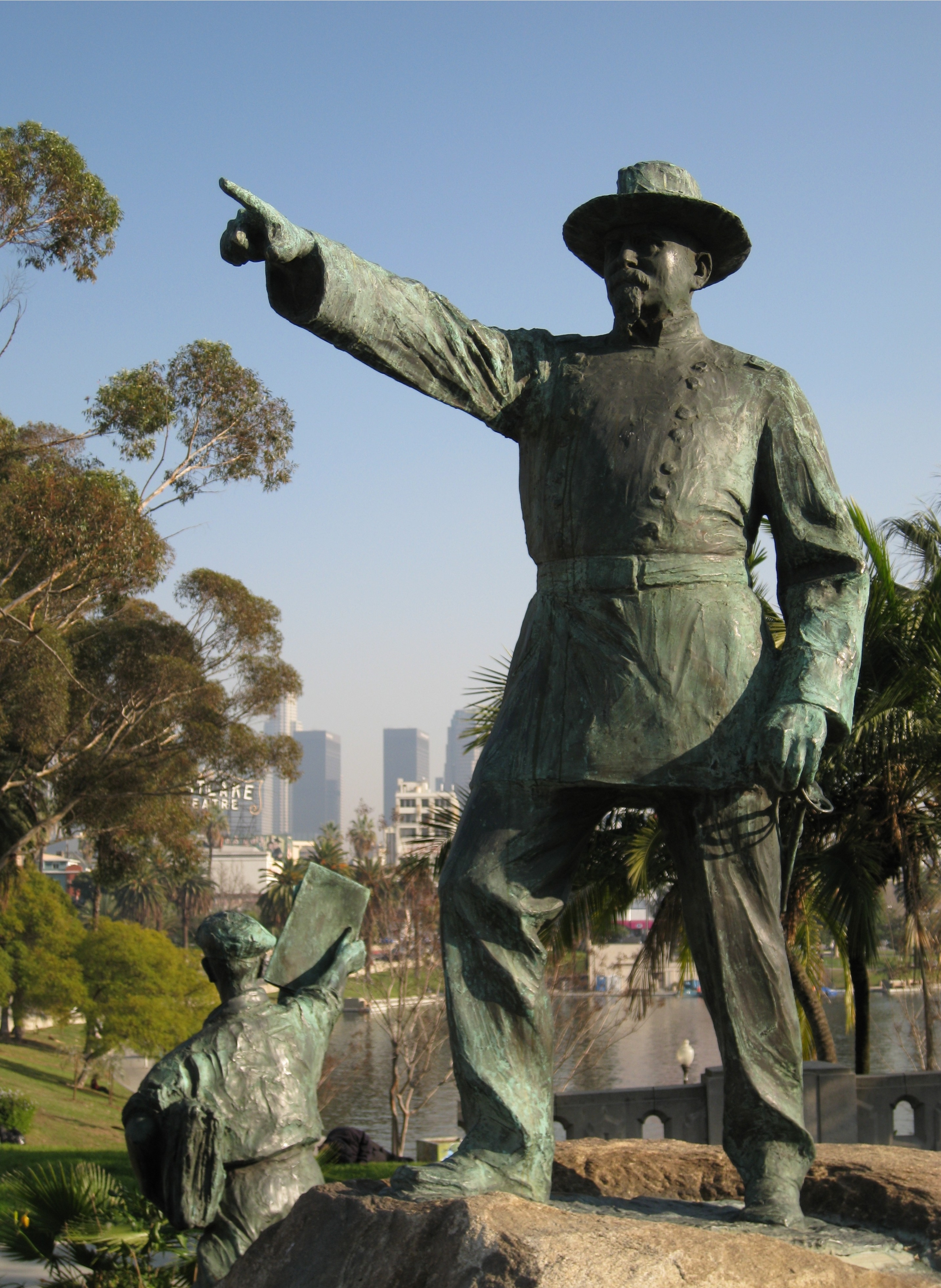
- Otis group (2008)
- Artist: Paul Troubetzkoy
- Year: 1918
- Completion date: 1920
- Medium: Bronze
- Location: Los Angeles, California, U.S.; 34°3′34″N 118°16′44.9″W

A statue of Harrison Gray Otis (sometimes called General Harrison Gray Otis) is installed in Los Angeles' MacArthur Park, in the U.S. state of California. The bronze statue was originally part of a sculptural group (sometimes called the "Otis Group") that originally included a newsboy and a soldier. The artist, Paul Troubetzkoy, won a design competition in 1918 and the final product was installed in 1920. The soldier has been absent for decades, the newsboy was stolen for its scrap metal value in March 2024. The theft was discovered by Anne-Lise Desmas, an art historian and Getty Museum curator who brought a colleague from the Louvre to the park to see Troubetzkoy's work and found the newsboy absent. Investigators believe that the metal thieves posed as city maintenance workers to avoid questions about what they were doing with the cast-bronze figure.

The model for the newsboy was Andrew Azzoni, whose father worked as a waiter at a restaurant patronized by Troubetzkoy.

A scene from the Buster Keaton film Hard Luck was shot at the statue in 1921, at which time all three figures were still present.

The statue, standing in close proximity to Wilshire Boulevard, has been the victim of several car crashes.

The statue has recently been damaged by protesters during the June 2025 Los Angeles protests.

== Gallery ==
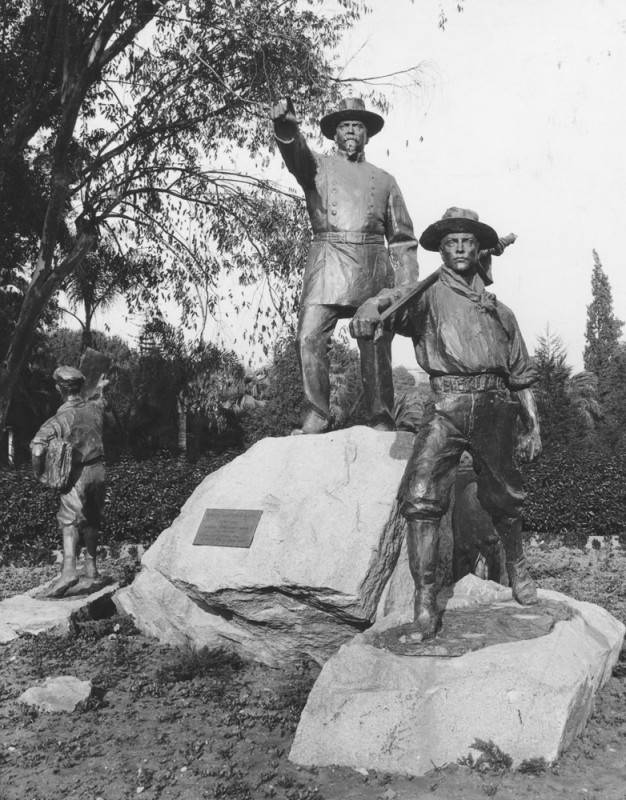
General Harrison Grey Otis statue at MacArthur Park, complete with "doughboy" and newsboy; likely photographed in the 1930s (Los Angeles Public Library WPA 6012)

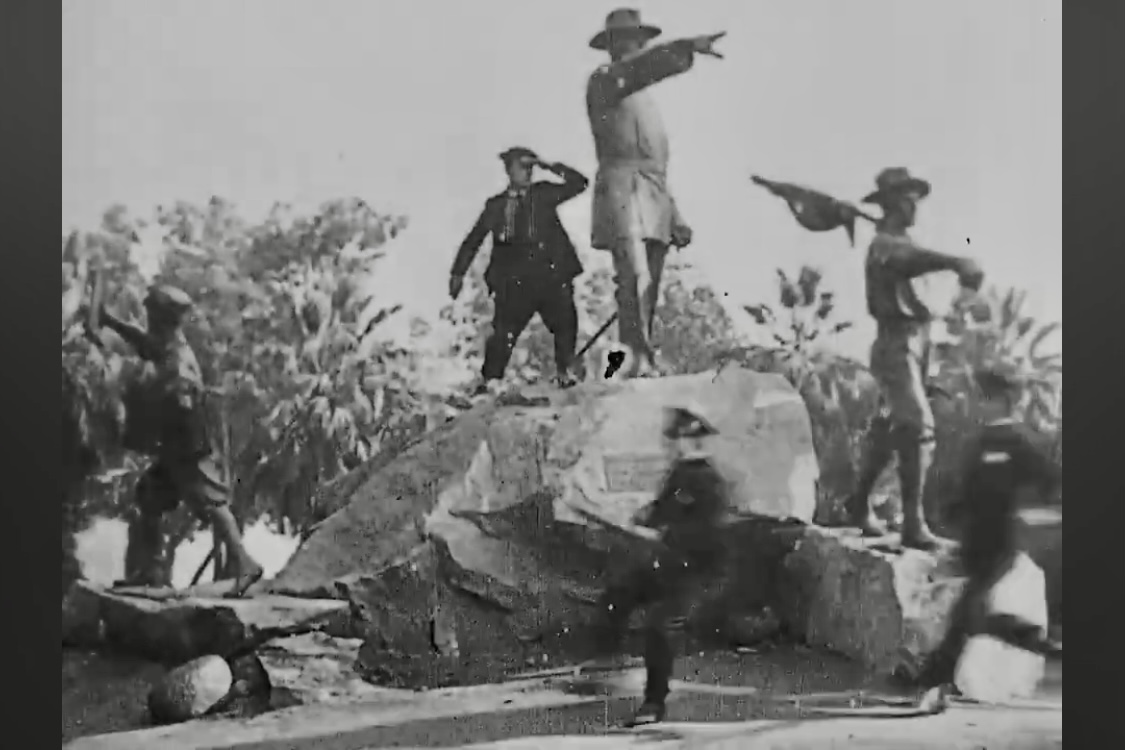
Buster Keaton's character in Hard Luck (1921) outwits pursuing lawmen by disguising himself as one of the Otis group figures in MacArthur Park, Los Angeles

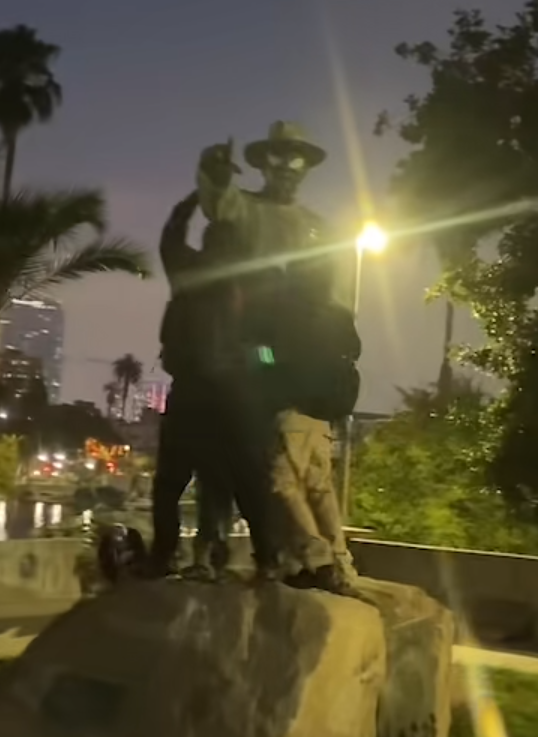
Protesters from the June 2025 Los Angeles protests attempting to topple a statue of General Harrison Grey Otis.

== See also ==
- The Pioneer (Los Angeles) - stolen for scrap and recovered in 2008
