= The Pioneer (Los Angeles) =

1925 bronze sculpture in California

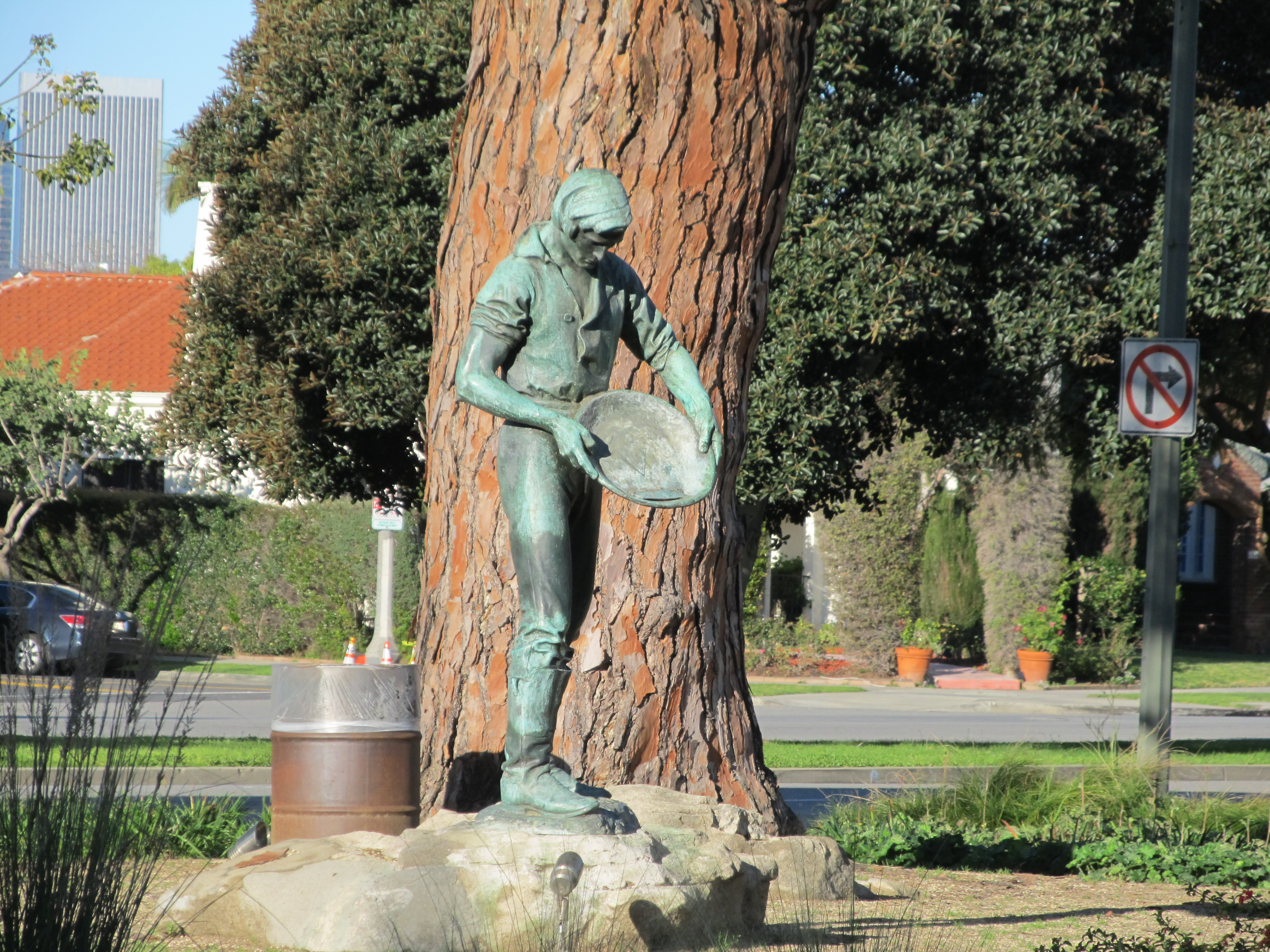
- The Pioneer (2019)
- Artist: Henry Lion
- Location: Los Angeles; 34.0613°N 118.3672°W

The Pioneer is a bronze sculpture of a 49er of the California Gold Rush. The statue was created in 1925 by Henry Lion and has long been a landmark of the Carthay Circle, Los Angeles neighborhood in California, United States, except for a brief period in 2008 when it was stolen. It was recovered at a scrap metal yard by the LAPD art-theft division and was reinstalled in January 2009. Created as an homage to the father of the founder of the Carthay Circle district, the statue is sometimes called Dan the Miner after its subject, Daniel O'Connell McCarthy. Originally part of a fountain opposite Carthay Circle Theatre, it was moved to the pocket park at McCarthy Vista and San Vicente Boulevard in 1969. The Pioneer was one of three California-historic-nostalgia monuments in the original layout of Carthay Circle, along with a boulder honoring Jedediah Smith and a sundial made of bricks of Mission San Juan Capistrano.

Lion told Betty Hoag in 1964 for the Archives of American Art oral history project, "[The Pioneer] was a competition, national competition, which I happened to win in 1924. I was just out of Otis; I was 25 years old. It was an anonymous competition and there was a thousand dollar prize in addition to the commission to do it. They gave me the commission and this seven-foot bronze was cast in New York by the Rollin Bronze Works."

== See also ==
- Statue of Harrison Gray Otis - another Los Angeles bronze, partially stolen in 2024 for scrap value
