= Stonehurst Historic Preservation Overlay Zone =

The Stonehurst Historic Preservation Overlay Zone is located in the Sun Valley neighborhood of Los Angeles, in the northeastern San Fernando Valley.

It is a city-designated Historic Preservation Overlay Zone (HPOZ).

== Architecture ==
Most of the 92 homes were built between 1923 and 1925 by Dan Montelongo, using local river stone from the Tujunga Wash. The neighborhood has the highest concentration of homes utilizing native river rock as a primary building material in Los Angeles.

The bungalows are often characterized as being "Stonemason Vernacular," a derivative of the American Craftsman architectural style.

The 1930 Stonehurst Park Community Building, also by Dan Montelongo, is a Los Angeles Historic-Cultural Monument in the HPOZ.

== See also ==
- List of Los Angeles Historic-Cultural Monuments in the San Fernando Valley
- History of the San Fernando Valley
