= Carthay Circle Theatre =

Former movie palace in Los Angeles, California, USA (1926-69)

Coordinates: 34.0608°N 118.368°W

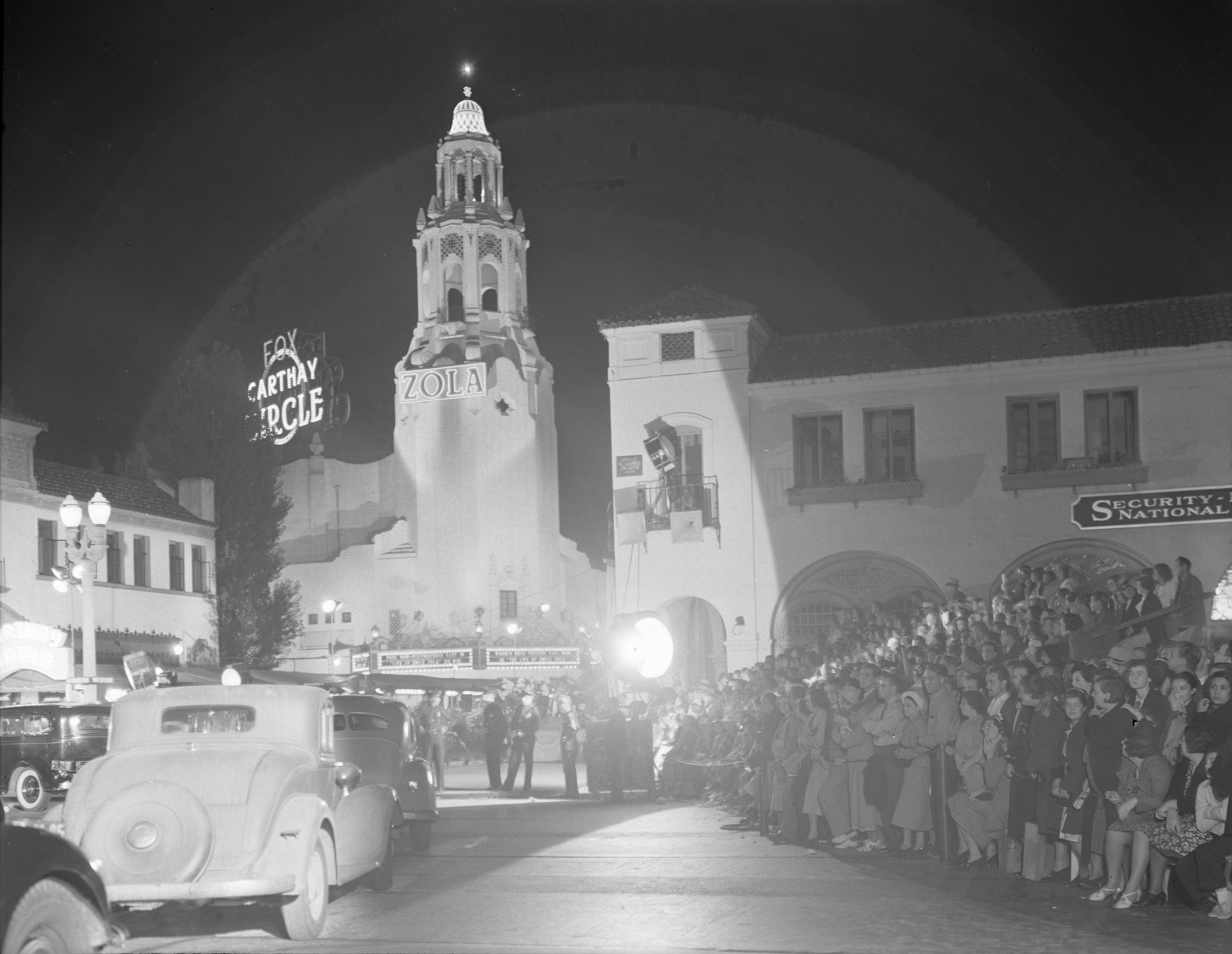
Premiere of Life of Emile Zola at the Carthay Circle Theater (1937)

The Carthay Circle Theatre was one of the most famous movie palaces of Hollywood's Golden Age. Located on San Vicente Boulevard in Los Angeles, California, it opened in 1926 and was demolished in 1969.

The auditorium itself was shaped in the form of a perfect circle, extended vertically into a cylinder, set inside a square that fleshed out the remainder of the building. It seated 1,150. Initially developed by Fox, it was called the Fox Carthay Circle Theater for its unique floorplan.

== Location ==
The Carthay Circle Theater opened at 6316 San Vicente Boulevard on May 18, 1926, with a showing of The Volga Boatman (1926), and was considered developer J. Harvey McCarthy's most successful monument, a stroke of shrewd thinking that made a famous name of the newly developed Carthay Center neighborhood in Los Angeles, California. (McCarthy's development was called Carthay Center—an anglicized version of his last name.) The Carthay Circle Theater became the focal point of Carthay Center, and Carthay Circle became the neighborhood's official name.

== Design ==
The exterior design was in the Spanish Colonial Revival style, with whitewashed concrete trimmed in blue, with a high bell tower and neon sign visible for miles. The architects were Carleton Winslow and Dwight Gibbs. The iconic octagonal tower was placed in the front corner spandrel space left between the circle and the square. The auditorium's cylinder-shaped wall was raised up above the roof line, to create a parapet visible from the outside that resembled a circus tent. "Simple, massive and dignified, the building stands out for its intrinsic beauty," raved The Architect and Engineer. Pacific Coast Architect wrote that it was a theatre "masked as a cathedral".

There was a drop curtain that featured a homage to the pioneer Donner Party that perished crossing the Sierra Nevada Mountains. Bronze busts of Native American leaders and photographs of Edwin Booth, Herbert Beerbohm Tree, Sarah Bernhardt, Eleanora Duse, Ellen Terry, Lillie Langtry, and other 19th century actors adorned the lounges and lobbies. Murals of historic scenes 40 feet tall graced the walls, painted by Pasadena artist Alson S. Clark.

== Premieres ==
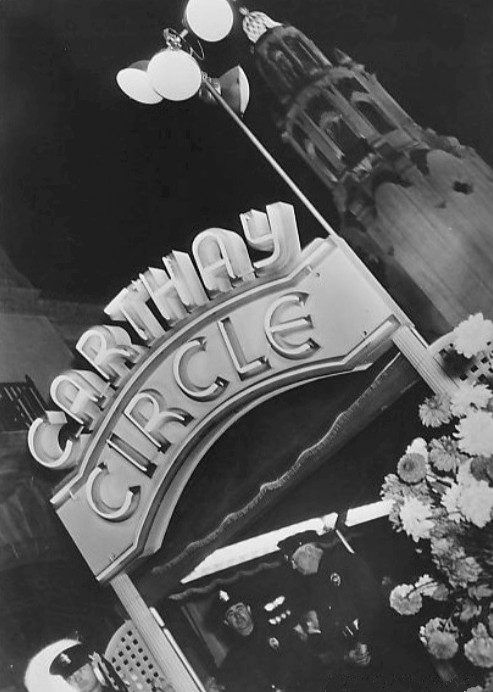
The premiere of High, Wide and Handsome at the theater in 1937.

The theatre hosted the official premieres of The Life of Emile Zola (1937), Romeo and Juliet (1936), Walt Disney's first animated feature-length film Snow White and the Seven Dwarfs (1937) and Gone with the Wind (1939), among many other notable films. For Disney's Fantasia (1940), the most elaborate audio system in use at the time, Fantasound, a pioneering stereophonic process, was installed at this theatre.

For the glamorous world premiere of MGM's Marie Antoinette (1938), with Norma Shearer and Tyrone Power, the gardens around the theater were restructured and enhanced to resemble the landscaping of the Palace of Versailles. In the 1930s and '40s, props from the sets of such premiered films as The Great Ziegfeld (1936), The Good Earth (1937), Captains Courageous (1937) and Gone with the Wind (1939) were displayed on the grassy median of McCarthy Vista, from Wilshire Boulevard south to San Vicente Boulevard. The premieres were red-carpet events, with the stars of the motion picture arriving in limousines at the entrance to the covered walkway to the theater south from San Vicente and cheered by hundreds of fans in bleachers there, accompanied by searchlights scanning the sky. Only Grauman's Chinese Theatre in Hollywood also had such elaborate premieres in that era.

In 1951 the first PATSY Award ceremony was held at the Carthay Circle. Presented by the American Humane Association, the event was hosted by Ronald Reagan, and honored Francis the Talking Mule as the first recipient of the award that honored animal actors.

== Decline ==
Although the Carthay Circle Theater had hosted the first-run "roadshow", reserved-seat engagements of a great many aesthetically- and economically important films, by the 1960s the "roadshow" concept, and, indeed, the Carthay Circle Theater itself, was considered an anachronism, overshadowed by modern multi-screen cinemas.

Its customer base had also been sapped by suburbanization, and many other economic factors, such as film print runs increasing almost exponentially from a few, high-quality, high-resolution, often "wide gauge", prints, to thousands of average-quality, lower-resolution prints, usually of "standard gauge".

The theater was demolished in 1969 by its owner, NAFI Corporation, which erected its headquarters and main computer operations center in its place; today, two low-rise office buildings and a city park occupy its former site.

== Later replicas ==
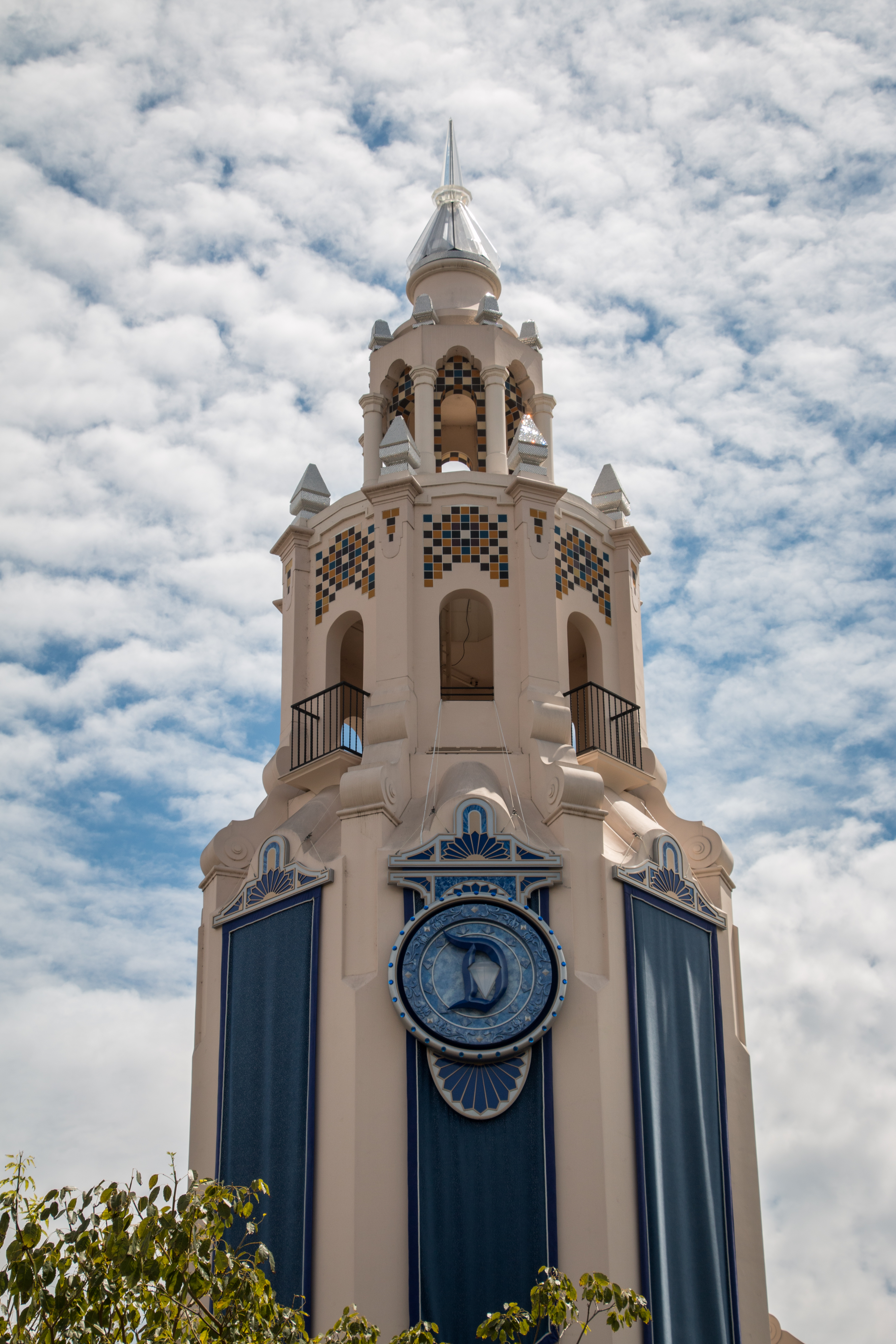
Carthay Circle Restaurant at Disney California Adventure, during the 60th Anniversary.

In July 1994, a smaller-scale pastiche of the facade of the theatre (primarily the octagonal tower) was opened as the "Once Upon a Time" gift shop on the Sunset Boulevard section in Disney's Hollywood Studios at Walt Disney World Resort in Florida. The store now sells clothing items for men and women.

In June 2012, a fanciful larger-scale replica of the theater building was opened in the Buena Vista Street section of Disney California Adventure Park at the Disneyland Resort in Anaheim, California. Although this replica is larger than the Orlando version, it is still slightly smaller than the 1926 original, and has a modified exterior footprint and interior floorplan. While there is no actual theatre inside, the building houses the "Carthay Circle Lounge" and the members-only "Club 1901" on the first floor, with the "Carthay Circle Restaurant" on the second floor. The original's signature circular floorplan is absent from the replica building, and the circular parapet is squared off from the outside.

== See also ==
- The Pioneer (Los Angeles)
