= South Carthay, Los Angeles =

South Carthay
- Neighborhood
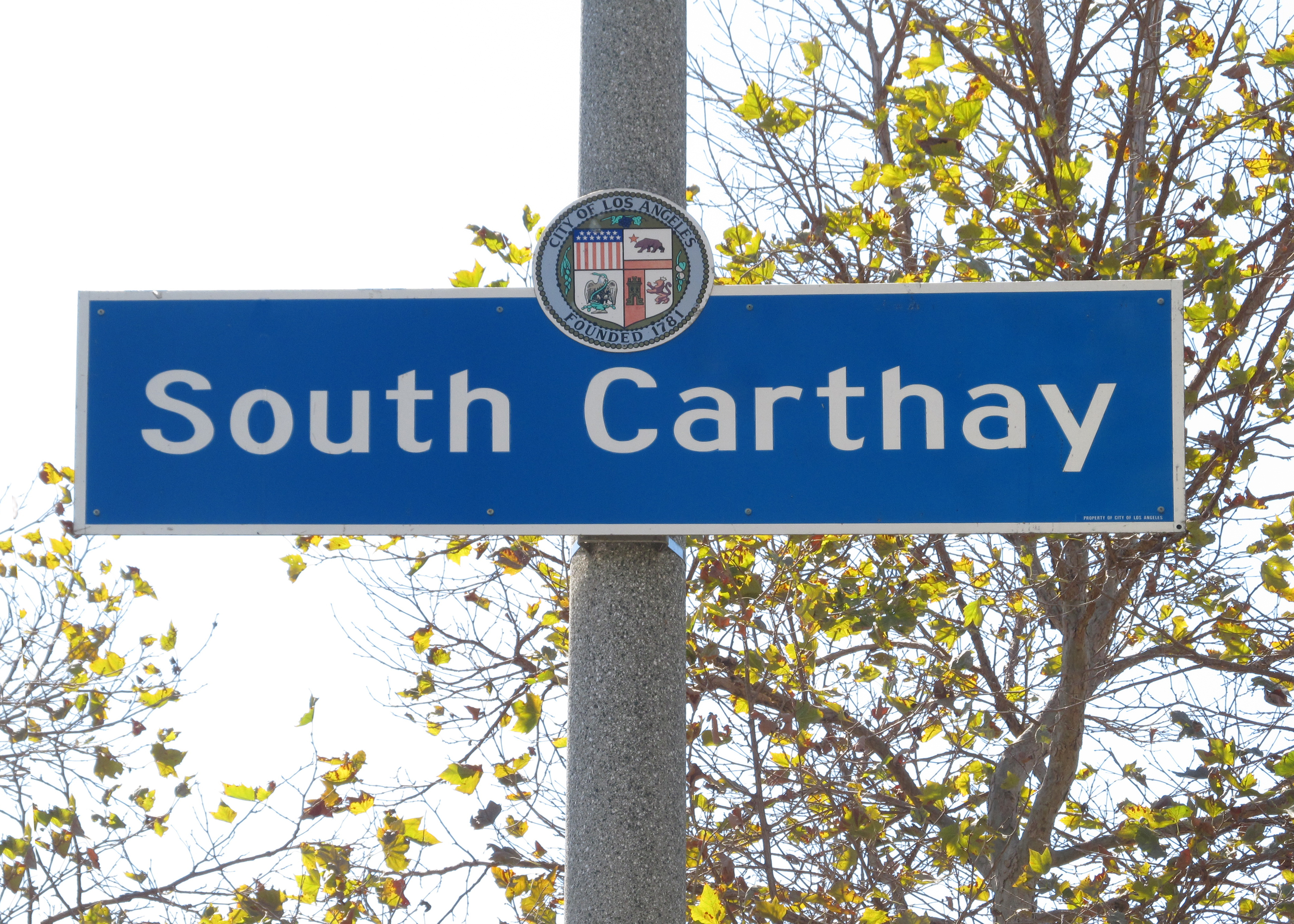
- South Carthay neighborhood sign located at 1025 S. Crescent Heights Boulevard (just south of Olympic Boulevard)

- Location within Los Angeles
- Coordinates: 34°03′41″N 118°22′11″W
- Country: United States
- State: California
- County: Los Angeles
- Time zone: Pacific
- Zip Code: 90035
- Area code: 323

South Carthay is a neighborhood in Central Los Angeles, California. Located south of Carthay Circle, South Carthay was developed in the 1930s by Spyros George Ponty.

== Geography ==
The neighborhood is bounded by Olympic Boulevard on the north, La Cienega Boulevard on the west, Pico Boulevard on the south, and Crescent Heights Boulevard on the east. The neighborhood of Carthay Circle is to the north.

== History ==
The South Carthay area became a portion of the City of Los Angeles on February 28, 1922. Residential development in the area began during the early 1930s on land that previously grew produce for Ralphs markets. Greek developer Spyros George Ponty worked with architect Alan Ruoff to design 147 modest Mediterranean-style homes in the area. While the builder's influence is found in Westwood, Norwalk, Beverly Hills, South-Central Los Angeles and the San Fernando Valley, South Carthay's Spanish Colonial Revival homes represents one of his earliest legacies. All of the 147 homes designed by Ponty share red-tiled roofs and stucco exterior walls, wrought iron and glazed-tile detailing. Yet each home was built slightly differently from the next, with flipped floor plans and doors and windows in different places. South Carthay remains an architecturally cohesive community, with few intrusions from the succeeding decades.

== Historic Preservation Overlay Zone ==
In 1984, South Carthay became the second neighborhood in the city to receive the designation of Historic Preservation Overlay Zone (HPOZ). The South Carthay preservation plan was adopted by the City of Los Angeles on December 9, 2010. Objectives of the HPOZ include: Safeguarding the character of historic buildings and protecting the historic streetscape . The HPOZ boundaries exclude the commercial thoroughfares of Pico Boulevard and La Cienega Boulevard.
