= Central Los Angeles =

Region of Los Angeles County, California

- Region of Los Angeles

- Location within Southern Los Angeles
- Country: United States
- State: California
- County: Los Angeles
- City: Los Angeles

Area
  - Total: 57.87 sq mi (149.9 km^{2})

Population (2020)
  - Total: 832,614
  - Density: 14,390/sq mi (5,555/km^{2})

Central Los Angeles is the historical urban region of the city of Los Angeles, containing downtown Los Angeles, and several nearby regions in southwest Los Angeles County, California.

== Geographic designation by The City of Los Angeles ==
The Los Angeles Department of City Planning divides the city into Area Planning Commission (APC) areas, each further divided into Community Plan areas (CPAs).

The Central Los Angeles APC area is made up of the following six CPAs:

- Central City CPA
- Central City North CPA
- Hollywood CPA
- Westlake CPA
- Wilshire CPA

Each CPA is divided by neighborhood council, though a neighborhood council can cover an area in more than one CPA. Neighborhoods within each CPA include the following:

Central City CPA

- Bunker Hill
- Central City East
- Civic Center
- Convention Center district
- El Pueblo district
- Fashion District
- Historic Core
- Little Tokyo
- South Park
- Warehouse District

Central City North CPA

- Chinatown
- Little Tokyo (partly)
- Arts District
- Warehouse District

Wilshire CPA

- Wilshire Center
- Koreatown
- Hancock Park
- Windsor Square
- Larchmont
- Mid-Wilshire
- Mid-City
- Beverly–Fairfax
- Carthay
- Pico–Robertson (partly)

Hollywood CPA

- Bird Streets
- Beachwood Canyon
- East Hollywood
- Hollywood
- Hollywood Hills
- Laurel Canyon (partly)
- Little Armenia
- Los Feliz
- Thai Town

Westlake CPA

- Westlake
- Historic Filipinotown
- Temple–Beaudry

== Geographic designation by Mapping L.A. Project ==
According to the Mapping L.A. survey of the Los Angeles Times, the Central Los Angeles region constitutes 57.87 sq mi (149.9 km^{2}) and comprises twenty-three neighborhoods within the City of Los Angeles, as well as Griffith Park, the city's largest public park. In Mapping L.A., the Central Los Angeles region consists of:

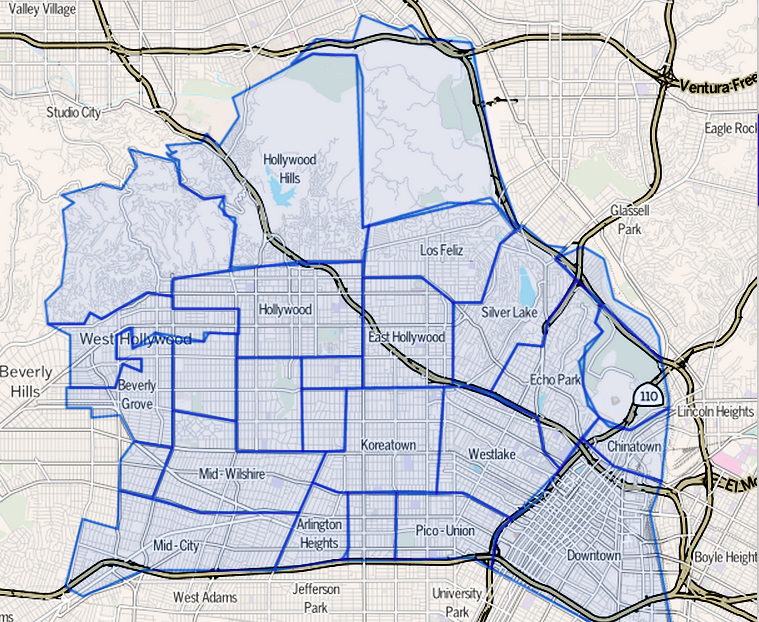
Central Los Angeles as mapped by the Los Angeles Times

- Arlington Heights
- Beverly Grove
- Carthay
- Chinatown
- Downtown
- East Hollywood
- Echo Park
- Elysian Park
- Elysian Valley
- Faircrest Heights
- Griffith Park
- Hancock Park
- Harvard Heights
- Hollywood
- Hollywood Hills
- Hollywood Hills West
- Koreatown
- Larchmont
- Los Feliz
- Mid-City
- Mid-Wilshire
- Pico-Union
- Silver Lake
- West Hollywood
- Westlake
- Windsor Square

== Population ==
The following data applies to Central Los Angeles within the boundaries set by Mapping L.A.:

In the 2000 United States census, Central Los Angeles had 836,638 residents in its 57.87 sq mi (149.9 km^{2}), including the uninhabited Griffith and Elysian parks, which amounted to 14,458 people per square mile. The densest neighborhood was Koreatown, and the least dense was Elysian Park. The four densest regions by population were in Central Los Angeles: Koreatown with 42,611 residents per square mile, followed by Westlake, 38,214; East Hollywood, 31,095, and Pico-Union, 25,352.

About 81% of the area's population lived in rental units, while 19% lived in owner-occupied housing. Westlake was the neighborhood with the highest rental occupancy, and Hollywood Hills West had the lowest. The latter district also had the oldest population, and Pico-Union had the youngest. Hollywood Hills West also was the wealthiest neighborhood, and Downtown was the poorest. Hollywood Hills West was the neighborhood with the largest percentage of residents holding a four-year academic degree, and Pico-Union had the lowest percentage. The ethnic breakdown in 2000 was Latino 46.1%; white 26.4%, Asian 16.2%; black 8.2%, and other 3.1%. Mid-Wilshire was the most ethnically diverse neighborhood and Pico-Union the least.

== See also ==
Other regions of Los Angeles County

- Angeles National Forest
- Antelope Valley
- Eastside
- Harbor
- Northeast Los Angeles
- Northwest County
- Pomona Valley
- San Fernando Valley
- San Gabriel Valley
- South Bay
- Santa Monica Mountains
- South Los Angeles
- Southeast County
- Verdugos
- Westside
