= Los Angeles Historic Preservation Overlay Zone =

Historic area of Los Angeles, California, US

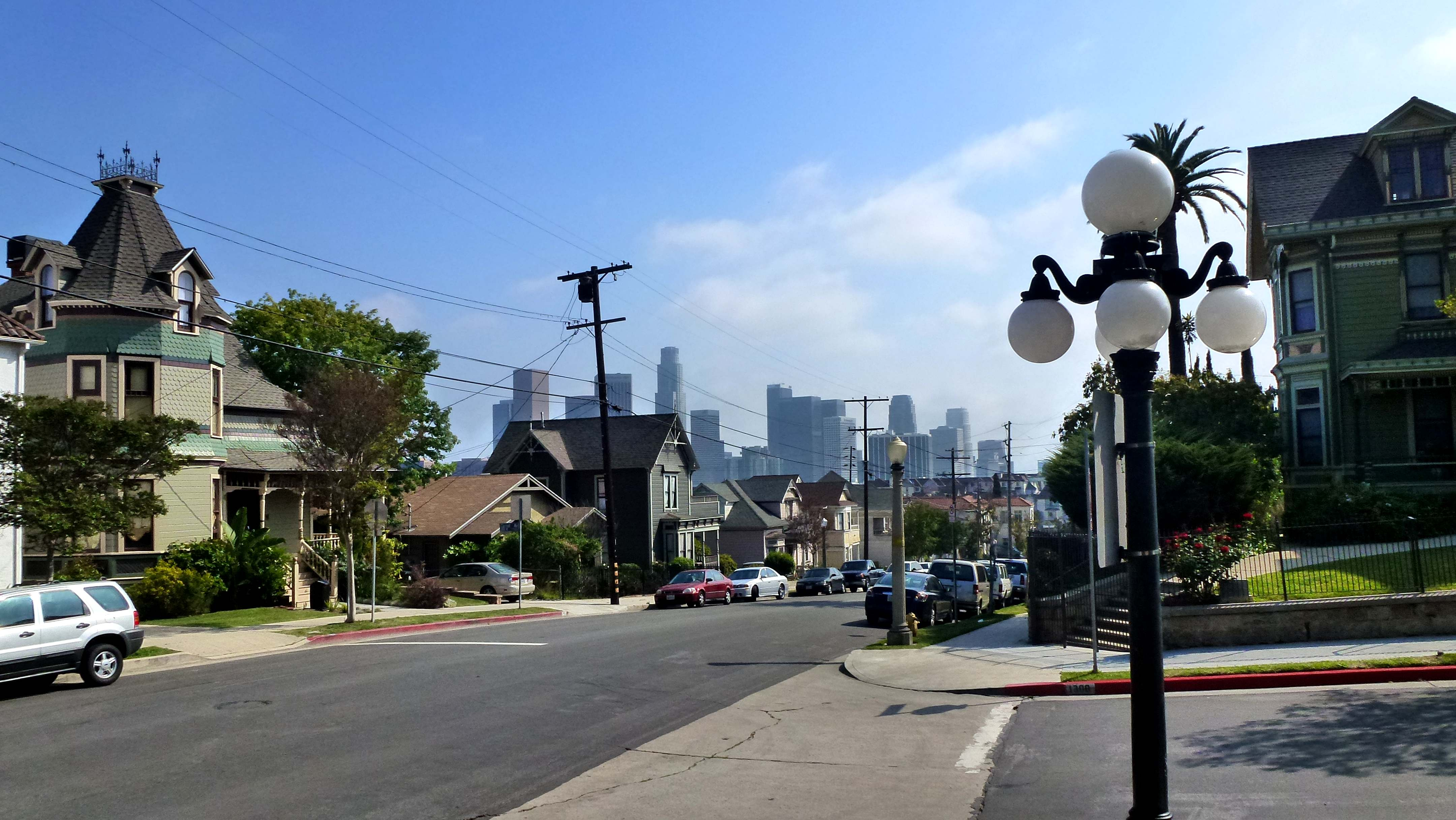
Carroll Avenue in Angelino Heights, the neighborhood designated as the first Historic Preservation Overlay Zone in 1983

A Historic Preservation Overlay Zone is a designation that the city of Los Angeles uses as a zoning tool to protect and preserve neighborhoods with architectural and historical significance.

== History ==
In 1978, the city of Los Angeles held a public hearing to amend the municipal code to allow for Historic Preservation Overlay Zones. The city recognized the importance of preserving the architectural and cultural legacy of its neighborhoods and in 1979 it adopted the HPOZ Ordinance. This paved the way for the designation of historic districts. The Los Angeles Conservancy worked with local officials to develop the ordinance.

In 1983, Angelino Heights became the first HPOZ. Two years later, South Carthay became the second HPOZ neighborhood.

In 1986, a property owner in Angelino Heights was stopped from replacing large original windows with smaller aluminum windows and stuccoing over the exterior of a home within the HPOZ. The problem originated due to a city clerk not recognizing the HPOZ designation and not properly informing the property owner.

In 1986, the Los Angeles Conservancy sponsored an HPOZ workshop including speakers from the Wilton Place Historic District and the South Carthay HPOZ.

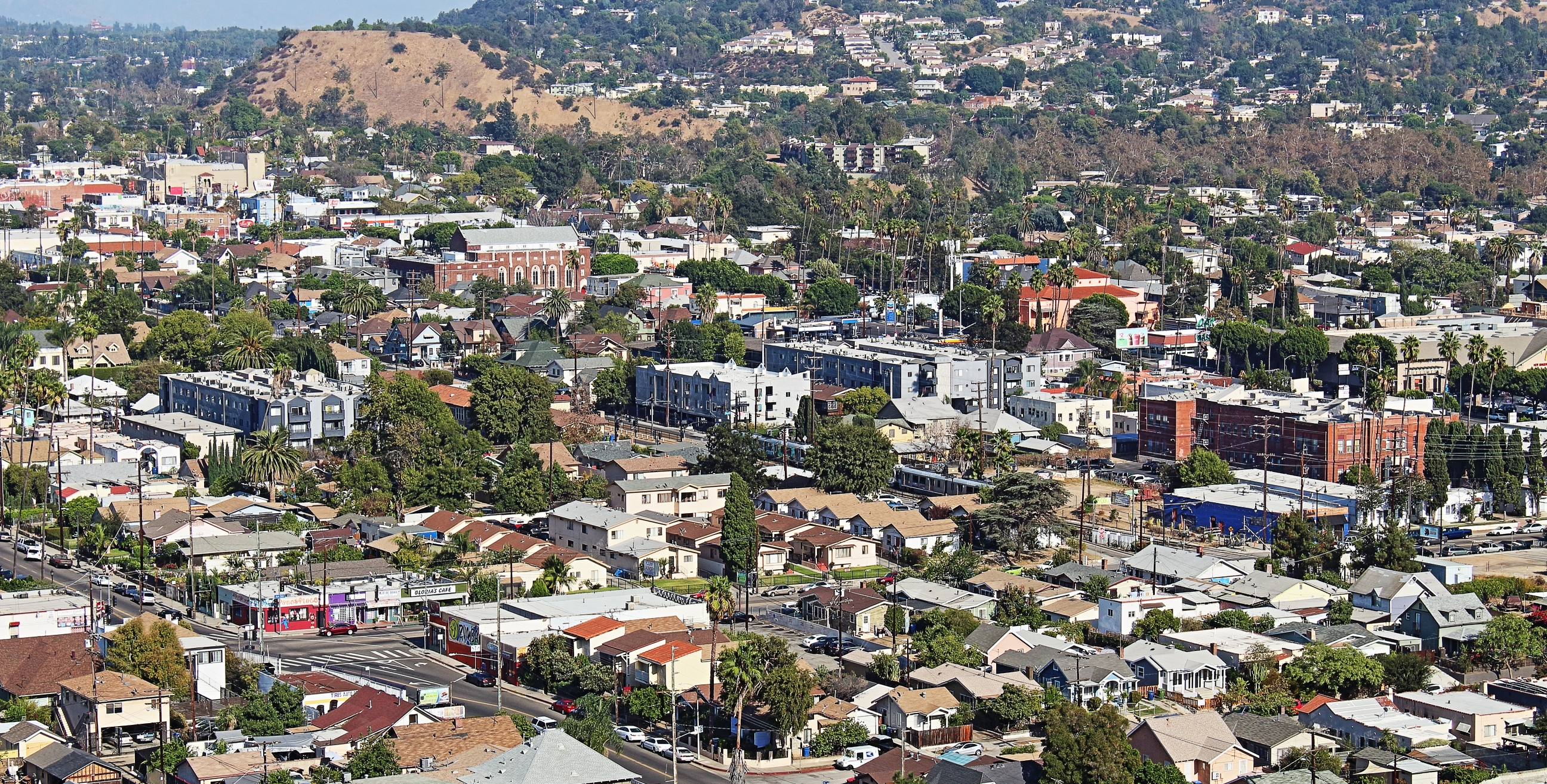
Aerial view of Highland Park, the largest HPOZ by area

In 1987, the city ruled against the Highland Park Heritage Trust as well as local residents to allow for the demolition of two Craftsman homes in Highland Park. At that time, residents stated that the defeat taught them how to organize and how to develop the skills to achieve HPOZ designation. In 1992, Highland Park became the sixth, and the largest, HPOZ in the city. The HPOZ covers most of Highland Park along with portions of Mount Washington and Montecito Heights and includes 1500 structures deemed to have historic value.

By 2001, the city had established 22 HPOZs, including Vinegar Hill, which was the city's smallest HPOZ. Although the original Vinegar Hill neighborhood was much larger, the HPOZ is a little more than one block - the south side of ninth street and both sides of tenth street.

Discussion about forming an HPOZ in Van Nuys started in 2001. In 2005, a section of Van Nuys became the first HPOZ in the San Fernando Valley.

In 2011, a home designed by Paul Revere Williams located in the Miracle Mile North HPOZ was badly damaged during a residential fire. Since it was a contributing structure to the HPOZ, the homeowner was encouraged by the Office of City Planning to seek out an architect who understood Williams' work before beginning repairs.

In 2011, the Los Angeles Conservancy sponsored a tour of homes in three different HPOZ neighborhoods: Country Club Park, Windsor Village and Wilshire Park.

In 2017, the Los Angeles Times published guidelines on "common ways you might be ruining" your home. Critiquing what the Times called the "flipster crowd" (hipsters who flip houses), the Times specifically cited HPOZ guidelines and advised repairing historic doors and keeping original windows (rather than replacing with vinyl).

By 2023, the city had 35 HPOZ neighborhoods.

== Purpose ==
Each district develops a "Preservation Plan" with design guidelines and elects an HPOZ Board that reviews proposed work within the boundaries of the HPOZ. Exterior work within the HPOZ, including landscaping, alterations, additions, and new construction, is subject to review. Some projects are reviewed at a staff level, while others also go to the neighborhood’s HPOZ Board for review. The goal is protect the distinctive architectural and cultural resources in each neighborhood. This also means that new projects in that neighborhood must complement its historic architectural character.

There are several steps to designate a neighborhood an HPOZ.

- Prepare both an historic context statement (this outlines the historic, architectural, and cultural significance of the neighborhood) and a neighborhood survey (this indicates both the contributing and non-contributing structures). Contributing structures date to the period of significance of the neighborhood. They do not feature major alterations that compromise the historic integrity. Non-contributing structures have been heavily altered and/or constructed outside the period of significance.
- After the survey, residents work with the city's Office of Historic Resources and develop their own preservation plan. (Each HPOZ has its own unique and distinct plan.) The plan states design guidelines and treatment for both contributing and non-contributing structures. The Cultural Heritage Commission, City Planning Commission, and Planning and Land Use Management Committee review the survey and plan before the full City Council formally adopts the HPOZ.
- After designation as an official HPOZ, a five-member board is appointed to administer the neighborhood's preservation plan in conjunction with the Department of City Planning.

== List of HPOZs ==
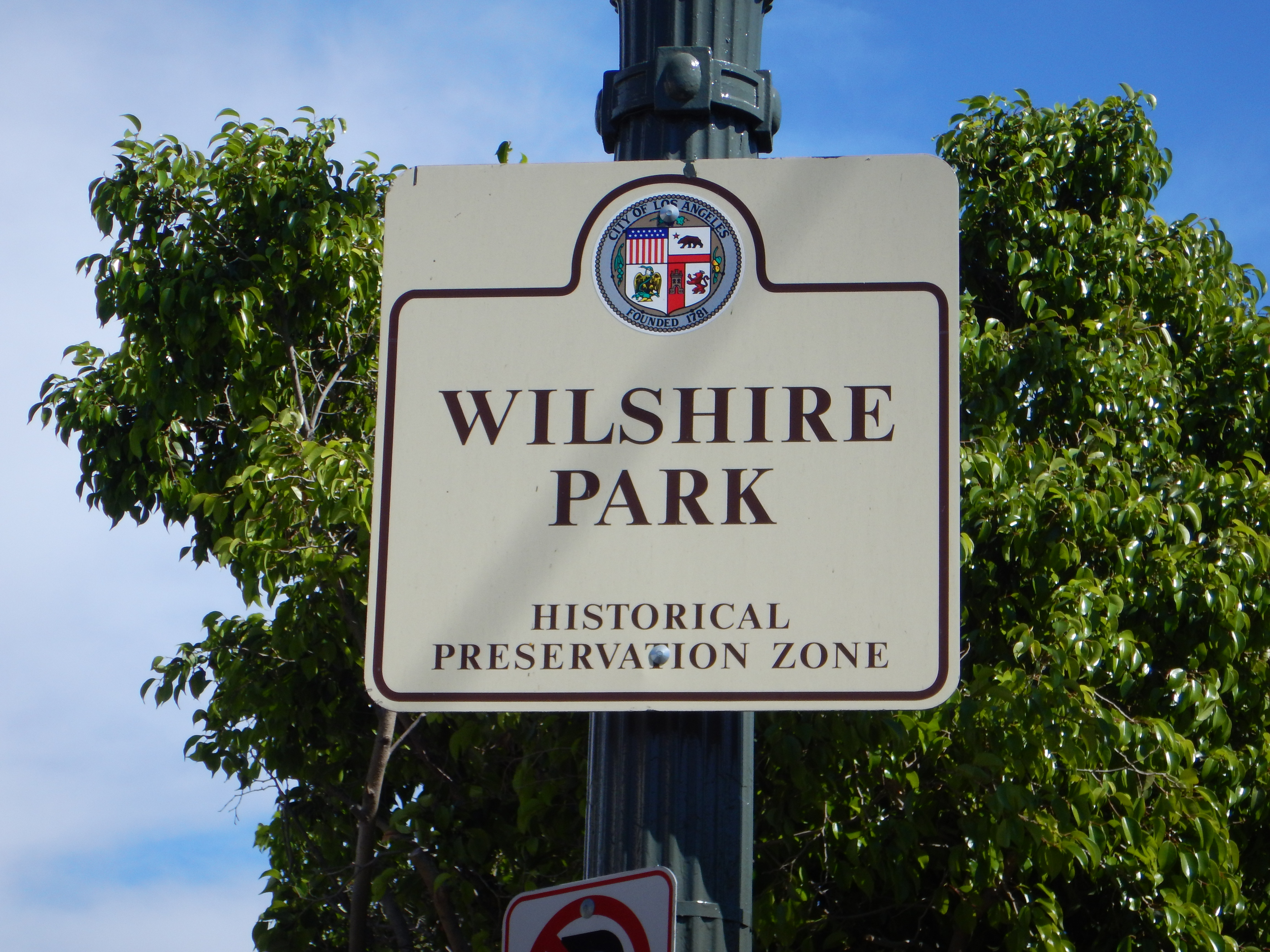
Wilshire Park HPOZ sign

The current HPOZs in Los Angeles include the following neighborhoods:

- 52nd Place
- Adams-Normandie
- Angelino Heights
- Balboa Highlands
- Banning Park
- Carthay Circle
- Carthay Square
- Country Club Park
- El Sereno - Berkshire
- Gregory Ain Mar Vista Tract
- Hancock Park
- Harvard Heights
- Highland Park
- Garvanza
- Hollywood Grove
- Jefferson Park
- Lafayette Square
- Lincoln Heights
- Melrose Hill
- Miracle Mile
- Miracle Mile North
- Oxford Square
- North University Park
- Pico - Union
- South Carthay
- Spaulding Square
- Stonehurst
- Sunset Square
- University Park
- Van Nuys
- Vinegar Hill
- West Adams Terrace
- Western Heights
- Whitley Heights
- Wilshire Park
- Windsor Square
- Windsor Village

The city also publishes an interactive map showing the locations of each HPOZ
