= Los Angeles Neighborhood Signs =

Identifiers of geographic neighborhood boundaries

The City of Los Angeles posts neighborhood signs to identify the geographic boundaries of different neighborhoods.

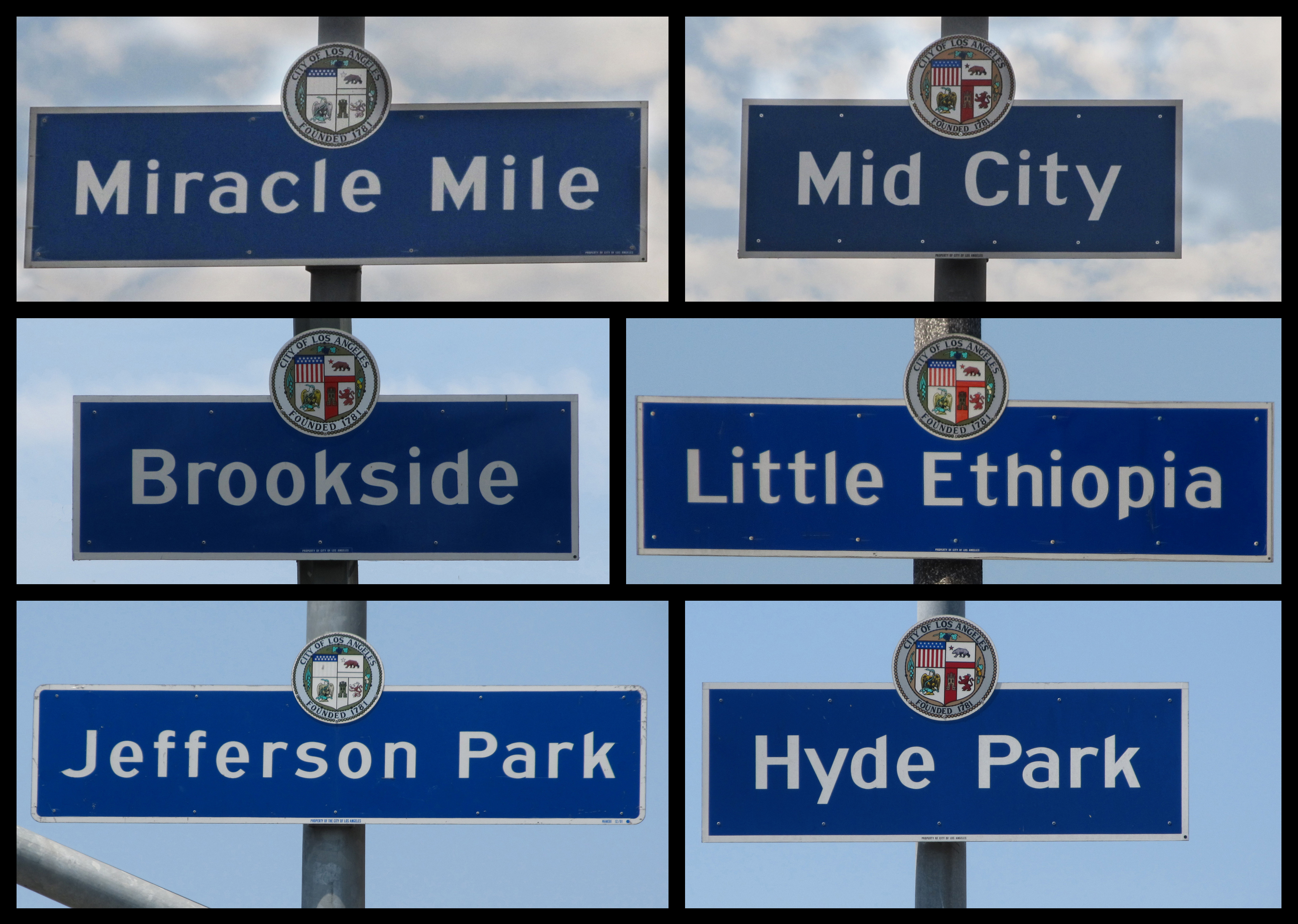
Los Angeles Neighborhood Signs

LAist stated that these signs indicate “official L.A. neighborhood” designation and in 2008 estimated that Los Angeles had 185 neighborhoods with an official "blue sign.”

The process of securing a neighborhood sign – from application to installation – takes between 12 and 18 months.

== Design ==
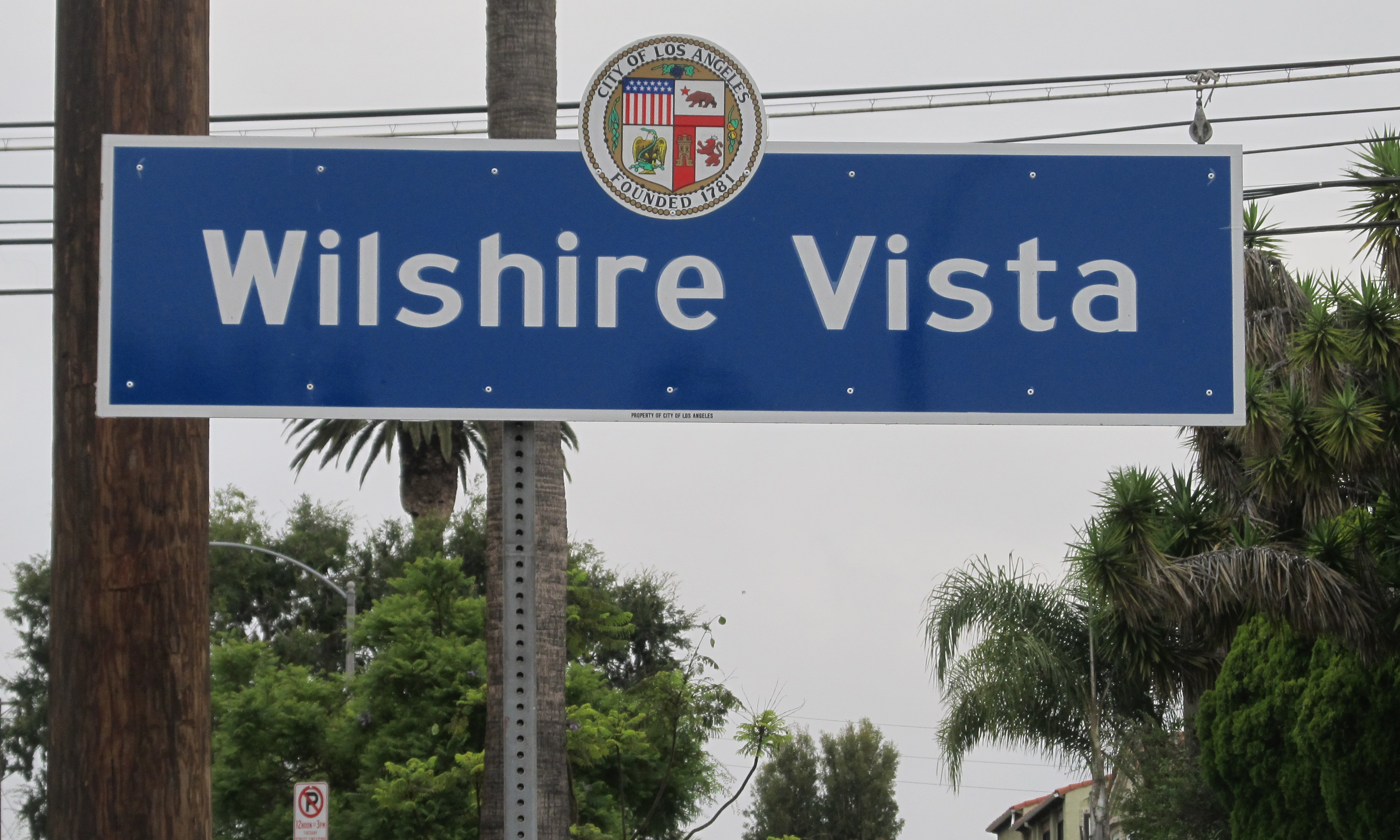
Wilshire Vista Neighborhood Sign

The standard neighborhood sign is rectangular and features white letters on a blue background. The city seal is displayed on the sign.

Alternative colors and shapes are possible upon request provided they comply with federal and state law. Example: octagonal signs painted red are reserved for stop signs.

== Process ==
The Los Angeles City Council adopted a policy on January 31, 2006 (Council File No. 02-0196), which provided a process to either change a neighborhood name or create one where none previously existed. A written application, including a petition, must be filed with the City Clerk to initiate the process. The application must have 500 signatures or, if the population of the neighborhood is less than 2,500 residents, then the petition should contain signatures from 20% of the population. A legal description (street boundaries) of the area must also be included. A map of the proposed area must be also attached. After concurrence from the local councilmember's office, the neighborhood signs are then posted by the Los Angeles Department of Transportation (LADOT).

== Timeframe ==
Examples cited in local papers indicate that the beginning-to-end process (application to installation) takes twelve to eighteen months:

- Residents of Reseda Ranch submitted their application to the city on January 17, 2007. It was approved on December 7, 2007. The neighborhood sign was installed in August 2008.
- Neighborhood leaders in Little Bangladesh organized residents for more than a year to lobby the Los Angeles City Council. The designation was approved in 2010 and neighborhood signs were installed in 2011.
- After spending eight months collecting signatures, community leaders in West Los Angeles submitted an application change the official name of their neighborhood to Sawtelle Japantown on December 1, 2014. On February 25, 2015, the City Council unanimously approved the neighborhood designation. The sign was installed on the corner of Olympic and Sawtelle Boulevards on March 29, 2015.

== Other types of signage ==
In addition to the blue neighborhood signs, the city also offers signage for neighborhoods of historical significance and places of cultural significance (designated as such by a federal or state agency or by resolution of the City Council).

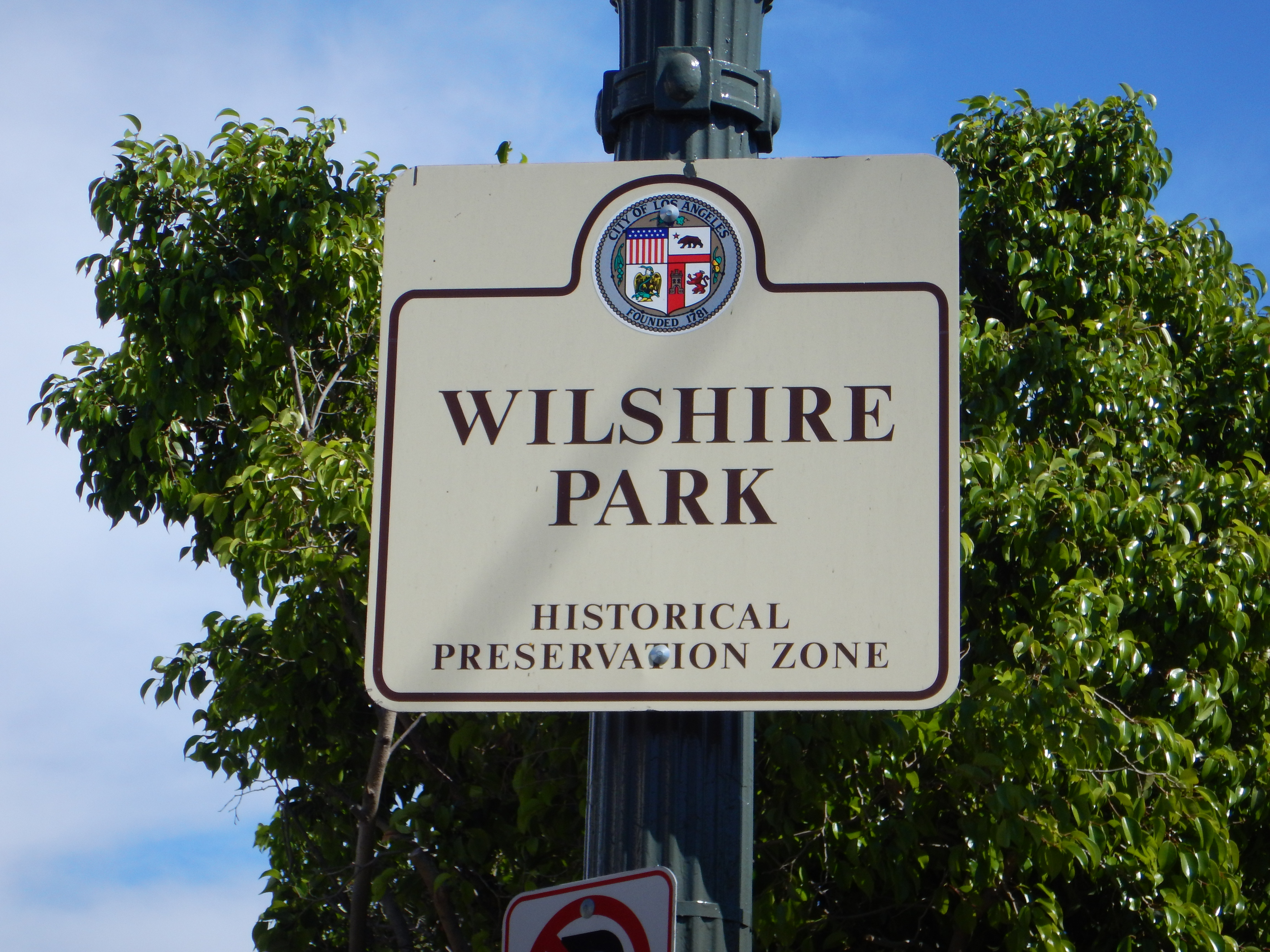
Wilshire Park Los Angeles Historic Preservation Overlay Zone sign

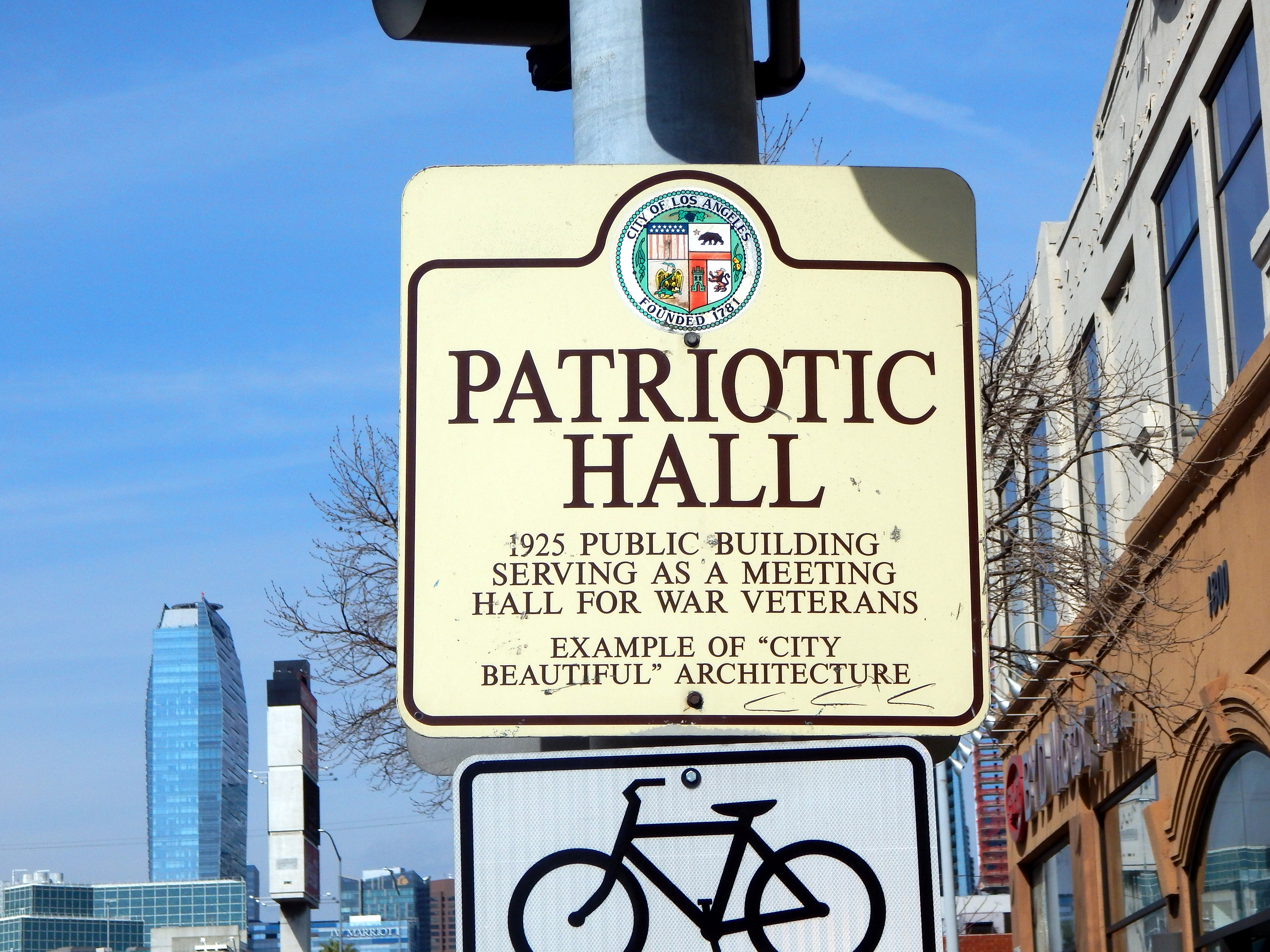
Patriotic Hall sign explaining the building's significance
