= Mapping L.A. =

Los Angeles Times mapping project

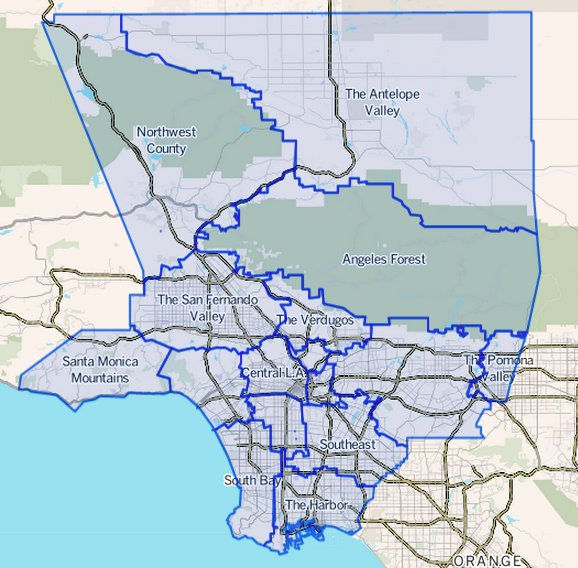
Mapping L.A. boundaries of the Los Angeles Times

Mapping L.A. was a 2009 project of the Los Angeles Times. The goal of The mapping project was to draw boundary lines for 114 neighborhoods within the City of Los Angeles along with and 42 unincorporated areas.

Upon presentation, it was noted by various publications that the mapping project ignored city-recognized neighborhood boundaries and it lumped smaller neighborhoods into larger, more indistinct areas.

== History ==
The project began in February 2009 with the posting online of the first version of boundary lines for 87 Los Angeles neighborhoods. The map was then redrawn with the help of readers who agreed or disagreed with the initial boundaries. The Times said: "After reviewing this collective knowledge, Times staffers adjusted more than 100 boundaries, eliminated some names and added others."

== Sources ==
The Times' database editor and the map project's coordinator, Doug Smith, along with researcher Maloy Moore, standardized the neighborhood boundaries "based on historical and anecdotal definitions, civic proclamations and reader commentary." "Thousands of city blocks" were converted "into a complete picture of Los Angeles neighborhoods, with no ambiguities, overlaps or missing pieces."

== Scope and limitations ==
The Times said that the Mapping L.A. project became the newspaper's "resource for neighborhood boundaries, demographics, crime and schools." The results as posted are searchable by address and ZIP code or by individual neighborhood. It noted that:

The maps cover the 4,000 square miles [10,500 km^{2}] of Los Angeles County — by far the most populous county in the nation — from the high desert to the coast. In 2009, there were an estimated 9.8 million residents, up from 9.5 million counted in the 2000 U.S. census, the basis for The Times' demographic analysis for each neighborhood and region. Unlike most other attempts at mapping L.A., this one follows a set of principles intended to make it visually and statistically coherent. It gathers every block of the city into reasonably compact areas leaving no enclaves, gaps, overhangs or ambiguities.

The project crafted neighborhood boundaries by merging together neighboring census tracts. However, census tract boundaries are not always consistent with traditional neighborhood boundaries. As the Times states:

Census tracts are drawn by the U.S. Census Bureau and used for tabulating demographic information, including income and ethnicity. The shapes of the tracts are frequently out of sync with the geographical, historic and socioeconomic associations that define communities. However, by using the tracts as building blocks, The Times was able to compile a statistical profile of communities, something other neighborhood boundaries do not offer.

The Times further stated that after merging tracts, they then adjusted the boundary lines by moving individual city blocks from one census tract to another. That allowed them to adjust the census data in proportion to the relocated block's population. A first draft of 87 neighborhoods was released in February 2009. As the Times received input from their readers, they shifted where the neighborhood boundaries should be nearly 100 times. A final map of 114 neighborhoods was released in June 2009. With the release of the maps, the Times stated:

We'll be the first to acknowledge that our map isn't perfect. No lines can capture the geographic diversity and demographic energy of Los Angeles.

== Objections ==
Not everyone agreed with the neighborhood boundaries the Times ultimately settled on. Elizabeth Fuller wrote in The Larchmont Buzz that "Many people who live in and represent their neighborhoods in various ways have objected to the Times’ designations for not following city-recognized borders, and for lumping many smaller neighborhoods into larger, more indistinct areas such as “Mid-Wilshire.”

In 2017, cartographer Eric Brightwell of Pendersleigh and Sons created a map that identified 472 neighborhoods (in comparison to Mapping LA's 114 neighborhoods).

Comparing Brightwell's map with the Mapping LA Project, Jenna Chandler, the editor of Curbed Los Angeles, wrote that Brightwell's map of 472 neighborhoods "looks more accurate than the neighborhood maps compiled by the Los Angeles Times." Additionally, Elizabeth Fuller of The Larchmont Buzz said that Brightwell's map was a much more fine-grained view of “every L.A. neighborhood.”

LAist reporter Tim Loc said that while Mapping L.A. provided "plenty of insightful information about individual neighborhoods...Brightwell takes it to the next level when it comes to breaking down the territories." Of Brightwell's map, Loc noted that Downtown L.A. is parsed out as the Historic Core, Bunker Hill, Skid Row, and Gallery Row among others. Brightwell notes that in the Mapping L.A. Project, Downtown L.A. is just "downtown L.A. and Chinatown; there's no Jewelry District or any of the others."

Historian Greg Fischer also dissented. Since the late 1980s, Fisher had been instrumental in the city's effort to install official neighborhood signs. Fisher cited The Times omission of Little Tokyo from their map. “If Chinatown is there, Little Tokyo would certainly seem to have a place,” Fisher noted.

== See also ==
- List of districts and neighborhoods of Los Angeles

== Other reading ==
- Nita Lelyveld, "His L.A. Map Quest: A small-town boy smitten with the city's vastness hand-draws quirky depictions of its neighborhoods," Los Angeles Times, June 14, 2012, image 17. Article with some of Eric Brightwell's maps.
