= List of Ethiopian Americans =

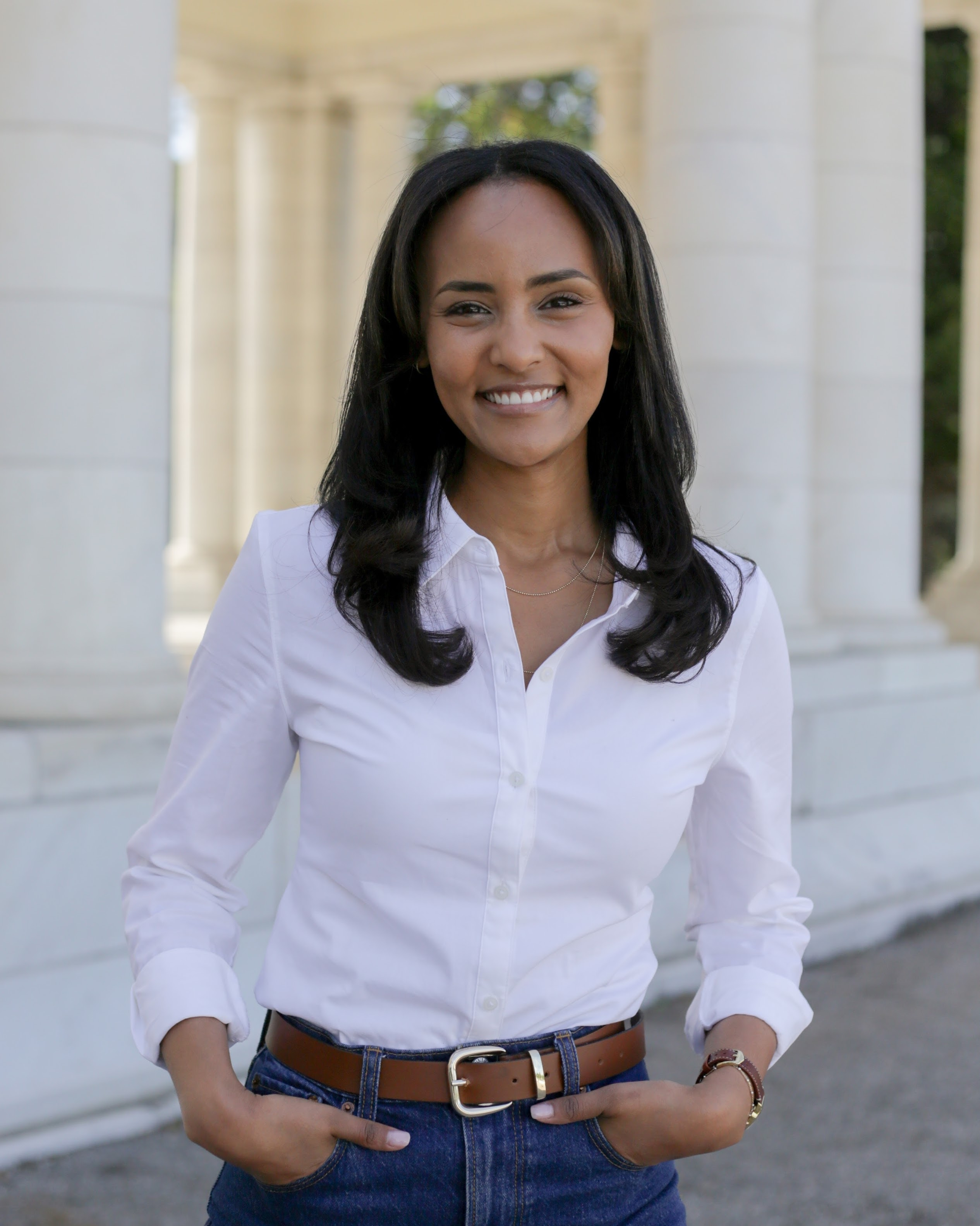
Melat Kiros (pictured) along with Ilhan Omar, are the first Horner American women elected to the U.S. Congress

This is a list of notable Ethiopian Americans, including both immigrants from Ethiopia who obtained American nationality and their American descendants.

To be included in this list, the person must have a Wikipedia article showing that they are Ethiopian American or must have independent references showing that they are Ethiopian American and are notable.

== List ==
- Abdul "Duke" Fakir – singer
- Abdus Ibrahim – soccer player
- Alexander Assefa – former Nevada State Representative
- Aminé – rapper/singer-songwriter
- Amsale Aberra – fashion designer
- Aster Aweke – singer
- Daniel Yohannes – former U.S. Ambassador to the OECD
- Dereje Agonafer – professor of mechanical engineering, National Academy of Engineering Fellow
- Dinaw Mengestu – author
- Electron Kebebew – Chief Surgeon, Stanford University – Department of Surgery
- Felonious Munk – comedian/actor/writer
- Fershgenet Melaku – model and rapper
- Gabriel Teodros – hip hop artist
- Gebisa Ejeta – geneticist and recipient of the 2009 World Food Prize
- Gigi – singer
- Girmay Zahilay – politician
- Gonjasufi – musician
- Haile Gerima – filmmaker
- Honey Mahogany – activist, politician, drag performer, and singer
- Ilfenesh Hadera – actress
- Imani – rapper
- Jelani Nelson – professor of electrical engineering and computer science
- Jordan Dangerfield – NFL safety for the Pittsburgh Steelers
- Julie Mehretu – painter
- Kelela – singer-songwriter
- Kenna Zemedkun – rock singer
- Liya Kebede – international supermodel
- Mazi Melesa Pilip – Ethiopian-born American politician
- Melat Kiros — Ethiopian-born American graduate student, politician
- Metasebia Yoseph – Ethiopian American author
- Mulatu Astatke – musician and arranger, father of Ethio-Jazz
- Naomi Girma – soccer player
- Nnegest Likké – film director/screenwriter
- Robel Teklemariam – cross country skier
- Selamawi Asgedom – author
- Sossina M. Haile – scientist, professor
- Teshome Gabriel – cinema scholar and professor
- Walidah Imarisha – writer/activist/educator and spoken word artist
- Wayna – singer
- Yared Nuguse – middle distance runner
- Y-Love – rapper
- Yohannes Sahle – soccer manager

== See also ==
- Ethiopian Americans
- Ethiopians in Washington, D.C.
- List of Ethiopians
