= Little Ethiopia =

Little Ethiopia may refer to:

- Little Ethiopia, Los Angeles, a neighborhood in Los Angeles, California, United States, known for its collection of Ethiopian American and Eritrean American community establishments
- Little Ethiopia, Baltimore, a community in Baltimore, Maryland, United States, with a concentrated population of Ethiopian Americans
- Little Ethiopia (Washington, D.C.), a sub-division of the Shaw neighborhood in Washington, District of Columbia, United States
