= Picfair Village, Los Angeles =

Picfair Village
- Neighborhood of Los Angeles
- Location within Los Angeles
- Coordinates: 34°03′03″N 118°21′56″W
- Country: United States of America
- State: California
- County: Los Angeles
- Time zone: Pacific
- Zip Code: 90019
- Area code: 323

Picfair Village is a neighborhood in the Central area of the city of Los Angeles, California.

== Geography ==
Picfair Village's boundaries are Pico Boulevard on the north, Hauser Boulevard on the east, Venice Boulevard on the south, and Fairfax Avenue on the west. Wilshire Vista lies to the north, as does the Miracle Mile. Little Ethiopia lies to the northwest and Faircrest Heights is to the west.

== History ==
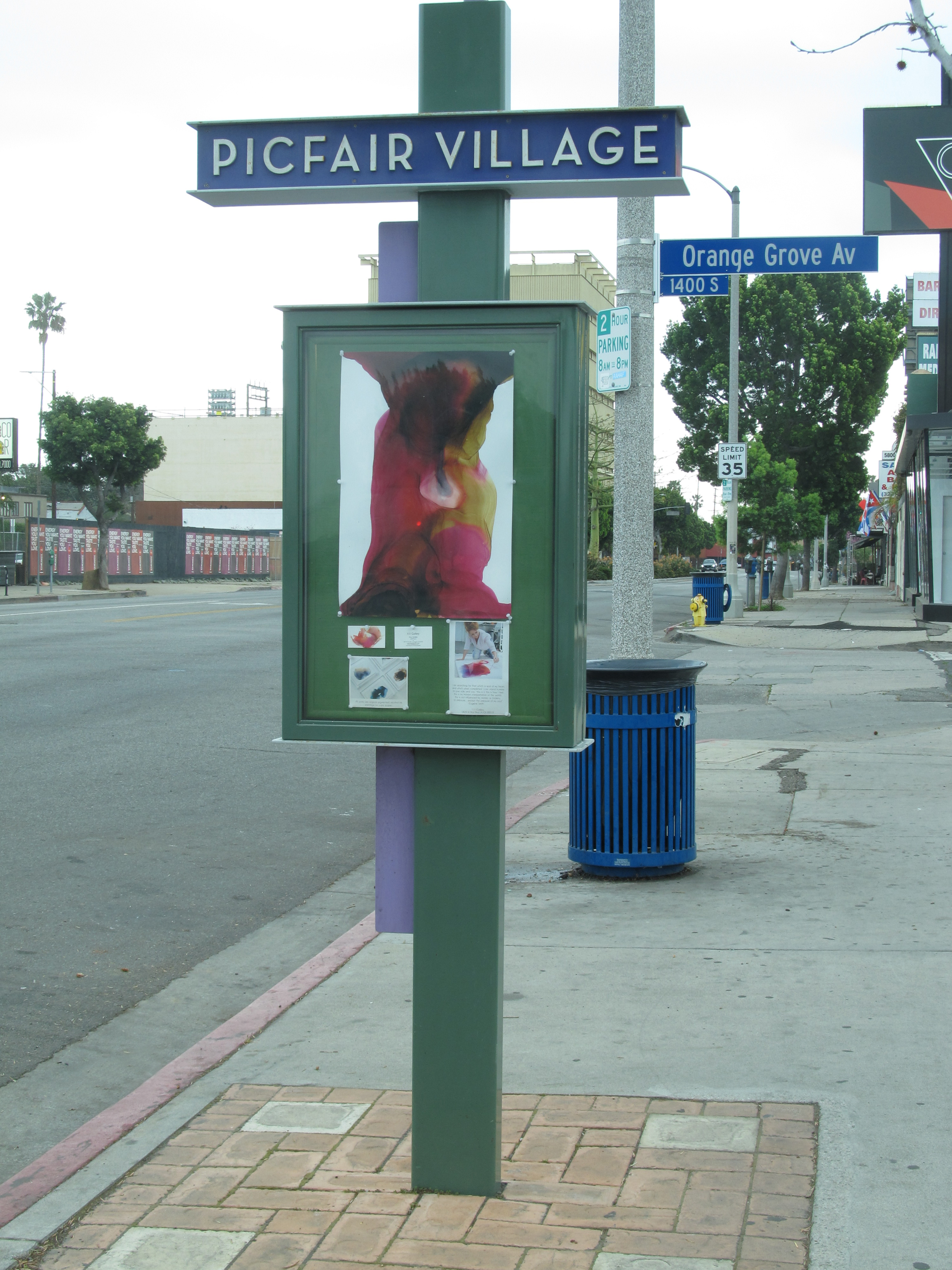
Pickfair Village Signage at Pico Boulevard and Orange Grove Avenue

Picfair Village takes its name from the Picfair movie theatre that stood at the corner of Pico and Fairfax until the early 1980s.

Initially hailed as "the New Wilshire...[and] a delightful place for a home," what is now Picfair Village was part of the Santa Monica Land and Water Co.'s 1922 development called Pico Boulevard Heights. They offered "choice lots on Genesee Street" starting at $1,250.

On Pico, a few blocks east of Fairfax, a street mural by Los Angeles artist Retna can be seen. It is noted for its portrait of a chicana with a combination of script-like symbols in the background.

The area was once home to crime fiction author Walter Mosley (one of his characters lived on Stanley). The neighborhood has been active since 1998 and has a Picfair Village Neighborhood Association.

The neighborhood was once home to the historic Picfair Theater, which opened in 1941 but was burnt down during the 1992 LA riots.

In November 2004, Picfair Village was named as one of Los Angeles magazine's "10 Most Overlooked Neighborhoods in Los Angeles." In January 2007, the Los Angeles Times said Picfair Village is "on its way to becoming L.A.'s next trendy place to live and play."

Picfair Village is part of the P.I.C.O. Neighborhood Council.

== Neighborhood composition ==
The housing stock is predominantly Spanish Colonial and Art Deco one- and two-family homes (the neighborhood is zoned R-1 and R-2), with some multi-unit dwellings (mostly north of Saturn Street). The latter tend to be Mid-Century architecture.

The main street of the "Village" is Pico Boulevard between Fairfax and Hauser, and is dotted to with cafes, restaurants and boutiques.

The area south of Pico and north of Saturn Street has a mix of houses and two- to four-plexes. South of Pickford are mostly single family residential homes. Homes on the north–south streets tend to be full-size lots (5,000 - 6000 sq. ft.), while homes on the east–west streets tend to be bungalow (smaller) sized lots.
