= Felonious Munk =

Ethiopian-American comedian (born 1972)

- Born: August 4, 1972 (age 54)
- Spouse: Lontier Hicks (m. 2015)
- Children: 3

Comedy career
- Medium: Stand up; sketch comedy

Arif Bilal Shahid (born August 4, 1972), known professionally as Felonious Munk, is an Ethiopian-American comedian, writer, actor, playwright, and social commentator. He is best known as Hassan on the ABC show For Life.

== Career ==
After leaving a job as a finance director for a car dealership, Munk pursued stand up comedy. Shortly after, he began a web series, Stop It B. The series eventually gained attention in the political world for Munk's socio-political commentary. Following several appearances on Fox Business News' Imus in the Morning in 2011, Munk was hired by WPIX in New York to provide commentary for their 5pm news broadcast, anchored by Jodi Applegate. He was also a regular in the comedy clubs in the city, headlining Gotham in 2012/13 and making appearances on podcasts like Robert Kelly's You Know What Dude! podcast, among others.

In 2012, former Tribune Company chief innovation officer Lee Abrams founded TouchVision, a news media organization targeting millennials, and hired Munk to provide the type of biting, edgy, and funny commentary he'd previously provided for WPIX. From 2013–2016 Munk and TouchVision provided Chicago and TouchVision's syndicated audience with Emmy-worthy commentary. While in Chicago, Munk has been an integral part in creating and growing the groundbreaking Afrofuturism show in concert with the legendary sketch and improv theater The Second City. That show evolved into a new show, "Black Side of the Moon", which debuted in Washington, D.C. In its 7-week run, it became the best-selling show in Woolly Mammoth Theater history. During the run of the show, Munk debuted his impression of President Obama, with The Washington Post's reviewer calling it "measured and spot-on". He has also appeared as part of the Chicago-based Simmer Brown collective of South Asian comedians.

Munk began appearing on The Nightly Show with Larry Wilmore in its first season and made several appearances as the "Blegghead" (Black Egghead) over the shows two seasons. Munk starred for two seasons as Hassan Nawaz on the show For Life on ABC, and made an appearance as "The Laughter" on the South Side episode of the same name.

=== Activism ===
While still living in New York, Munk was in the midst of the Trayvon Martin protests. His experiences began to influence his commentary as he became more outspoken about social issues as opposed to his previous focus on governmental politics. In August 2014, he traveled from Chicago to Ferguson, MO after Johnetta Elzie reached out to him via Twitter regarding the shooting of Mike Brown. Ferguson had a profound effect on his comedy and his commentary and he began speaking at colleges about what he learned.

== Personal life ==
On July 18, 2015 he married Lontier Hicks, a former accountant from Oak Park, IL. They live in Oak Park, a suburb of Chicago. He has one daughter from a previous marriage. On August 12, 2016, he and his wife welcomed their first son together.
