= Picfair Theater =

Film house in Los Angeles, California, United States (1941–1979)

- Interactive map of Picfair Theater
- Address: 5879 W. Pico Boulevard; Los Angeles; United States
- Coordinates: 34.051°N 118.367°W
- Operator: Joseph Moritz, James H. Nicholson (1941-1968); Loews Cineplex Entertainment (1968-1979)

Construction
- Opened: January 24, 1941
- Closed: September 5, 1983
- Demolished: 1992
- Builder: Joe DeBell

The Picfair Theater was a neighborhood film house in the West Los Angeles neighborhood of Picfair, on West Pico Boulevard at Fairfax Avenue.

It opened on January 24, 1941, and was leased and operated by Joseph Moritz and James H. Nicholson in the 1940s. It was part of a four-theater booking combination called the "Academy of Proven Hits," which showed reissued double-bill features, often Academy Award winners. Nicholson managed the theater before he launched his American Releasing Corporation, which later became American International Pictures. The theater was built by general contractor Joe DeBell, and had a soundproof "crying room", where mothers could take their noisy children and watch the movie without disturbing other patrons. The theater was remodeled in 1968 after the Loews chain purchased it and financed the upgrade valued at $100,000.

The theater closed on September 5, 1983, and an appliance store opened in the space thereafter. The art deco building was destroyed in the Los Angeles riots of 1992.
