= Ethiopian Americans =

Americans of Ethiopian birth or descent

ኢትዮጵያውያን አሜሪካውያን (Amharic)

Total population
- 372,804 (Ethiopian–ancestry) (2023); 278,182 (Ethiopia-born) (2023); 1,000 Ethiopian Israelis resident or citizens in the US.

Regions with significant populations
- Los Angeles; Washington, D.C.; San Diego; San Francisco; New York City; Philadelphia; Boston; Minneapolis-St. Paul; Seattle; Denver; Cleveland; Indianapolis; Chicago; Milwaukee; Atlanta; Miami; Dallas; Columbus; Houston; Detroit; Baltimore; Las Vegas; Idaho; Oregon

Languages
- Afar; Amharic; Oromo; Tigrinya; American English; Modern Hebrew

Religion
- Christianity (Ethiopian Orthodox · Ethiopian Catholic · P'ent'ay); Islam; Judaism

Related ethnic groups
- Eritrean Americans, Somali Americans, Sudanese Americans

Ethiopian Americans are Americans of Ethiopian descent, as well as individuals of American and Ethiopian ancestry. The largest Ethiopian American community is in the Washington, D.C. metropolitan area, with some estimates claiming a population of over 200,000 in the area; other large Ethiopian communities are found in Minneapolis–Saint Paul, Dallas-Fort Worth metroplex, Las Vegas, Seattle–Tacoma–Bellevue, Denver, the San Francisco Bay Area, Los Angeles, Salt Lake City, Columbus, and South Dakota.

== History ==
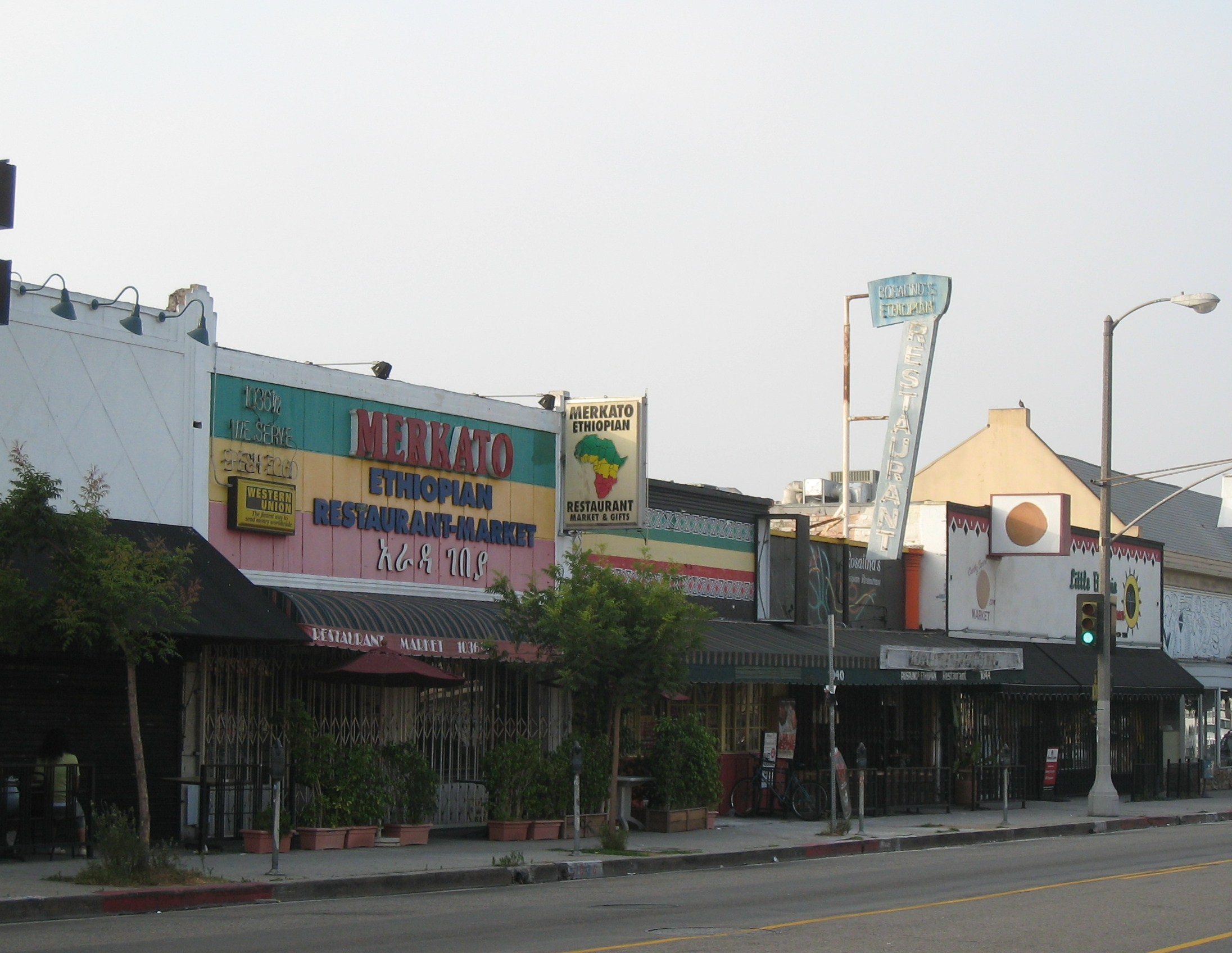
Ethiopian businesses along Fairfax Avenue in Little Ethiopia, Los Angeles.

In 1919, an official Ethiopian goodwill mission was sent to the United States to congratulate the Allied powers on their victory during the First World War. The four-person delegation included Dejazmach Nadew, the nephew of Empress Zawditu and Commander of the Imperial Army, along with Blattengeta Heruy Welde Sellase, Mayor of Addis Ababa, Kentiba Gebru, Mayor of Gondar, and Ato Sinkas, Dejazmach Nadew's secretary.

After his official coronation, Emperor Haile Selassie sent forth the first wave of Ethiopian students to continue their education abroad. Almost a dozen Ethiopian students likewise went to the United States. They included Makonnen Desta, who studied anthropology at Harvard, and later became an interim Ethiopian Minister of Education; Makonnen Haile, who studied finance at Cornell; and Ingida Yohannes, veterinary medicine at New York University. Three other students – Melaku Beyen, Besha Worrid Hapte Wold, and Worku Gobena – went to Muskingum, a missionary college in Ohio, two of them later transferring to the Ohio State University. Melaku Beyan, who was one of the two who attended Ohio State, later received his medical degree at Howard Medical School in Washington, D.C.

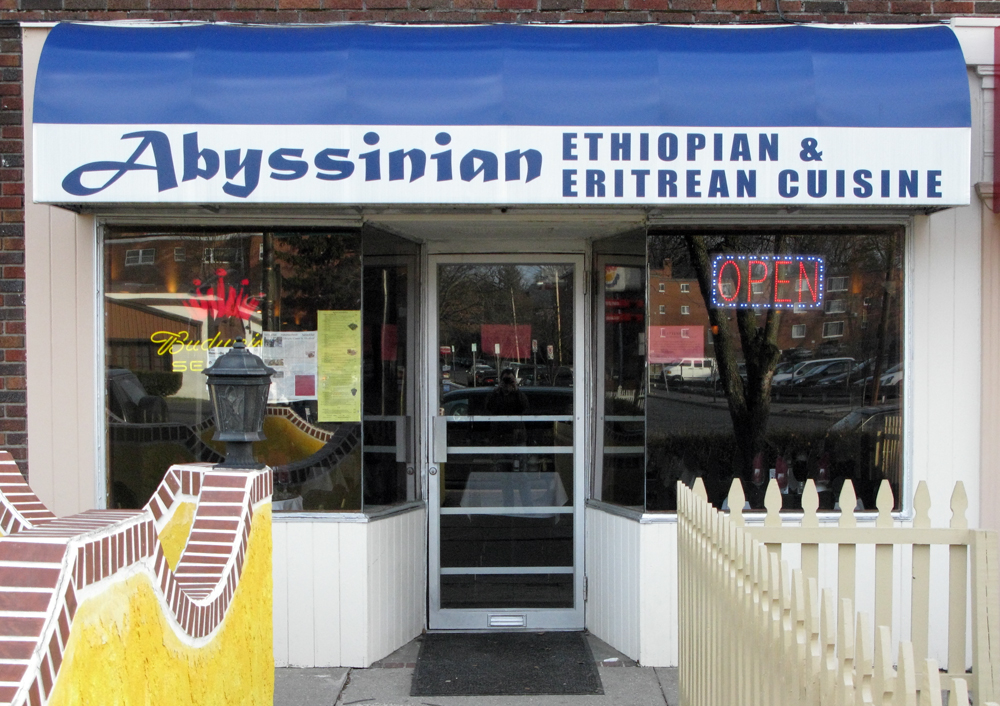
An Ethiopian restaurant in Hartford, Connecticut.

Overall, approximately 20,000 Ethiopians moved to the West to achieve higher education and conduct diplomatic missions from 1941 to 1974 under the Selassie's rule. However, the net movement of permanent immigrants remained low during this period as most temporary immigrants ultimately returned to Ethiopia with a Western education to near assured political success, while the relative stability of the country determined that few Ethiopians would be granted asylum in the United States.

The passing of the 1965 Immigration Act, the Refugee Act of 1980, as well as the Diversity Visa Program of the Immigration Act of 1990, contributed to an increased emigration from Ethiopia to the United States, prompted by political unrest during the Ethiopian Civil War. The majority of Ethiopian immigrants arrived later in the 1990s, following the Eritrean–Ethiopian War. Immigration to the U.S. from Ethiopia during this 1992–2002 period averaged around 5,000 individuals per year.

Ethiopian Americans have since established ethnic enclaves in various places around the country, particularly in the Washington D.C., and Minneapolis–Saint Paul areas. Fairfax Avenue in Los Angeles, California, has also come to be known as Little Ethiopia, owing to its many Ethiopian businesses and restaurants, as well as a significant concentration of residents of Ethiopian and Eritrean ancestry. There is also a large Ethiopian community in the Twin Cities area of Minnesota.

=== Ethiopian Jews in the United States ===
Since the 1990s, around 1,000 Hebrew-speaking, Ethiopian Jews that had settled in Israel as Ethiopian Jews in Israel re-settled in the United States as Ethiopian Americans, with around half of the Ethiopian Jewish Israeli-American community living in New York.

== Demographics ==
According to the U.S. Census Bureau, approximately 68,001 people reported Ethiopian ancestry in 2000. Between 2007 and 2011, there were approximately 151,515 Ethiopia-born residents in the United States. According to Aaron Matteo Terrazas, a former policy analyst at the Migration Policy Institute, "if the descendants of Ethiopian-born migrants (the second generation and up) are included, the estimates range upwards of 460,000 in the United States (of which approximately 250,000 are in Washington, D.C.; 96,000 in Los Angeles; 20,000 in New York and 12,000 in Philadelphia)." Unofficial estimates suggest that the Washington, D.C., area has an Ethiopian population of 150,000 to 250,000.

The states, including Washington D.C., with the most people of Ethiopian ancestry by percentage are:

- Washington D.C. – 1.1% Ethiopian
- Maryland – 0.39% Ethiopian
- Virginia – 0.35% Ethiopian
- Minnesota – 0.34% Ethiopian
- Nevada – 0.33% Ethiopian
- Washington – 0.3% Ethiopian
- Colorado – 0.18% Ethiopian
- South Dakota – 0.18% Ethiopian
- Georgia – 0.17% Ethiopian
- California – 0.09% Ethiopian
- Oregon – 0.09% Ethiopian

Ethiopians are the second-largest immigrant group in both South Dakota and Washington, D.C.

== Culture ==
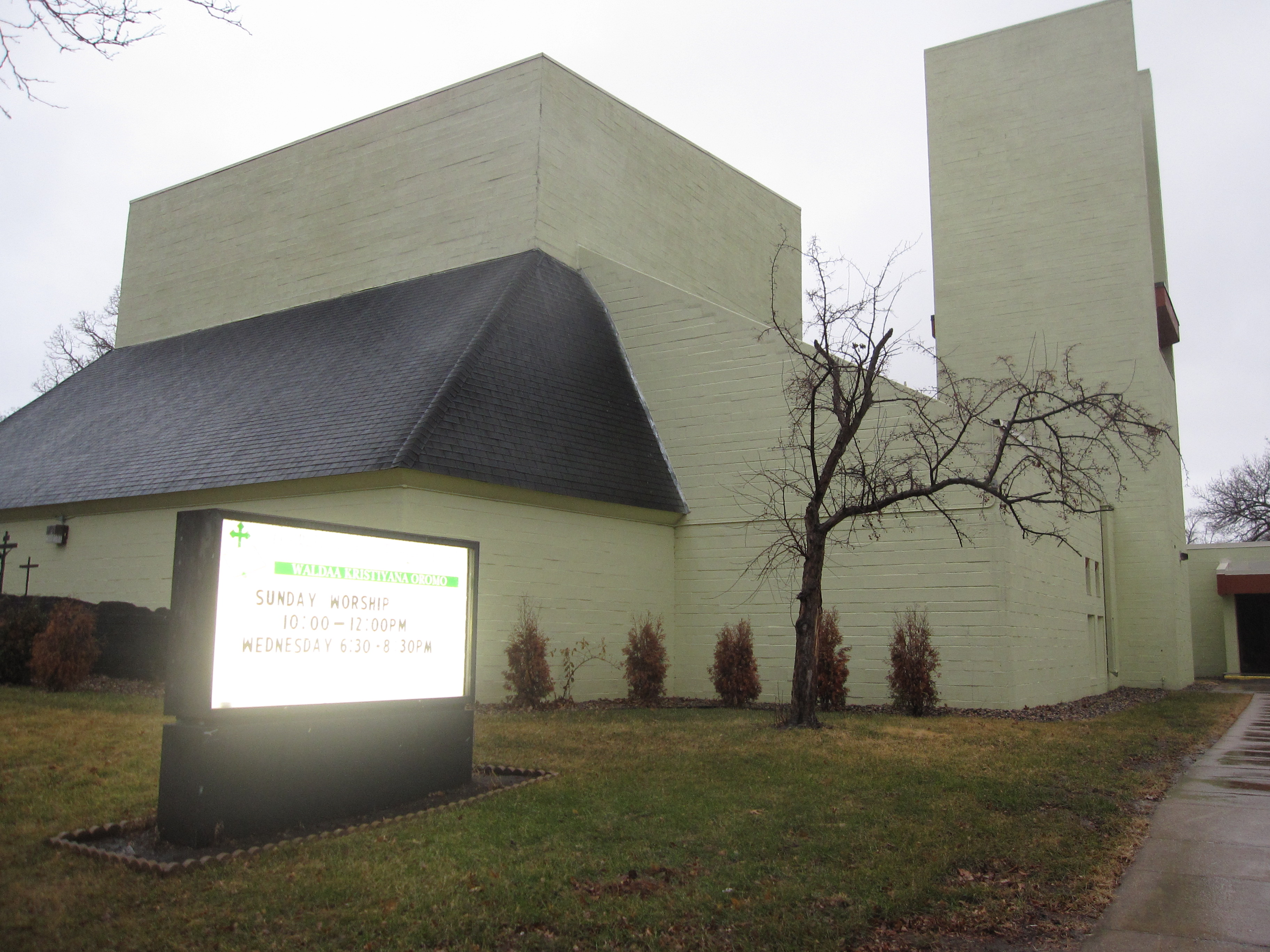
An Oromo Lutheran (P'ent'ay) church in Minneapolis.

Many Ethiopian Americans are followers of Abrahamic religions, particularly Christianity and Islam. Of these, the majority of Christians belong to the Ethiopian Orthodox Tewahedo Church. It is the largest Christian denomination in Ethiopia. Most Muslim Ethiopian expatriates adhere to the Sunni school. Other Ethiopian immigrants follow the P'ent'ay denomination of Christianity or Judaism. There has been a general religious revival among Ethiopian Americans, especially in the Orthodox sect. Church attendance in America has also increased relative to that in Ethiopia, and the institutions serve to preserve aspects of Ethiopian culture among American-born Ethiopians. They also act as networks and support systems crucial to the well-being of both recent immigrants from Ethiopia and more established Ethiopian residents. Ethiopian churches in the US are gathering places for the Ethiopian community, where Ethiopian expatriates come together to pray, socialize, stay in touch, and lend support to one another.

For many individuals living within the Ethiopian diaspora, musical performance acts as a uniting social force that allows Ethiopian immigrants in the US to explore their shared culture and identity, while simultaneously partaking in political expression and advocacy. Through public performances (e.g. cultural events on college campuses), these traditions are shown to communities of outsiders who are interested in Ethiopian music and dance within an American context. Such folkloric performances, often based in religion, feature sacred songs performed in various languages of Ethiopia, with instrumental accompaniments and traditional choreographed dances.

Ethiopian Americans frequently consume injera. This flat, mildly sour, fermented pancake is typically paired with various dishes such as wats (stews prepared with spices and meats, commonly lamb, chicken, or beef), shiro (a stew made from spices and beans, which may consist of lentils, chickpeas, or split peas), and gomen (sautéed greens, generally turnip greens, collard greens, or kale). Coffee is a favored drink among Ethiopian Americans.

== Geographic distribution ==
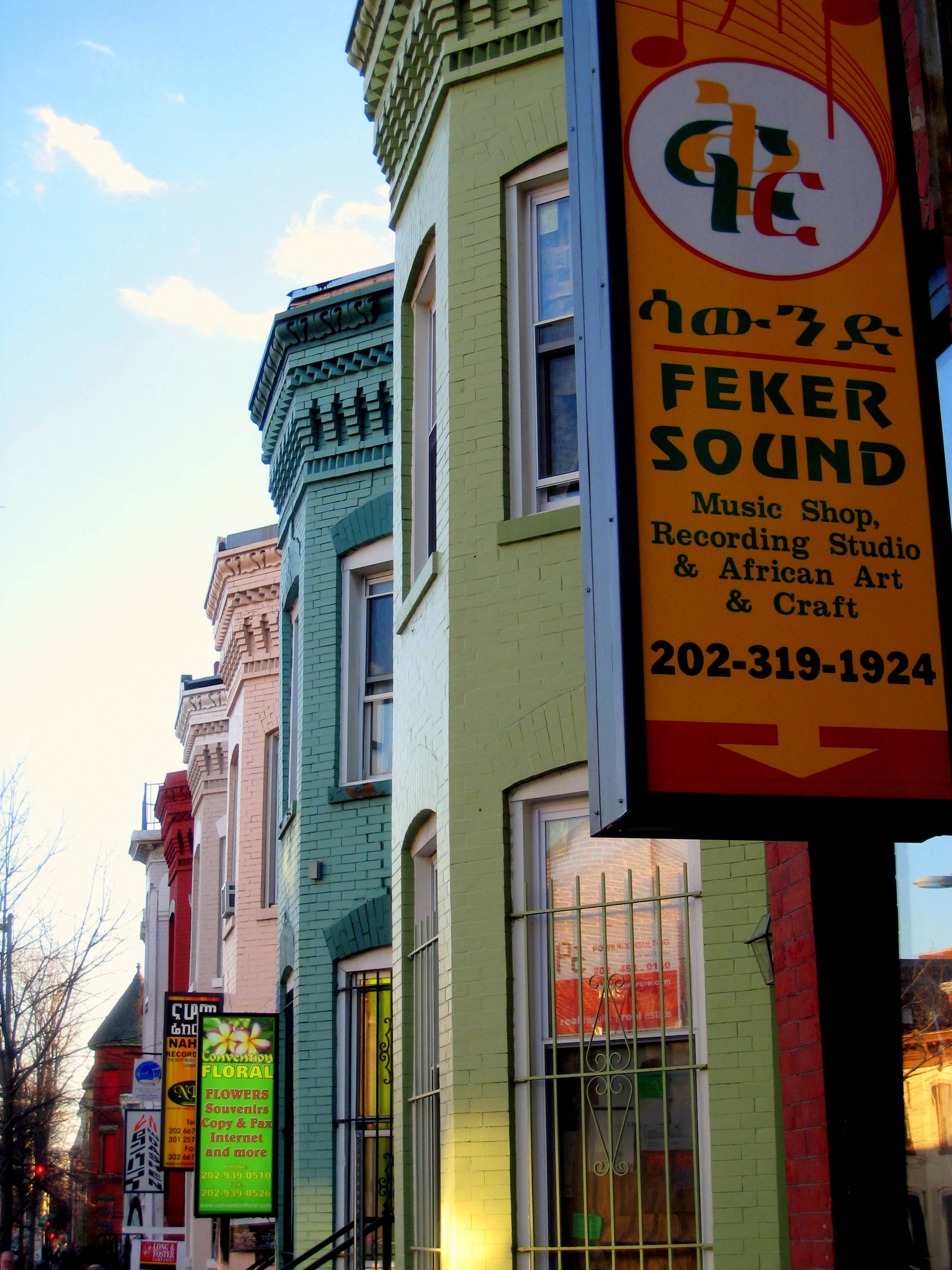
Little Ethiopia, Shaw. 9th St, NW, D.C., Washington, D.C.

=== Washington, D.C. ===
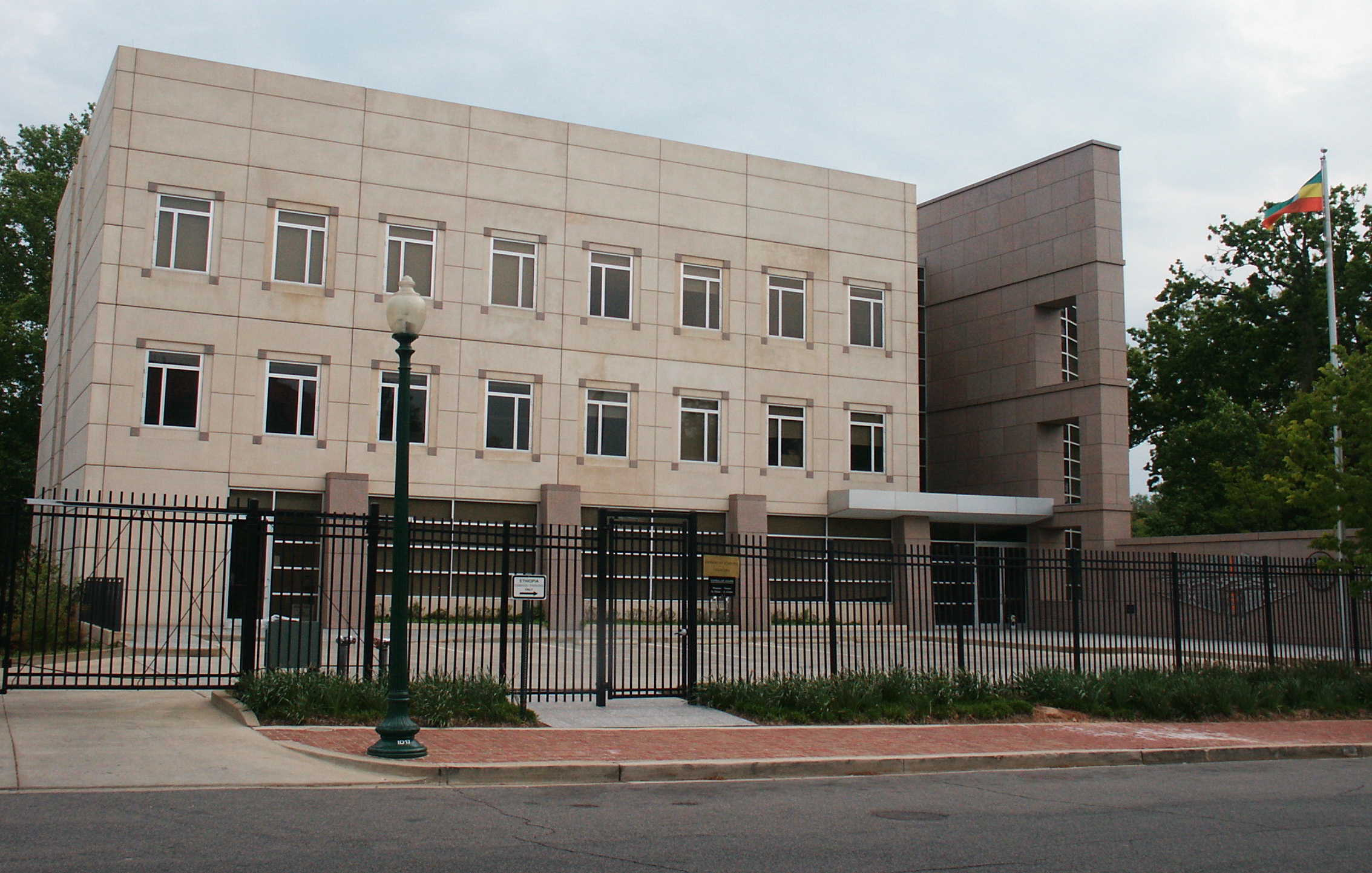
Embassy of the Federal Democratic Republic of Ethiopia in Washington, D.C.

By far, the largest concentration of Ethiopians in the United States are found in Washington, D.C. and the local metro area. Some conservative estimates put the number at around 75,000 residents, while other figures go up to 250,000. The Ethiopian Community Center was opened in 1980 to serve the area's Ethiopian residents. Ethiopian businessmen have also helped revitalize the Shaw and U Street vicinities. Although they mainly live in other parts of the capital, these entrepreneurs purchased old residential property, which they then renovated and converted into new office spaces, restaurants and cafes. Additionally, Ethiopian businessmen in the District of Columbia own various parking garages, taxi firms, social establishments, grocery stores, and travel agencies.

=== Minneapolis-Saint Paul ===
The metropolitan area with the second-highest concentration of Ethiopian Americans after Washington D.C. is the Minneapolis–Saint Paul metropolitan area of Minnesota, also known as the Twin Cities. Ethiopians have been migrating to the Twin Cities since the 1960s; however, like with Ethiopian immigration to the United States in general, immigration started accelerating in the 1980s and 1990s to the present, with both professionals and refugees and asylum seekers migrating to the state. After Somalis, Ethiopians are the second-largest immigrant population from Africa in Minnesota, and the fifth-largest immigrant population and fourth-largest country of origin of immigrants in the state.

Many Oromo immigrants came to the Twin Cities because of ties to Christian missions and social service organizations headquartered in Minnesota, like Lutheran Social Service, Lutheran World Relief, and the International Institute of Minnesota. In 1981, Oromo immigrants in St. Paul founded the Oromo Relief Association of North America (ORANA), to aid Oromos in refugee camps and to find American sponsors for Oromo immigrants. Today, ORANA continues to hold public fundraisers featuring Oromo food, cultural shows, and history.

The Ethiopian population in Minnesota is one of the most diverse, with a large representation of Amhara, Oromo, and Tigrinya Ethiopians, with Oromo being the most spoken Ethiopian language in the state. The official census shows 34,927 Ethiopian-Americans living in Minnesota, while MPR estimates that 40,000 ethnic Oromos live in the state. Ethiopians are most concentrated in Minneapolis and Saint Paul, in the areas of Phillips, Powderhorn, Near North, University, and Longfellow, alongside many Somali Americans.

=== New York City ===
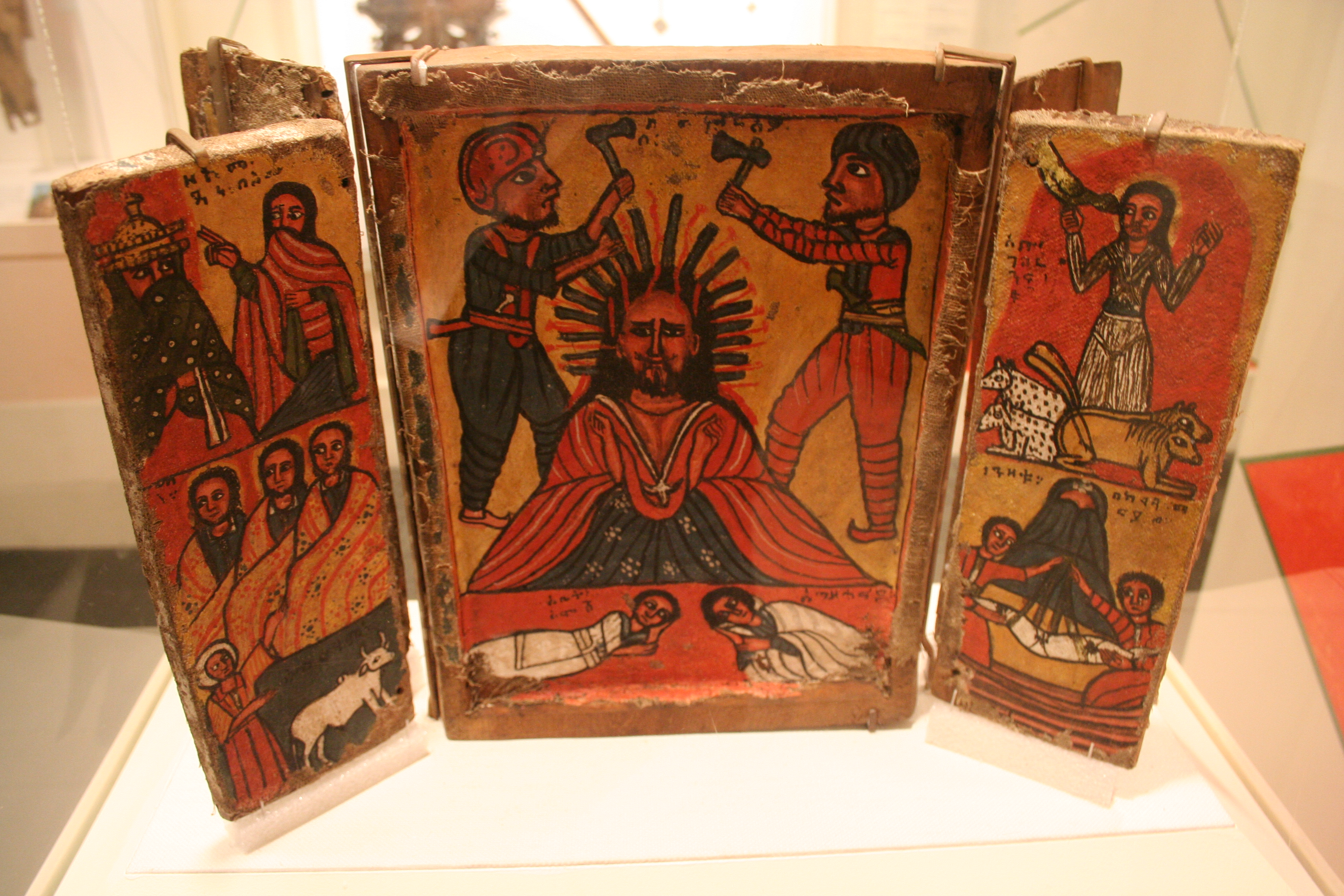
19th century Ethiopian Orthodox altar, from the Brooklyn Museum in New York.

As of 2012, there were 4,610 Ethiopia-born persons in the New York metropolitan area.

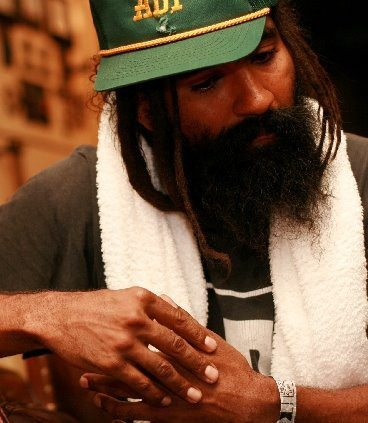
Ethiopian American musician Gonjasufi

New York Abay Ethiopian Sports Club (NYAESC), and its local football team, is located in the Bronx borough of the city. The Ethiopian football team is usually sited in Van Cortlandt Park, where some Ethiopian marathoners are also found practicing, including New York City Marathon finisher Bizunesh Deba.

=== Seattle ===
An estimated 25,000 to 40,000 Ethiopians live in Seattle, Washington, with many more living in the surrounding metropolitan area. The first Ethiopian organization in Seattle, the Ethiopian Refugee Association, was founded in 1983 and continues today under the name Ethiopian Community Mutual Association. The Seattle area is also home to three Amharic-language radio programs, as well as an Amharic newspaper and radio program. Many Ethiopians live in the neighborhoods of Rainier Beach and the Central District, and Ethiopian restaurants are a fixture of the area's cuisine.

Significant Ethiopian and Eritrean communities also exist within the Northgate area on Seattle's far north end, and a small but thriving Ethiopian/Eritrean business district has developed in Northgate's Pinehurst neighborhood.

=== Other places ===
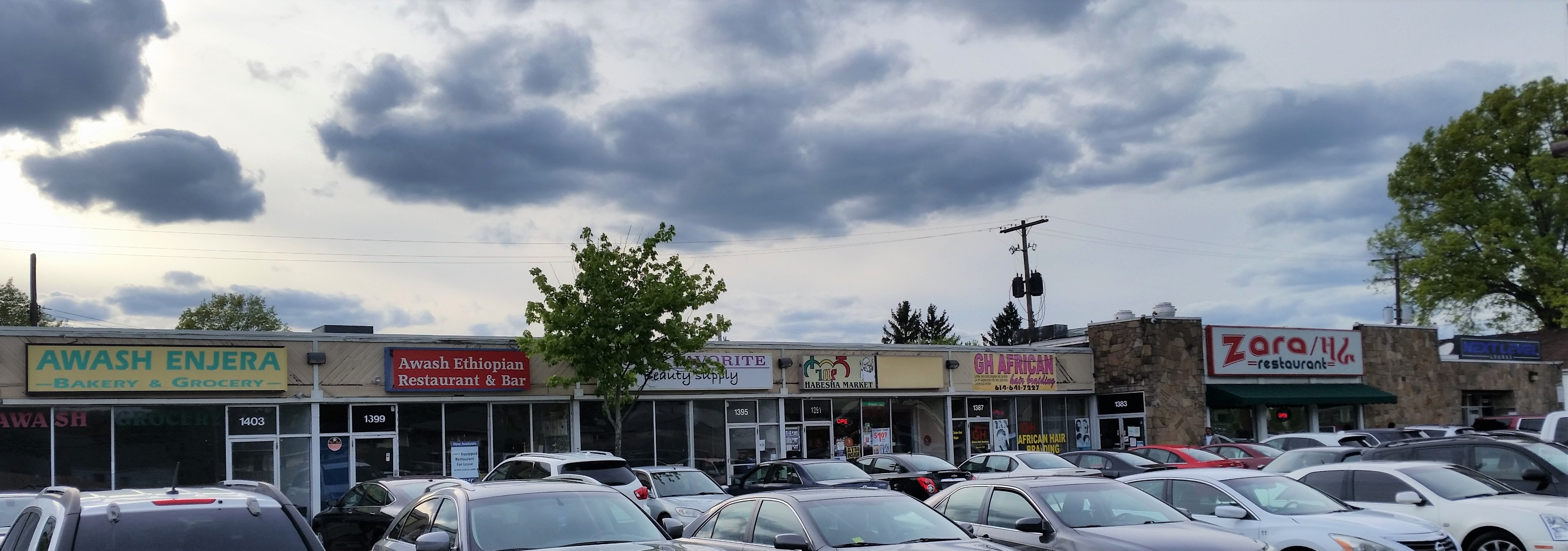
Little Ethiopia on Hamilton Road in Columbus

In 2011, around 44,600 Ethiopian residents were officially registered in the Dallas-Fort Worth metroplex. However, DFW International estimates that the Ethiopian community is much larger, with about 50,000 members.

In Ohio, there is a significant Ethiopian community in Greater Cleveland, and the Columbus metropolitan area is home to approximately 40,000 Ethiopians.

There is an Ethiopian community in Las Vegas. Around 40,000 Ethiopians live in Clark County, Nevada.

=== Migration impact ===
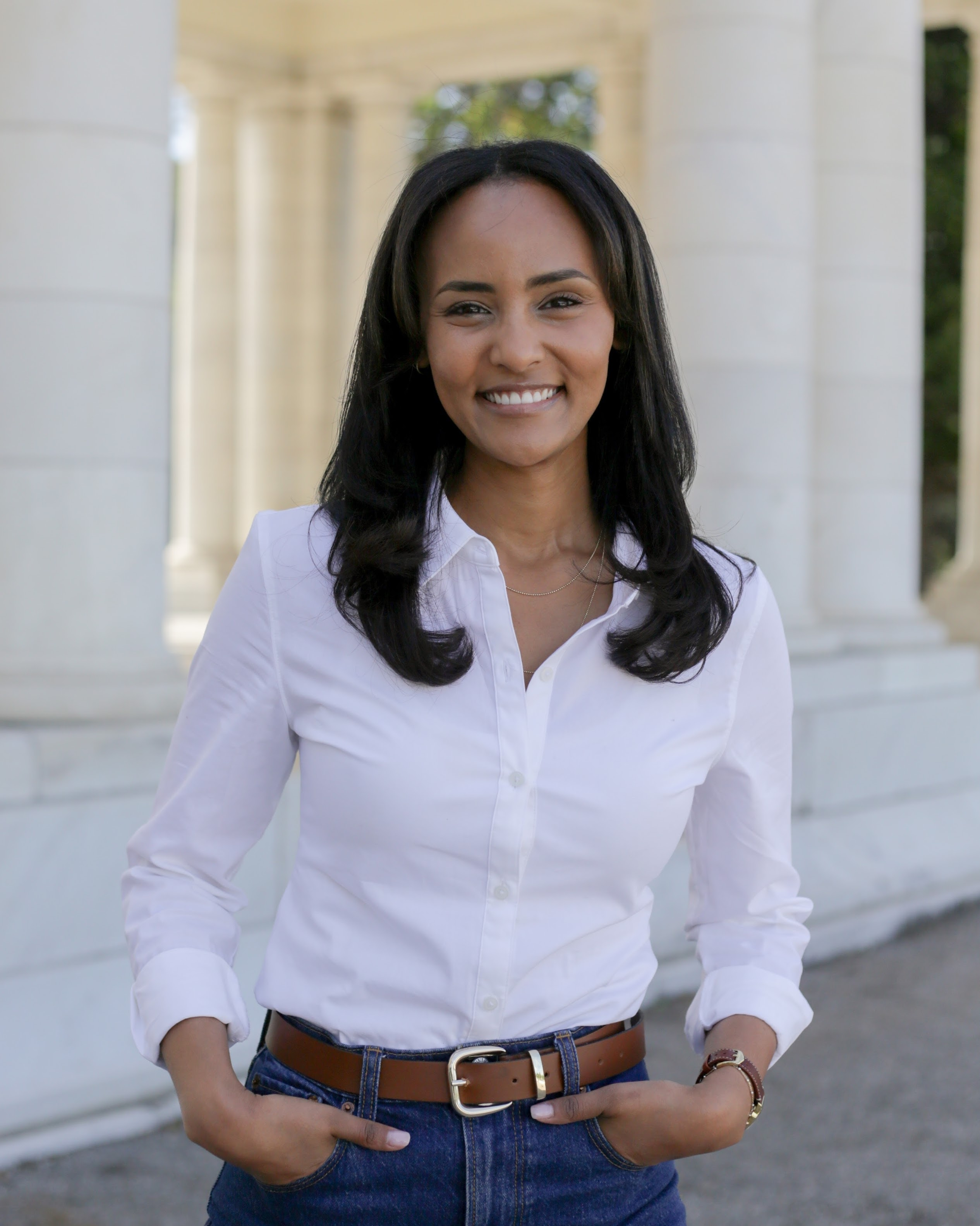
Melat Kiros (pictured) along with Ilhan Omar, are the first Horner American women elected to the U.S. Congress

Over an extended period, scholars investigate the intricate relationship between the need to maintain Ethiopian cultural identity and the demands of assimilating into the host community. Younger Ethiopian immigrants in particular may go through a dynamic process where they balance assimilating into their new environment's cultural norms with preserving ties to their heritage. Young Ethiopians' identity trajectories are significantly shaped by language, social interactions, and educational experiences in metropolitan Washington and other similar immigrant-receiving contexts. "By focusing on the multiple and changing dimensions of identity and its situational variations among the children of first-generation Ethiopian immigrants, this article provides insight into the subjective understandings of these various labels in an increasingly diverse city.". These people navigate their Ethiopian heritage in the context of the United States' diverse cultural landscape, looking at the obstacles and victories they face in maintaining parts of their identity while interacting with American society. Comprehending these dynamics offers valuable perspectives on the wider subjects of acculturation and identity construction in immigrant populations.

Economic, political, and social factors frequently come together to drive Ethiopian migration to the United States. Seeking better work opportunities, escaping poverty, and aiming for higher living standards are examples of economic motivations. Viewed as a land of economic opportunity, the United States draws people who want to give themselves and their families a better future by giving them access to jobs, education, and a higher standard of living. "In the countries of origin, these include economic downturns, deteriorating security, development projects entailing displacement, and environmental degradation as possible factors for migration whereas absence of these and similar other factors cause immigration to places of destination.". Migration in Ethiopia may also be influenced by social unrest and political unrest. People may decide to leave the nation in order to get away from social unrest, political upheaval, or persecution. Family reunification is another important factor, since Ethiopians who have already immigrated to the United States can encourage and assist the immigration of their relatives. Gaining insight into the complex causes of Ethiopian migration enhances one's understanding of the dynamics of diasporas and remittances within the Ethiopian community in the United States. Ethiopian diasporas in the United States have mostly settled in big cities like Washington, D.C., New York City, and Los Angeles, which are home to thriving immigrant communities. Because of this concentration, strong Ethiopian enclaves that promote a sense of belonging and support have grown. This migration has an impact on the socio-cultural dynamics of the diaspora that goes beyond simple geographic location. The relocation offers access to a variety of social networks, educational opportunities, and economic opportunities, but it also brings with it assimilation difficulties. The diaspora of Ethiopians in the United States must delicately strike a balance between the demands of assimilation and the preservation of their cultural identity. This delicate balancing act shapes the diaspora's sense of belonging, economic advancement, and cultural retention.

== See also ==
- Ethiopia–United States relations
- Little Ethiopia, Los Angeles
- Ethiopians in the United Kingdom
- Ethiopian Australians
- Ethiopian Canadians
- Ethiopians in Washington, D.C.
- History of Ethiopian Americans in Baltimore
- Southeast Africans in the United States
