= History of Ethiopian Americans in Baltimore =

The city of Baltimore, Maryland includes a small Ethiopian population. The Ethiopian-American community is centered in central Baltimore, particularly in Baltimore's historic Chinatown. This neighborhood is home to many Ethiopian businesses, including restaurants, a café, and a market. The enclave, located on the 300 block of Park Avenue, is sometimes referred to as Baltimore's Little Ethiopia.

== Demographics ==
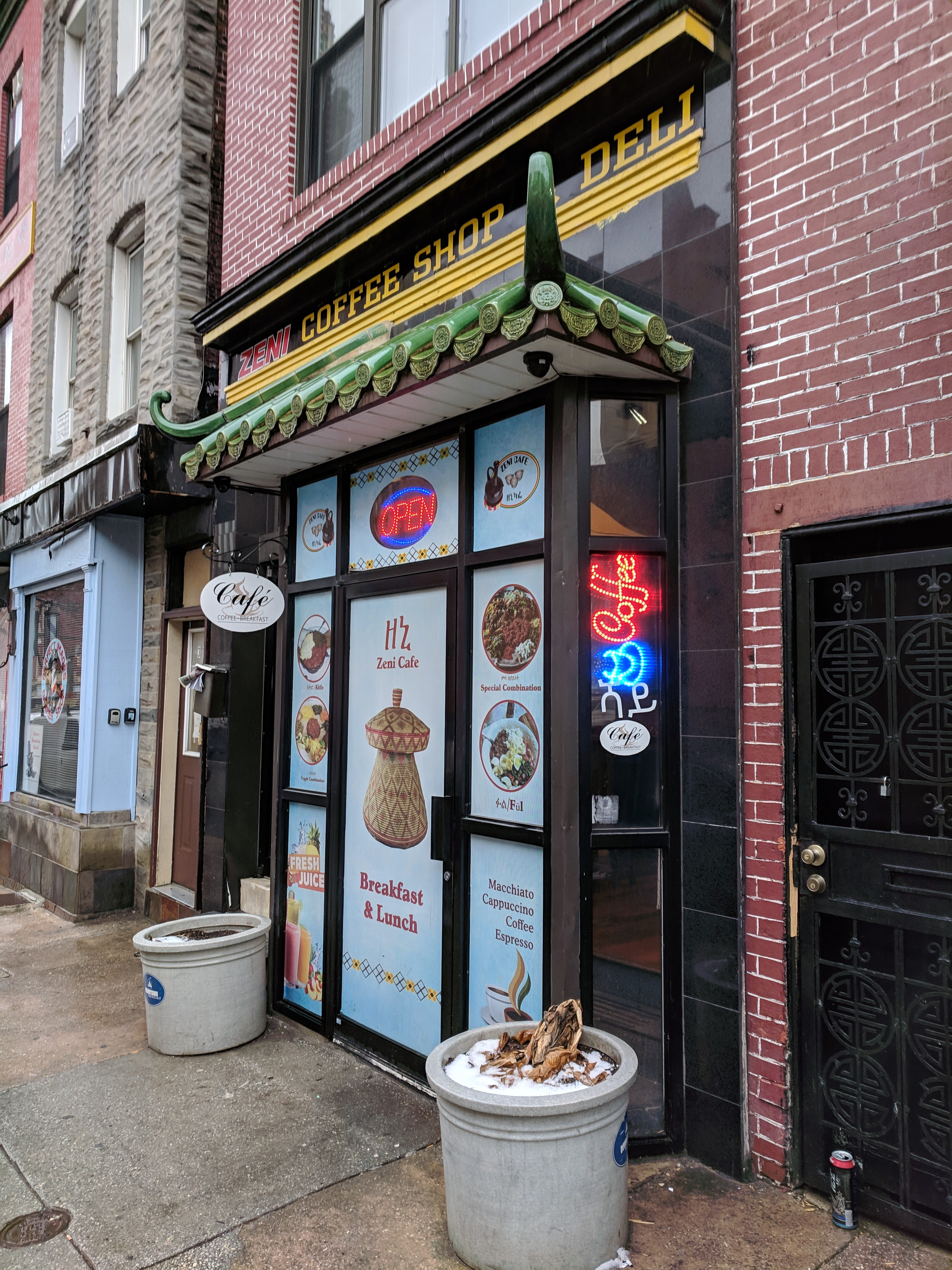
An Ethiopian coffee shop in Little Ethiopia, Baltimore, February 2019.

Of the approximately 75,000 Ethiopian Americans residing in Maryland, between 30,000 and 50,000 live in Greater Baltimore. The population generally works as small business owners, cab drivers, beauticians and medical technicians. The Ethiopian community is represented by the Ethiopian Community Center in Baltimore Inc. (ECCB), which provides educational and support services to the city's Ethiopian residents.

In 2011, immigrants from Ethiopia were the twenty-third largest foreign-born population in Baltimore.

== Culture ==
Due to Ethiopian entrepreneurs, Ethiopian coffee is experiencing a surge in popularity in the Baltimore area, with many restaurants and companies in the region now offering Ethiopian coffee.

As of 2013, there are about 25 doctors of Ethiopian and Eritrean background in the Baltimore–Washington metropolitan area, as well as Ethiopian-owned travel agencies, taxi companies, and parking garages.

== History ==
In 1994, several Ethiopian-Israeli Jewish students visited Northwestern High School in Baltimore in an effort to help bridge cultural divides between local Black and Jewish communities. The program was sponsored by the Anti-Defamation League and aimed to debunk stereotypes about Jews and promote awareness of Black Jews.

In the late 2010s, there have been attempts to revive and revitalize the Chinese-American presence in historic Chinatown, most notably by the Chinatown Collective, a group of Asian-American artists. In January 2019, the Collective reached an agreement with a group of non-Asian investors to for a $30,000,000 investment project in Chinatown/Little Ethiopia. This has caused fears among some Ethiopian residents who worry that this could entail gentrification that might displace poor and working-class Ethiopian residents and Ethiopian business owners.

== Religion ==
The majority of Ethiopian-Americans in Baltimore are Christians, with many belonging to the Ethiopian Orthodox Tewahedo Church. Smaller numbers of Evangelical Christians, Ethiopian Jews, and Ethiopian Muslims also live in Baltimore.

== See also ==
- Ethiopians in Washington, D.C.
