= Horners in the United States =

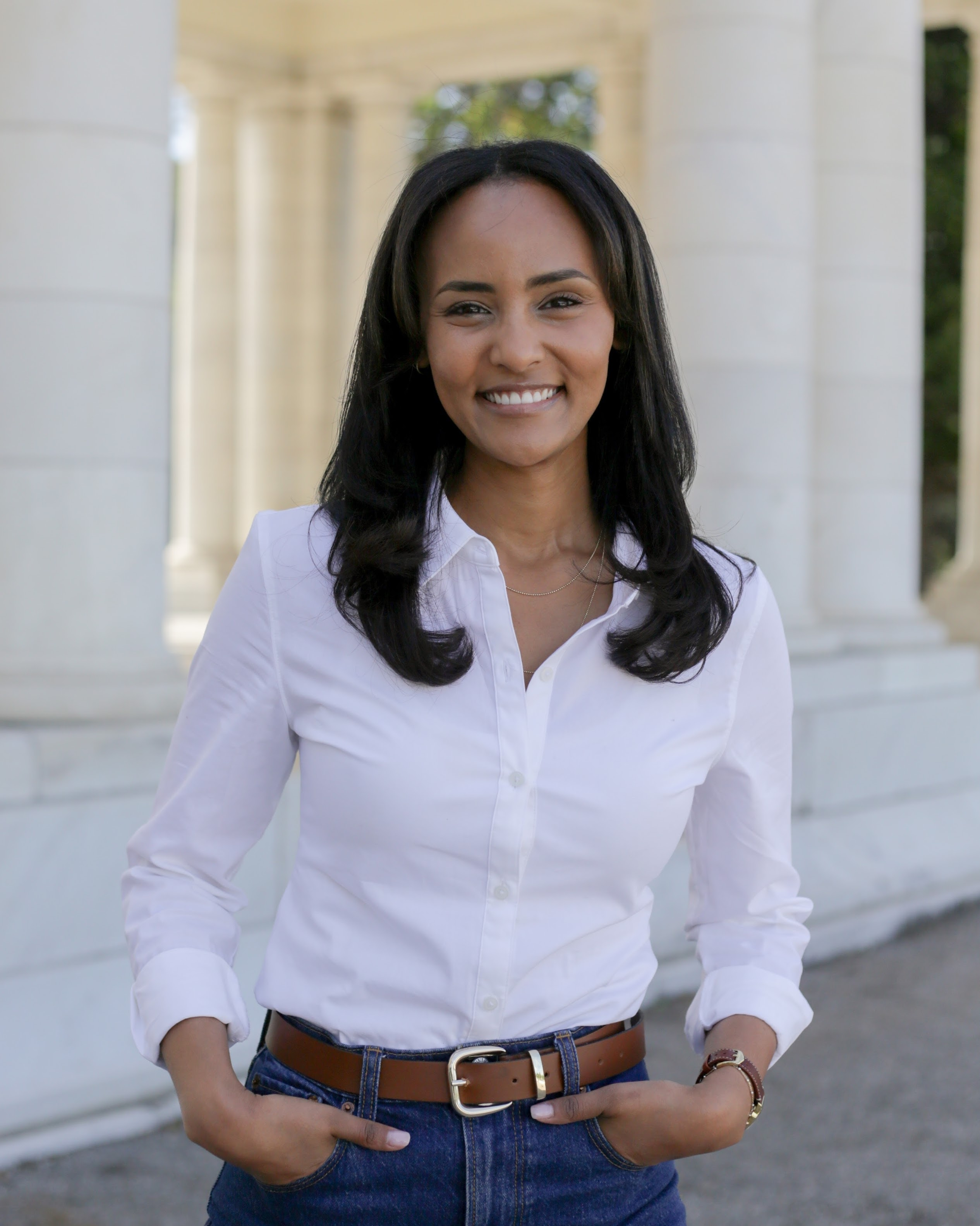
Melat Kiros (pictured) along with Ilhan Omar, are the first Horner American women elected to the U.S. Congress

Horn Africans in the United States, Horner Americans or Americans from the Horn of Africa are Americans with ancestry from the Horn of Africa. They include:

- Eritrean Americans
- Ethiopian Americans
- Somali Americans
  - History of Somali Bantus in Maine
- Sudanese Americans

== See also ==
- African Great Lakes
- East Africa
