= Electron Kebebew =

American surgeon and researcher (born 1968)

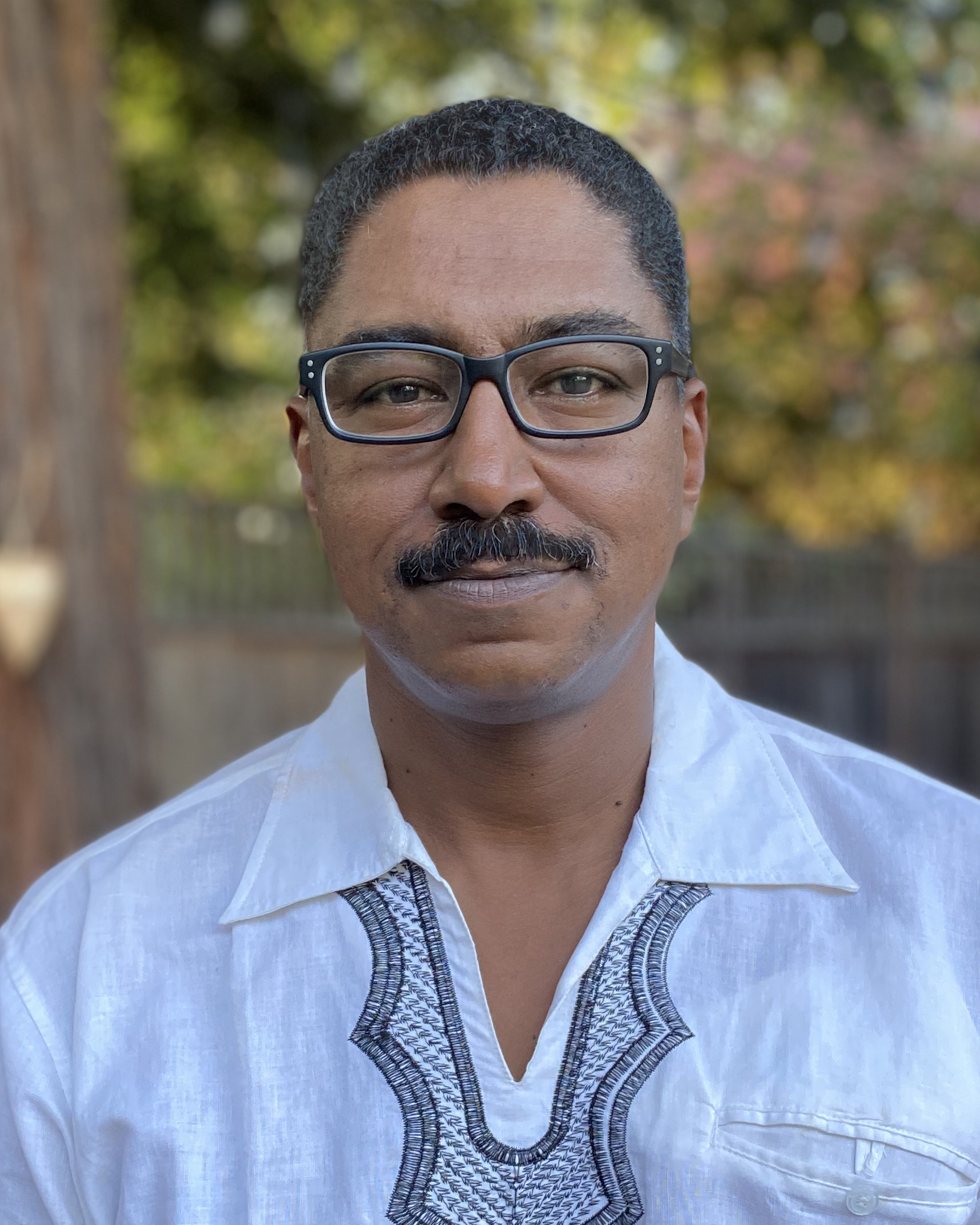
- Born: February 26, 1968 (age 57); Addis Ababa, Ethiopia
- Education: UCLA (B.S., 1991); UC San Francisco (M.D., 1995)
- Spouse: Tida Violante
- Children: Ezana Kebebew, Ras Kebebew

Electron Kebebew is an American surgeon, educator and scientist. Kebebew is currently the Harry A. Oberhelman Jr. and Mark L. Welton Professor and Chief of General Surgery at Stanford University.

== Early life and education ==
Electron Kebebew was born in Addis Ababa, Ethiopia on February 26, 1968. Kebebew graduated from the University of California, Los Angeles in 1991 with a B.S. in chemical engineering. In 1995, he graduated with a medicine degree from the University of California, San Francisco where he also went on to do his general surgery residency and postdoctoral fellowship.

== Career ==
=== Career at University of California, San Francisco ===
He received a T32 NIH Surgical Oncology Fellowship during 1997–1999 and worked in the endocrine oncology laboratory of Drs. Orlo H. Clark and Quan-Yang Duh. After finishing his training in 2002, Kebebew became an assistant professor of surgery at UCSF. He established his research and continued to operate on hundreds of patients with endocrine tumors each year at the Endocrine Surgery and Oncology Clinic at the UCSF Diller Comprehensive Cancer Center.

=== Career at the National Cancer Institute, National Institutes of Health ===
In 2009, Kebebew became one of the handful of African American tenured senior investigators at the National Institutes of Health (NIH) within the National Cancer Institute (NCI). Under the leadership of Harold E. Varmus, Kebebew became the inaugural Chief of the Endocrine Oncology Surgery Branch, overseeing $10 million in research each year. During his time at the NIH, Kebebew treated complicated cancer cases in thousands of patients from all over the world. The endocrine oncology surgery branch became an international model for educating surgeons to become researchers. His research laboratory at the NIH published hundreds of journal articles and produced dozens of scientists through the surgeon research training fellowship program.

=== Career at Stanford University ===
In 2018, Kebebew became the Chief of General Surgery and the Harry A. Oberhelman, Jr., and Mark L. Welton Professor of Surgery at Stanford University. He oversees the entire General Surgery Division, which includes colorectal surgery, minimally invasive and bariatric surgery, trauma/critical care and acute care surgery, surgical oncology (breast, gastrointestinal, hepatopancreaticobiliary, and endocrine surgery), and general surgery at the Veterans Affairs Palo Alto Health Care System. His research laboratory includes research fellows studying endocrine tumors.

== Scientific Research ==
As of 2020, he has published over 400 scientific articles, as well as textbooks and chapters, opinion pieces, reviews, and newsletter articles. His focus is on developing effective therapies for fatal, rare, and neglected endocrine cancers, identifying new methods, strategies, and technologies for improving the diagnosis and treatment of endocrine neoplasms and the prognosis of endocrine cancers, and developing methods for the precision treatment of endocrine tumors. His published works can be found on PubMed.gov.

=== Thyroid Journal ===
In 2020, Kebebew became the Editor-in-Chief of the scientific journal Thyroid and has served on the editorial board and as a reviewer for 54 biomedical journals.

== Organizations ==
Kebebew is a fellow of the American College of Surgeons, a member of the American Thyroid Association, American Association of Endocrine Surgeons, and the Society of Black Academic Surgeons. Kebebew is the Goodwill Ambassador for the nonprofit Ethiopia Reads, which promotes children’s literacy.

== Awards ==
Kebebew has received awards for his work from the American Cancer Society, American Association for Cancer Research, American Association of Endocrine Surgeons, International Association of Endocrine Surgeons and the American Thyroid Association’s Van Meter Award.
