= Ethiopians in Washington, D.C. =

Ethiopian community in Washington D.C., US

The Ethiopian American community in the Washington, D.C. metropolitan area is the largest ethnic Ethiopian community outside of Africa.

== History ==
Ethiopians began settling Washington, D.C. after the Derg overthrew Emperor of Ethiopia Haile Selassie in 1974.

Ethiopians moved to Adams Morgan in the 1980s. Adams Morgan served as a center of business of the Ethiopian community. In the mid-1990s, many Ethiopians began moving to the U Street area. Many moved out of Adams Morgan to other areas after rent became increasingly expensive.

The campaign to officially designate the U Street area as Little Ethiopia started around 2004. Elizabeth Chacko, the author of "Translocality in Washington, D.C. and Addis Ababa," stated that the Ethiopian community wanted the Little Ethiopia in Washington, D.C. because the city is the capital of the United States. However, this campaign was not successful. The author added that at that time, the Ethiopian area in Alexandria, Virginia had a higher concentration of Ethiopians compared to the one in Washington, D.C.

In 2004, the Mayor of Washington, D.C. signed the DC Language Access Act, which provided government services in five non-English languages including Amharic. The Ethiopians were among the groups campaigning for this act.

== Demographics ==
According to the 2010 U.S. census, there were 30,000 Ethiopian immigrants in the Washington, D.C. area, making up 20% of the total number of Ethiopian immigrants throughout the country. The Ethiopian American Constituency Foundation and the Ethiopian Community Development Council stated that the figure is wrong and, as paraphrased by Derek Kravitz of The Washington Post, "the local figure has a history of being underreported and probably tops 100,000". Yeshimebeth T. "Mama Tutu" Belay, an area businessperson, estimated that the population in the metropolitan area was about 250,000 as of 2010. Misty Showalter of CNN stated "other estimates are much lower." Washington 101: An Introduction to the Nation's Capital states that "One common estimate is that 200,000 Ethiopians reside in the D.C. metropolitan area."

According to the 2000 U.S. census, there were 15,000 in the Washington, D.C. area. However, the Ethiopian embassy stated that the actual number is closer to 200,000, and Brian Westley of The Washington Post stated "those who study African immigration" told him the same thing that the Ethiopian embassy told him.

Silver Spring, Maryland also has a large Ethiopian American population, restaurants, and businesses.

== Little Ethiopia, Washington, D.C. ==
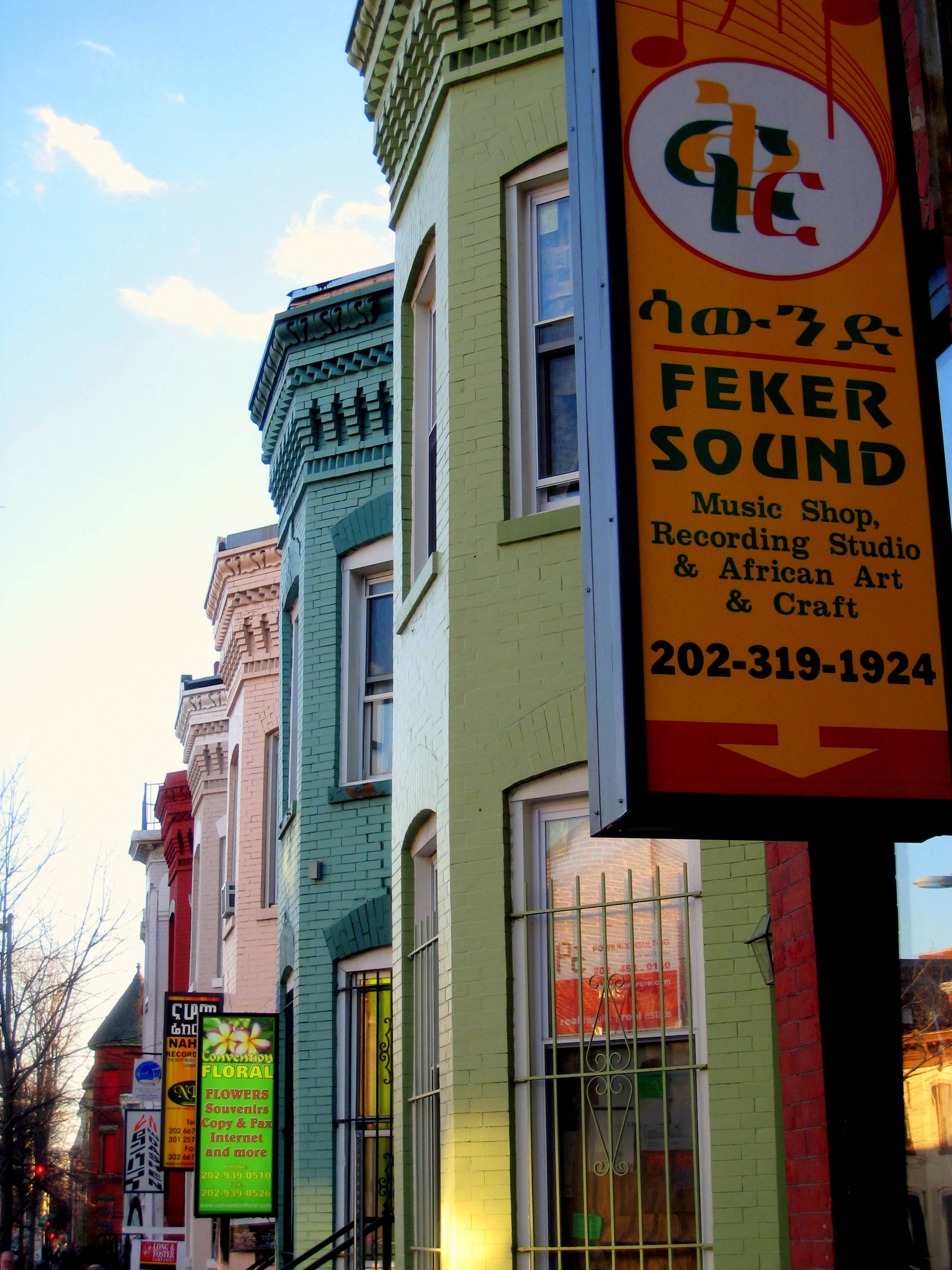
A portion of Little Ethiopia in the Shaw neighborhood.

Little Ethiopia, a Business and Cultural Community in and sub-division of the Shaw neighborhood of Washington, D.C., located around 9th and U Street Northwest. It is known for its concentration of Ethiopian businesses and residents.

Since the 1980s, Ethiopian-born business owners have been purchasing property in the neighborhood of Shaw, specifically Thirteenth and Ninth Streets. The area has since gained distinctive popularity in Washington even outside of the Ethiopian community. According to restaurant owner Tefera Zwedie: "I remember it was if I'm not mistaken somewhere between 2000, 2001 it was something big for us to see one non-Ethiopian coming to the restaurant. Now 95 percent of them are non-Ethiopian." The food has become a main attraction and reason for locals and tourists to commute to Shaw and experience the many local Ethiopian restaurants. This influx of Ethiopians has revitalized the area, prompting members of the Ethiopian American community to lobby the city government to officially designate the block as "Little Ethiopia". Although no legislation was proposed, Shaw residents have expressed opposition to the idea, concerned that such a designation would isolate that area from the historically African-American Shaw.

== Geography ==
Ethnic Ethiopian populations are found in Washington, D.C., as well as in many communities in Virginia and Maryland.

Washington, D.C. communities with ethnic Ethiopian residents include Adams Morgan, Brightwood, and Columbia Heights. There is a Little Ethiopia in Shaw.

Areas in Virginia with ethnic Ethiopian residents include Alexandria, Arlington County, Fairfax, Fairfax County, and Falls Church. Within Fairfax County, Ethiopian communities are present in areas such as Annandale, Springfield, and Vienna. Misty Showalter of CNN described the Alexandria Ethiopian community as "a second unofficial Little Ethiopia". As of 2006, some Ethiopians moved to Woodbridge, Prince William County and Sterling, Loudoun County during an increase of prices of real estate and rent rates in the area. As of 2010, some Ethiopian businesses had opened in Skyline, Falls Church.

In Maryland, Ethiopians have settled in Montgomery County and Prince George's County. Communities in the former which have received Ethiopians include Silver Spring, and Takoma Park. In the latter, the communities are Greenbelt, Clinton, District Heights, Fort Washington, Oxon Hill, and Upper Marlboro.

== Institutions ==
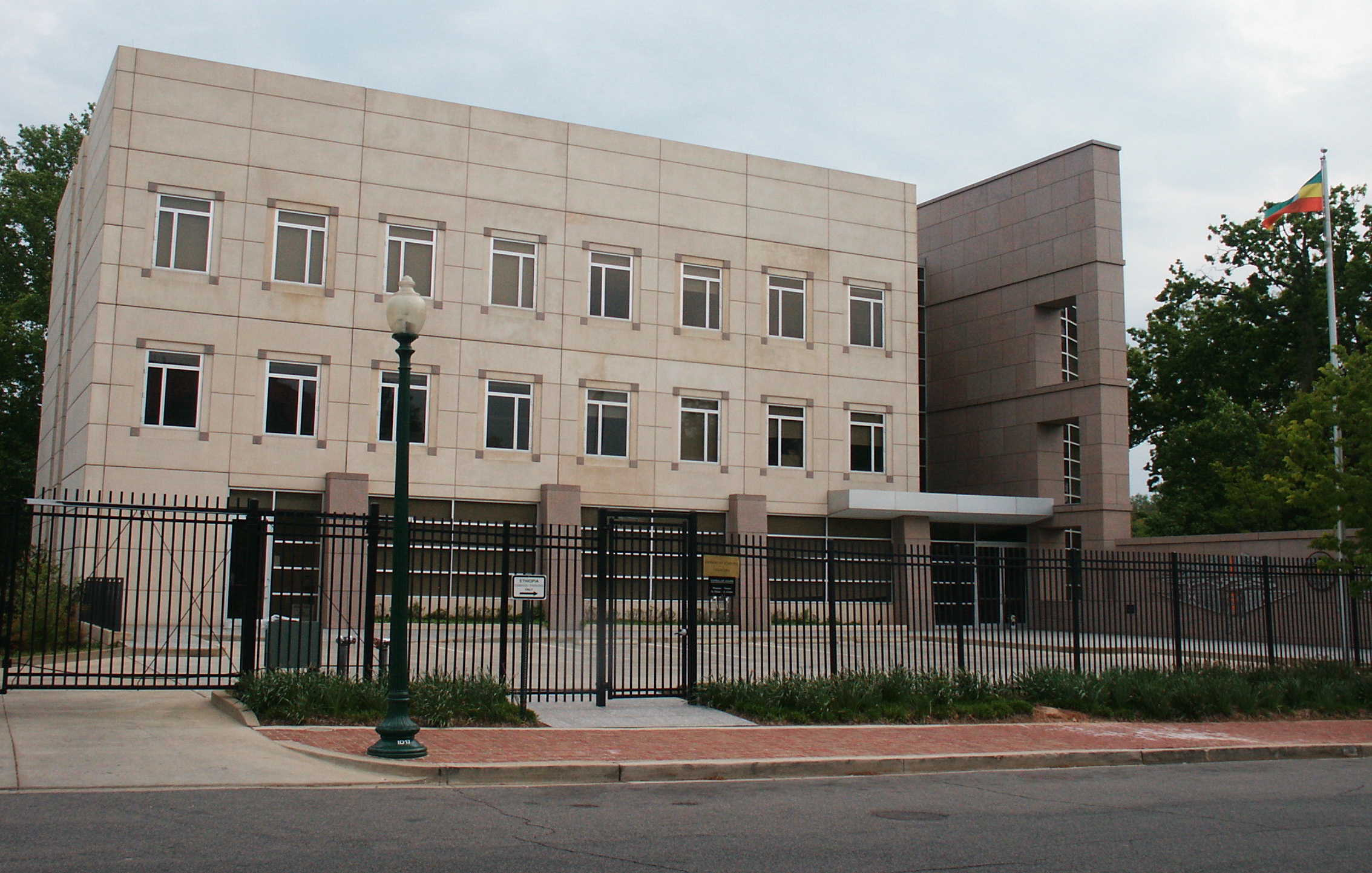
Embassy of Ethiopia, Washington, D.C.

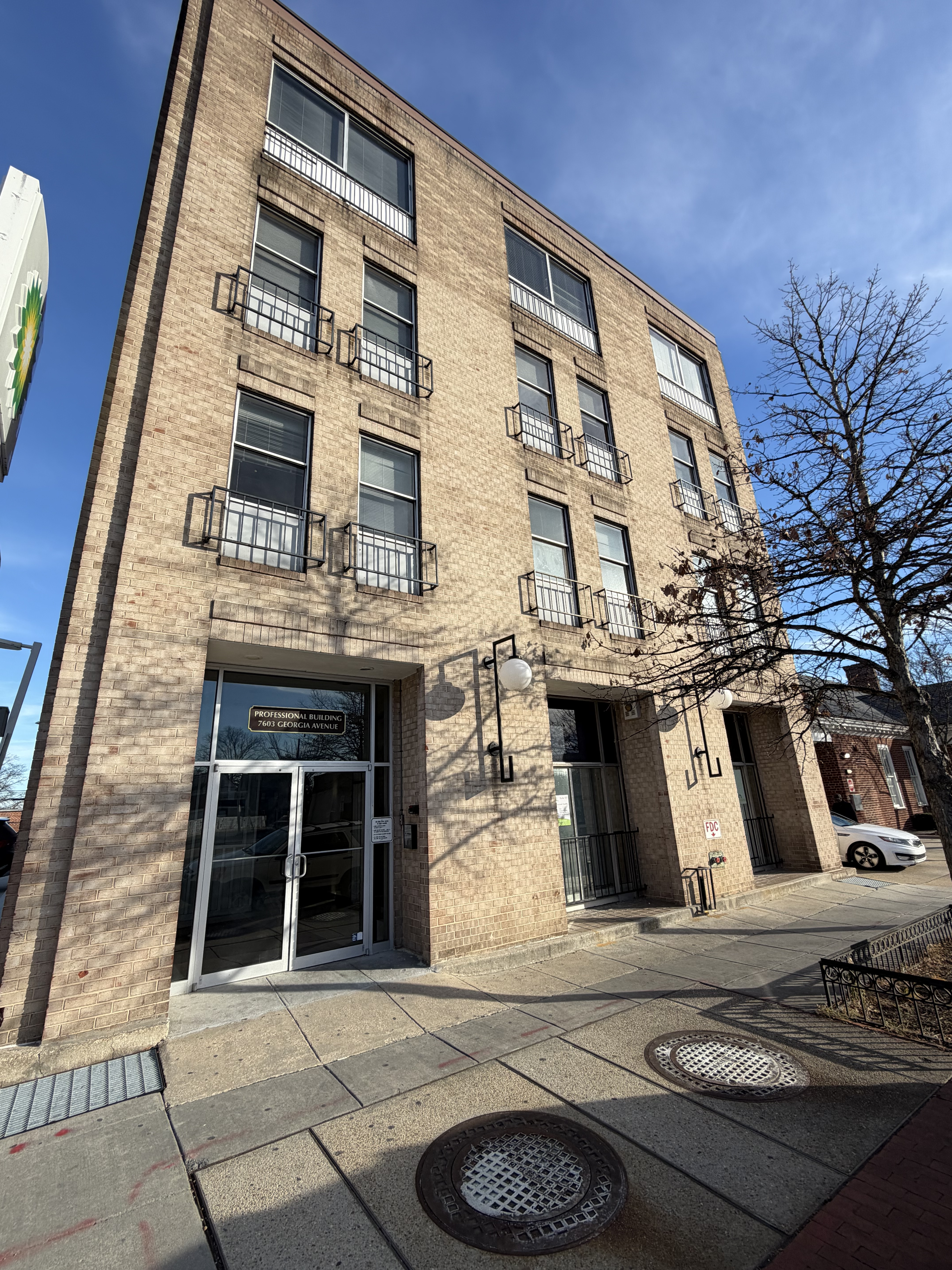
The professional building at 7603 Georgia Avenue NW in Washington, D.C., home as of 2025 to the Ethiopian Community Center.

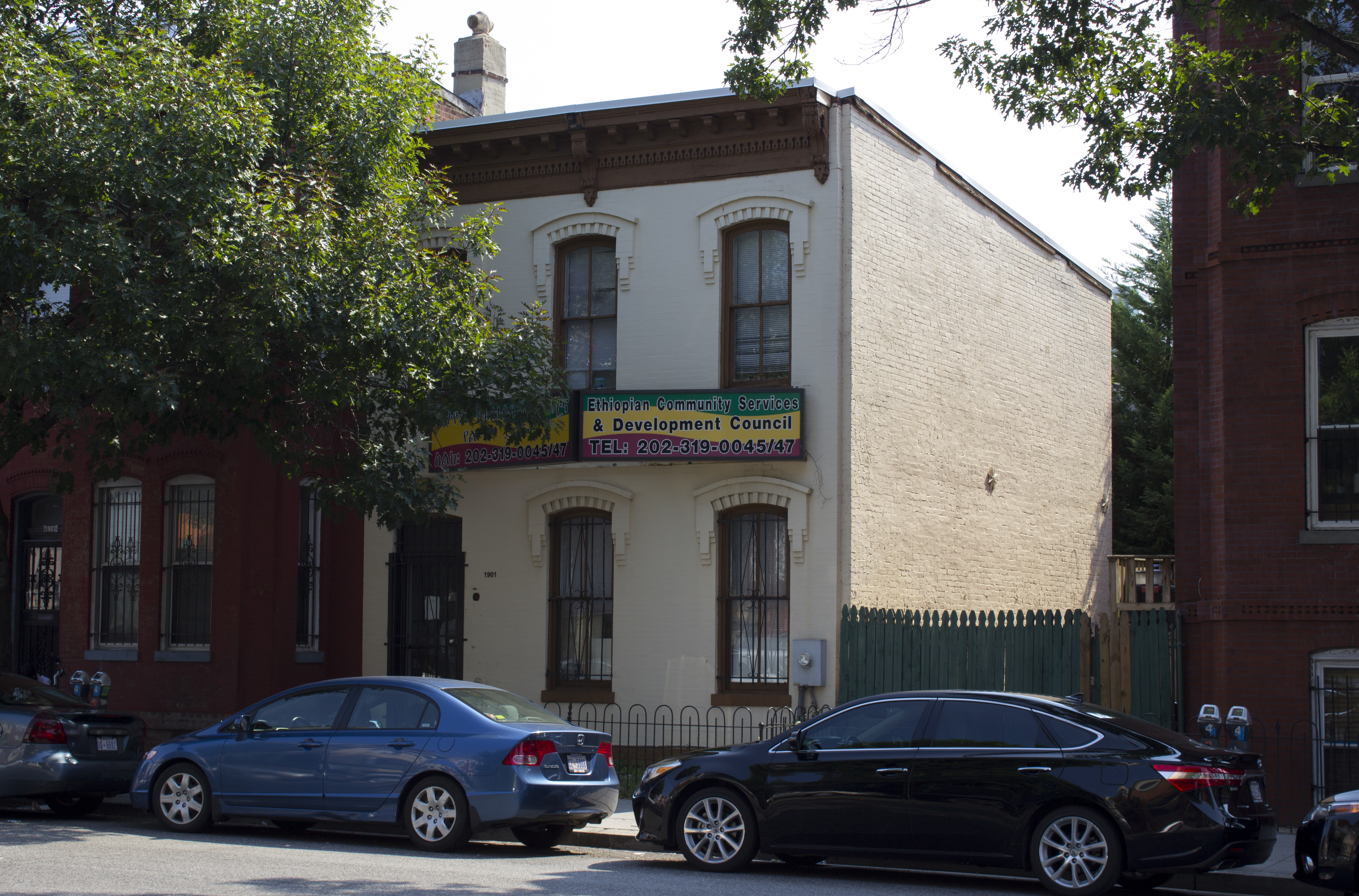
Ethiopian Community Services & Development Council

The Ethiopian Community Center, Inc. (ECC, Amharic: የኢትዮጵያ ሕብረተሰብ ማዕከል), headquartered in Washington, D.C., was established in 1980. The Ethiopian Community Development Council (ECDC), headquartered in Arlington, Virginia, promotes increased socioeconomic standing, culture, and education in the community and resettles refugees. The ECDC provided loans to 700 persons wishing to own businesses in a nine-year period ending in 2011; these loans totalled almost $4.5 million. The ECDC was established in 1983.

The Ethiopian American Constituency Foundation (EACF), which promotes political involvement of the Ethiopian community, was established in 2003. It campaigned for the formal recognition of the Little Ethiopia in Shaw. Ethiocorps, an organization which recruits area Ethiopian Americans to volunteer in Ethiopia, was established the following year.

The Embassy of Ethiopia, Washington, D.C. serves the community.

== Economy ==
In 2011, the Ethiopian Community Development Council stated that in Washington, D.C., Northern Virginia, and Maryland there were at least 1,200 businesses owned by ethnic Ethiopians.

The area has Ethiopian-owned Ethiopian restaurants and Ethiopian-owned non-Ethiopian restaurants. In 2011, "Mama Tutu" Belay stated that many Ethiopian restaurants had opened in the Petworth area of Washington DC, Arlington County, Virginia, and the downtown area of Silver Spring, Maryland.

As of 2013, there are about 25 doctors of Ethiopian and Eritrean background in the Baltimore-Washington area, as well as Ethiopian-owned travel agencies, taxi companies, and parking garages. As of 2010, many Ethiopians work as taxi drivers and parking attendants.

The United States offices of Ethiopian Airlines are in Alexandria, Virginia.

== Media ==
The D.C. area has Ethiopian newspapers, including Ze Ethiopia.

The Ethiopian Yellow Pages (Amharic: የኢትዮጵያ የሎው ፔጅስ) is published in Alexandria, Virginia, and the headquarters of the publication is in Shaw, Washington, D.C. It has over 1,000 pages of content. As of 2011 Yeshimebeth T. "Mama Tutu" Belay is the publisher and her husband Yehunie Belay assists her. "Mama Tutu" Belay began the publication around 1994 by compiling lists of area businesses.

In 2007, there were plans to create an Ethiopian television network in Alexandria. Another media company that is currently operating is Ethiopique, a local news organization founded in 2022 that produces news and reporting for Amharic speaking communities in the Washington, D.C., Maryland, and Virginia area. The outlet focuses on local issues, civic engagement, and community affairs relevant to Ethiopian and Eritrean diaspora residents in the region. Ethiopique has received support through national journalism and civic media initiatives, including funding from Press Forward, a $500 million national effort to strengthen local news, as well as grants from the Listening Post Collective and participation in the Documented education program. In 2025, Ethiopique won the Public Service Award in the micro revenue tier at the LION Publishers Sustainability Awards, an annual awards program recognizing excellence and sustainability among independent local news organizations in the United States and Canada.

== Religion ==
Due to the large Ethiopian and Jewish populations in Washington, D.C. and Silver Spring, the Greater Washington metropolitan area is home to sizeable communities of Beta Israel (Ethiopian Jews) and Ethiopian Muslims. Most Ethiopians in the region are Christian, most being Orthodox Christians.

== Recreation ==
The Ethiopian Expo is held in Washington, D.C. every year. It is organized by "Mama Tutu" Belay.

== Legacy ==
The novel The Beautiful Things That Heaven Bears by Dinaw Mengestu is about an Ethiopian who moved to Washington, D.C. to get political asylum.

== Notable residents ==
- Yehunie Belay (singer)
- Tamagne Beyene (entertainer)
- Nebiyu Eyassu (author and journalist)
- Kelela (R&B singer and songwriter)
- Hailu Mergia (Ethio-jazz organist and keyboardist)

== See also ==
- History of Ethiopian Americans in Baltimore
