= Little Ethiopia, Los Angeles =

Neighborhood of Los Angeles, California, United States

Little Ethiopia ትንሿ ኢትዮጵያ
- Neighborhood of Los Angeles
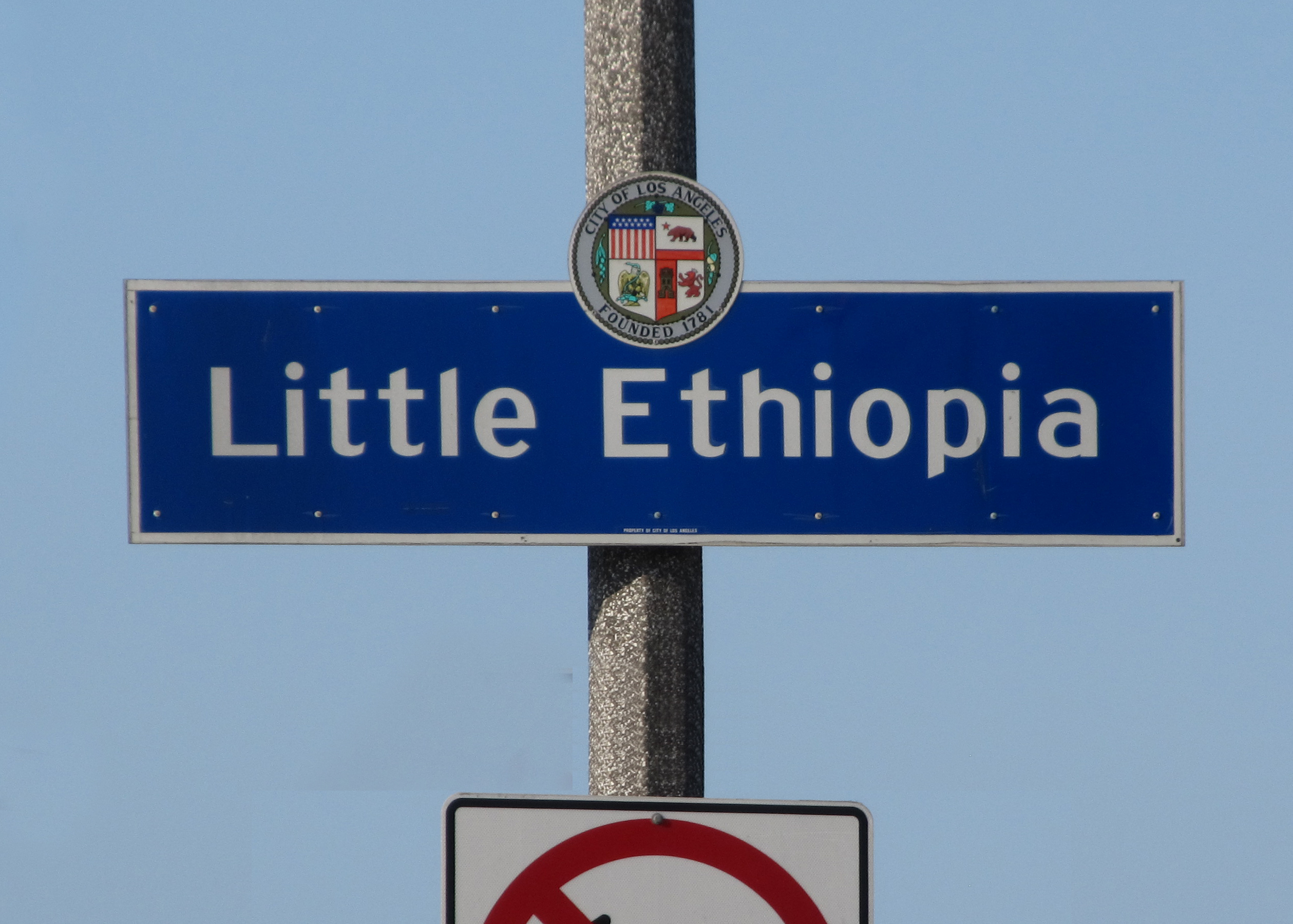
- Little Ethiopia neighborhood sign located at the intersection of Fairfax Avenue and Olympic Boulevard
- Interactive map of Little Ethiopia
- Location within Western Los Angeles
- Coordinates: 34.057028°N 118.364389°W
- Country: United States of America
- State: California
- County: Los Angeles
- Time zone: Pacific
- Postal code: 90019
- Area code: 323

Little Ethiopia (Amharic: ትንሿ ኢትዮጵያ) is a neighborhood in the central region of Los Angeles. It is known for its collection of Ethiopian restaurants, coffee shops, boutiques and thrift stores.

== History ==
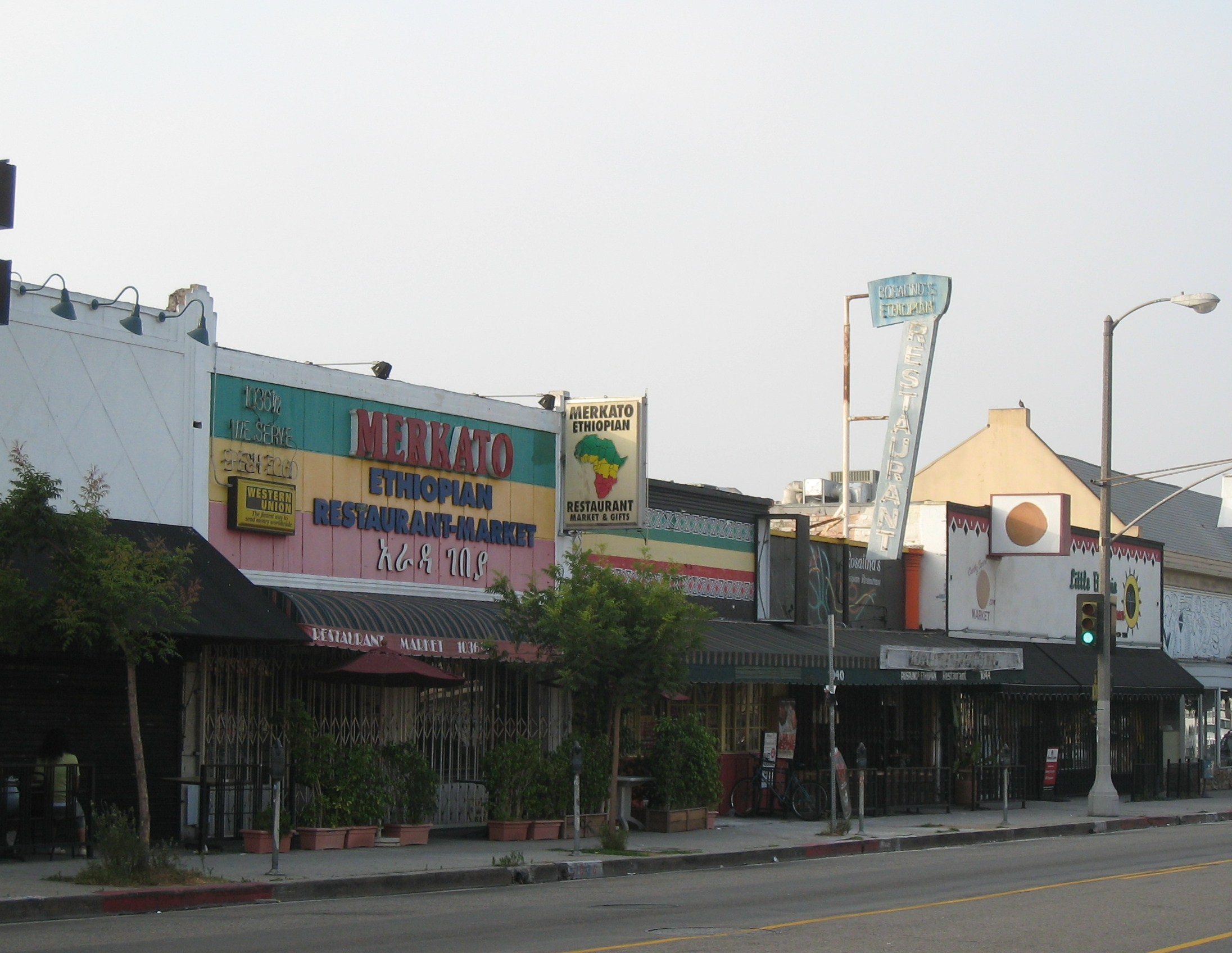
Businesses along Fairfax Avenue in Little Ethiopia

.

The neighborhood of Little Ethiopia dates back to the early 1990s. Inspired by the success of "Little Ethiopia" in Washington D.C., Ethiopian Immigrant Fekere Gebre-Mariam who immigrated to Los Angeles in 1971 moved his restaurant Rosalind's to South Fairfax Avenue. During this time, the neighborhood wasn't established as Little Ethiopia but was an extension of a prominent Jewish community running between Olympic Boulevard and Whitworth Drive. The nickname given to this block was "SoFax". Gebre-Mariam saw a vision to turn this street into all things Ethiopian and dedicate a business center that showcases the Ethiopian culture. Soon after, more Ethiopian business started to emerge and Gebre-Mariam's vision came to fruition. The South Fairfax block became a hub for Ethiopian business featuring five Ethiopian restaurants, a coffeehouse, a market, a travel agency, and a silk screen shop by 1994. In the 1990s, the neighborhood was called "Little Addis", referring to Ethiopia's capital, Addis Ababa. After a growing success, lobbying efforts were made by the various owners of these restaurants such as Gebre-Mariam (Rosiland Restaurant), Belay Dawit (Merkato Restaurant & Market), Meshesha Biru (Nile Travel), and brothers Birhanu and Getahun Asfaw (Messob Restaurant) to designate the three blocks between Olympic Boulevard and Whitworth Drive as "Little Ethiopia". In November 2002, the Los Angeles City Council unanimously granted official recognition of the area as "Little Ethiopia" making it a cultural and commercial district. The area as of today has a high concentration of Ethiopian businesses and restaurants, as well as a significant concentration of residents of Ethiopian and Eritrean ancestry. By 2006, there were 15 Ethiopian businesses in the neighborhood, including restaurants, markets, a clothing store, a hair salon and a travel agency.

== Geography ==
Little Ethiopia is located on Fairfax Avenue between Olympic Boulevard and Whitworth Drive. The neighborhood of Carthay Square is west and Wilshire Vista is east. Faircrest Heights is southwest, Picfair Village is southeast and Miracle Mile is northeast.

== Events and festivals ==
Little Ethiopia hosts a cultural festival on September 11 every year to celebrate Enkutatash, which marks the Ethiopian New Year based on the Gregorian calendar. This holiday is a time for gathering, enjoying food, listening to music, and watching cultural dance performances on Fairfax avenue.

It is a large community event that brings together hundreds of people and hosts local business and food vendors. The Little Ethiopia Cultural Street Festival creates a space for the Ethiopian culture to be showcased and shared with a larger Los Angeles audience. According to the 2024 report by the Los Angeles Sentinel, the 23rd annual New Year Cultural Street Festival brought in hundred of people. Many people attended wearing cultural clothing and were seen buying Ethiopian jewelry, crafts, and arts. The event also featured the Ethiopian coffee ceremony and live music that lasted into the evening. The organizers of this event feel that the festival is important for uniting the community and passing on traditions to younger generations.

== Restaurants and dining ==
Little Ethiopia is known as a hot spot in Los Angeles to try Ethiopian food. There are a variety of places to eat traditional Ethiopian dishes. According to The Infatuation, Lalibela Restaurant is a fan favorite that offers a more relaxed and cozy feel, which a lot of visitors enjoy. This restaurant offers large shared platters, including vegetarian dishes served on injera, which is a spongy sourdough bread staple of Ethiopian cuisine. Messob Ethiopian Restaurant is another well-known spot and has been in the neighborhood since 1985. It features authentic recipes and plays a major role in shaping Little Ethiopia's food scene. Located nearby is also Merkato, a popular restaurant and market for common Ethiopian goods. It serves traditional meals, but also sells Ethiopian spices, coffee, and cultural items, giving visitors a more complete experience. Meals by Genet and Rosalind's Ethiopian Cuisine are also commonly mentioned as neighborhood favorites. Similarly, they offer bold flavors and exhibit the traditional communal way of eating, gursha. Altogether, these restaurants help make the Fairfax Avenue neighborhood a key spot for Ethiopian culture and food in Los Angeles.

== Media and representation ==
Little Ethiopia has slowly gained the attention of popular media, reflecting the growing popularity of this commercial district that portrays the Ethiopian culture. In 2011, the popular cartoon show, The Simpsons, featured the fictional family dining in an Ethiopian restaurant inspired by Little Ethiopia. The episode was well received by the Ethiopian community and praised for its respectful depiction of the Ethiopian cuisine and cultural practices such as the gursha, which is an honorable act of feeding another loved one with your hands. Gursha is a sign of respect and care done for others to show love and practice community.

More recent portrayals of Little Ethiopia is the HBO series, Insecure, directed by Issa Rae. In season 4, episode 6, one of the prominent restaurants in Little Ethiopia, Merkato Ethiopian Restaurant & Market was featured.
