= Metasebia Yoseph =

Ethiopian entrepreneur

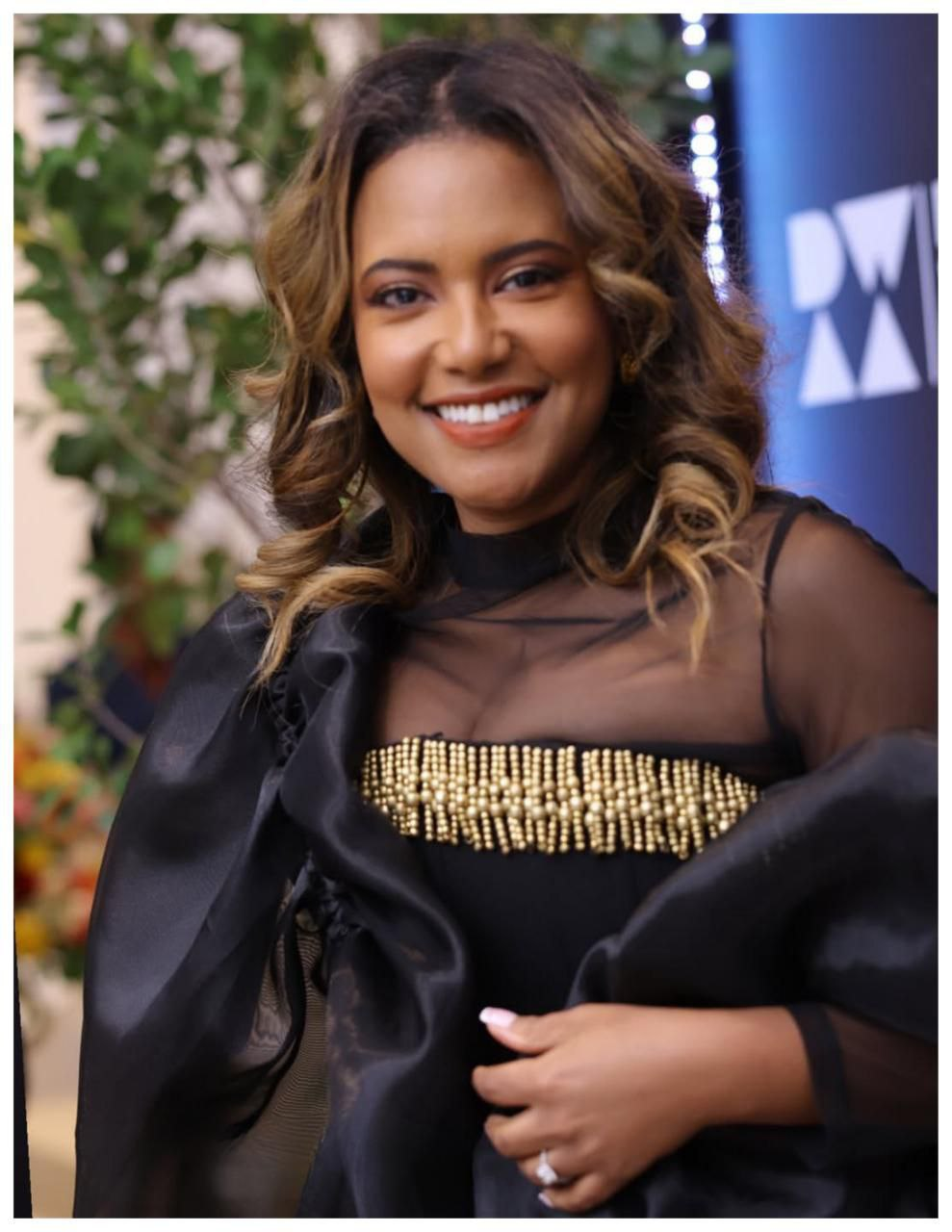
- Born: Washington, D.C., United States
- Education: University of Maryland, College Park (BA, Art History, 2009); Georgetown University (MA, Communication, Culture and Technology, 2013)
- Occupations: Cultural strategist; Author; Media entrepreneur
- Known for: Founder of Design Week Addis Ababa; Founder of Addis Futures Lab; Co-founder of D!NK TV
- Notable work: A Culture of Coffee (2013 publication)
- Awards: Interledger Foundation – Grant for the Web; TRUE Africa – Top 100 Innovators (2015)

Metasebia Yoseph is an Ethiopian-American author and media entrepreneur. She founded Design Week Addis Ababa, Ethiopia's first international design festival, and Addis Futures Lab, a cultural strategy platform. She is the co-founder of D!NK TV, whose reality series Latey: Looking for Love has been described by the BBC as Ethiopia's first dating show. Her book A Culture of Coffee (2013) is archived by the Library of Congress.

== Early life and education ==
Yoseph was born in Washington, D.C. She studied art history at the University of Maryland, graduating in 2009, and received a Master of Arts in communication, culture, and technology from Georgetown University in 2013.

== Entrepreneurship and career ==
Yoseph founded Design Week Addis Ababa in 2015, an international design festival that has included exhibitions, workshops, and collaborations with organizations such as the British Council and foreign embassies. In 2025, Yoseph transitioned leadership of the festival to a new team and continues to serve as an advisor.

Between 2016 and 2018, she worked in the financial technology sector as Chief Marketing Officer and Senior Business Innovation Manager at Kifiya Financial Technology. During this period, she contributed to the development of MELA, a remittance service launched with Mastercard, and YeneGuzo, a transport payment system created with government partners.

In 2018, Yoseph established Addis Futures Lab, a cultural strategy and advisory platform focused on innovation and market development in Africa. The Lab focuses on sectors related to Africa’s economic and cultural development, including media and entertainment, sustainable beauty, agri-processing, cultural intelligence, educational, and financial technology. Projects have included cultural heritage digitization in partnership with Google Arts & Culture and advisory work for development agencies and cultural institutions.

She co-founded D!NK TV in 2022, a youth-focused media company. Its reality series Latey: Looking for Love has been described as Ethiopia’s first dating show and received more than 600,000 views within two months of its premiere.

== Publications and media contributions ==
Yoseph is the author of A Culture of Coffee (2013), a book on the history and culture of coffee that is archived by the Library of Congress. A digital anniversary edition was released in 2022, incorporating blockchain technology for cultural preservation.

Her articles and commentary have been published in outlets including The Guardian, Quartz Africa, Nataal Media, and Selamta Magazine. She has also been profiled by BBC News and OkayAfrica in connection with her work in cultural innovation and digital media.

== Recognition ==
In 2015, Yoseph was included in TRUE Africa’s Top 100 Innovators list for contributions to Africa’s cultural and digital sectors.

She later received the Interledger Foundation’s Grant for the Web, awarded for projects in digital finance and media innovation.
