= Dereje Agonafer =

Ethiopian-American engineer and educator

- ደረጀ አጎናፍር
- Born: Dereje Agonafer; Addis Ababa, Ethiopia
- Occupation: Professor of mechanical engineering at University of Texas at Arlington

Dereje Agonafer (Ge'ez: ደረጀ አጎናፍር) is an Ethiopian-American engineer and educator, who is currently a professor of mechanical engineering at University of Texas at Arlington, and member of National Academy of Engineering. He is also a fellow of National Academy of Inventors since 2018.

== Education and career ==
Prof. Agonafer received his B.S. in Aerospace Engineering from University of Colorado Boulder in 1972. After obtaining his PhD from Howard University in (1984), he joined IBM. He served at IBM for 15 years before joining University of Texas at Arlington as tenured Professor. Prof. Agonafer's research focuses on Electronic packaging, heat transfer, thermal engineering.

== Recognitions ==
In 2019, Agonafer was elected to the prestigious National Academy of Engineering for "contributions to computer-aided electro/thermo/mechanical design and modeling of electronic equipment". He also is a fellow of the National Academy of Inventors, the American Association for the Advancement of Science, the American Society of Mechanical Engineers and lifetime member of National Society of Black Engineers.
