= Wilshire Vista, Los Angeles =

Wilshire Vista
- Neighborhood of Los Angeles
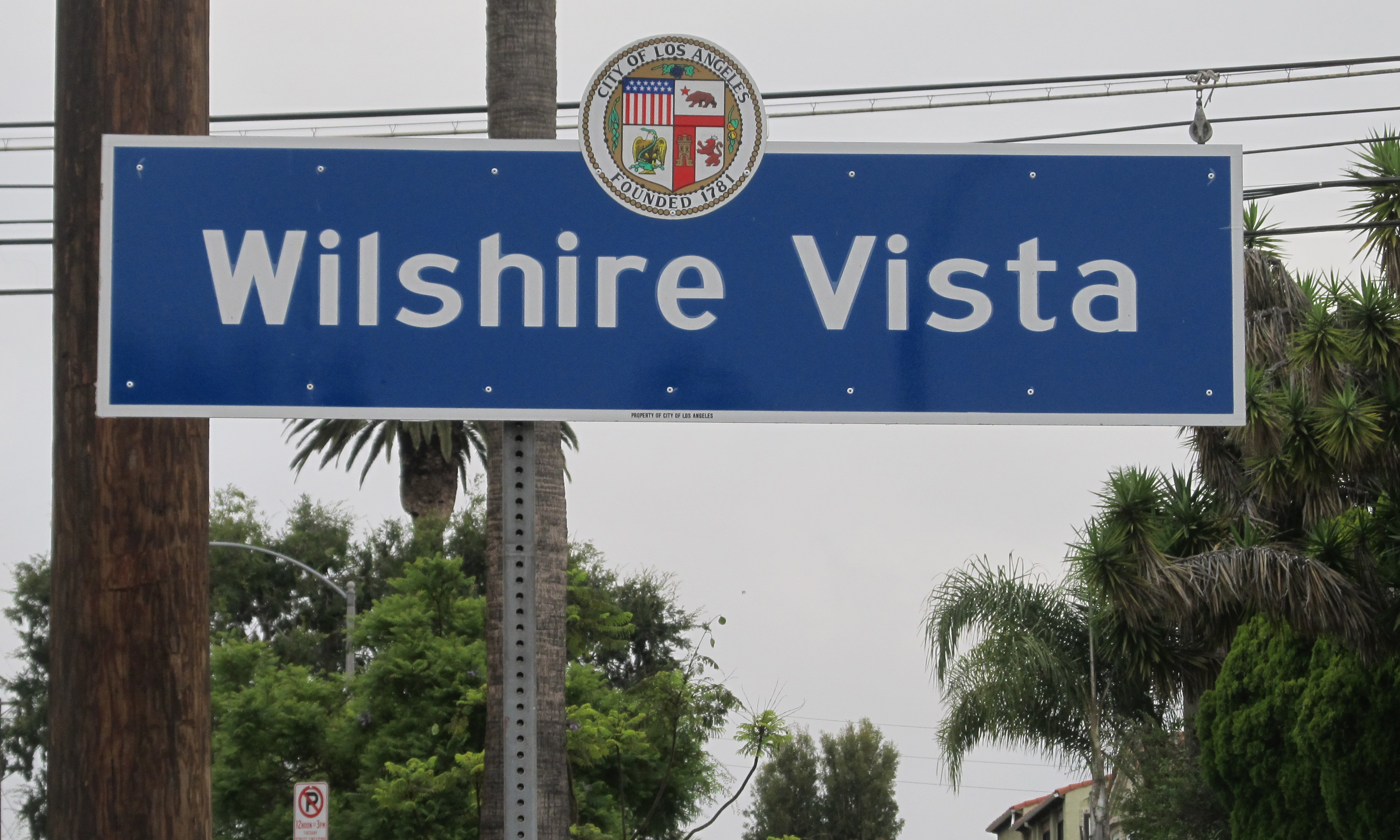
- Wilshire Vista neighborhood sign located at the intersection of Pico Boulevard and Stanley.

- Location within Los Angeles
- Coordinates: 34°03′00″N 118°21′36″W
- Country: United States of America
- State: California
- County: Los Angeles
- Time zone: Pacific
- Zip Code: 90010
- Area code: 323

Wilshire Vista is a neighborhood in the central region of Los Angeles.

== History ==
A portion of Wilshire Vista was part of a 120-acre farm purchased in 1870 by Joseph Masselin, a French miner who had failed at prospecting in the 1849 California Gold Rush and then settled in the Los Angeles area in 1870. His heirs sold 73 acres fronting on Wilshire Boulevard to Walter G. McCarty, John A. Vaughn and John Evans, who combined it with other land to form the Wilshire Vista tract.

Sales and development began in 1922 on 85 acres of high, rolling ground between Pico, Cahuenga and Wilshire boulevards, with "the promising of a [street]car line, the new Los Angeles High School within eight minutes walk, the Page Military Academy on the adjoining property, the convenience to the city and beaches via the boulevards, as well as Country Club Drive and San Vicente Boulevard running across the tract."

In 2001, the Los Angeles Times noted that Wilshire Vista was historically an African-American community, but had now become more varied in ethnic composition with the arrival of young families and single professionals.

in 2015, the northwest corner of Wilshire Vista was determined historically significant by SurveyLA and was named the "Orange Grove Avenue-Ogden Drive-Genesee Avenue Multi-Family Residential Historic District". This part of Wilshire Vista contains a unique district of multifamily homes adjacent to single family homes, built between 1927-1950 and most of which (96 percent) are still in their original condition.

In 2020, Wilshire Vista West was added to the National Register of Historic Places and the California Register of Historical Resources.

== Geography ==
Wilshire Vista is bounded by San Vicente Boulevard on the north, Hauser Boulevard on the east, Pico Boulevard on the south and Fairfax Avenue on the west.

== Notable Landmarks ==
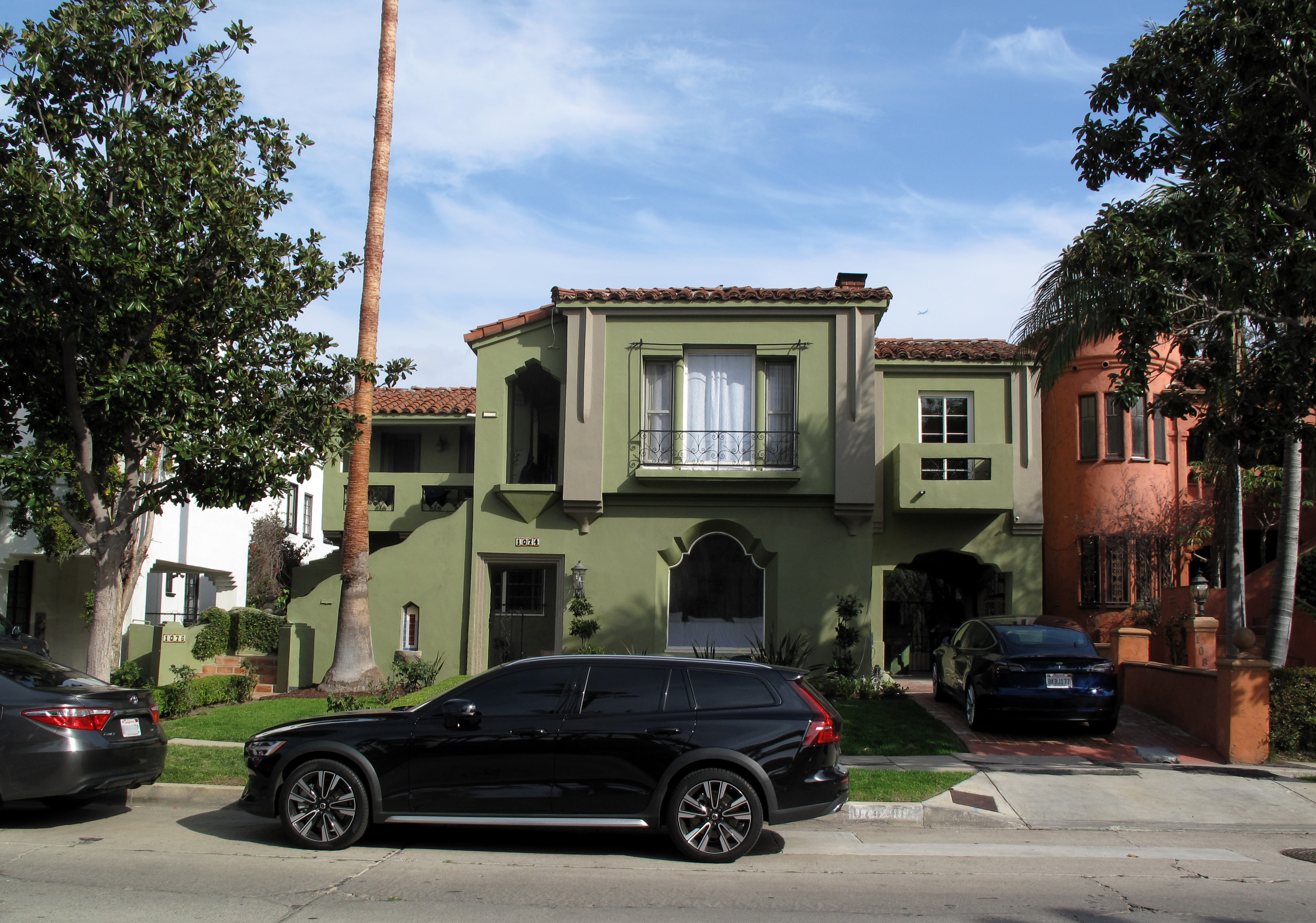
1074-76 S. Genesee

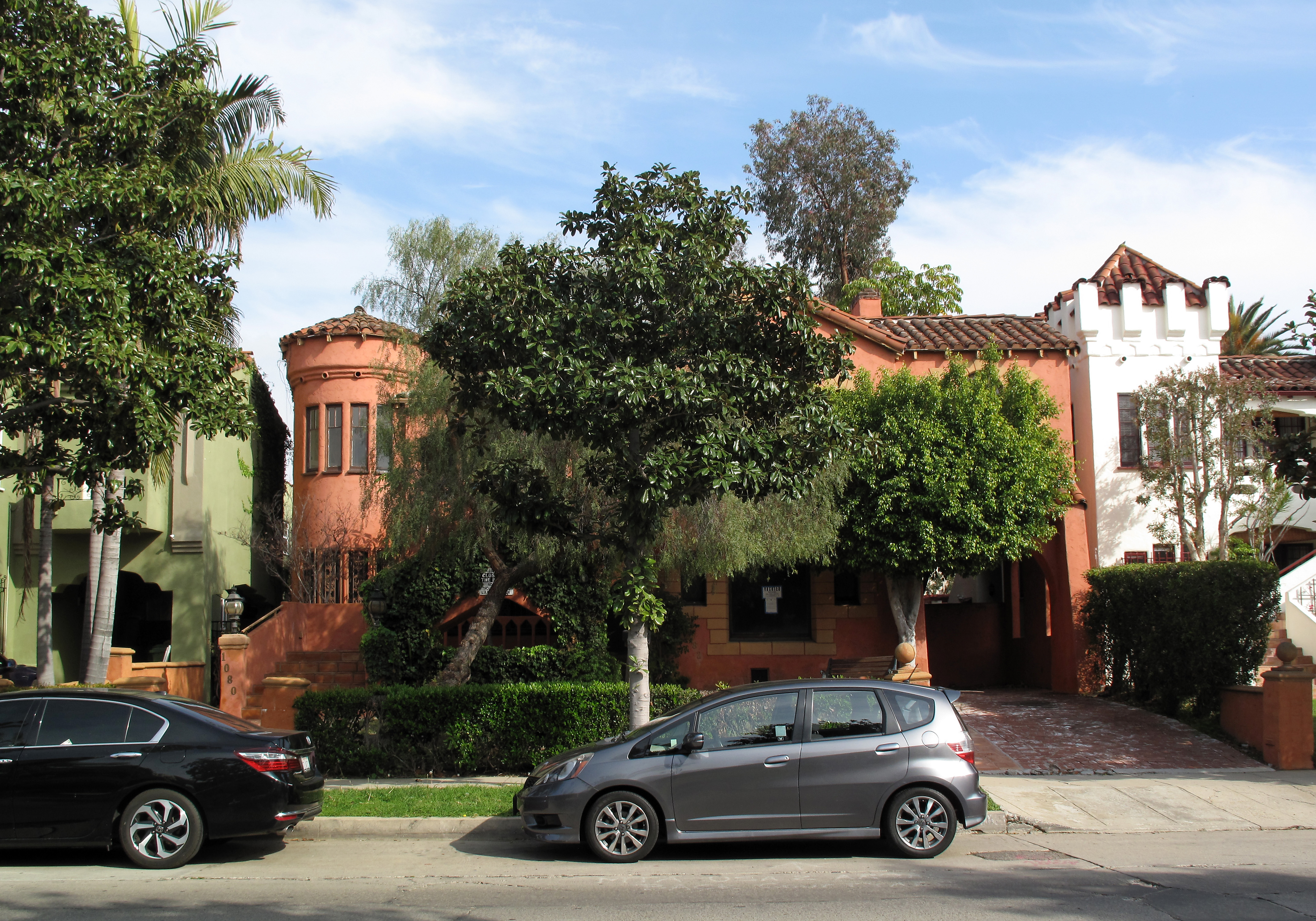
1080-82 S. Genesee

- Charlotte Chase Apartments -1074-76 South Genesee Avenue - Los Angeles Cultural Historic Monument 1179
- Charles H. Bevis Duplex - 1080-82 South Genesee - Los Angeles Cultural Historic Monument 1180
- Packard Well Site: 5733 W. Pico Blvd. - Opened in 1968, The Packard Well Site is a drilling location disguised to look like a nondescript office building from street level. There are 51 active wells and the site continues to produce thousands of barrels of oil each year.
