= Troubleshooter =

A troubleshooter is someone who performs troubleshooting.

It may also refer to:

== Music ==
- Troubleshooter (EP), a 2022 EP by Kep1er
- Haegyeolsa ("Troubleshooter" or "Resolver"), a pop album released by the Korean boy band Shinhwa in 1998
- The Troubleshooters (album), a hip-hop music album by the Latino group Funkdoobiest in 1998

== Television ==
- Troubleshooter (TV series), a British reality TV series aired between 1990 and 1993
- The Troubleshooters (British TV series), a British TV series between 1965 and 1972
- The Troubleshooters (American TV series), an American TV series aired between 1959 and 1960
- "Trouble Shooter!", a 1988 episode of The Raccoons

== Others ==
- Troubleshooter (2010 film), a South Korean film in 2010
- Troubleshooter (Hurwitz novel), a thriller novel by Gregg Hurwitz in 2006
- Trouble Shooter, a 1991 video game
- The Trouble Shooter, a 1924 American Western silent film in 1924
- Troubleshooter, characters in Paranoia (role-playing game) (1984 to 2017)

== See also ==
- Wikipedia:Troubleshooting
