= Antihero (Hurwitz novel) =

2026 novel by Gregg Hurwitz

- First edition
- Author: Gregg Hurwitz
- Language: English
- Series: Orphan X
- Release number: 11
- Genre: Thriller
- Publisher: Minotaur Books
- Publication date: February 10, 2026
- Publication place: United States
- Media type: Print (hardcover and paperback)
- Pages: 416
- ISBN: 978-1-250-87177-0
- OCLC: 1538593637
- Dewey Decimal: 813/.54
- Preceded by: Nemesis

Antihero is a thriller novel written by American author Gregg Hurwitz. It was Hurwitz's eleventh book in the Orphan X series, preceded by Nemesis.

In the novel, Evan Smoak searches for kidnapped Anca and must balance vengeance with mercy. The book was released on February 10, 2026, by Minotaur Books.

== Plot ==
Evan Smoak, formerly Orphan X and now the Nowhere Man, saves fifteen-year-old Lesandro Candella from five Trinitarios gang members in East Los Angeles. Mistaken for another boy, Lesandro has lost his left forearm and a finger. Evan defeats all five attackers.

In New York, Anca Dumitrescu, a Romanian-American social services director with epilepsy, is abducted from the subway. Witness Monica goes to Tartarus, the Hamptons estate of billionaire Luke Devine, who blackmails politicians. During a manic episode, Devine calls Evan's emergency line.

Evan travels to Tartarus with hacker Joey Morales. He persuades Devine to surrender control of his operations, and gains access to Devine's computer system. Joey identifies Anca through Monica's account and camera footage.

Evan finds Anca in a Harlem apartment, injured and drugged, with a slur on her cheek. She recalls masked men and abuse. After escaping, she walks to her Bronx home, where Evan finds her collapsed. In a hospital tests confirm severe injuries, fentanyl, and gang rape. Anca refuses Evan's offer to kill her attackers, saying they must answer to God.

Evan assigns Candy McClure, Orphan V, to guard Anca. Evan traces the apartment payment to Manny Llorente, a pornography distributor who edits recordings for the White On Posse, four men who film assaults. Evan obtains a flash drive of Anca's assault and agrees with Secret Service deputy director Naomi Templeton to identify offenders for prosecution.

The recording overwhelms Evan, who tells Joey to erase every online copy. The White On Posse comprises Taswell Kinley, Brandon Burke, Finley Jacowski, and Michael Macmanus. Their associate Dirty Pete becomes their hired attacker, while they groom student Blanca for assault.

Evan enters RedLite, the platform distributing the recordings, posing as a blogger. He plants infected flash drives, enabling Joey's software to destroy its databases. Ally Aragón Urrea helps Evan recognize his overprotectiveness toward Joey.

After Anca gives prosecutors her statement, Pete's twelve-year-old son lures Evan at Glass Bottle Beach and injects him with fentanyl. Evan defeats three attackers before collapsing. Anca protects him and incapacitates Pete. Evan treats his chest injury at a gas station.

Joey identifies two offenders through biometric evidence. Evan gets the remaining names from Finn-Finn and Big Mikey, then arrives at B-Roll's apartment before Blanca's assault begins. He escorts her out and restrains Burke for Templeton, all four members are arrested.

District attorney Mia Hall helps Evan accept that caring means allowing others independence. He admits to Joey that Anca's recording frightened him and adopts a commandment: "If you feel more, you have to feel more." Devine proposes directing RedLite settlement funds to victims. Evan requests a prosthetic arm for Lesandro, returns the black box, and gives Devine his first name. On Aragón's jet home, Evan extends his limbs toward the four cardinal directions, forming an X.

== Reception ==
Antihero received positive reviews from critics, with praise for its fast-paced action, character development, and exploration of Evan Smoak's moral code. Kirkus Reviews described it as a dynamic thriller, highlighting Hurwitz's continuing development of the series and its returning characters.

Library Journal characterized the novel as "A relentless battle between vengeance and virtue," while Booklist called it "A must-read." The Real Book Spy also praised the novel's action, emotional depth, and examination of justice and mercy.
