= Castle Heights, Los Angeles =

Castle Heights
- Neighborhood of Los Angeles
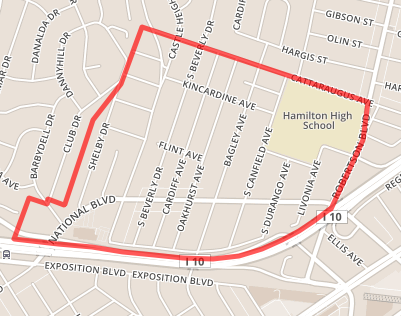
- Map showing the boundaries of Castle Heights

- Location within Westside
- Coordinates: 34.033620°N 118.396043°W
- Country: United States
- State: California
- County: Los Angeles
- City: Los Angeles
- Time zone: Pacific
- Website: www.chnapalms.wordpress.com

Castle Heights is a neighborhood on the Westside of the city of Los Angeles, California.

Founded in 1922, the neighborhood contains roughly 900 single-family residences, along with multi-family apartments and condominiums with a limited amount of commercial property.

== Geography ==
The neighborhood is bounded by Cheviot Hills to the west, Beverlywood to the north, and the Santa Monica Freeway to the south and east.

The neighborhood's multi-family housing is concentrated along the southern half of the neighborhood, while its commercial buildings are concentrated along National Boulevard between the Santa Monica Freeway and Castle Heights Avenue, and along South Robertson Boulevard.

== History ==
Castle Heights was established in 1922, and many of the single family residences date from the 1920s to the 1940s and were built in the Spanish Revival style. The last tract of homes was completed in 1962, and many of the multi-family buildings date from around that time.

The second phase of the Expo Line runs adjacent to the neighborhood, along the Santa Monica Freeway, and the Palms Station is located at the border of Castle Heights and Palms.

Castle Heights has historically been less affluent than the surrounding neighborhoods of Cheviot Hills and Beverlywood. Many of the residents are employees at local movie studios, as the neighborhood is a short drive from both Fox Studios and Sony Studios.

== Government and Infrastructure ==
=== Police service ===
The Los Angeles Police Department operates the West Los Angeles Community Police Station at 1663 Butler Avenue, 90025, serving the neighborhood.

=== Education ===
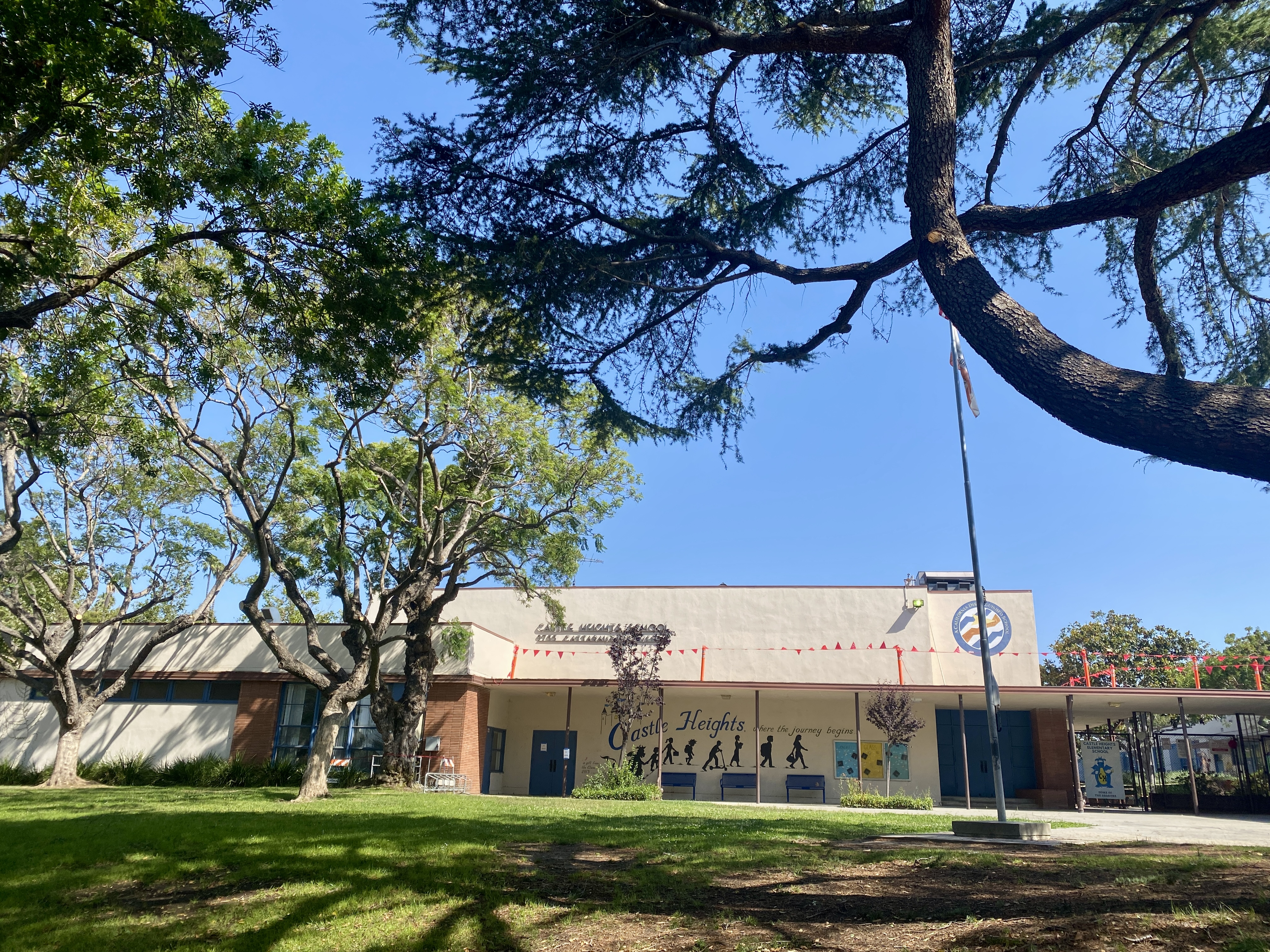
Castle Heights Elementary School (2024)

The schools within Castle Heights are as follows:

- Castle Heights Elementary School, 9755 Cattaraugus Avenue
- Alexander Hamilton High School, 2955 South Robertson Boulevard

=== Parks and recreation ===
There are no parks in Castle Heights, but Irvine Schachter Park and Woodbine Park are both located just a few blocks from the neighborhood.

=== Transportation ===
I-10 skirts the southern edge of the neighborhood and can be accessed from Manning Avenue. Palms Station on the Metro E Line also lies just outside Castle Heights.

== See also ==
- Castle Heights
- Los Angeles, California
- List of districts and neighborhoods of Los Angeles
