= Gregg Hurwitz =

American novelist, screenwriter and comic book writer (born 1973)

- Born: Gregg Andrew Hurwitz; August 12, 1973 (age 53); San Francisco County, California, U.S.
- Education: Harvard University (BA); Trinity College, Oxford (MPhil)
- Occupations: Novelist; comic book writer
- Children: 2
- Writing career
- Genre: Thriller
- Notable works: Orphan X; Tell No Lies; Don't Look Back
- Website: www.gregghurwitz.net

Gregg Andrew Hurwitz (born August 12, 1973) is an American novelist, screenwriter, and comic book writer. Most of his novels are in the thriller fiction genre. His script writing work includes a film adaptation of his book Orphan X, a TV adaptation of Joby Warrick's Black Flags: The Rise of ISIS, and a screenplay for the 2017 film The Book of Henry. He also has written comic books for publishers such as DC Comics and Marvel Comics.

== Early life ==
Hurwitz grew up in the San Francisco Bay Area, the son of a physician father from Boston and a mother from New York who came from a family of attorneys. His great-grandparents were Jewish immigrants from the Pale of Settlement in the Russian Empire, and he was raised in a secular household he has described as coming from "a long line of Jewish, kind-of atheist, socialists"; one of his great-grandparents worked with Samuel Gompers of the American Federation of Labor. He was not allowed to watch television as a child except for Boston Red Sox games, and grew up reading and spending time in libraries. He decided he wanted to be a writer at an early age, writing and illustrating mystery stories in crayon as early as the fourth grade. His parents had expected him to become an English professor, but came to support his writing as his commitment became clear.

He graduated from Bellarmine College Preparatory in San Jose, California. While completing a Bachelor of Arts degree from Harvard University (1995) and a master's from Trinity College, Oxford, in Shakespearean tragedy (1996), he wrote his first novel, The Tower, which he began at age 19 as an undergraduate at Oxford. At Harvard, he was a student of psychologist Jordan Peterson, who influenced his writing. He was the undergraduate scholar-athlete of the year at Harvard for pole vaulting and played college soccer in England, where he was a Knox Fellow.

== Career ==
Hurwitz is the author of The Tower, Minutes to Burn, Do No Harm, The Kill Clause, The Program, Troubleshooter, Last Shot, The Crime Writer, Trust No One, Don't Look Back, and Orphan X. His books have been shortlisted for best novel of the year by the International Thriller Writers, nominated for the CWA Ian Fleming Steel Dagger, chosen as feature selections for four major literary book clubs, honored as Book Sense Picks, and translated into 28 languages.

He wrote the original screenplay for the film The Book of Henry (2017), directed by Colin Trevorrow for Sidney Kimmel Entertainment, and filmed in New York.

His 2016 novel Orphan X was picked up by Warner Bros. with Bradley Cooper to direct. Hurwitz will write the screenplay adaptation. Hurwitz has written Wolverine, The Punisher, and Foolkiller for Marvel Comics, and published numerous academic articles on Shakespeare. He has taught fiction writing in the USC English Department, and guest lectured for UCLA and Harvard. He also has written and produced season two of the TV show V.

He became the writer of Batman: The Dark Knight for DC Comics in 2012.

== Personal life ==
Hurwitz lives in Los Angeles. He is married and has two daughters.

== Published works ==
=== Novels ===
==== Orphan X series ====
1. Orphan X, January 2016
2. The Nowhere Man, January 2017
3. Hellbent, January 2018
4. Out of the Dark, January 2019
5. Into the Fire, January 2020
6. Prodigal Son, January 2021
7. Dark Horse, February 2022
8. The Last Orphan, February 2023
9. Lone Wolf, February 2024
10. Nemesis, February 2025
11. Antihero, February 2026
12. Last Man Standing, February 2027

===== Orphan X short stories =====
- "Buy a Bullet", (Book 1.5) October 2016
- "The Intern", (Book 3.5) December 2018
- "The List", (Book 5.5) August 2020
- "The Recital", (Book 8.5) November 2023
- "The Code", (Book 10.5) September 2025

==== The Rains Brothers ====
1. The Rains, October 2016
2. Last Chance, October 2017

==== Tim Rackley ====
1. The Kill Clause, August 2003
2. The Program, August 2004
3. Troubleshooter, August 2005
4. Last Shot, August 2006

==== Stand-alones ====
- The Tower, April 1999
- Minutes to Burn, July 2001
- Do No Harm, July 2002
- The Crime Writer (also known as I See You), July 2007
- Trust No One (UK title as We Know), June 2009
- They're Watching (UK title as Or She Dies), July 2010
- You're Next, July 2011
- The Survivor, July 2012
- Tell No Lies, August 2013
- Don't Look Back, August 2014

=== Comic books ===
==== DC Comics ====
- Batman: The Dark Knight #10–29, 0, Annual #1, 2012–2014
- Detective Comics #0, 27, 2012–2014
- Penguin: Pain and Prejudice #1–5, 2011–2012

==== Marvel Comics ====
- Foolkiller vol. 2 #1–5, 2007
- Foolkiller: White Angels #1–5, 2008–2009
- New Avengers #55, 2009
- Punisher vol. 7 #61–65, 75, 2008–2009
- The Savage Axe of Ares #1, 2011
- Shadowland: Moon Knight #1–3, 2010
- The Vengeance of Moon Knight #1–10, 2009–2010
- Wolverine Annual #1, 2007
- Wolverine: Flies to a Spider #1, 2009
- Wolverine: Switchback #1, 2009
- X-Men Forever #4, 2009

== Filmography ==
Television

Year	Title	Notes
2010–2011	V	Seven episodes; Also consulting producer
2016	Queen of the South	Episode "Billete de Magia"

Film

Year	Title	Writer	Co-Producer
2017	The Book of Henry	Yes	Yes
2021	Sweet Girl	Yes	Yes
