= Into the Fire (Hurwitz novel) =

2020 novel by Gregg Hurwitz

- First edition
- Author: Gregg Hurwitz
- Language: English
- Series: Orphan X
- Release number: 5
- Genre: Thriller
- Publisher: Minotaur Books
- Publication date: January 28, 2020
- Publication place: United States
- Media type: Print (hardcover and paperback)
- Pages: 388
- ISBN: 978-1-250-12045-8
- OCLC: 1423726402
- Dewey Decimal: 813/.54
- LC Class: PS3558.U695 I58 2020
- Preceded by: Out of the Dark
- Followed by: Prodigal Son

Into the Fire is a thriller novel written by American author Gregg Hurwitz. It was Hurwitz's fifth book in the Orphan X series, preceded by Out of the Dark, and was followed by Prodigal Son.

In the novel, Evan Smoak, a former government assassin, helps desperate Max Merriweather protect a mysterious key. The book was released on January 28, 2020, by Minotaur Books.

== Plot ==
Evan Smoak has lived under two identities for years. Recruited as a child into a covert assassin program, he escaped and became the Nowhere Man, helping people with nowhere else to turn. He considers leaving that life behind, but agrees to answer one more request before choosing a future.

Max Merriweather contacts him after his cousin Grant is murdered. Grant, a forensic accountant, left Max an envelope for a newspaper reporter if anything happened to him. The reporter has vanished, and Max's home has been searched. The envelope holds a key to digital records. Max is estranged from Violet, the woman he loves. Evan protects him.

Grant's files concern money laundering. Joey Morales, a teenage computer prodigy Evan trained, helps trace payments through criminal businesses and dishonest Los Angeles police officers. Tommy Stojack, a gunsmith, assists. The men sent after Max answer to Alexan Petro, a crime boss. An attack leaves Evan concussed; his vision falters, but he continues.

Evan's inquiries expose detectives Nuñez and Brust, who use their badges to threaten Max and conceal evidence. The records point beyond Petro to Benjamin Bedrosov, a businessman who commands a criminal operation behind a respectable image. Evan realizes Petro's death will not end the threat.

Evan accepts arrest and enters prison under an assumed identity to get near Bedrosov. His concussion leaves him vulnerable among inmates, while Bedrosov's men arrange attacks. Joey assists from outside and watches for signs that Evan's identity has been exposed. Evan attacks Bedrosov, then escapes badly shaken.

Max learns Grant was not an innocent accountant exposing wrongdoing. He had joined that scheme and passed damaging records to people he feared. Max mourns his cousin and faces his separation from Violet, including sacrifices made when she needed treatment. Evan helps him accept that survival cannot restore what was lost, but Max can still choose what comes next.

Evan meets Stella, nicknamed Steel Woman, and men threatened by the evidence. Their response shows misconduct reaches civic offices. Evan survives another attempt on his life, but his injuries force him to rest. He and Mia Hall, the assistant district attorney he has grown close to, discuss her son Peter and Evan's dangerous existence. Mia cares for him, but cannot promise their lives will fit together.

Evan has finished the assignment he called his last, yet retirement remains uncertain. The president offers him a pardon if he gives up private missions and stops being the Nowhere Man. Evan weighs this against his attachment to Mia and Joey. He visits Joey, then drives into the Mojave Desert to speak with the president. At his building, he finds residents gathered, but Mia is absent. An international call arrives from his mother, a woman he never knew. Her voice opens a new chapter in Evan's life.

== Reception ==
Into the Fire received positive reviews from critics. Kirkus Reviews praised the novel for its successive crises and Evan Smoak's struggle to leave his former life behind.

Publishers Weekly praised Hurwitz's combination of continuous action and character development, calling it a "terrific tale". Library Journal awarded the novel a starred review, describing it as an exceptional installment in the Orphan X series.
