= Penguin: Pain and Prejudice =

Comic book series by Gregg Hurwitz

- Trade paperback cover.

Publication information
- Publisher: DC Comics
- Schedule: Monthly
- Format: Limited series
- Publication date: December 2011 – April 2012
- No. of issues: 5
- Main character(s): Penguin; Batman

Creative team
- Written by: Gregg Hurwitz
- Artist: Symon Kudranski
- Letterer: Rob Leigh
- Colorist: John Kalisz

Collected editions
- Trade paperback: ISBN 978-1401237325

Penguin: Pain and Prejudice is a comic book limited series focusing on the Batman villain Penguin, written by Gregg Hurwitz and published by the publishing company DC Comics.

== Reception ==
IGN rated its individual issues between 8.0 and 9.0 out of 10.
