= Lone Wolf (Hurwitz novel) =

2024 novel by Gregg Hurwitz

- First edition
- Author: Gregg Hurwitz
- Language: English
- Series: Orphan X
- Release number: 9
- Genre: Thriller
- Publisher: Minotaur Books
- Publication date: February 13, 2024
- Publication place: United States
- Media type: Print (hardcover and paperback)
- Pages: 400
- ISBN: 978-1-250-87173-2
- OCLC: 1427670846
- Dewey Decimal: 813/.54
- LC Class: PS3558.U695 L66 2024
- Preceded by: The Last Orphan
- Followed by: Nemesis

Lone Wolf is a thriller novel written by American author Gregg Hurwitz. It was Hurwitz's ninth book in the Orphan X series, preceded by The Last Orphan, and was followed by Nemesis.

In the novel, Evan Smoak searches for his niece's missing dog, uncovering an assassin known as Wolf. The book was released on February 13, 2024, by Minotaur Books.

== Plot ==
Evan Smoak awakens badly injured in remote Texas, beyond his RoamZone tracker's range. After contacting hacker Joey Morales, he hears from Sofia Duran, daughter of his half-brother Andre. Her dog, Loco, is missing. Sofia, only eleven, has no one else she trusts with this request. Sofia's distress persuades him to help.

Meanwhile, assassin Karissa Lopatina, called the Wolf, kills software manager Anwuli Okonkwo, making it appear accidental. She then murders Dr. Benjamin Hill, a specialist at Solventry. Evan follows Loco to Hill's house. Hill's seventeen-year-old daughter, Jayla, arrives. Karissa uses her to escape. Evan saves Jayla from suffocation, but damages her vocal cords in the struggle. The Wolf escapes missing part of an ear.

Forger Melinda Truong helps Evan identify Karissa through DNA. He and Joey learn Hill developed an advanced computer system for Solventry, it creates synthetic faces and voices, including fabricated videos hard to distinguish from authentic recordings. The executives covet the invention, and Evan suspects Hill was killed over ownership.

Using a false academic identity, Evan meets executives at Solventry and Youtopia. Joey accesses Solventry's systems while Evan searches for Karissa, who intends to kill Jayla. Evan locates Nathan Friedhoff, whose payments funded several murders. After Friedhoff dies, Evan and Joey learn other intended victims may remain.

Evan visits Andre, his recently discovered half-brother, and finds him drinking heavily. Evan cannot repair his brother's life, but makes sure he is safe. His concern for Sofia grows as he continues searching for Loco, despite a killer with abilities like his own.

Evan learns Solventry chief Allman used predictive software to identify employees regarded as threats. Hill's research has been taken, leaving a hard drive containing a functioning deepfake system. It can fabricate recordings of people saying or doing things they never did. Evan fears it could enable fraud and public manipulation, while restricting it leaves control with executives.

Evan and Karissa meet while pursuing Allman. Karissa fires first, damaging Evan's equipment, but he wounds her fatally. As she dies, she asks him to hold her, and he grants her request. At Allman's home, Evan finds a frail, troubled man. He kills Allman, then becomes physically sick.

Jayla recovers at her aunt's home. Joey brings her a device made by her father that restores her speech through a synthesized version of her voice. Evan urges her to help others. On Thanksgiving, he returns Loco to Sofia. Andre is missing again, but Evan accepts the family's dinner invitation rather than retreating into solitude.

At Joey's apartment, Evan and Joey debate what to do with Hill's files. Joey argues withholding the system will not stop others from developing similar technology. They decide public access may help ordinary people expose fabricated media. Together, they upload the files, accepting uncertain results.

== Reception ==
Lone Wolf received positive reviews from several publications. Kirkus Reviews praised the novel as "Another crackling caper for the solitary Orphan X," highlighting its fast-moving plot, character development, gritty action sequences and humor.

Publishers Weekly offered a more critical assessment, describing the plot as dated and arguing that the additional humor and exploration of Evan Smoak's family relationships were insufficient to improve the story. The review concluded that the series appeared to be running out of steam.
