= Nemesis (Hurwitz novel) =

2025 novel by Gregg Hurwitz

- First edition
- Author: Gregg Hurwitz
- Language: English
- Series: Orphan X
- Release number: 10
- Genre: Thriller
- Publisher: Minotaur Books
- Publication date: February 11, 2025
- Publication place: United States
- Media type: Print (hardcover and paperback)
- Pages: 453
- ISBN: 978-1-250-87174-9
- OCLC: 1440044575
- Dewey Decimal: 813/.54
- LC Class: PS3558.U695 N46 2025
- Preceded by: Lone Wolf
- Followed by: Antihero

Nemesis is a thriller novel written by American author Gregg Hurwitz. It was Hurwitz's tenth book in the Orphan X series, preceded by Lone Wolf and followed by Antihero.

In the novel, Evan Smoak confronts his closest friend Tommy Stojack after discovering that he supplied weapons to the assassin known as the Wolf. The book was released on February 11, 2025, by Minotaur Books.

== Plot ==
Fifteen years earlier, Evan Smoak meets gunsmith Tommy Stojack at a Las Vegas arms convention. Tommy helps Kurdish fighter Deijly after a dispute with former green beret Robbie Olson. She gives them a coin inscribed "No Greater Friend" and "No Worse Enemy." Tommy builds Evan's weapons, and Evan, once a state assassin known as Orphan X, regards him as his closest friend.

Evan now operates as the Nowhere Man. In Los Angeles, he rescues a girl from an organ-harvesting operation. Neva Alonso sought help through Jayla Hill, whom Evan had saved. Joey Morales finds evidence that Tommy supplied weapons to the Wolf, an assassin who attacked Evan and nearly killed Jayla. Evan regards Tommy's sale as a breach of his code against allowing an innocent person to die.

Evan visits Tommy's armory outside Las Vegas and demands an explanation. Tommy argues that loyalty to allies matters more than Evan's code. Evan rejects his answer and leaves his half of the coin behind. The next morning, armed men attack him there. Evan survives and suspects Tommy arranged his death. Their commander, Janus, escapes.

Tommy has gone to Calvary after a plea from Delmont "Hick" Hickenlooper Jr., son of a deceased military friend. Hick is hiding with the Calvary Liberty Guard, a white-supremacist militia. Red Hildebrandt drove a truck into a quinceañera at Calvary Park. The three members of the Martinez and Escareño families died, including eight-year-old Gabriel Martinez. Hick held Gabriel as he died. Red disposed of the body, while Sheriff Grady Joy hid evidence.

Joey locates Tommy in Calvary, and Evan follows. He meets Gabriel's parents, Lidia and Santiago, and vows to seek justice. At the militia's ranch, Evan and Tommy learn Janus sent the Las Vegas attackers. Janus is a trafficker and arms dealer whom Tommy refused to supply. They agree to meet at Dawnfall, an abandoned Western film town, though Tommy insists on deciding Hick's fate.

Janus sends the Four Horsemen, hired killers, after them. Evan and Tommy put aside their feud to repel the attack. Red confronts Evan and is killed. In a ruined bowling alley, Hick admits his part in Gabriel's death and expresses remorse. Tommy begs Evan to spare him, remembers the lessons of his former handler Jack Johns, Evan lowers his gun. Tommy takes Hick to Chief Deputy Ronny Ratliff, who exposes Joy's cover-up. Hick confesses and must answer in court.

Evan confronts Janus at his fortified compound, marks him with the Orphan insignia, and orders him to end his criminal operation and leave Tommy alone. Evan gives evidence to federal authorities. On New Year's morning, he returns to Tommy's armory and finds his friend dead at his bench from heart failure. Evan is left with the divided coin and memories of a friendship that ended without reconciliation.

== Reception ==
Nemesis received a positive review from Kirkus Reviews, which praised Hurwitz's writing, dialogue, action and character development. The publication described the tenth Orphan X installment as "another wildly inventive episode" and welcomed the return of several familiar characters.

Publishers Weekly offered a more mixed assessment, describing the novel as offering "more of the same—for better and worse." The review criticized its familiar storyline and repetitive elements while discussing Evan Smoak's deteriorating friendship with Tommy Stojack.
