= The Last Orphan =

2023 novel by Gregg Hurwitz

- First edition
- Author: Gregg Hurwitz
- Language: English
- Series: Orphan X
- Release number: 8
- Genre: Thriller
- Publisher: Minotaur Books
- Publication date: February 14, 2023
- Publication place: United States
- Media type: Print (hardcover and paperback)
- Pages: 352
- ISBN: 978-1-250-25232-6
- OCLC: 1376866912
- Dewey Decimal: 813/.54
- LC Class: PS3558.U695L36 2023
- Preceded by: Dark Horse
- Followed by: Lone Wolf

The Last Orphan is a thriller novel written by American author Gregg Hurwitz. It was Hurwitz's eighth book in the Orphan X series, preceded by Dark Horse, and was followed by Lone Wolf.

In the novel, Evan Smoak is captured and offered freedom in exchange for assassinating billionaire Luke Devine. The book was released on February 14, 2023, by Minotaur Books.

== Plot ==
At a Labor Day party at Tartarus, a Hamptons mansion, theater technician Johnny Seabrook, 22-year-old, is sexually assaulted by a morning-show anchor. He opens a scarlet door upstairs. A gunman shoots him and cuts his throat.

Evan Smoak was taken from foster care at twelve and trained as a state assassin through the Orphan Program. Jack Johns taught him ten rules. After leaving state service, Evan became the Nowhere Man, aiding vulnerable people through an untraceable phone number. Despite a presidential pardon, he secretly resumed helping them.

His sixteen-year-old hacker protégé, Joey Morales, traces his biological father, Jacob Baridon, a rodeo cowboy near Blessing, Texas. Evan orders her to stop. District attorney Mia Hall awakens from a coma. Evan visits her at Cedars-Sinai but enters a Secret Service trap. He fights agents, then surrenders to Special Agent Naomi Templeton to protect a civilian.

Templeton arranges a call with President Victoria Donahue-Carr, who voids Evan's pardon and threatens execution unless he accepts an assignment against Luke Devine. Devine uses parties to compromise wealthy guests; blackmail files give him leverage over two senators. Evan agrees to assess Devine. Former Orphan operative Candy McClure helps him escape after a guard steals his DNA.

Joey identifies Devine's guards as marines led by Derek Tenpenny. Evan persuades Devine's former girlfriend to leave an eleventh-floor ledge. She sends a video from Ruby Anne Seabrook, Johnny's nineteen-year-old sister, asking for help.

Ruby shows Evan a threatening voicemail. Devine's men kill an associate of Angela Buford, a sex worker also killed. A sketch marks Ruby as their next target. Evan confirms Angela's tie to Tartarus and moves the Seabrooks to safety. Candy guards them after he kills a marine at their former home.

At Tartarus's Halloween gala, Devine recognizes Evan as the Nowhere Man and proposes an alliance in a scarlet room with monitoring equipment. On Joey's birthday, Evan tries to reconcile by cooking military rations and giving her a diamond necklace once owned by a Persian monarch. Their renewed bond follows an argument about Evan's emotional distance and Joey's resentment over the neglect of foster children. Joey hacks Devine's network and finds erased Labor Day footage. Evan takes a copy from Tenpenny's condominium. It shows Tenpenny taking Angela into the scarlet room; Johnny entered and saw Devine's screens. Tenpenny killed Angela and chased Johnny. Devine had not ordered or known about either killing.

Evan, Joey, and Candy attack Tartarus. Joey sends false police alarms as Candy distracts guards. Evan kills Devine's marines, wounds Rathsberger, and plants incriminating items in Tenpenny's luggage at Dubai airport, ensuring his arrest. Evan spares Devine, who had not ordered Johnny's murder, but kills Rathsberger as he crawls toward his gun. President Donahue-Carr is unhappy that Devine remains alive. He warns the president, returns to Wellesley, and promises Ruby help if threats resume.

Flying to Texas, Evan realizes Blessing is four hours away. He finds an abandoned trailer, sees a whiskered face through a truck's window, then turns around. He returns to the trailer, climbs its splintered porch, and knocks.

== Reception ==
The Last Orphan received a starred review from Kirkus Reviews praised the novel's fast-paced action, gritty atmosphere, witty dialogue, and humor, describing it as a thriller that felt like a possible series finale.

Publishers Weekly praised the action-packed story and compared Evan Smoak to Jason Bourne, but noted that the numerous plot contrivances demanded considerable suspension of disbelief from readers.
