= You're Next (novel) =

2010 novel by Gregg Hurwitz

- Author: Gregg Hurwitz
- Language: English
- Genre: Fiction
- Publisher: Sphere
- Publication date: November 2010
- Pages: 448
- ISBN: 9780751542110

You're Next is a 2010 thriller novel written by Gregg Hurwitz. It was his 11th novel.

== Plot ==
The book centres around the character Mike Wingate - a property developer. He has been raised in foster care after being abandoned by his father at four. He presently has a wife and an 8-year-old daughter, has his construction company which is about to finish a green housing development project and be honoured by the Governor for environmental building practices. But things go quickly wrong when he meets a crippled stranger at a party. Things quickly escalate from him receiving threats to attacks - one of which nearly kills his wife. When he reports them to the police, they seem more interested in Mike's past than in protecting him.

With his family in mortal danger Mike turns to Shep - a dangerous man. He knows Shep from his days in foster care and he is the only friend Mike has. Together they try and protect Mike's family from the hidden men and uncover why suddenly both these hidden strangers and the police are after him.

== Reception ==
Josh Emmons of People gave the book 3.5 stars, writing, "Hurwitz's latest thriller moves fast enough to glide over a few plot holes and provides a fun tour of green architecture and the Indian casino business along the way." Deseret News reviewer Susie Boyce called the book "beautifully written, heartbreaking and emotionally riveting" as well as "physically and emotionally exhausting". Finding the book to be "downright scary", Sunday Herald Sun's Glenn Fisher thought that "Hurwitz may not have the highest profile in the world of crime writing, but he should after this."

Jeff Ayers of the Associated Press found the book to be "a chilling look at one man's efforts to save his family from his haunted past" and "irresistible". David Pitt, a reviewer for Booklist, called You're Next "another excellent performance, keeping Mike (and the reader) on edge". The Winnipeg Free Press's David Pitt wrote that the book was a "sharply plotted thrille[r] with well-drawn characters". The Courier-Mail writer Bruce McMahon said the plot "roll[s] at full throttle" through its "well-drawn and always interesting characters".
