= The Nowhere Man (Hurwitz novel) =

2017 novel by Gregg Hurwitz

- First edition
- Author: Gregg Hurwitz
- Language: English
- Series: Orphan X
- Release number: 2
- Genre: Thriller
- Publisher: Minotaur Books
- Publication date: January 17, 2017
- Publication place: United States
- Media type: Print (hardcover and paperback)
- Pages: 368
- ISBN: 978-0-250-06785-5
- OCLC: 961802110
- Dewey Decimal: 813/.54
- LC Class: PS3558.U695 N69 2017
- Preceded by: Orphan X
- Followed by: Hellbent

The Nowhere Man is a thriller novel written by Gregg Hurwitz. It was Hurwitz's second book in the Orphan X series, preceded by Orphan X, and was followed by Hellbent.

In the novel, Evan Smoak, is kidnapped and held captive in a remote estate, forcing him to use all his skills to escape while still trying to help those who reach out to him for protection. The book was released on January 17, 2017, by Minotaur Books.

== Plot ==
Evan Smoak, once known as Orphan X, was taken from a children's home and trained by a secret program. He becomes the Nowhere Man, helping people with nowhere else to turn. Each person receives one instruction: pass his number to someone needing protection. Answering calls puts Evan's life at risk.

Evan recently rescued Anna Rezian from a human trafficking operation. He learns another girl has been placed aboard a cargo ship for sale. Before he can reach it, armed men intercept him, drug him, and take him away. Anna is safe, but the other child remains aboard.

Evan awakens inside a locked room at a mountain estate owned by René Peter Cassaroy, a criminal. René knows Evan can access a Swiss bank account holding twenty-seven million dollars. He uses abuse to demand the account credentials, caring little about Evan's former service.

The estate has armed guards, trained dogs, two snipers, and Dex, a formidable enforcer. René's men beat Evan, but he refuses to disclose his banking credentials. He studies his surroundings and searches for an exit. Every attempt brings tighter supervision, but he resists.

Evan draws endurance from lessons taught by Jack Johns, his childhood mentor. Jack taught him to withstand pain, remain alert, and assess people around him. Without weapons, money, or trusted allies, Evan must rely on that instruction to survive.

René's demand for money conceals another purpose. He seeks to extend his lifespan through an experimental treatment using blood from kidnapped young men. The several boys are held at his estate. Evan knows escape alone would leave them exposed to abuse, giving him another reason to resist.

Meanwhile, Candy McClure, known as Orphan V, searches for Evan on behalf of the Orphan Program. She is paired with Ben Jaggers, called Orphan M. When an innocent girl is killed during their assignment, Candy witnesses Ben's cruelty and questions those issuing their orders.

During captivity, Evan recalls calls from a frightened boy and a girl who asked his service for help. He must escape, find both children, and stop them from being sold or killed. The girl aboard the freighter remains a concern: he has not kept his promise to Anna.

René prepares to sell Evan to wealthy bidders. Before the sale, men from Evan's former life arrive to claim him, bringing René's guards into a fight with Orphan operatives. Evan turns his knowledge of the estate against its owner. An ally from his past helps him escape.

Once free, Evan finds the frightened children and saves them. Candy's doubts about Ben and her superiors leave open the possibility that she may reject their orders. Evan remains a target, but refuses to abandon people who need help. He continues as the Nowhere Man, assisting those without another source of protection.

== Reception ==
The Nowhere Man received positive reviews from critics, with particular praise for its fast-paced action, engaging characters, and suspenseful plot. Publishers Weekly awarded the novel a starred review, describing it as a standout thriller and praising Gregg Hurwitz's sympathetic characters and ability to maintain suspense throughout the story.

Booklist also awarded the novel a starred review, calling it an improvement over its predecessor and praising its compelling antagonist and increasing tension. Kirkus Reviews noted its energetic action and violence, recommending it to readers who enjoy action-oriented thrillers.
