= Troubleshooter (Hurwitz novel) =

2006 novel by Gregg Hurwitz

- Author: Gregg Hurwitz
- Language: English
- Series: Tim Rackley
- Genre: Fiction
- Publisher: HarperCollins
- Publication date: August 30, 2006
- Pages: 400
- ISBN: 9780061754845
- OCLC: 877982933
- Preceded by: The Program
- Followed by: Lastshot
- Website: Tim Rackley Series

Troubleshooter is a 2006 thriller fiction novel written by Gregg Hurwitz. It is the third of the 4-part series named "Tim Rackley" from the author.

The follow-up book, the last of the series, Last Shot was published in September 2007.

== Dramatisation ==
In 2012, it was reported that TNT and Shawn Ryan were working with the author to dramatise the series.
