= Hellbent (Hurwitz novel) =

2018 novel by Gregg Hurwitz

- First edition
- Author: Gregg Hurwitz
- Language: English
- Series: Orphan X
- Release number: 3
- Genre: Thriller
- Publisher: Minotaur Books
- Publication date: January 30, 2018
- Publication place: United States
- Media type: Print (hardcover and paperback)
- Pages: 406
- ISBN: 978-1-250-11917-9
- OCLC: 983823783
- Dewey Decimal: 813/.54
- LC Class: PS3558.U695 H45 2018
- Preceded by: The Nowhere Man
- Followed by: Out of the Dark

Hellbent is a thriller novel written by American author Gregg Hurwitz. It was Hurwitz's third book in the Orphan X series, preceded by The Nowhere Man, and was followed by Out of the Dark.

In the novel, Evan Smoak, the legendary former government assassin, finds himself on a personal mission to protect the daughter of his murdered mentor, Jack Johns. The book was released on January 30, 2018, by Minotaur Books.

== Plot ==
Jack Johns contacts Evan Smoak through his private line while fleeing men employed by Charles Van Sciver, the new director of the Orphan Program. Jack says he loves Evan, asks forgiveness, and assigns him one task: retrieve a package. Soon afterward, Jack's helicopter is destroyed. Evan watches a recording of his death and promises retaliation.

Evan, once known as Orphan X, trained from childhood as an assassin, has become the Nowhere Man, an anonymous helper who answers desperate calls. The package is Joey Morales, a sixteen-year-old girl Jack sheltered after her escape from the Orphan Program; Jack had kept her hidden, the gifted at mathematics and computer hacking, Joey has combat instruction. She attacks Evan, blaming him for Jack's death, but accepts that Jack wanted her protected.

Van Sciver sends ex-Orphans and hired contractors to kill them. Evan and Joey flee across the United States, evading armed pursuers. Joey uses computer knowledge to aid their escape. Evan also receives a call from a boy threatened with recruitment by a criminal gang. He refuses to ignore the plea.

Van Sciver orders deaths of people tied to the Orphan Program. His team includes Lyle, Enzo, and Candy McClure. Evan obtains a concealed drive containing records Jack collected. The files describe children recruited into the program and an order to destroy it, approved by senior officials. Evan realizes killing Van Sciver may not end the threat.

Joey struggles with memories of abuse under Van Sciver. Evan teaches restraint and urges her to spare innocent people. Joey insists on helping stop Van Sciver. A coded entry in Van Sciver's notebook, "6-1414 Dark Road 32," points to President Bennett and the White House. Evan enlists Tommy Stojack. Joey joins them, and they lure Van Sciver to a Las Vegas construction site.

Van Sciver arrives with ex-Secret Service agents and armed contractors. The gunfire traps Evan beside his vehicle. Joey turns back to help Evan and is shot in the leg. Evan wounds Van Sciver but abandons an opportunity to kill him when he sees Joey bleeding. He calls Tommy for medical aid. Candy approaches with a gun, then retreats.

Van Sciver survives and is taken to intensive care. Evan enters his hospital room, confronts him over Jack's murder, and kills him. Joey receives a new identity, Vera, and a fresh start at a school in Switzerland. Evan arranges her financial security.

Evan returns to Los Angeles, pays the Orellana family's debts anonymously. He meets Mia, but they do not reunite. At his apartment, a message bearing Van Sciver's name contains another Dark Road reference, tied to a covert operation from nearly twenty years earlier. Evan calls President Bennett, saying he knows of their shared past and intends to learn what happened himself.

== Reception ==
Hellbent was well received by critics, including a starred review from Booklist, whose David Pitt claimed Hellbent called it "a great novel, perhaps the darkest in the series so far". Kirkus Reviews said the novel is "as well-done as the rest of the series and bloody good fun". BookReporter's claimed, Hurwitz is "incapable of writing badly", praising the characters and plot. Publishers Weekly noted that Hellbent includes some genre clichés but concluded that the novel should please fans.

In a review for the audiobook, Booklist highlighted how narrator Brick "pulls listeners into the story and forces us to pay attention; like Hurwitz’s first-class writing, Brick’s narration offers no easy place at which to put the book aside. We’re stuck, riveted, until the final scenes."

Booklist included Hellbent on their list of the top ten crime novels of 2018.
