= Prodigal Son (Hurwitz novel) =

2021 novel by Gregg Hurwitz

- First edition
- Author: Gregg Hurwitz
- Language: English
- Series: Orphan X
- Release number: 6
- Genre: Thriller
- Publisher: Minotaur Books
- Publication date: January 26, 2021
- Publication place: United States
- Media type: Print (hardcover and paperback)
- Pages: 432
- ISBN: 978-1-250-25228-9
- OCLC: 1182019939
- Dewey Decimal: 813/.54
- LC Class: PS3558.U695 P76 2021
- Preceded by: Into the Fire
- Followed by: Dark Horse

Prodigal Son is a thriller novel written by American author Gregg Hurwitz. It was Hurwitz's sixth book in the Orphan X series, preceded by Into the Fire, and followed by Dark Horse.

In the novel, Evan Smoak leaves retirement to protect Andrew Duran at his mother's request. The book was released on January 26, 2021, by Minotaur Books.

== Plot ==
At twelve, Evan is the smallest resident at Pride House Group Home in East Baltimore. Charles Van Sciver says a stranger selects children for special instruction. Evan arranges a meeting, sabotages Van Sciver, and knocks down their visitor. A dark sedan flashes its headlights; Evan is selected, seeing Andre at a window.

Years afterward, Evan lives in Los Angeles. Jack Johns took him from Pride House and trained him as Orphan X, an assassin for a covert state program. Evan left and became the Nowhere Man. After a presidential pardon, he agrees to retire, though neighbor Mia Hall and her son Peter occupy his thoughts. A caller from Argentina claims to be his mother; Evan suspects a trap.

Andrew Duran works at a vehicle impound facility and faces separation from daughter Sofia. Federal marshal impersonators pay him to report when Jake Hargreave, a former military drone pilot, arrives for his vehicle. An unseen device cuts Hargreave's neck. Duran traps it inside his kiosk.

Evan travels to Buenos Aires, meets Veronica LeGrande, his mother, and agrees to protect Duran. A Hellfire missile from a Predator drone destroys Duran's home, but Evan survives beneath fiberglass insulation in a dumpster. He recognizes Duran as Andre, his former Pride House companion.

Evan recruits Joey Gutierrez, a sixteen-year-old hacker and Orphan trainee. Joey identifies killers Declan and Queenie Gentner, hired by someone called the doctor. Declan killed Hargreave with a miniature drone. Evan and Andre recover a dragonfly-shaped drone bearing Mimeticom's insignia. Evan kills six contractors.

Evan and Joey visit Rafael Gomez, Hargreave's former drone operator. Rafael says Mimeticom, founded by Dr. Brendan Molleken, built autonomous drones with ethical adaptors. One killed a technician during testing. Hargreave planned to expose the program, so Molleken arranged his death. Declan and Queenie kill Rafael.

Joey accesses Creech North's databases and finds an execution order against Andre, set to activate when a drone swarm launches. Veronica admits Andre is Evan's brother. Andre was conceived through her assault; Evan was born from a brief relationship afterward. Veronica gave Evan up.

Evan reconciles with Andre. Queenie attacks them at an Alcoholics Anonymous meeting, but Evan kills her. He raids Creech North with Joey and Candy McClure. Evan erases Andre's execution order and turns a drone against Molleken. Candy destroys the swarm with an electromagnetic pulse device. Evan kills Declan.

Veronica, dying from cirrhosis, names Evan's father as rodeo cowboy Jacob Baridon. On Christmas Eve, Evan reunites Andre with Sofia and accepts Mia's dinner invitation. He resumes helping callers and demands that the president end Mimeticom's contract.

The four damaged drones escape testing, retrieve Evan's facial data, and locate his penthouse. A dragonfly drone hovers outside, followed by three others. They breach his windows, destroying the penthouse. Evan steps onto the balcony railing.

== Reception ==
Prodigal Son received positive reviews from critics, with praise for its fast pacing, relentless action, character development, and exploration of family relationships. Publishers Weekly described the novel as "engrossing", highlighting its brisk pacing, continuous action, and Evan Smoak's emotional growth.

Book Marks recorded five reviews, comprising two rave, two positive, and one mixed or negative assessment, reflecting a generally favorable critical response. David Pitt of Booklist praised Hurwitz's writing and the novel's energetic storytelling, while Elizabeth Masterson of Library Journal commended its action, suspense, and examination of family.

Kirkus Reviews offered a more critical assessment, describing the novel as "Exhilarating pabulum for action fans" and criticizing its reliance on familiar action-thriller conventions.
