= Orphan X =

2016 novel by Gregg Hurwitz

- Author: Gregg Hurwitz
- Language: English
- Series: Orphan X
- Release number: 1
- Genre: Thriller
- Publisher: Minotaur Books
- Publication date: January 19, 2016
- Publication place: United States
- Media type: Print (hardcover and paperback)
- Pages: 368
- ISBN: 978-1-250-06784-5
- OCLC: 925426527
- Dewey Decimal: 813/.54
- LC Class: PS3558.U695 O77 2016
- Followed by: The Nowhere Man

Orphan X is a thriller novel written by Gregg Hurwitz. It was Hurwitz's first book in the Orphan X series, and was followed by The Nowhere Man. For a time, the film rights belonged to Warner Bros.

In the novel, Evan Smoak, a former government assassin, operates as the Nowhere Man to help those in need. The book was released on January 19, 2016, by Minotaur Books.

== Plot ==
Twelve-year-old Evan rides handcuffed in a sedan with Jack Johns, a recruiter who selected him near the Pride House Group Home in East Baltimore. Bruised and frightened, Evan hears Jack promise never to lie. Evan follows him, accepting suffering for a new life.

Years afterward, Evan Smoak lives in Castle Heights, a Los Angeles tower. A covert program once trained him as an assassin. Now the Nowhere Man, he aids desperate people under the Commandments. He watches district attorney Mia Hall and her son Peter. Morena Aguilar asks Evan for help: LAPD Detective Bill Chambers has abused young women and targeted her eleven-year-old sister, Carmen. Evan verifies her account and kills Chambers. He refuses payment, asks Morena to pass his number to another person in need, and pays the sisters' overdue rent.

Katrin White claims gamblers have kidnapped her father, Sam, over a $2.1 million debt. At a Chinatown restaurant, Evan spots a sniper, pulls Katrin away, kills another attacker, and escapes with her. Her abductors are Danny Slatcher, Orphan Zero, and Candy McClure, Orphan V. Slatcher contacts Top Dog through wearable devices. A gunshot makes Evan assume Sam is dead. He vows to rescue Katrin, breaking his Fourth Commandment.

Evan recalls the Orphan Program, which trains abandoned children as assassins. Jack gave him the surname Smoak. Evan quit after a Yemen mission ended with an activist's death. Beneath the Jefferson Memorial, armed men attacked them. Evan killed them, but Jack was fatally wounded. Evan kept his bloodstained shirt.

Memo Vasquez says Morena sent him to Evan for help protecting his daughter. Evan had allowed one person to be sent to him and suspects a client is lying. He leaves Katrin at a safe house and travels to Las Vegas. Slatcher tracks the safe house with a transmitter; his associates seize Katrin while Evan meets Memo. At Calabasas, Slatcher admits Sam is alive and the gunshot was staged.

The two offenders once prosecuted by Mia break into her condominium; Evan stops them. He follows Katrin's GPS signal to Calabasas and frees her. Morena confirms Memo was her referral: Katrin is an impostor. She stabs Evan, admitting Slatcher coerced her. Wounded, Evan returns to Castle Heights, where Mia helps him recover.

Evan learns Katrin is Danika White, a gambler whose debts Slatcher's employer paid. He tracks Slatcher to Las Vegas and kills him. Evan contacts Top Dog and rescues Memo's daughter. Danika begs for protection, but Evan refuses, breaking his Tenth Commandment: Never let an innocent die. Charles Van Sciver shoots Danika and identifies himself as Top Dog, head of a rebuilt Orphan Program hunting former operatives. Charles says Jack invented an assignment to hide Evan. Evan detonates a charge in a camera; Charles's fate is unknown. Jack is later shown alive, coaching another boy.

== Reception ==
The Washington Post compared Orphan X to the beginning of a Bourne like book series, referring to it as a "smart, stylish, state-of-the-art thriller." Author Robert Crais stated that "a new thriller superstar is born" and novelist David Baldacci was quoted as saying "read this book...you will thank me." The Associated Press stated that Hurwitz "delivers a masterpiece of suspense and thrills...that invokes the best of “Batman,” ”The Bourne Identity” and “The Equalizer” films." Orphan X became an international bestseller, making lists such as the USA Today, The Boston Globe, New Zealand, and Australia.

== Film and television adaptation ==
Prior to the release of Orphan X, Warner Bros. purchased the film rights. 22nd & Green, the production company owned by Bradley Cooper and Todd Phillips was linked to the film. Hurwitz was also said to be the writer for the movie adaptation. Warner Bros. allowed the rights to expire in 2018.

Brad Weston’s Makeready has landed the rights to the Orphan X book series with plans to adapt the thrillers into a television series along with Justin Lin’s Perfect Storm Entertainment.
