= Out of the Dark (Hurwitz novel) =

2019 novel by Gregg Hurwitz

- First edition
- Author: Gregg Hurwitz
- Language: English
- Series: Orphan X
- Release number: 4
- Genre: Thriller
- Publisher: Minotaur Books
- Publication date: January 29, 2019
- Publication place: United States
- Media type: Print (hardcover and paperback)
- Pages: 388
- ISBN: 978-1-250-12042-7
- OCLC: 1084678826
- Dewey Decimal: 813/.54
- LC Class: PS3558.U695O98 2019
- Preceded by: Hellbent
- Followed by: Into the Fire

Out of the Dark is a thriller novel written by American author Gregg Hurwitz. It was Hurwitz's fourth book in the Orphan X series, preceded by Hellbent and followed by Into the Fire.

In the novel, Evan Smoak targets the president behind efforts to eliminate the Orphan Program. The book was released on January 29, 2019, by Minotaur Books.

== Plot ==
Evan Smoak, once known as Orphan X, escaped a Defense Department program that trained children to kill for their country. Now called the Nowhere Man, he answers encrypted calls from people with nowhere else to turn. President Jonathan Bennett, once its supervisor, ordered surviving recruits and instructors killed to conceal the program. After Jack Johns, Evan's mentor and father-like guide, is murdered, Evan vows to kill Bennett.

Evan travels to Washington, D.C., and studies White House security, where Bennett has Secret Service protection. Special Agent Naomi Templeton directs security and receives orders to stop him. Bennett arranges release of Judd Holt, the first recruit, known as Orphan A. Holt received instruction comparable to Evan's and is sent to kill him.

A call from Trevon Gaines interrupts Evan's plans. Trevon, a young man with autism, survived the murder of his family by criminals tied to narcotics smuggling. The killers spared him, assuming he could not understand their dealings, but his remarkable memory makes him a witness they fear. Trevon contacts the Nowhere Man for help. Evan agrees to protect him while continuing his campaign against Bennett.

The murders followed loss of a narcotics shipment. Russell Gadds and his associates blame Trevon for their losses and intend to kill him before he can speak. Evan tracks the gang and tries to move Trevon beyond its grasp. Joey, Evan's young computer expert, supplies records and technical help.

Candy McClure, formerly Orphan V, joins Evan. Despite old resentment and physical clashes, their shared childhood gives them reason to cooperate. Candy knows the program and its surviving recruits. Together, they plan a way past Bennett's security. Naomi questions whether her duty requires her to shield Bennett.

Evan's first assignment, carried out in 1997, holds a clue to Bennett's purge. His search takes him to a witness whose account clarifies why Bennett fears public knowledge of that operation. It concealed matters that could ruin Bennett's public standing and expose the program's true purpose. Evan weighs killing the president against exposing his crimes.

Holt closes in, bringing both former recruits face to face. Their encounters revive memories of childhood conditioning and loss. Holt regrets failing to save a woman in Chechnya. His resentment toward Evan is bound to that failure and Bennett's command.

Evan attacks Gadds's compound, defeats the gang, and keeps his promise to Trevon. At Evan's former home, Holt and Evan meet for a fight. Evan kills him. Trevon gets an opportunity to start over. Evan must live with the cost of his choices, while his bond with Mia remains unsettled. Bennett's fate and the program's hidden past remain tied to Evan's future as Nowhere Man.

== Reception ==
Out of the Dark received positive reviews from critics. Kirkus Reviews praised the clever plotting, near-constant action and Evan Smoak's moral character, recommending the novel to readers familiar with the series. Publishers Weekly awarded the book a starred review, describing it as a gritty thriller with fast-paced action and commending Hurwitz's writing. Library Journal also awarded a starred review, highlighting the novel's swift-paced plot, numerous twists and surprise ending.
