= Dark Horse (Hurwitz novel) =

2022 novel by Gregg Hurwitz

- First edition
- Author: Gregg Hurwitz
- Language: English
- Series: Orphan X
- Release number: 7
- Genre: Thriller
- Publisher: Minotaur Books
- Publication date: February 8, 2022
- Publication place: United States
- Media type: Print (hardcover and paperback)
- Pages: 432
- ISBN: 978-1-250-25230-2
- OCLC: 1298595042
- Dewey Decimal: 813/.54
- LC Class: PS3558.U695 D37 2022
- Preceded by: Prodigal Son
- Followed by: The Last Orphan

Dark Horse is a thriller novel written by American author Gregg Hurwitz. It was Hurwitz's seventh book in the Orphan X series, preceded by Prodigal Son, and followed by The Last Orphan.

In the novel, Evan Smoak must rescue a drug lord's kidnapped daughter from Mexican cartel. The book was released on February 8, 2022, by Minotaur Books.

== Plot ==
Evan Smoak, formerly Orphan X, has abandoned the assassination program that trained him and become the Nowhere Man, helping desperate callers. After an assault destroyed his headquarters, he restores his resources and stays close to Mia Hall.

Aragón Urrea, a wealthy South Texas drug kingpin, contacts Evan after his eighteen-year-old daughter, Anjelina, is abducted by La Familia León, a Mexican criminal group headed by El Moreno, known as Montesco. The kidnappers take her across the border to their guarded headquarters. Aragón offers payment, but Evan hesitates because his employer made his fortune through crime. Aragón says his wealth supports his community, employs residents, and protects local families.

Aragón assigns Kiki and Special Ed to assist Evan. A package containing an undercover operative's severed head confirms Anjelina's peril. Evan examines the group's drug network and finds evidence of Kontact, a synthetic substance devastating American communities.

Anjelina fell in love with Reymundo, Montesco's son, despite hostility between their families. Their union and her pregnancy place her between two criminal households. Reymundo struggles with his father's demands. Aragón's need to control his daughter has damaged their bond.

Evan enters Mexico and gains access to Montesco's estate by posing as a useful outsider. He witnesses prisoner abuse and drug operations. He meets Aurora, a captive, and Venustiano, a prisoner subjected to Montesco's cruelty. Evan tries to protect them without exposing his intentions before reaching Anjelina.

Reymundo faces pressure to accept his family's business, while Anjelina tries to preserve her independence. Evan realizes her rescue also means protecting Reymundo, whose devotion makes him a target of his father's hostility. When Montesco's men question Evan's loyalty, he prepares an escape route and tries to assist Aurora.

Evan confronts Darling Boy, one of Montesco's associates, inside an underground passage. He survives and frees Anjelina and Reymundo. Their escape brings an armed response. Evan destroys pursuing vehicles to gain time, but is shot and suffers a broken rib. He protects the couple, defeats Montesco, and reunites with Kiki and Special Ed.

They travel toward the American border. Anjelina is unsure about returning to her father and former community. Evan urges her to make her own decisions rather than accept expectations imposed upon her.

Back in California, Evan returns to his apartment injured. Joey remains upset over their disagreements, while Mia prepares for an operation. At the hospital, Peter, Wally, Janet, and Joey support Mia as she awaits surgery.

At the White House, President Victoria Donahue-Carr receives a report from Special Agent Naomi Templeton. A man associated with a cartel massacre has violated his pardon and disappeared. A biometric match places him near a hospital, prompting efforts to locate him. Identified only as X, he remains sought by authorities, leaving Evan's freedom and the Orphan Program's future unresolved.

== Reception ==
Dark Horse received a starred review from Publishers Weekly, which praised its relentless pacing, action, and emotional depth. The publication described the novel as an excellent seventh installment, noting that the series continued to improve with each successive book.

Kirkus Reviews also gave the novel a positive review, describing it as a "crackerjack thriller" that expands the Orphan X series. The review praised Hurwitz's writing, the supporting characters, and the action sequences, including the fight scenes, pursuits, and confrontations.
