= Castle Heights =

Neighborhood in Geneva, New York, US

Castle Heights Maxwell Highland
- Geneva neighborhood
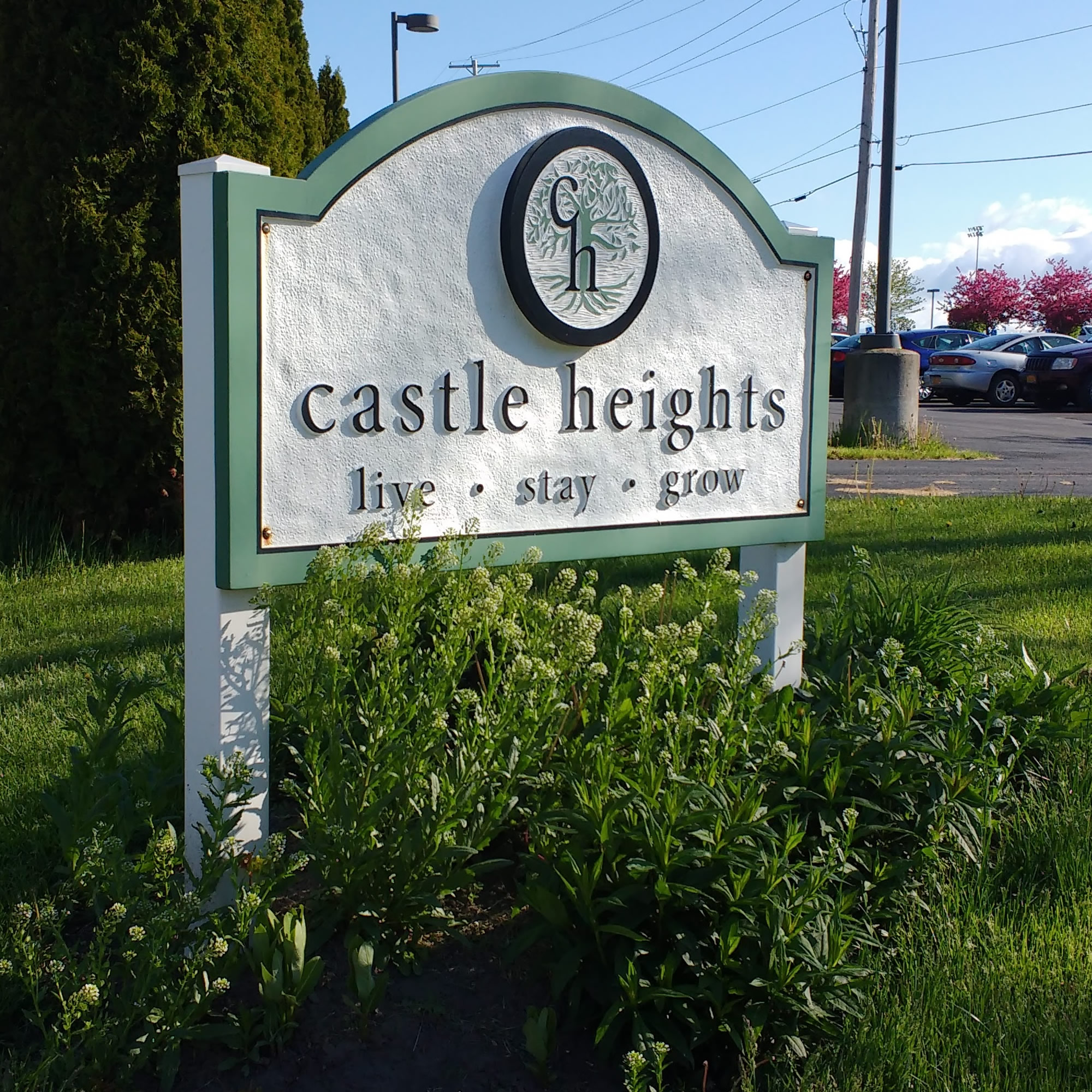
- Interactive map of Castle Heights
- Coordinates: 42°52′23″N 76°59′51″W
- Country: United States
- State: New York
- City: Geneva
- Time zone: EST

Castle Heights is a small residential neighborhood in northwest Geneva, New York. It is known for its architecturally diverse homes and plots of land larger than those in other neighborhoods in the city. Formerly referred to as "Maxwell Highland," Castle Heights displays characteristics of the outskirts of many other small American cities that prospered before and after World War II.

The neighborhood has tree-lined streets and wide sidewalks, and has been described by residents as a "walkable" part of town. The demographic of Castle Heights has historically been mostly professional and white-collar workers.

== Paper street ==
Edgewood Street, in the neighborhood of Castle Heights, is a "paper street": It exists on maps of the neighborhood, but is completely undeveloped. The lots of land on this street were divided in too-small parcels for a more recent rezoning by the legislature; this prevents them from being individually developed today.

== Neighborhood Association ==
Since the Geneva Neighborhood Resource Center's recent establishment of the name Castle Heights, an informal group of residents have gathered to form the Castle Heights Neighborhood Association. These residents meet semi-regularly to discuss important matters in the community, and to organize various neighborhood events.

== Annual picnic ==
Castle Heights has also in recent years begun a tradition of a yearly picnic at the beginning of summer.
