= The Program (novel) =

2004 novel by Gregg Hurwitz

- First edition cover
- Author: Gregg Hurwitz
- Language: English
- Series: Tim Rackley Novels
- Genre: Novel
- Publisher: William Morrow
- Publication date: August 31, 2004
- Publication place: USA
- Media type: Print (Hardback & Paperback) & AudioBook
- Pages: 368 pp
- ISBN: 0-06-053040-5
- Preceded by: The Kill Clause
- Followed by: Troubleshooter

The Program: A Novel is a novel by Gregg Hurwitz, first published in 2004. It has since been released as an Audio CD, an Audio Cassette, and was reprinted in paperback format, in 2005. The Program picks up where The Kill Clause left off, following a series of books by the author involving fictional Deputy U.S. Marshal, Tim Rackley.

== Plot ==
The work is part of a series following the character Tim Rackley, a member of the United States Marshals Service, and opens with a suicide in the La Brea Tar Pits. Rackley must rescue the daughter of a Hollywood producer from a dangerous mind control cult, by infiltrating the group. Charismatic leader TD Betters had created his own society based on self-help tenets, and Rackley must navigate through it without getting pulled in himself.

The novel describes a fictional large group awareness training called "The Program", and characters also use the term Large Group Awareness Training and "LGAT" to refer to the course. In the novel, the seminar leader had "married two cult models", which one of the protagonists describes as a blend of the "psychotherapeutic cult", and the "self-improvement cult". The character then tells his friend that "The Program", is similar to a combination of the Sullivanians and Lifespring. Werner Erhard is quoted, prior to the opening of the prologue.

== Reception ==
Back cover, The Program, 2004 ed.

Publishers Weekly characterized the work as engaging, and grounded in character and detail. Lukowsky of Booklist described the work as a "gripping read." The Oakland Press described the work as a thriller and a good character study. Oakland Press writer Mark Terry went on to state that the author had done his homework researching for the book, and that it was a fascinating and disturbing look at cults. The Chicago Sun-Times also gave a favorable review, noting that this was the author's fifth work at the age of 31. The book also received favorable reviews in The Capital Times, Cleveland Plain Dealer, and the San Jose Mercury News.

In the Audio version, AudioFile cited narrator Dylan Baker's "strong performance", stating that he differentiated between the multitude of characters in the book well, making them easy to distinguish. AudioFile went on to state that Baker's narration helped the listener comprehend how cults could manipulate those ignorant of their tactics.

== Adaptations ==
On October 12, 2003, film producer Lorenzo di Bonaventura was set to develop a feature film franchise based on Hurwitz’ Tim Rackley series at Paramount Pictures with Hurwitz writing the screenplay. On March 12, 2012, TNT was set to develop a television series adaptation of Hurwitz’ Tim Rackley series with Hurwitz set to executive produce with Shawn Ryan executive producing and showrunning the series adaptation through Sony Pictures Television.

== See also ==
- Cults and new religious movements in literature and popular culture
- est and The Forum in popular culture
- Large Group Awareness Training
- Lifespring
